= December 15 =

December 15 this year in various calendars
- Tuesday, 15 December 2026
Other calendars
Akan	Nkyibene
Armenian	28 Kʿaloch 1476
Aztec	Tozoztontli 14, 2 Mazātl
Babylonian	5 Kislimu, 2337 SE
Balinese pawukon	Menga, Kajeng, Sri, Umanis, Urukung, Anggara of Wariga, Ludra, Erangan, Dewa
Bengali	30 Ogrohayon, BS 1433
Chinese	Yin Water Pig・Tail Mansion; 7 Shíyīyuè, Bǐngwǔnián (Daxue, 7 days until Dongzhi)
Common Era	15 December 2026 CE
Coptic	6 Koiak, AM 1743
Egyptian	3 Pachon, 2775 NE
Ethiopian	6 Tākḫśāś, 2019 Amätä Məhrät
French Republican	Décade III, Quartidi de Frimaire de l'Année 235 de la République
Gregorian	15 December, AD 2026
Hebrew	5 Tevet, AM 5787
Hindu	Dhaniṣṭhā・Harṣaṇa; Solar: 29 Mārgaśīrṣa, 1948 SE; Lunisolar: Ṣaṣṭhī, Śukla pakṣa of Mārgaśīrṣa, 2083 VE; Rāudra・5127 KY・1,872,924
Icelandic	Þriðjudagur, 23 Ýlir 2026
Islamic	5 Rajab, AH 1448 (using tabular method)
ISO week date	2026-W51-2
Japanese	7 Shimotsuki, Reiwa 8 (Taisetsu, 7 days until Tōji)
Julian	2 December, AD 2026 (AM 7535)
Julian day	2461390
Maya	13.0.14.3.7; 0 Kankin, 2 Manik
Roman	ante diem IV Nonas Decembres, MMDCCLXXIX AUC
Solar Hijri	24 Azar, SH 1405
Tibetan	6 mgo, me pho rta 2153 or 1772 or 1000

<<	December					>>
Su	Mo	Tu	We	Th	Fr	Sa
		1	2	3	4	5
6	7	8	9	10	11	12
13	14	15	16	17	18	19
20	21	22	23	24	25	26
27	28	29	30	31
2026

December 15 in recent years
2025 (Monday)
2024 (Sunday)
2023 (Friday)
2022 (Thursday)
2021 (Wednesday)
2020 (Tuesday)
2019 (Sunday)
2018 (Saturday)
2017 (Friday)
2016 (Thursday)

December 15 is the 349th day of the year (350th in leap years) in the Gregorian calendar; 16 days remain until the end of the year.

== Events ==
=== Pre-1600 ===
- 533 – Vandalic War: Byzantine general Belisarius defeats the Vandals, commanded by King Gelimer, at the Battle of Tricamarum.
- 687 – Pope Sergius I is elected as a compromise between antipopes Paschal and Theodore.
- 1025 – Constantine VIII becomes sole emperor of the Byzantine Empire, 63 years after being crowned co-emperor.
- 1161 – Jin–Song wars: Military officers conspire against the emperor Wanyan Liang of the Jin dynasty after a military defeat at the Battle of Caishi, and assassinate the emperor at his camp.
- 1167 – Sicilian Chancellor Stephen du Perche moves the royal court to Messina to prevent a rebellion.
- 1256 – Mongol forces under Hulagu enter and dismantle the Nizari Ismaili (Assassin) stronghold at Alamut Castle (in present-day Iran) as part of their offensive on Islamic southwest Asia.
- 1270 – The Nizari Ismaili garrison of Gerdkuh, Persia surrender after 17 years to the Mongols.
- 1467 – Stephen III of Moldavia defeats Matthias Corvinus of Hungary, with the latter being injured thrice, at the Battle of Baia.
- 1546 – The town of Ekenäs (Finnish: Tammisaari) is founded by King Gustav Vasa of Sweden.

=== 1601–1900 ===
- 1651 – Castle Cornet in Guernsey, the last stronghold which had supported the King in the Third English Civil War, surrenders.
- 1778 – American Revolutionary War: British and French fleets clash in the Battle of St. Lucia.
- 1791 – The United States Bill of Rights becomes law when ratified by the Virginia General Assembly.
- 1836 – The U.S. Patent Office building in Washington, D.C., nearly burns to the ground, destroying all 9,957 patents issued by the federal government to that date, as well as 7,000 related patent models.
- 1862 – American Civil War: The Battle of Fredericksburg ends in a Union defeat as General Ambrose Burnside withdraws the Army of the Potomac across the Rappahannock River.
- 1864 – American Civil War: The Battle of Nashville begins at Nashville, Tennessee, and ends the following day with the destruction of the Confederate Army of Tennessee under General John Bell Hood as a fighting force by the Union Army of the Cumberland under General George H. Thomas.
- 1869 – The short-lived Republic of Ezo is proclaimed in the Ezo area of Japan. It is the first attempt to establish a democracy in Japan.
- 1871 – Sixteen-year-old telegraphist Ella Stewart keys and sends the first telegraphed message from Arizona Territory at the Deseret Telegraph Company office in Pipe Spring.
- 1890 – Hunkpapa Lakota leader Sitting Bull is killed on Standing Rock Indian Reservation, leading to the Wounded Knee Massacre.
- 1893 – Symphony No. 9 ("From the New World" a.k.a. the "New World Symphony") by Antonín Dvořák premieres in a public afternoon rehearsal at Carnegie Hall in New York City, followed by a concert premiere on the evening of December 16.
- 1899 – British Army forces are defeated at the Battle of Colenso in Natal, South Africa, the third and final battle fought during the Black Week of the Second Boer War.

=== 1901–present ===
- 1903 – Italian American food cart vendor Italo Marchiony receives a U.S. patent for inventing a machine that makes ice cream cones.
- 1905 – The Pushkin House is established in Saint Petersburg, Russia, to preserve the cultural heritage of Alexander Pushkin.
- 1906 – The London Underground's Great Northern, Piccadilly and Brompton Railway opens.
- 1914 – World War I: The Serbian Army recaptures Belgrade from the invading Austro-Hungarian Army.
- 1914 – A gas explosion at Mitsubishi Hōjō coal mine, in Kyushu, Japan, kills 687.
- 1917 – World War I: An armistice between Russia and the Central Powers is signed.
- 1933 – Anarchist insurrection suppressed in Zaragoza, Spain.
- 1939 – Gone with the Wind (highest inflation adjusted grossing film) receives its premiere at Loew's Grand Theatre in Atlanta, Georgia, United States.
- 1941 – The Holocaust in Ukraine: German troops murder over 15,000 Jews at Drobytsky Yar, a ravine southeast of the city of Kharkiv.
- 1942 – World War II: The Battle of Mount Austen, the Galloping Horse, and the Sea Horse begins during the Guadalcanal campaign.
- 1943 – World War II: The Battle of Arawe begins during the New Britain campaign.
- 1944 – World War II: a single-engine UC-64A Norseman aeroplane carrying United States Army Air Forces Major Glenn Miller is lost in a flight over the English Channel.
- 1945 – Occupation of Japan/Shinto Directive: General Douglas MacArthur orders that Shinto be abolished as the state religion of Japan.
- 1960 – Richard Pavlick is arrested for plotting to assassinate U.S. President-Elect John F. Kennedy.
- 1960 – King Mahendra of Nepal suspends the country's constitution, dissolves parliament, dismisses the cabinet, and imposes direct rule.
- 1961 – Eichmann trial: Adolf Eichmann is sentenced to death after being found guilty by an Israeli court of 15 criminal charges, including charges of crimes against humanity, crimes against the Jewish people, and membership of an outlawed organization.
- 1965 – Project Gemini: Gemini 6A, crewed by Wally Schirra and Thomas Stafford, is launched from Cape Kennedy, Florida. Four orbits later, it achieves the first space rendezvous, with Gemini 7.
- 1967 – The Silver Bridge collapses, killing 46 people.
- 1970 – Soviet spacecraft Venera 7 successfully lands on Venus. It is the first successful soft landing on another planet.
- 1973 – John Paul Getty III, grandson of American billionaire J. Paul Getty, is found alive near Naples, Italy, after being kidnapped by an Italian gang on July 10.
- 1973 – The American Psychiatric Association votes 13–0 to remove homosexuality from its official list of psychiatric disorders, the Diagnostic and Statistical Manual of Mental Disorders.
- 1978 – U.S. President Jimmy Carter announces that the United States will recognize the People's Republic of China and sever diplomatic relations with the Republic of China (Taiwan).
- 1981 – A suicide car bombing targeting the Iraqi embassy in Beirut, Lebanon, levels the embassy and kills 61 people, including Iraq's ambassador to Lebanon. The attack is considered the first modern suicide bombing.
- 1989 – Second Optional Protocol to the International Covenant on Civil and Political Rights relating the abolition of capital punishment is adopted.
- 1993 – The Troubles: The Downing Street Declaration is issued by British Prime Minister John Major and Irish Taoiseach Albert Reynolds.
- 1997 – Tajikistan Airlines Flight 3183 crashes in the desert near Sharjah, United Arab Emirates, killing 85.
- 2000 – The third reactor at the Chernobyl Nuclear Power Plant is shut down.
- 2001 – The Leaning Tower of Pisa reopens after 11 years and $27,000,000 spent to stabilize it, without fixing its famous lean.
- 2005 – Introduction of the Lockheed Martin F-22 Raptor into USAF active service.
- 2010 – A boat carrying 90 asylum seekers crashes into rocks off the coast of Christmas Island, Australia, killing 48 people.
- 2013 – The South Sudanese Civil War begins when opposition leaders Dr. Riek Machar, Pagan Amum and Rebecca Nyandeng vote to boycott the meeting of the National Liberation Council at Nyakuron.
- 2014 – Gunman Man Haron Monis takes 18 hostages inside a café in Martin Place for 16 hours in Sydney. Monis and two hostages are killed when police raid the café the following morning.
- 2017 – A 6.5M_{w}earthquake strikes the Indonesian island of Java in the city of Tasikmalaya, resulting in four deaths.

== Births ==
=== Pre-1600 ===
- AD 37 – Nero, Roman emperor (died 68)
- 130 – Lucius Verus, Roman emperor (died 169)
- 1242 – Prince Munetaka, Japanese shōgun (died 1274)
- 1447 – Albert IV, Duke of Bavaria (died 1508)
- 1567 – Christoph Demantius, German composer, poet, and theorist (died 1643)

=== 1601–1900 ===
- 1610 – David Teniers the Younger, Flemish painter (died 1690)
- 1657 – Michel Richard Delalande, French organist and composer (died 1726)
- 1686 – Jean-Joseph Fiocco, Flemish violinist and composer (died 1746)
- 1710 – Francesco Zahra, Maltese painter (died 1773)
- 1789 – Carlos Soublette, Venezuelan general and politician, 11th President of Venezuela (died 1870)
- 1832 – Gustave Eiffel, French architect and engineer, co-designed the Eiffel Tower (died 1923)
- 1846 – Amunda Kolderup, Norwegian opera singer (died 1882)
- 1852 – Henri Becquerel, French physicist and chemist, Nobel Prize laureate (died 1908)
- 1859 – L. L. Zamenhof, Polish linguist and ophthalmologist, created Esperanto (died 1917)
- 1860 – Niels Ryberg Finsen, Faroese-Danish physician and educator, Nobel Prize laureate (died 1904)
- 1861 – Charles Duryea, American engineer and businessman, co-founded the Duryea Motor Wagon Company (died 1938)
- 1861 – Pehr Evind Svinhufvud, Finnish lawyer, judge, and politician, 3rd President of Finland (died 1944)
- 1863 – Arthur Dehon Little, American chemist and engineer (died 1935)
- 1869 – Leon Marchlewski, Polish chemist and academic (died 1946)
- 1875 – Emilio Jacinto, Filipino journalist and activist (died 1899)
- 1878 – Hans Carossa, German author and poet (died 1956)
- 1885 – Leonid Pitamic, Slovenian lawyer, philosopher, and academic (died 1971)
- 1886 – Wanda Krahelska-Filipowicz, Polish politician and resistance fighter (died 1968)
- 1886 – Florence Jepperson Madsen, American contralto singer and professor of music (died 1977)
- 1888 – Maxwell Anderson, American journalist and playwright (died 1959)
- 1890 – Harry Babcock, American pole vaulter (died 1965)
- 1891 – A.P. Carter, American country singer-songwriter and musician (died 1960)
- 1892 – J. Paul Getty, American-English businessman and art collector, founded Getty Oil (died 1976)
- 1894 – Vibert Douglas, Canadian astrophysicist and astronomer (died 1988)
- 1894 – Josef Imbach, Swiss sprinter (died 1964)
- 1896 – Betty Smith, American author and playwright (died 1972)
- 1899 – Harold Abrahams, English sprinter, lawyer, and journalist (died 1978)

=== 1901–present ===
- 1902 – Robert F. Bradford, American lawyer and politician, 57th Governor of Massachusetts (died 1983)
- 1903 – Tamanishiki San'emon, Japanese sumo wrestler, the 32nd Yokozuna (died 1938)
- 1907 – Gordon Douglas, American actor, director, and screenwriter (died 1993)
- 1907 – Oscar Niemeyer, Brazilian architect, designed the United Nations Headquarters and the Cathedral of Brasília (died 2012)
- 1908 – Swami Ranganathananda, Indian monk, scholar, and author (died 2005)
- 1909 – Sattar Bahlulzade, Azerbaijani-Russian painter (died 1974)
- 1909 – Eliza Atkins Gleason, American librarian (died 2009)
- 1910 – John Hammond, American record producer and critic (died 1987)
- 1911 – Nicholas P. Dallis, American psychiatrist and illustrator (died 1991)
- 1911 – Stan Kenton, American pianist and composer (died 1979)
- 1913 – Roger Gaudry, Canadian chemist and businessman (died 2001)
- 1913 – Muriel Rukeyser, American poet, academic, and activist (died 1980)
- 1915 – Eila Campbell, English geographer and cartographer (died 1994)
- 1916 – Miguel Arraes, Brazilian lawyer and politician, Governor of Pernambuco (died 2005)
- 1916 – Buddy Cole, American pianist and conductor (died 1964)
- 1916 – Maurice Wilkins, New Zealand-English physicist and biologist, Nobel Prize laureate (died 2004)
- 1917 – Shan-ul-Haq Haqqee, Indian-Pakistani linguist and lexicographer (died 2005)
- 1918 – Jeff Chandler, American actor (died 1961)
- 1918 – Chihiro Iwasaki, Japanese painter and illustrator (died 1974)
- 1919 – Max Yasgur, American dairy farmer and host of the Woodstock Music & Art Fair (died 1973)
- 1920 – Gamal al-Banna, Egyptian author and scholar (died 2013)
- 1920 – Kurt Schaffenberger, German-American sergeant and illustrator (died 2002)
- 1921 – Alan Freed, American radio host (died 1965)
- 1923 – Pierre Cossette, American producer and manager (died 2009)
- 1923 – Freeman Dyson, English-American physicist and mathematician (died 2020)
- 1923 – Uziel Gal, German-Israeli engineer, designed the Uzi gun (died 2002)
- 1923 – Valentin Varennikov, Russian general and politician (died 2009)
- 1924 – Frank W. J. Olver, English-American mathematician and academic (died 2013)
- 1924 – Ruhi Sarıalp, Turkish triple jumper and educator (died 2001)
- 1925 – Kasey Rogers, American actress and author (died 2006)
- 1926 – Bill Pitt, Australian race car driver (died 2017)
- 1928 – Ida Haendel, Polish-English violinist and educator (died 2020)
- 1928 – Friedensreich Hundertwasser, Austrian-New Zealand painter and architect (died 2000)
- 1930 – Edna O'Brien, Irish novelist, playwright, poet and short story writer (died 2024)
- 1931 – Klaus Rifbjerg, Danish author and poet (died 2015)
- 1932 – Jesse Belvin, American singer-songwriter and pianist (died 1960)
- 1932 – John Meurig Thomas, Welsh chemist and academic (died 2020)
- 1933 – Bapu, Indian director and screenwriter (died 2014)
- 1933 – Tim Conway, American comedian, actor, producer, and screenwriter (died 2019)
- 1933 – Donald Woods, South African journalist and activist (died 2001)
- 1936 – Joe D'Amato, Italian director and producer (died 1999)
- 1938 – Michael Bogdanov, Welsh director and screenwriter (died 2017)
- 1938 – Billy Shaw, American football player (died 2024)
- 1939 – Cindy Birdsong, American singer-songwriter
- 1939 – Dave Clark, English musician and songwriter
- 1942 – Kathleen Blanco, American educator and politician, 54th Governor of Louisiana (died 2019)
- 1943 – Lucien den Arend, Dutch sculptor
- 1944 – Chico Mendes, Brazilian trade union leader and activist (died 1988)
- 1945 – Heather Booth, American civil rights activist, feminist, and political strategist
- 1946 – Carmine Appice, American drummer and songwriter
- 1946 – Genny Lim, American writer
- 1946 – Comunardo Niccolai, Italian footballer (Torres, Cagliari, national team) (died 2024)
- 1948 – Cassandra Harris, Australian actress (died 1991)
- 1948 – Charlie Scott, American basketball player
- 1949 – Don Johnson, American actor
- 1949 – Brian Roper, English economist and academic
- 1950 – Melanie Chartoff, American actress and comedian
- 1950 – Sylvester James Gates, American theoretical physicist and professor
- 1951 – Joe Jordan, Scottish footballer and manager
- 1952 – Rudi Protrudi, American singer-songwriter and producer
- 1952 – Allan Simonsen, Danish footballer and manager
- 1952 – Julie Taymor, American director, producer, and screenwriter
- 1953 – John R. Allen, American general and diplomat
- 1953 – Robert Charles Wilson, American-Canadian author
- 1954 – Alex Cox, English film director, screenwriter, actor, non-fiction author and broadcaster
- 1954 – Oliver Heald, English lawyer and politician, Solicitor General for England and Wales
- 1954 – Mark Warner, American businessman and politician, 69th Governor of Virginia
- 1955 – Paul Simonon, English singer-songwriter and bass player
- 1956 – John Lee Hancock, American screenwriter, film director, and producer
- 1956 – Tony Leon, South African lawyer and politician
- 1957 – Mario Marois, Canadian ice hockey player and sportscaster
- 1959 – Greg Matthews, Australian cricketer
- 1959 – Alan Whetton, New Zealand rugby player
- 1959 – Gary Whetton, New Zealand rugby player
- 1960 – Walter Werzowa, Austrian composer and producer
- 1961 – Karin Resetarits, Austrian journalist and politician
- 1962 – Tim Gaines, American bass player
- 1963 – Ellie Cornell, American actress and producer
- 1963 – Norman J. Grossfeld, American screenwriter and producer
- 1963 – Helen Slater, American actress
- 1964 – Paul Kaye, English actor
- 1966 – Carl Hooper, Guyanese cricketer and coach
- 1966 – Molly Price, American actress
- 1968 – Garrett Wang, American actor
- 1969 – Ralph Ineson, English actor
- 1969 – Chantal Petitclerc, Canadian wheelchair racer and senator
- 1969 – Adam Setliff, American discus thrower and lawyer
- 1970 – Frankie Dettori, Italian jockey
- 1970 – Michael Shanks, Canadian actor, screenwriter and director
- 1971 – Clint Lowery, American singer-songwriter, guitarist, and producer
- 1972 – Lee Jung-jae, South Korean actor
- 1972 – Stuart Townsend, Irish actor
- 1973 – Surya Bonaly, French figure skater
- 1973 – Ryoo Seung-wan, South Korean actor, director, and screenwriter
- 1974 – Garath Archer, English rugby player
- 1974 – P. J. Byrne, American actor
- 1975 – Samira Saraya, Palestinian actor, filmmaker, poet and rapper
- 1976 – Baichung Bhutia, Indian footballer and manager
- 1976 – Kim Eagles, Canadian sport shooter
- 1977 – Mehmet Aurélio, Brazilian-Turkish footballer and manager
- 1977 – Geoff Stults, American actor and producer
- 1978 – Mark Jansen, Dutch guitarist and songwriter
- 1979 – Adam Brody, American actor
- 1979 – Eric Young, Canadian-American wrestler
- 1980 – Élodie Gossuin, French beauty pageant titleholder and model
- 1980 – Sergio Pizzorno, English singer-songwriter and guitarist
- 1981 – Michelle Dockery, English actress
- 1981 – Brendan Fletcher, Canadian actor and screenwriter
- 1981 – Roman Pavlyuchenko, Russian footballer
- 1982 – Charlie Cox, English actor
- 1982 – Borja García, Spanish racing driver
- 1982 – George O. Gore II, American actor and comedian
- 1982 – Tatiana Perebiynis, Ukrainian tennis player
- 1983 – Delon Armitage, Trinidadian-English rugby player
- 1983 – René Duprée, Canadian professional wrestler
- 1983 – Camilla Luddington, English actress
- 1983 – Ronnie Radke, American singer-songwriter, guitarist, and producer
- 1983 – Sophia Young, Vincentian-American basketball player
- 1984 – Martin Škrtel, Slovak footballer
- 1985 – Diogo Fernandes, Brazilian footballer
- 1986 – Kim Junsu, South Korean singer-songwriter and dancer
- 1986 – Keylor Navas, Costa Rican footballer
- 1986 – Snejana Onopka, Ukrainian model
- 1988 – Erik Gustafsson, Swedish ice hockey player
- 1988 – Steven Nzonzi, French footballer
- 1991 – Conor Daly, American race car driver
- 1991 – Yanni Gourde, Canadian ice hockey player
- 1991 – Alana Haim, American musician and actress
- 1992 – Jesse Lingard, English footballer
- 1992 – Maximiliano Meza, Argentine footballer
- 1992 – Alex Telles, Brazilian footballer
- 1993 – Daniel Ochefu, American basketball player
- 1995 – Jahlil Okafor, American basketball player
- 1996 – Jenifer Brening, German singer
- 1996 – Oleksandr Zinchenko, Ukrainian footballer
- 1997 – Maude Apatow, American actress
- 1997 – Magdalena Fręch, Polish tennis player
- 1997 – Stefania LaVie Owen, New Zealand-American actress
- 2000 – Kayvon Thibodeaux, American football player

== Deaths ==
=== Pre-1600 ===
- 933 – Li Siyuan, Chinese emperor (born 867)
- 1025 – Basil II, Byzantine emperor (born 958)
- 1072 – Alp Arslan, Turkish sultan (born 1029)
- 1161 – Wanyan Liang, Chinese emperor (born 1122)
- 1230 – Ottokar I, duke of Bohemia (born 1155)
- 1283 – Philip I, Latin emperor (born 1243)
- 1343 – Hasan Kucek, Chopanid prince (born c. 1319)
- 1467 – Jöns Bengtsson Oxenstierna, archbishop and regent of Sweden (born 1417)
- 1574 – Selim II, Ottoman sultan (born 1524)
- 1598 – Philips of Marnix, Lord of Saint-Aldegonde, Dutch nobleman (born 1540)

=== 1601–1900 ===
- 1621 – Charles d'Albert, duc de Luynes, French courtier, Constable of France (born 1578)
- 1673 – Margaret Cavendish, Duchess of Newcastle-upon-Tyne, English noblewoman (born 1623)
- 1675 – Johannes Vermeer, Dutch painter and educator (born 1632)
- 1683 – Izaak Walton, English author (born 1593)
- 1688 – Gaspar Fagel, Dutch lawyer and politician (born 1634)
- 1698 – Louis Victor de Rochechouart de Mortemart, French nobleman (born 1636)
- 1715 – George Hickes, English minister and scholar (born 1642)
- 1753 – Richard Boyle, 3rd Earl of Burlington, English architect and politician, designed Chiswick House (born 1694)
- 1792 – Joseph Martin Kraus, Swedish pianist, violinist, and composer (born 1756)
- 1812 – Shneur Zalman, Russian rabbi, author and founder of Chabad (born 1745)
- 1817 – Federigo Zuccari, astronomer, director of the Astronomical Observatory of Naples (born 1783)
- 1819 – Daniel Rutherford, Scottish chemist and physician (born 1749)
- 1855 – Jacques Charles François Sturm, French mathematician and academic (born 1803)
- 1878 – Alfred Bird, English chemist and businessman, invented baking powder (born 1811)
- 1890 – Sitting Bull, Hunkpapa Lakota tribal chief (born 1831)

=== 1901–present ===
- 1943 – Fats Waller, American singer-songwriter and pianist (born 1904)
- 1944 – Glenn Miller, American bandleader and composer (born 1904)
- 1947 – Arthur Machen, Welsh journalist and author (born 1863)
- 1947 – Crawford Vaughan, Australian politician, 27th Premier of South Australia (born 1874)
- 1950 – Vallabhbhai Patel, Indian lawyer and politician, 1st Deputy Prime Minister of India (born 1875)
- 1958 – Wolfgang Pauli, Austrian-Swiss physicist and academic, Nobel Prize laureate (born 1900)
- 1962 – Charles Laughton, English-American actor, director, and producer (born 1899)
- 1965 – M. Balasundaram, Sri Lankan journalist, lawyer, and politician (born 1903)
- 1966 – Keith Arbuthnott, 15th Viscount of Arbuthnott, Indian-Scottish general and politician, Lord Lieutenant of Kincardineshire (born 1897)
- 1966 – Walt Disney, American animator, director, producer, and screenwriter, co-founded The Walt Disney Company (born 1901)
- 1968 – Antonio Barrette, Canadian politician, 18th Premier of Quebec (born 1899)
- 1968 – Jess Willard, American boxer and actor (born 1881)
- 1969 – Karl Theodor Bleek, German lawyer and politician, 12th Mayor of Marburg (born 1898)
- 1971 – Paul Lévy, French mathematician and theorist (born 1886)
- 1974 – Anatole Litvak, Russian-American director, producer, and screenwriter (born 1902)
- 1977 – Wilfred Kitching, English 7th General of The Salvation Army (born 1893)
- 1978 – Chill Wills, American actor (born 1903)
- 1980 – Peter Gregg, American race car driver (born 1940)
- 1982 – Máire Comerford, Irish Republican (born 1893)
- 1984 – Jan Peerce, American tenor and actor (born 1904)
- 1985 – Seewoosagur Ramgoolam, Mauritian physician and politician, 1st Prime Minister of Mauritius (born 1900)
- 1986 – Serge Lifar, Russian-French ballet dancer and choreographer (born 1905)
- 1991 – Vasily Zaytsev, Russian captain (born 1915)
- 1993 – William Dale Phillips, American chemist and engineer (born 1925)
- 2000 – Haris Brkić, Bosnian-Serbian basketball player (born 1974)
- 2003 – Vincent Apap, Maltese sculptor (born 1909)
- 2003 – George Fisher, American cartoonist (born 1923)
- 2003 – Keith Magnuson, Canadian ice hockey player and coach (born 1947)
- 2004 – Vassal Gadoengin, Nauruan educator and politician, Speaker of the Nauru Parliament (born 1943)
- 2005 – Heinrich Gross, Austrian physician and psychiatrist (born 1914)
- 2005 – Stan Leonard, Canadian golfer (born 1915)
- 2005 – William Proxmire, American soldier, journalist, and politician (born 1915)
- 2006 – Clay Regazzoni, Swiss racing driver (born 1939)
- 2006 – Mary Stolz, American journalist and author (born 1920)
- 2007 – Julia Carson, American lawyer and politician (born 1938)
- 2008 – León Febres Cordero, Ecuadorian engineer and politician, 46th President of Ecuador (born 1931)
- 2009 – Eliza Atkins Gleason, American librarian (born 1909)
- 2009 – Oral Roberts, American evangelist, founded the Oral Roberts Evangelistic Association (born 1918)
- 2010 – Blake Edwards, American director, producer, and screenwriter (born 1922)
- 2010 – Bob Feller, American baseball player and sportscaster (born 1918)
- 2010 – Eugene Victor Wolfenstein, American psychoanalyst and theorist (born 1940)
- 2011 – Bob Brookmeyer, American trombone player and composer (born 1929)
- 2011 – Christopher Hitchens, English-American essayist, literary critic, and journalist (born 1949)
- 2012 – Owoye Andrew Azazi, Nigerian general (born 1952)
- 2012 – Patrick Ibrahim Yakowa, Nigerian politician, 18th Governor of Kaduna State (born 1948)
- 2012 – Olga Zubarry, Argentinian actress (born 1929)
- 2013 – Harold Camping, American evangelist, author, radio host (born 1921)
- 2013 – Joan Fontaine, British-American actress (born 1917)
- 2013 – Dyron Nix, American basketball player (born 1967)
- 2014 – Donald Metcalf, Australian physiologist and immunologist (born 1929)
- 2014 – Fausto Zapata, Mexican journalist, lawyer, and politician, Governor of San Luis Potosí (born 1940)
- 2015 – Harry Zvi Tabor, English-Israeli physicist and engineer (born 1917)
- 2016 – Craig Sager, American sports journalist (born 1951)
- 2017 – Heinz Wolff, scientist and TV presenter (born 1928)
- 2017 – Calestous Juma, academic (born 1953)
- 2018 – Eryue He, Chinese historical fiction writer (born 1945)
- 2018 – Girma Wolde-Giorgis, President of Ethiopia (born 1924)
- 2020 – Saufatu Sopoanga, Tuvaluan politician, 8th Prime Minister of Tuvalu (born 1952)
- 2024 – Zakir Hussain, Indian tabla player, musical producer, film actor and composer (born 1951)
- 2025 – William J. Bauer, senior United States circuit judge of the United States Court of Appeals for the Seventh Circuit in Chicago and previously a United States district judge of the United States District Court for the Northern District of Illinois, (born 1926)

== Holidays and observances ==
- Bill of Rights Day (United States)
  - 2nd Amendment Day (South Carolina)
- Christian feast day:
  - Drina Martyrs
  - Drostan (Aberdeen Breviary)
  - John Horden and Robert McDonald (Episcopal Church (USA))
  - Maria Crocifissa di Rosa
  - Mesmin
  - Valerian of Abbenza
  - Virginia Centurione Bracelli
  - December 15 (Eastern Orthodox liturgics)
- Homecoming Day (Alderney)
- Kingdom Day (Netherlands), moves to December 16 if the 15th is on a Sunday
- Zamenhof Day (International Esperanto Community)
- World Turkic Language Family Day (UNESCO)
