= Ida Hunt Udall =

American Latter-day Saint diarist (1858–1915)

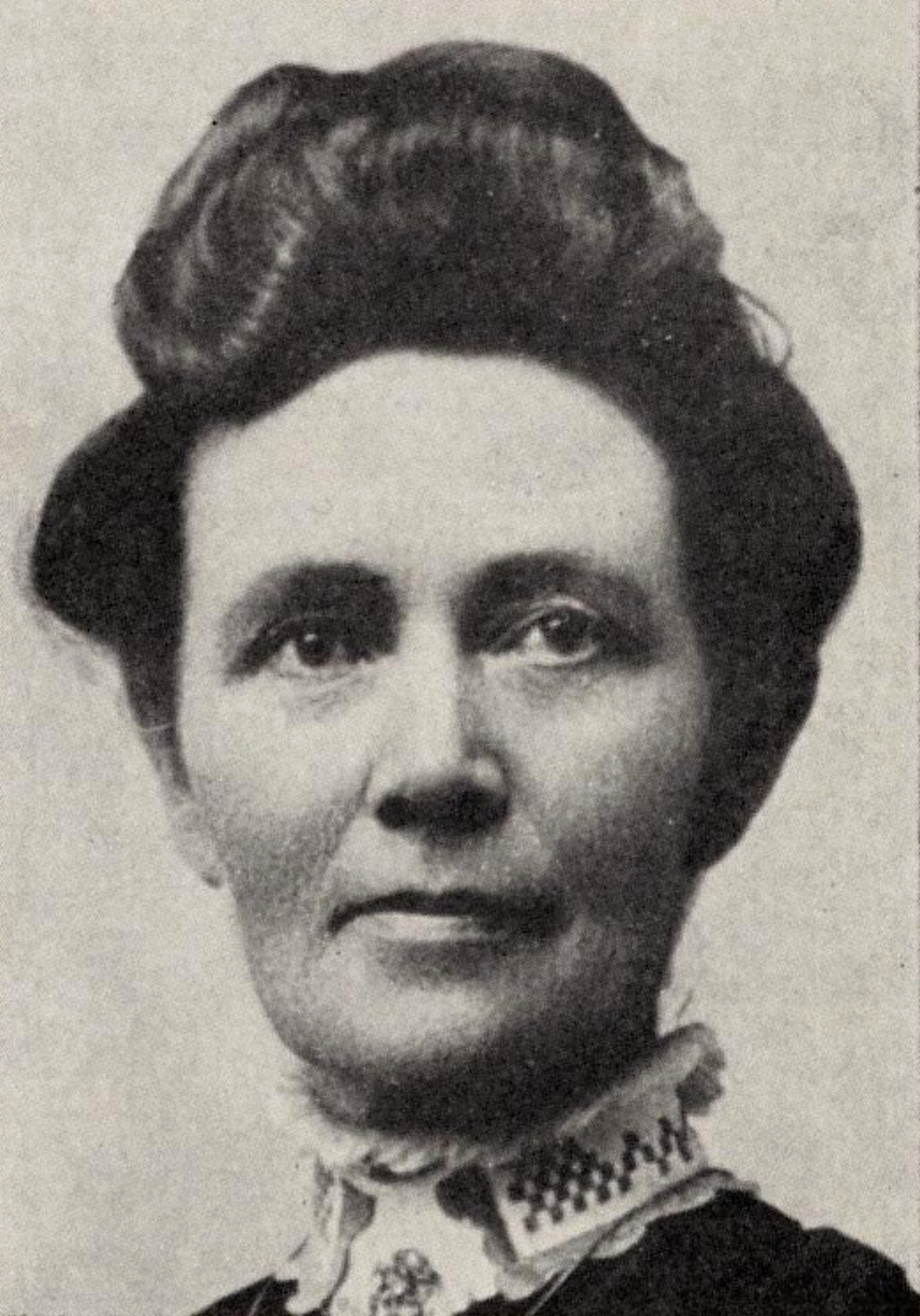
- Udall in 1905
- Born: Ida Frances Hunt; March 8, 1858; Hamilton Fort, Utah, U. S.
- Died: April 26, 1915 (aged 57); Hunt, Arizona, U. S.
- Burial place: Saint Johns Cemetery, St. Johns, Arizona
- Known for: Diary literature; homesteading; Latter-day Saint polygamy
- Notable work: Personal diary (compiled in Mormon Odyssey: The Story of Ida Hunt Udall, Plural Wife)
- Spouses: David King Udall (became husband & wife 1882); Eliza Luella Stewart (became co-wives 1882); Mary Ann Linton (became co-wives 1903)

Ida Frances Hunt Udall (March 8, 1858 – April 26, 1915) was an American diarist, homesteader, and teacher in territorial Utah and Arizona. A lifelong member of the Church of Jesus Christ of Latter-day Saints (LDS Church), Udall participated in the church's historical practice of plural marriage as the second wife of Latter-day Saint bishop David King Udall and co-wife of former telegraphist Ella Stewart Udall and of Mary Ann Linton Morgan Udall, a widow of John Hamilton Morgan.

During the height of the United States' prosecutorial campaign against polygamy in the 1880s, Udall went into hiding as a fugitive on the "Mormon Underground", or the practice of Latter-day Saints (Mormons) going into hiding to evade arrest or subpoena for antipolygamy prosecution. From 1882 to 1886, she authored a diary of her life in plural marriage and then on the Underground. This diary, considered a "major contribution to Mormon pioneer literature" by biographer Maria Ellsworth, later became the core of a posthumous biography that won the Mormon History Association's Best Biography Award.

Called a "serene intellectual" by historian Leonard J. Arrington, Udall spent much of her adulthood homesteading in eastern Arizona while she raised six children, several of whom went on to have influential political careers.

== Early life ==
=== Childhood ===
Ida Frances Hunt was born at Hamilton Fort, Utah, on March 8, 1858. She was the oldest child of John Hunt and Lois B. Pratt Hunt, who were both Mormons, or members of the Church of Jesus Christ of Latter-day Saints (LDS Church), and raised Ida Hunt in their faith. John and Lois Hunt raised Ida in Iron County, Utah, until she was approximately a year old, at which time they moved to San Bernardino, California, where two of her sisters were born. In 1863, Hunt's parents moved the family to Beaver, Utah, where Hunt's maternal grandmother Louisa Barnes Pratt lived, and the Hunts arrived there in May. In November 1869, when she was eleven years old, Hunt was baptized into the LDS Church by immersion in the Beaver River. (Note: Baptism is an initiation ritual practiced in many forms of Christianity. Latter-day Saints baptize by immersion, meaning by immersing the participant's whole body in water.)

Excerpt from Ida Hunt's memoir

"No girl has a happier childhood to look back upon, than I. Possessed of a father whose highest aim was to rear his children respectably educate and bring them up in the fear of the Lord. A mother who always welcomed us home from school, with the same cheerful smile, and made things so comfortable & pleasant for us, and a dear kind Grandma to whom we could always run".

— Compiled in Mormon Odyssey, 6 (Note: This brief memoir, different from her diary, was not finished or formally published before its inclusion in Mormon Odyssey.)

=== Adolescence ===
Hunt received her education while growing up in Beaver, and she formed friendships that endured throughout her life. When Hunt was thirteen, her father paid for her and her sisters to attend a local school, and Hunt attended until she was sixteen.

Sometime between 1872 and 1873, Hunt began working as a bookkeeper for a local wool mill. In 1875, Hunt joined the newly formed Beaver Literary Association, and in April of that year she started her own school for children. Seventeen years old, she taught classes and independently managed the school's finances. In November 1875, John Hunt moved the family from Beaver to Sevier County, Utah, and Hunt continued her teaching career there. She taught for at least a term at a log-cabin school in Joseph City, Utah, and for another term in Monroe, Utah. (Note: Ellsworth reports that Ida Hunt taught "one or two terms of school" at Joseph, leaving the exact number ambiguous.)

== Young adulthood ==
=== New Mexico ===
In February 1877, John Hunt moved the family again, this time to New Mexico. On the way, the Hunt family passed through the Utah cities of Washington and St. George. While in St. George in late-February, Ida Hunt and her sister May received their endowments in the St. George Temple. (Note: The Latter-day Saint endowment is a ceremony performed by and for adult church members in temples, places of worship distinct from chapels used for Sunday meetings. Its purpose is akin to a coming-of-age ritual and Christian confirmation.)

The family traveled for approximately three months. Hunt and May together drove one of the teams of animals throughout the trip. The Hunts arrived in San Lorenzo, Valencia County, New Mexico, on May 10, 1877, and they stopped there for three weeks before pressing on to the Savoia Valley, an interethnic community where Euro-American Latter-day Saints, Mexicans, Navajo, and Zuni lived in proximity to each other. While living in Savoia, Hunt studied Spanish, taught her younger siblings in an ad hoc school, and made money as a seamstress.

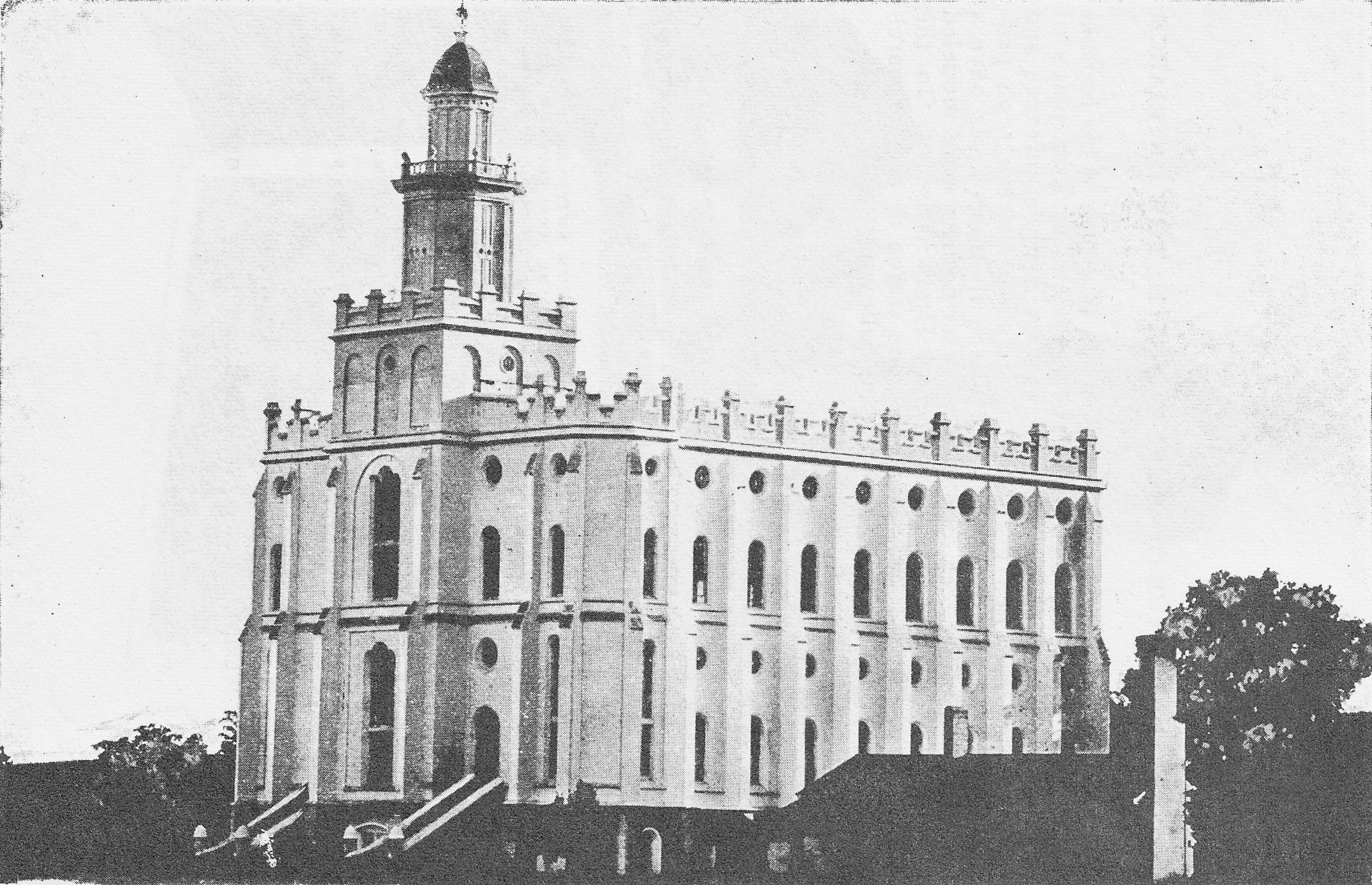
The St. George Temple, where Ida Hunt received the Latter-day Saint endowment

=== Utah ===
In late 1878, the LDS Church asked John Hunt to serve as a bishop for the church in Snowflake, Arizona, and he moved the family once again. This time, Ida Hunt did not accompany the rest of her family; she instead moved back to Beaver, Utah, arriving there in November 1878, to live with her grandmother Louisa Barnes Pratt. At this time, the Beaver Stake (Note: In the LDS Church, a stake is a regional unit of ecclesiastical organization which oversees several local units, or congregations (known as wards).) of the LDS Church appointed Ida Hunt to serve in its Young Ladies Mutual Improvement Association (YLMIA (Note: The YLMIA was a female-run Mormon organization which focused on self-improvement and spiritual development for young Latter-day Saint women.)) as a counselor, or advisor, to the president. Hunt supported herself by earning money sewing and transcribing court records, and she participated in a vibrant social life with concerts, parties, and social gatherings. Hunt also reconnected with Johnny Murdock, a son of Beaver Stake president John R. Murdock, and Johnny Murdock became what literary scholar Genevieve Long calls a "serious suitor" to her.

=== Arizona ===
In April 1880, at her immediate family's urging, Hunt left Beaver to move to Snowflake, Arizona, to rejoin them. John R. Murdock arranged for Hunt to make the trip with Jesse N. Smith, Eastern Arizona Stake president, and his wives Emma and Augusta. During this time, Latter-day Saints married polygamously as a religious practice, though the federal Morrill Anti-Bigamy Act had criminalized polygamy in American territories since 1862. The proportion of Latter-day Saint families participating in polygamy during the time of its official practice ranged between approximately 20% and 64%, depending on the congregation. In Arizona, that proportion may have been even greater, and local ecclesiastical leaders were often polygamists. As Hunt traveled with the Smiths, she perceived something distinctly spiritual in their relationship which much impressed her. In the words of historian Jan Shipps, Hunt was "converted to plural marriage".

Hunt reunited with her family in Snowflake. Shortly after their arrival, Smith called Hunt to serve as YLMIA president for the Eastern Arizona Stake; she simultaneously served as secretary of the stake-level Relief Society. In her professional life, Hunt returned to teaching, and she taught at log schools in Snowflake and Taylor, Arizona.

In 1881, Johnny Murdock proposed marriage to Hunt, but she broke off their relationship. Hunt wanted a polygamous marriage involving other wives, and Murdock was a monogamist who did not support polygamy.

Excerpt from Ida Hunt's letter to Ella Udall

"I cannot allow another day to pass by without writing you to ascertain if possible your true feelings upon… the possibility or probability of my becoming at some future day a member of your family… I cannot allow the matter to go farther, without first having received some assurance of your willingness to such a step being taken, at least that you have no more serious objections to me than you would to any other under like circumstances.

"During my stay at St. Johns I learned to love you like a sister, and the very thought that I may have been the cause of bringing unhappiness to you has troubled me day and night."

— Dated January 29, 1882, quoted in Mormon Odyssey, 44

=== Plural courtship and engagement ===
While Hunt was in Snowflake, she met David King Udall, a Latter-day Saint who at the time was bishop in St. Johns, Arizona, and superintendent of a church-endorsed co-op store. In need of a clerk for the Co-op, Udall wanted to hire someone who spoke Spanish, and he found Hunt an agreeable candidate. Udall hired Hunt in the autumn of 1881, and she moved to St. Johns to work for the Co-op, boarding with Udall, his wife Ella Stewart Udall (a former telegraphist), and their baby daughter Pearl (a year old at the time). Hunt and David had a mutual attraction. That winter, with Ella's consent, David asked Hunt about the possibility of her marrying him as a plural wife.

Sensitive to the feelings of Ella, whom she deeply respected, Hunt moved back to Snowflake and returned to teaching at a school in Taylor. From there, Hunt asked Ella Udall by a January 1882 letter for permission to plurally marry her husband. Replying by mail in March, Ella Udall, albeit somewhat reluctantly, consented to Hunt marrying David Udall. David, Ella, and Pearl Udall met up with Hunt in Snowflake, and on May 6, 1882, the four of them departed together, heading for St. George, Utah, to marry in the temple there.

== Early marriage ==
Hunt began keeping a diary the day she and the Udalls departed for their wedding. The diary was simultaneously a personal journal and a conscious contribution to recording the history of the Latter-day Saints. Long states that in her writing, Hunt made "artful use of language and plot" and drew upon tropes from contemporary sentimental novels—such as, according to Long, portraying David Udall as a "strong male hero" or her life as "the heroine's quest for a happy marriage and family"—to articulate the narrative of her experiences.

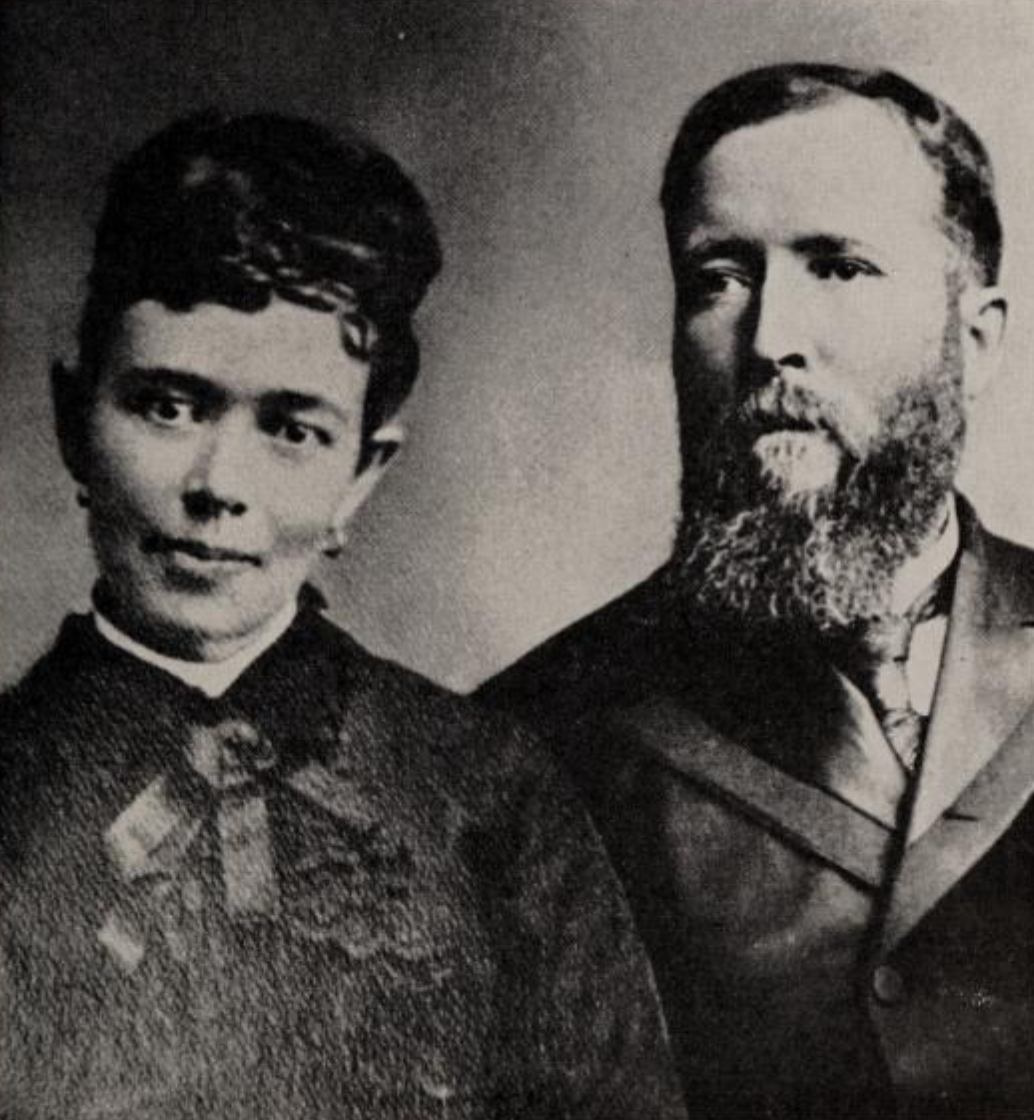
Ida Udall (left); David Udall (right)

Hunt and the Udalls journeyed by way of the "Honeymoon Trail" leading from Snowflake to St. George. On the way, Hunt conducted herself cautiously, hoping to avoid offending Ella Udall who remained ambivalent about the plural marriage. To portray this in her diary, Hunt used romantic tropes that dramatized the difficult emotions she felt around David and Ella. After a three-week trip, they arrived in St. George, and Ida Hunt married David Udall with Ella present in the St. George Temple on May 25, 1882. (Note: Latter-day Saint plural marriage ceremonies involved the first wife's participation along with the husband and co-wife. Historian Laurel Thatcher Ulrich writes, "A later account of the ceremony used in performing plural marriages says that the first wife placed the hand of the intended wife in the hand of her husband and then linked hands with him and remained standing while the marriage was performed.")

Following the marriage, Ida Udall and Ella Udall made some rapprochement. They spent the wedding night together in conversation, and on the way back to St. Johns they continued having private conversations with each other. The Udall family also made a two-week stop to visit with Ella's relatives, and Ida Udall became part of the family and its network of plural wives, achieving some measure of reconciliation between herself and Ella Udall.

Udall stayed with her father over the summer. On August 25, 1882, she moved back to St. Johns and began living in the same house as David, Ella, and Pearl. While living together, Ida Udall and Ella collaborated on community projects, such as a local May Day celebration in 1884.

Community life in St. Johns was uneasy. The Latter-day Saints were relative newcomers to the town, and more established residents resented the Mormons' presence out of religious opposition as well as economic and political rivalry. In 1884, the local Apache Chief newspaper publicly proposed that the community lynch John Hunt, Udall's father, and her husband David. Ida Udall felt uncomfortable surrounded by this animosity. Worsening matters, in an attitude common among white Mormons at the time, she held racist views against the Mexican community living in St. Johns, whom she did not consider worthy neighbors.

== Mormon Underground ==
In mid-1884, David Udall was indicted on a charge of polygamy. Federal law had criminalized polygamy in U. S. territories since the 1862 Morrill Anti-Bigamy Act, and the 1882 Edmunds Act additionally outlawed "unlawful cohabitation", or the cohabitation of a man with multiple women without marriage proven. To avoid being subpoenaed and forced to testify against him, as questioning plural wives in court was a well-known strategy of anti-polygamy prosecution, Ida Udall went into hiding for over two years in a practice known as the "Mormon Underground". By "Mormon Underground", Latter-day Saints referred to a variety of strategies for evading arrests or subpoenas, including frequently moving, living in hiding, keeping marriages and pregnancies secret, and living under pseudonyms. Historian Charles Peterson writes that Udall did so to "remove the physical evidence that would indict" David: herself. Accompanied by three other plural wives, Udall vacated St. Johns and went to Snowflake.

In August, federal marshals inquired after Ida Udall at the Udall home in St. Johns where they questioned four-year-old Pearl, who denied any knowledge of Ida Udall's whereabouts. On September 28, Udall fled town, and she eventually went to live with David Udall's parents in Nephi, Utah. When prosecutors brought polygamy charges against David Udall, they were unable to summon Ida Udall to testify against him and failed to secure a conviction.

Udall remained on the Underground for over two years and gave birth to her first child with David, named Pauline, while in hiding. During this time, Udall stayed with David's parents sporadically, and she depended heavily on support from a network of friends and other Latter-day Saint women who assisted her materially and emotionally by helping her secure employment, childcare, social connections, and emotional stability. To support herself, Udall often turned to sewing and bookkeeping, and she briefly held a job transcribing county records. In order to obfuscate their relationship and her location, Udall communicated with David through her co-wife Ella. Even in this correspondence, David wrote as if he and Ida were siblings in order to maintain plausible deniability about their relationship, though not being acknowledged as a wife frustrated Udall, who felt lonely in her isolation from the family.

Although prosecutors did not successfully bring polygamy charges against David Udall, in 1885 he was convicted and imprisoned on a trumped-up perjury charge that was attributed to anti-polygamy lobbying in St. Johns. However, St. Johns County officials signed a letter to Grover Cleveland, the President of the United States, asking him to pardon David, and Cleveland pardoned David for the perjury in 1885. The polygamy charge was dropped in 1886, and Ida Udall eventually returned to eastern Arizona from Utah. That same year, in November, she stopped keeping a diary.

Udall and her daughter did not immediately return to St. Johns; they stayed with two of her sisters in Snowflake until March 1888, when she moved to a farm in Round Valley, Arizona, that David and his brother had purchased. Ella Udall and her children visited that summer; it was the first time Ida Udall and Ella Udall had seen each other in four years.

Ella's ambivalence about plural marriage persisted, however. When David had financial difficulty in caring for the whole family, he temporarily had Ida move back in with her parents in Snowflake, for fear of "offend[ing] Ella", and Udall's place in the household remained inconstant thereafter. For two years, Udall and her children moved back and forth between Snowflake and Round Valley, and Ella and her children moved back and forth between Round Valley and St. Johns. Anti-polygamy prosecution also continued to haunt Udall; in the summer of 1891, she and friend Mary Ann Linton Morgan cut short a stay in Round Valley and fled to Snowflake to hide from federal marshals.

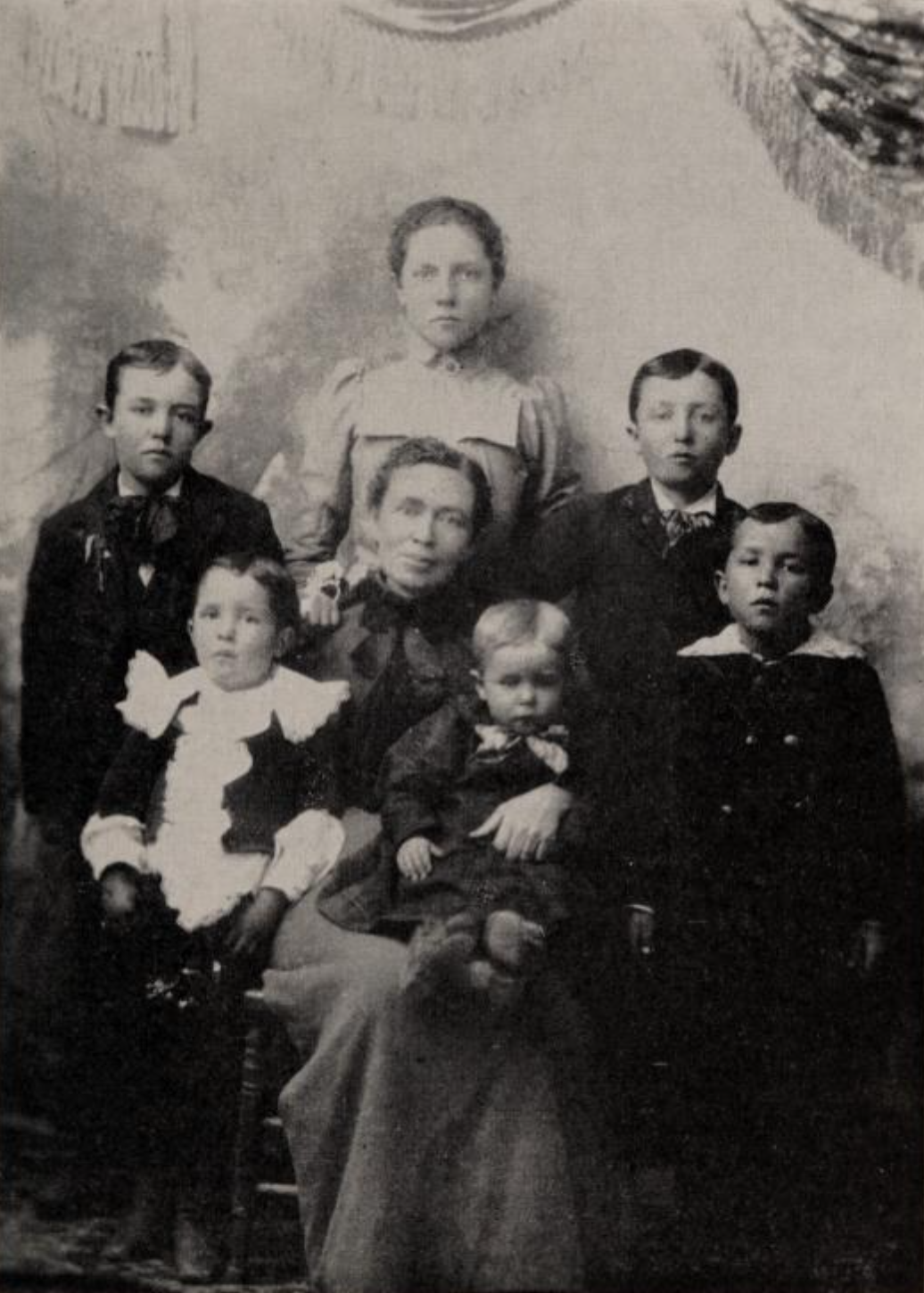
Standing: John Hunt Udall, Pauline Udall, Grover Cleveland Udall, Jesse Addison Udall. Seated: Gilbert Udall, Ida Hunt Udall, Don Taylor Udall.

== Homesteading and later life ==
In 1890, LDS Church president Wilford Woodruff issued a statement known as the 1890 Manifesto in which he publicly advised Latter-day Saints to obey federal laws outlawing polygamy, withdrawing the church's official sanction of the practice. (Note: In practice, however, some high-level church leaders, including apostles, secretly continued encouraging and enabling Latter-day Saints to practice polygamy. The institutional church gradually committed itself to monogamy—eventually excommunicating members who continued to enter or sanction new plural marriages—in the early twentieth century.) The Udalls lived as one family in a single household in the winter of 1891–1892, but in the spring David concluded that complying with the 1890 Manifesto required not cohabitating with plural wives, and he moved Ida Udall to a farm in Eagar, Arizona, where she ran a co-op store while he occasionally checked in. However, in July 1892, church leaders instructed him otherwise and to remain a family, and David restored contact with Ida Udall. Still, for most of the remainder of Ida Udall's life, David primarily cohabited with Ella, with Ida Udall managed the farm on her own.

At the turn of the century, Udall acquired a homestead in her own name in Greer Valley (later called Hunt Valley), Arizona, where she began living in the spring of 1902. The homestead was named Hunt. Udall and her sons worked the property, starting in a tent and eventually building a house. Over the years, she tended a garden, raised grain, kept pigs, cows, and chickens; made cheese, butter, and hay; and managed the property as a way station for mail carriers. Udall also continued using her business and bookkeeping skills. She handled finances for the Hunt ranch and wrote David's professional and ecclesiastical correspondence on his behalf. Throughout these conditions, Udall was a "serene intellectual", in the words of historian Leonard J. Arrington, who promoted culture and education as a teacher and musician.

Udall had six children with David, and for the most part she raised them on her own while David mostly lived with Ella. In May 1903, Latter-day Saint apostles Matthias F. Cowley and John W. Taylor encouraged David Udall to plurally marry Mary Ann Linton Morgan, a widow whose husband John Hamilton Morgan had died in 1894. Ida Udall was a close friend of Morgan's and encouraged the marriage. Ella did not share this interest. At Cowley and Taylor's behest, David married Morgan in 1903. Morgan and her three young sons began living with Ida Udall and her children at Hunt on December 23 that year. Having been friends for years, Udall and Morgan got along well as co-wives living together. Udall and Morgan lived together until 1906, when Mary purchased and moved into a house of her own.

Between 1906 and 1908, Udall suffered three strokes, the last of which paralyzed her on her left side. Pauline took responsibility for Udall's care, and Pearl, at the time a student at the Los Angeles College of Osteopathy, took a leave from her program in order to help. Thereafter, Udall and Pauline lived variously in Hunt Valley, St. Johns, and Snowflake; Ella Udall's sometimes fraught feelings toward her co-wife warmed, and her relationship with Ida Udall improved.

Seven years after her third stroke, Udall died in Hunt Valley on April 26, 1915, in the home and company of her daughter Pauline. She was buried in St. Johns.

== Legacy ==
=== Family ===
Many of Udall's children became prominent figures in Western community and politics. Three of her sons—John Hunt Udall, Jesse Addison Udall, and Don Taylor Udall—served in the Arizona state legislature. John Hunt Udall was a two-time gubernatorial nominee and later a mayor of Phoenix, Arizona. John's son, John Nicholas Udall, was later a mayor of Phoenix as well; he served several terms. Don Taylor and Jesse Addison were also superior court judges in Navajo County and Graham County, respectively. In 1960, Jesse acceded to the Arizona Supreme Court, and he served as a justice for eleven years. Pearl Udall moved to Salt Lake City, Utah, and opened a medical practice, which she successfully ran the rest of her life. Pauline remained in northeastern Arizona; she served for seventeen years as president of the LDS Church's Snowflake Stake Primary Association. Pauline's husband and Udall's son-in-law, Asahel Henry Smith, admired Udall and frequently retold stories from her life.

Udall was the grandmother of Maria S. Ellsworth, her biographer, a schoolteacher, and a book review author, whom Kim Engel-Pearson called a "specialist in Mormon History". Udall also was the great-grandmother of Milan Smith, a judge on the United States Court of Appeals for the Ninth Circuit. She was also the great-great-grandmother of novelist Brady Udall, author of The Lonely Polygamist.

=== Diary ===
The diary Udall kept during the first four years of her marriage is, according to biographer Ellsworth, a "major contribution to Mormon pioneer literature." In a historical and literary analysis, Genevieve Long concludes that Udall's journal is "an important account of polygamous life" and "may justly be called an autobiography, a carefully crafted, artful reconstruction of a life". Written with intertextuality with then-contemporary literature, according to Long, the diary demonstrates creativity and literary strategy, functioning as both a "personal resource" and "public record". As a historical document, Charles S. Peterson describes Udall's writing as being "outstanding among" Mormon women's diaries, "written with feeling and perception". Peggy Pascoe considers it "riveting reading". Publishers Weekly's review regretted that "Udall's complaints against her husband" in the diary "seem to be given short shrift due to her own self-abnegation". According to Engel-Pearson, Udall's accounts "wrote into being the pioneer women's experience" in Arizona.

Udall's diary is the core of a biography assembled by Ellsworth which the University of Illinois Press published in 1992. Titled Mormon Odyssey: The Story of Ida Hunt Udall, Plural Wife, the book contains full transcriptions of Udall's diary and unfinished memoir alongside biographical writing by Ellsworth. Reviewer Stephen Stein recommended the book to people interested in women's studies, religious history, and Mormon history, though according to him it "lacks a critical perspective, because of the documents contained in it". Historian Jan Shipps wrote of the "beauty and pathos of Ida Hunt's story" but believed that the book suffered from Ellsworth "fail[ing] to make a consistent effort to render [Mormonism] intelligible to a general audience". Pascoe considered "Ellsworth's editorial touch… deft and unobtrusive", stating that Ellsworth had "a fine eye for phrases outsiders will not understand, and she provides footnotes with all the necessary explanation". After its publication, Mormon Odyssey received the Mormon History Association's Best Biography Award.

== See also ==
- Mormon literature
- Northern Arizona
- The Church of Jesus Christ of Latter-day Saints in Arizona
- Udall family
