= Brady Udall =

American writer

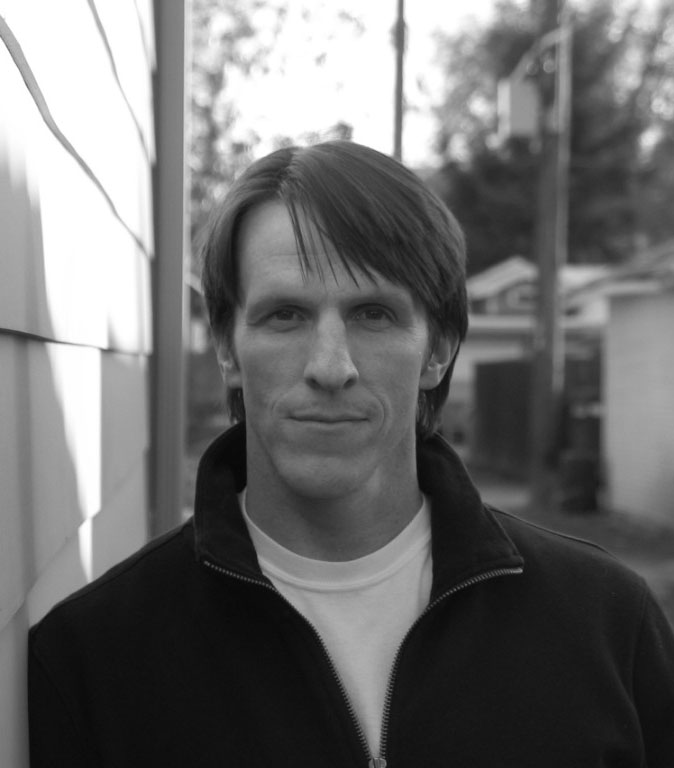
- Born: St. Johns, Arizona, U.S.
- Occupations: Writer, journalist
- Known for: novels: The Miracle Life of Edgar Mint; The Lonely Polygamist

Brady Udall is an American writer. In 2010, he was appointed Writer-in-Residence of Idaho, a position he held until 2013.

== Biography ==
Udall grew up in a large Mormon family in St. Johns, Arizona. He graduated from Brigham Young University and later attended the Iowa Writers' Workshop at the University of Iowa. He was formerly a faculty member of Franklin & Marshall College starting in 1998, then Southern Illinois University, and now teaches writing at Boise State University.

A collection of his short stories titled Letting Loose the Hounds was published in 1998, and his debut novel The Miracle Life of Edgar Mint was first published in 2001. The characterization and structure of the latter has been favorably compared to the work of John Irving. Thematically it has been compared to Charles Dickens. Michael Stipe has optioned a film adaptation of Miracle, with United Artists hiring Michael Cuesta to direct.

In July 2007, Udall appeared on an episode of This American Life.

Udall is the great-great-grandson of David King Udall and his plural wife Ida Hunt Udall. In an interview about his novel The Lonely Polygamist, he said this "strong family connection to polygamy" made it "only right" that he author a novel about a polygamist. Through this heritage, Udall is related to members of the Udall family, including former U.S. congressman and Interior Secretary Stewart Udall, and former congressman and presidential candidate Morris Udall.

== Bibliography ==
- Letting Loose the Hounds (stories) (1997)
- The Miracle Life of Edgar Mint (novel) (2001)
- The Lonely Polygamist (novel) (2010)
