= Pipe Spring National Monument =

National monument in Arizona, United States

- IUCN category III (natural monument or feature)
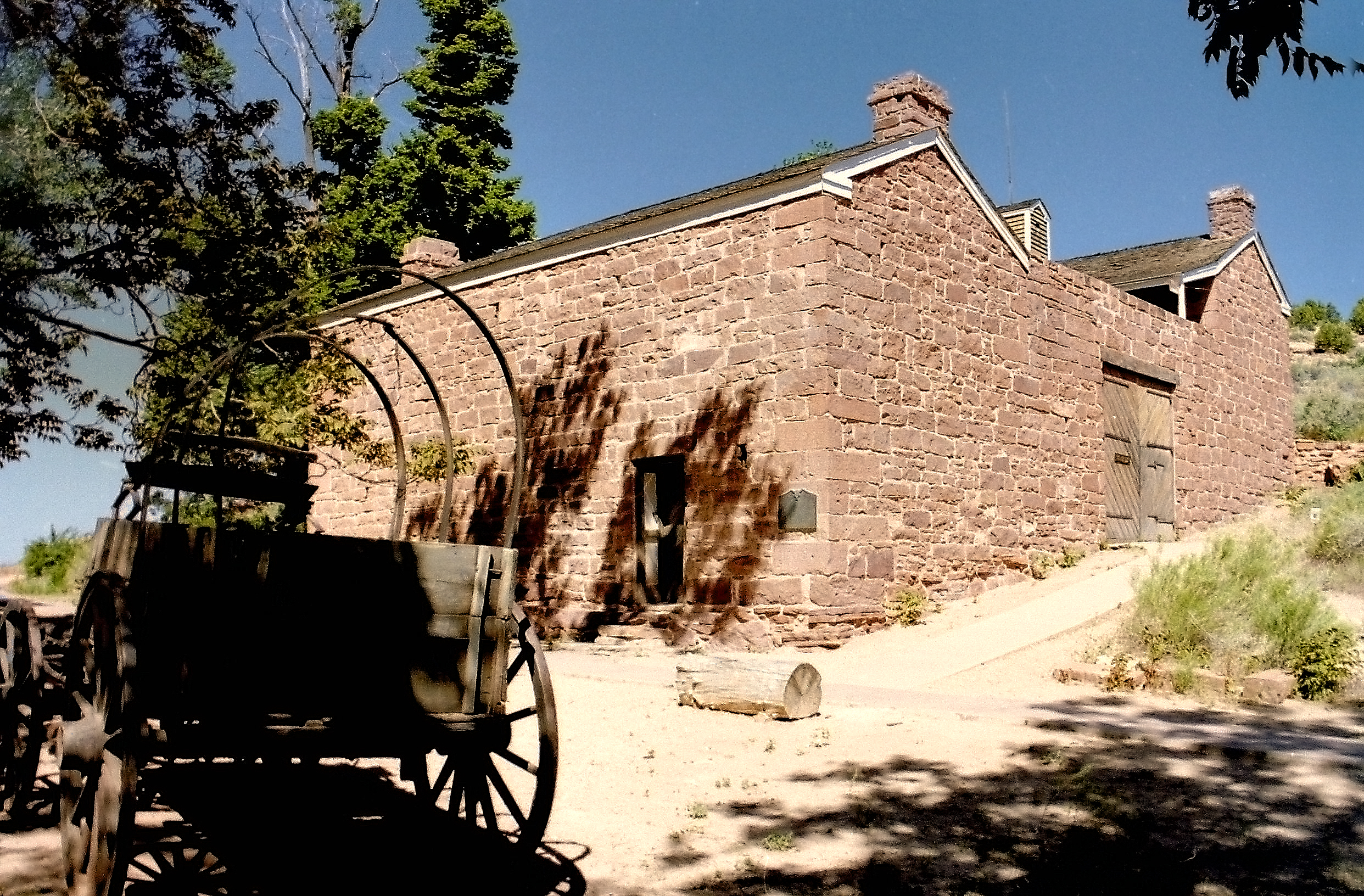
- Winsor Castle
- Location: Mohave County, Arizona, US
- Nearest city: Fredonia, Arizona
- Coordinates: 36°51′45″N 112°44′15″W
- Area: 40 acres (16 ha)
- Created: May 31, 1923
- Visitors: 18,967 (in 2025)
- Governing body: National Park Service
- Website: Pipe Spring National Monument

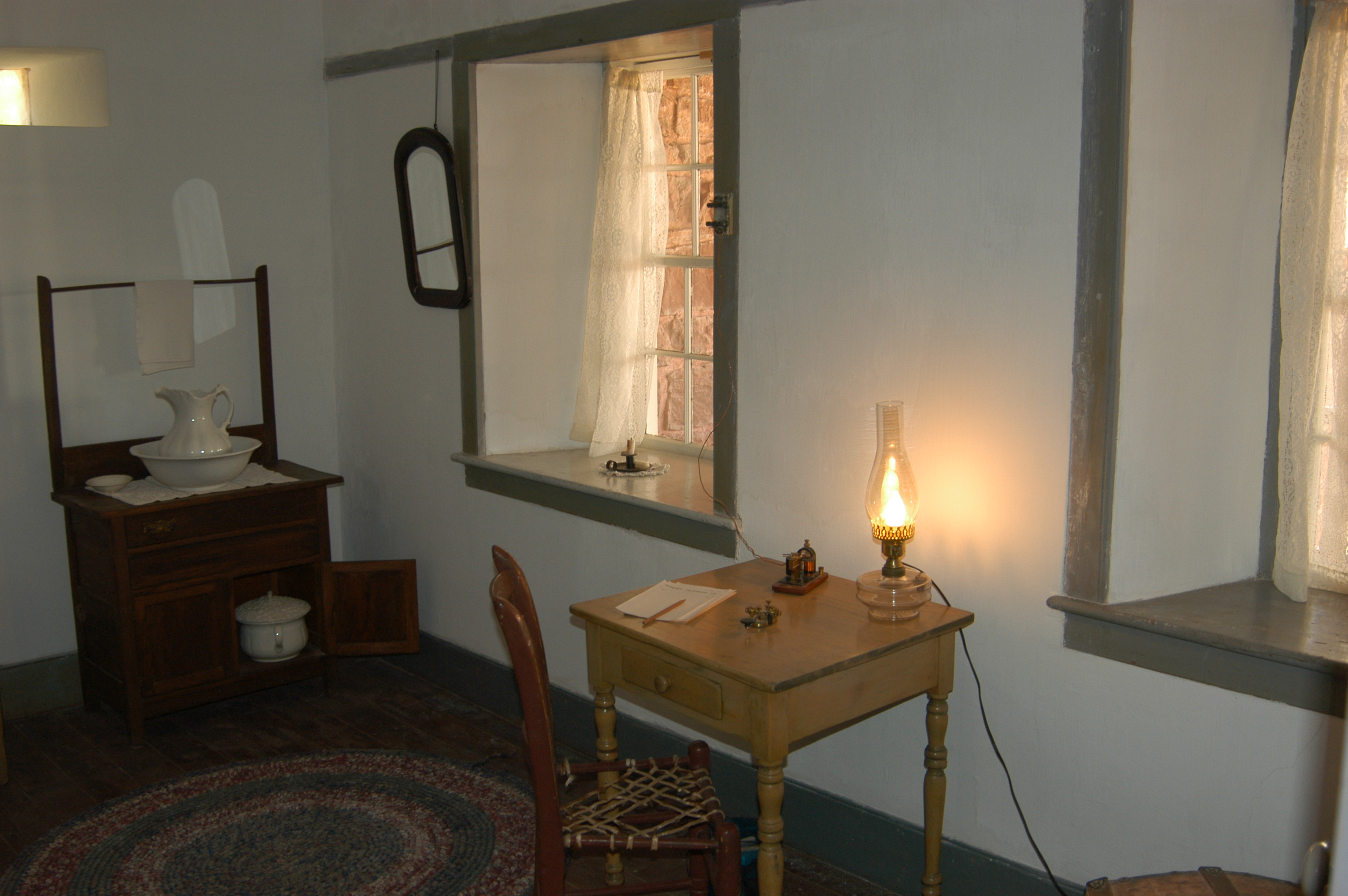
Pipe Spring's Deseret Telegraph office, the first such office in Arizona

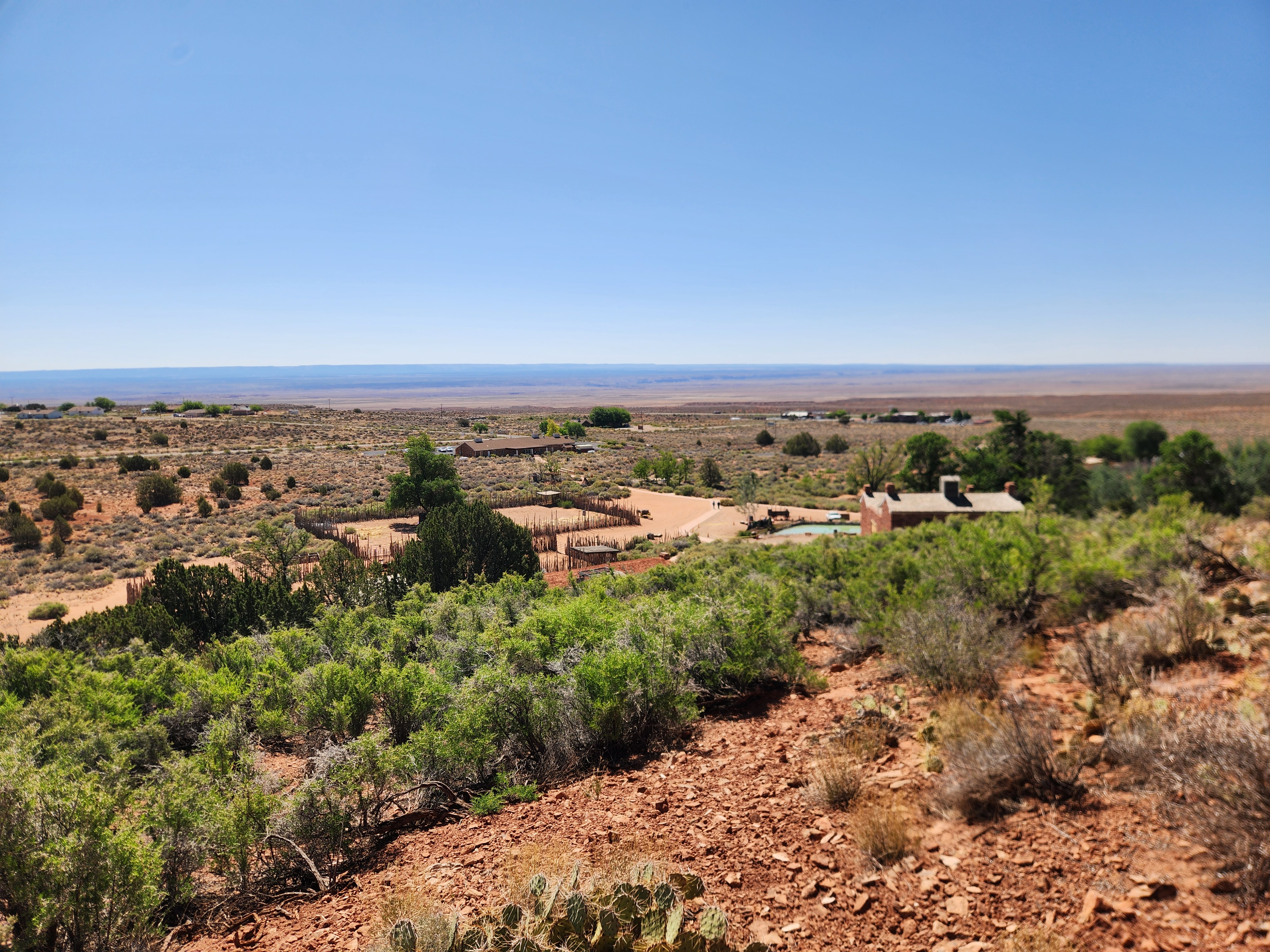
Pipe Springs National Monument, May 20, 2025

Pipe Spring National Monument is a United States National Monument located in the U.S. state of Arizona, rich with American Indian, early explorer, and Mormon pioneer history. Administered by the National Park Service, Pipe Spring was listed on the National Register of Historic Places on October 15, 1966, and the boundaries of the Pipe Spring National Monument Historic District (a portion of the monument) were expanded in October 2000.

== History ==
The water of Pipe Spring has made it possible for plants, animals, and people to live in this dry desert region. Ancestral Puebloans and Kaibab Paiute Indians gathered grass seeds, hunted animals, and raised crops near the springs for at least 1,000 years.

Antonio Armijo discovered the springs when he passed through the area in 1829, when he established by the Armijo Route of the Old Spanish Trail.

Pipe Spring was named by the 1858 Latter-day Saint missionary expedition to the Hopi mesas led by Jacob Hamblin. In the 1860s Mormon pioneers from St. George, Utah, led by James M. Whitmore brought cattle to the area, and a large cattle ranching operation was established. In 1866 the Apache, Navajo and Paiute tribes of the region joined the Utes for the Black Hawk War, and, after they raided Pipe Spring, a protective fort was constructed by 1872 over the main spring. The following year the fort and ranch was purchased by Brigham Young for the Church of Jesus Christ of Latter-day Saints (LDS Church). The LDS Bishop of nearby Grafton, Utah, Anson Perry Winsor, was hired to operate the ranch and maintain the fort, soon called Winsor Castle. This isolated outpost served as a way station for people traveling across the Arizona Strip, that part of Arizona separated from the rest of the state by the Grand Canyon. It also served as a refuge for polygamist wives during the 1880s and 1890s. The LDS Church lost ownership of the property through penalties involved in the federal Edmunds-Tucker Act of 1887.

Although their way of life was greatly impacted by Mormon settlement, the Paiute Indians continued to live in the area and by 1907 the Kaibab Paiute Indian Reservation was established, surrounding the privately owned Pipe Spring ranch. In 1923, the Pipe Spring ranch was purchased and set aside as a national monument to be a memorial to western pioneer life.

== The site today ==
Today the Pipe Spring National Monument, Kaibab Band of Paiute Indians Visitor Center, and Museum explain the human history of the area over time. Daily tours of Winsor Castle, summer "living history" demonstrations, an orchard and garden, and a half-mile trail offer a glimpse of American Indian and pioneer life in the Old West. The Paiute tribe runs a small adjoining campground.

== Climate ==
Pipe Spring National Monument has a semi-arid climate (Köppen: BSk) with cold winters and hot summers.

Climate data for Pipe Spring National Monument, Arizona, 1991–2020 normals, extremes 1963–present
Month	Jan	Feb	Mar	Apr	May	Jun	Jul	Aug	Sep	Oct	Nov	Dec	Year
Record high °F (°C)	79 (26)	78 (26)	85 (29)	91 (33)	99 (37)	110 (43)	109 (43)	105 (41)	104 (40)	93 (34)	79 (26)	69 (21)	110 (43)
Mean maximum °F (°C)	59.3 (15.2)	65.6 (18.7)	75.4 (24.1)	83.3 (28.5)	91.0 (32.8)	99.6 (37.6)	103.1 (39.5)	99.5 (37.5)	94.6 (34.8)	85.4 (29.7)	72.1 (22.3)	60.6 (15.9)	103.5 (39.7)
Mean daily maximum °F (°C)	47.8 (8.8)	52.3 (11.3)	60.9 (16.1)	67.8 (19.9)	77.7 (25.4)	89.3 (31.8)	94.3 (34.6)	91.8 (33.2)	84.5 (29.2)	71.7 (22.1)	58.6 (14.8)	46.8 (8.2)	70.3 (21.3)
Daily mean °F (°C)	35.4 (1.9)	39.2 (4.0)	45.9 (7.7)	51.9 (11.1)	61.3 (16.3)	71.4 (21.9)	77.8 (25.4)	76.0 (24.4)	68.2 (20.1)	55.9 (13.3)	44.1 (6.7)	34.5 (1.4)	55.1 (12.8)
Mean daily minimum °F (°C)	23.0 (−5.0)	26.0 (−3.3)	30.8 (−0.7)	36.1 (2.3)	45.0 (7.2)	53.5 (11.9)	61.2 (16.2)	60.2 (15.7)	51.9 (11.1)	40.0 (4.4)	29.7 (−1.3)	22.3 (−5.4)	40.0 (4.4)
Mean minimum °F (°C)	9.3 (−12.6)	13.1 (−10.5)	19.4 (−7.0)	24.6 (−4.1)	30.9 (−0.6)	41.0 (5.0)	51.0 (10.6)	51.1 (10.6)	39.5 (4.2)	26.9 (−2.8)	14.3 (−9.8)	7.4 (−13.7)	4.7 (−15.2)
Record low °F (°C)	−12 (−24)	−8 (−22)	4 (−16)	8 (−13)	20 (−7)	33 (1)	40 (4)	38 (3)	28 (−2)	10 (−12)	0 (−18)	−13 (−25)	−13 (−25)
Average precipitation inches (mm)	1.41 (36)	1.38 (35)	1.06 (27)	0.66 (17)	0.52 (13)	0.19 (4.8)	1.14 (29)	1.30 (33)	1.06 (27)	1.08 (27)	0.55 (14)	1.05 (27)	11.40 (290)
Average snowfall inches (cm)	0.3 (0.76)	2.1 (5.3)	1.2 (3.0)	0.4 (1.0)	0.0 (0.0)	0.0 (0.0)	0.0 (0.0)	0.0 (0.0)	0.0 (0.0)	0.0 (0.0)	0.8 (2.0)	1.0 (2.5)	5.8 (15)
Average precipitation days (≥ 0.01 inch)	5.4	6.2	4.7	3.3	3.8	1.6	5.2	6.8	4.2	4.4	2.7	4.5	52.8
Average snowy days (≥ 0.1 inch)	0.7	1.3	0.6	0.3	0.0	0.0	0.0	0.0	0.0	0.0	0.3	1.4	4.6
Source: NOAA

== See also ==
- List of national monuments of the United States
- Ella Stewart Udall
- The Church of Jesus Christ of Latter-day Saints in Arizona
