= World Turkic Language Family Day =

International day observed annually on 15 December

- Official name: World Turkic Language Family Day
- Type: International day
- Date: 15 December
- Frequency: Annual
- First time: 2025 (proclaimed)
- Related to: Turkic languages; Orkhon inscriptions; multilingualism

World Turkic Language Family Day is an international day observed annually on 15 December. It was proclaimed in 2025 by the General Conference of the United Nations Educational, Scientific and Cultural Organization (UNESCO) to promote linguistic and cultural diversity and to support the preservation and development of oral traditions and expressions.

== Background ==
The proposal for the observance was submitted by Azerbaijan, Kazakhstan, Kyrgyzstan, Türkiye and Uzbekistan and supported by 21 member states. It was examined by the executive board and subsequently placed on the agenda of the 43rd session of the general conference, held in Samarkand in 2025, which proclaimed 15 December of each year as World Turkic Language Family Day.

== Date and historical significance ==
The chosen date commemorates 15 December 1893, when the Danish linguist Vilhelm Thomsen announced the decipherment of the Orkhon inscriptions. These inscriptions are among the earliest known written sources demonstrating the historical roots of the Turkic language family.

== Purpose ==
The observance aims to raise awareness of the cultural, historical and social significance of the Turkic language family, to encourage academic research and international cooperation, and to contribute to the safeguarding of shared linguistic and documentary heritage.

Languages of the Turkic language family are spoken natively by more than 200 million people across several states, covering an area of approximately 12 million square kilometres.

== Observance ==
World Turkic Language Family Day is marked through cultural and educational activities such as exhibitions, lectures, literature events and artistic performances, intended to highlight the contribution of the Turkic language family to global cultural diversity.

== International context ==
The proclamation also recalls international efforts to promote multilingualism, including United Nations General Assembly Resolution 71/328 on multilingualism, adopted in 2017.

== See also ==
- Turkic languages
- Orkhon inscriptions
- Vilhelm Thomsen
- Multilingualism
