= David King Udall =

American politician (1851–1938)

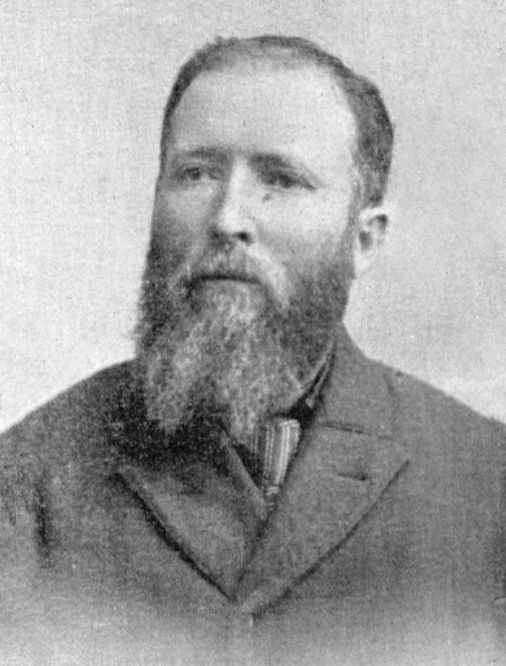

Arizona Territorial Legislature

In office
- 1899
- Political party: Republican

Personal details
- Born: September 7, 1851; St. Louis, Missouri, United States
- Died: February 18, 1938 (aged 86); St. Johns, Arizona, United States
- Resting place: Saint Johns Cemetery; 34.5144°N 109.3720°W
- Spouse(s): Ella Stewart (m. 1875) Ida Frances Hunt (m. 1882) Mary Ann Linton Morgan (m. 1903)
- Parents: David Udall; Eliza King

David King Udall, Sr. (September 7, 1851 – February 18, 1938) was an American politician who was a representative to the Arizona Territorial Legislature and the founder of the Udall political family.

== Childhood years ==
David King Udall was born in St. Louis, Missouri. His parents, David Udall and Eliza King, had immigrated to the United States from England earlier in the year. In 1852 they followed the Mormon Trail to Utah. They settled in Nephi, Utah. Udall spent his childhood farming. As a teenager, he spent a short period as a laborer building the Union Pacific Railroad which became part of the First transcontinental railroad.

== Early adulthood ==
In 1875, Udall married his first wife, Eliza Luella Stewart. Shortly thereafter he was called by the LDS Church on a mission to England, where he remained until 1877. In 1880, while again living in Nephi, Udall was called to be the Mormon bishop in St. Johns, Arizona. At the time, St. Johns was a small and primarily Hispanic Catholic community. Immediately after moving his family there, Udall purchased lands and directed improvements geared toward creating a larger Mormon settlement of the area.

== Polygamy and imprisonment ==
In 1882, Udall took a second wife, Ida Frances Hunt, a granddaughter of Jefferson Hunt (1803–1879) and also through her mother of Lois Barnes Pratt (1802–1880) and Addison Pratt (1802–1872). That same year the U.S. Congress passed the Edmunds Act to aid in the prosecution of polygamists. Udall was indicted on charges of unlawful cohabitation in 1884. He was never convicted, because his second wife lived in another town, and prosecutors could not locate Ida to compel her testimony against him.

Prosecutors remained determined to make an example of Udall, and in 1885, he was indicted and convicted on perjury charges, related to a sworn statement he made about the land claim of a fellow Mormon. He spent three months in a Federal Prison in Detroit, Michigan, before receiving a full and unconditional pardon by President Grover Cleveland on December 12, 1885. The perjury conviction stemmed from an affidavit he swore on the land claim of Miles P. Romney (grandfather of George Romney).

== Later years ==
Udall was appointed to be a Stake president, a higher position in the LDS leadership, in 1887. He held that position for the next 35 years. Throughout that time he ran a number of business ventures of varying success.

From 1899 to 1900, Udall represented Apache County in the Arizona Territorial Senate. He was elected as a Republican.

In 1903, he discreetly married the former Mary Ann Linton, widow of John Hamilton Morgan (1842–1894), who had been a representative to the Utah Territorial Legislature. This marriage ran contrary to the LDS Church's decision to ban polygamy in 1890. Years later Matthias F. Cowley, the official who performed the ceremony, was stripped of his priesthood by the LDS Church. When the marriage came to light, Udall was never sanctioned, but he was forced to cease marital relations with Mary. He did, however, continue to support her and her children (from her marriage to Morgan) financially until the children reached adulthood.

In 1906, a Prescott Federal Grand Jury indicted Udall and several others on charges of polygamy, which was a violation of the Edmunds Act. After Ben Daniels, a federal marshal, served Udall and the others, they went to Prescott and paid their fines of $100, and then went back home.

From 1927 to 1934 he served as the president of the LDS Mesa Arizona Temple.

His wives, Ida and Eliza, preceded him in death in 1915 and 1937, respectively. He died in 1938 in St. Johns, Arizona. David Udall's surviving children included two state supreme court justices and a mayor of Phoenix. Stewart Udall, Arizona Congressman and 1961–1969 Secretary of Interior, and his brother Morris Udall, also an Arizona Congressmen, were two of David Udall's grandchildren. His great-grandson Tom represented the state of New Mexico in the United States Senate from 2009–2021.

== Works ==
- Udall, David King; Nelson, Pearl Udall (1959), Arizona Pioneer Mormon: David King Udall: His Story and His Family, Silhouettes Press, OCLC 183273056 Full text online.

== See also ==
- William J. Flake
- List of people pardoned or granted clemency by the president of the United States

== Sources ==
- Eby, Jay W. (November 2009). "Ben Daniels: Felon, Rough Rider and Arizona Marshal" (PDF). Territorial Times. Vol. 3, no. 1. pp. 19–22. Archived (PDF) from the original on October 22, 2014.
- Lemons, Stephen (September 26, 2019). "A Different Kind of Udall". Phoenix.
- Smith, Zachary; Thrash, Molly E. (2018). "The Udall Dynasty". In Gronnerud, Kathleen A.; Spitzer, Scott J. (eds.). Modern American Political Dynasties: A Study of Power, Family, and Political Influence. ABC-CLIO. pp. 329–341. ISBN 978-1-4408-5442-2.
