= Ella Stewart Udall =

American Latter-day Saint telegraphist and entrepreneur (1855–1937)

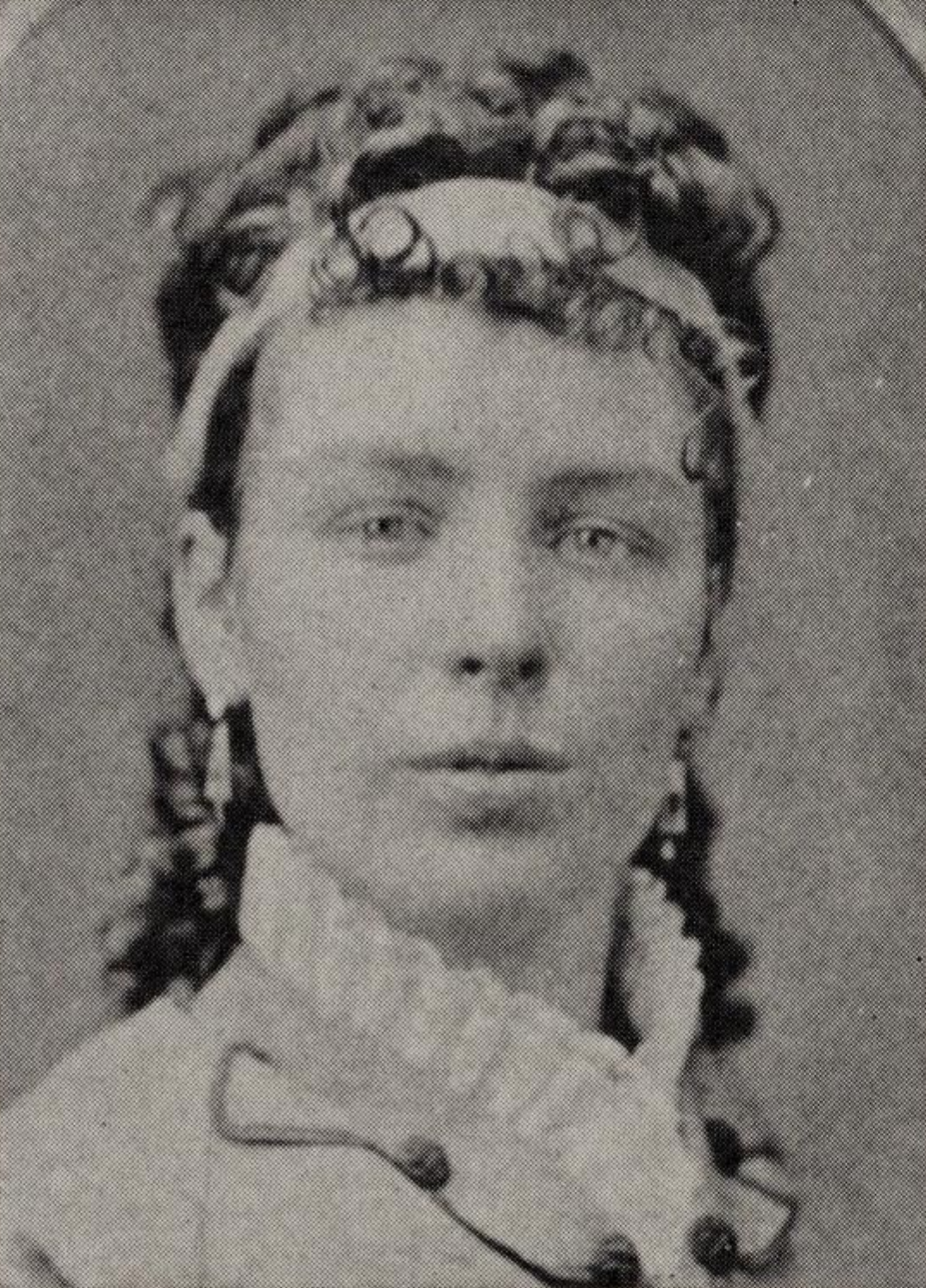
- Udall in 1875
- Born: Eliza Luella Stewart; May 21, 1855; Salt Lake City, Utah Territory, U.S.
- Died: May 28, 1937 (aged 82); St. Johns, Arizona, U.S.
- Burial place: St. Johns, Arizona, U.S.
- Known for: First telegraph operator in Arizona Territory
- Spouses: David King Udall (married 1875); Ida Hunt Udall (became co-wives 1882); Mary Linton Morgan (became co-wives 1903)

Eliza Luella "Ella" Stewart Udall (May 21, 1855 – May 28, 1937) was an American telegraphist and entrepreneur. Recruited by Brigham Young in 1870 and stationed at the Deseret Telegraph Company office in Pipe Spring in 1871, Udall was the first telegraph operator in Arizona Territory.

A daughter of Mormon pioneers Margery Wilkerson Stewart and Levi Stewart, Udall was a member of the Church of Jesus Christ of Latter-day Saints her entire life. As part of the church's historical practice of polygamy, she was the first wife of David King Udall and co-wife of Ida Hunt Udall and later Mary Ann Linton Morgan. Udall also ran a successful ice cream parlor in St. Johns, Arizona and for a time managed the Apache Hotel in Holbrook, Arizona. Several of Udall's descendants went on to have influential political careers as members of the Udall family.

== Early life ==
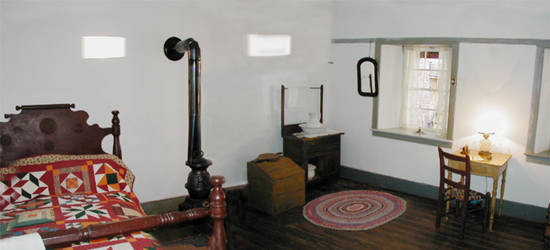
Ella's quarters at Pipe Spring National Monument, with a recreation of the telegraph terminal

Eliza Luella "Ella" Stewart was born on May 21, 1855, in Salt Lake City to parents Levi Stewart and Margery Wilkerson Stewart, both members of the Church of Jesus Christ of Latter-day Saints (also known as Mormons). Levi Stewart was also married to Ella's aunt and Margery's sister, Artemacy "Macy" Wilkerson, as the family participated in the church's historical practice of polygamy. Growing up in Salt Lake City, Stewart attended private schools and was taught by poet Sarah Elizabeth Carmichael and educator Theodore Belden Lewis. She was baptized into the church in 1863.

The first telegraphed message from Arizona

"We have opened a telegraph office here this morning—Miss Ella Stewart, operator. Winsor Castle is progressing rapidly toward completion."

— A. Milton Musser, Deseret Telegraph Company superintendent; keyed by Ella Stewart at Pipe Spring, December 15, 1871

In 1870, LDS Church president Brigham Young asked Levi Stewart to move to southern Utah, found the town of Kanab, and serve as the first Latter-day Saint bishop there. Young also asked Ella Stewart to stop in Toquerville to learn Morse code and telegraphy so she could work as a telegraph operator for the Deseret Telegraph Company. Stewart trained in Toquerville for at least six weeks before rejoining her family in Kanab.

On December 14, 1870, Stewart's mother Margery and five of her brothers died in a house fire. Artemacy Stewart, Margery's sister and co-wife, took Ella Stewart in as one of her own.

Starting in December 1871, when Stewart was sixteen years old, she was stationed in the Deseret Telegraphy Company office in Pipe Spring, Arizona, making her the first telegraphist in Pipe Spring and in the territory. Stewart was also the first telegraphist at the Kanab office (established in her father's home), where she telegraphed to Washington, D. C. reports from John Wesley Powell's second expedition to the Grand Canyon.

== Adulthood ==
=== Early marriage ===
Stewart met David King Udall in 1873 when she joined her father on a visit to the Udall family. David Udall wrote of the encounter that "the fair, slender girl with clear blue eyes took my heart away with her". After courting for two years, Stewart and Udall married in the Salt Lake City Endowment House on February 1, 1875. Only six weeks into their marriage, the LDS Church assigned David Udall to proselytize as a missionary in England, and Ella Udall returned to Kanab, where she worked as a telegraphist again and as a bookkeeper for a church-endorsed Co-op store.

After twenty-seven months away as a missionary, David returned to Utah, reuniting with Ella Udall. They lived briefly in Nephi and then Kanab, and Udall gave birth to their first child, a daughter they named Pearl (b. 1880). In October 1880, the Udalls moved to St. Johns, Arizona in response to the church calling David to serve as bishop there. David also was superintendent of a Co-op store. Eliza Udall was appointed as secretary of the Relief Society in the St. Johns Ward.

In 1881, David Udall hired Ida Frances Hunt, a Latter-day Saint then living in Snowflake, Arizona, to work for the St. Johns Co-op as a clerk, and she moved there in the fall, where she boarded with Ella and David Udall. That winter, David Udall asked Hunt if she would be interested in marrying him as a plural wife. David and Ella Udall had talked about plural marriage before. Moved by her experience with her mother's co-wife, Ella Udall expressed openness to the practice in the abstract, but she was more uncomfortable with the prospect of polygamy in her own marriage.

Excerpt from Ella Udall's letter to Ida Hunt

"The subject in question has caused me a great amount of pain and sorrow, perhaps more than you could imagine, yet I feel as I have from the beginning that if it is the Lord's will I am perfectly willing to try to endure it and trust it will be overruled for the best good of all. My feelings are such that I can write but briefly on this subject.

"With kind regards to all, I remain your friend."

— Dated March 12, 1882, quoted in Mormon Odyssey, 44–45

Sensitive to Udall's feelings, Hunt left St. Johns to temporarily live with her family in Snowflake, and from there she wrote to Udall to ask for her permission to marry her husband. Udall did not respond immediately. In March 1882, she sent a letter giving her consent, although unenthusiastically, to Hunt plurally marrying David.

=== Plural marriage ===
Udall and her daughter Pearl accompanied David and Hunt to St. George, Utah. In the Latter-day Saint temple there, in Ella Udall's presence, Ida Hunt married David Udall as his plural wife. Ella and Ida Udall spent the wedding night together, and on their return journey to St. Johns they reconciled somewhat by having long, private conversations and reading novels out loud with one another. After a stay in Snowflake over the summer, Ida moved in with Ella and David on August 25, 1882.

Only two months before their plural marriage, Congress had passed the Edmunds Anti-Polygamy Act, outlawing polygamy and "unlawful cohabitation" and strengthening federal authority to prosecute cases, and in mid-1884, federal authorities indicted David Udall on a polygamy charge. Because calling plural wives to testify to their husbands' polygamous marriages was a known strategy of prosecutors, Ida Udall went into hiding to avoid being subpoenaed, and she lived away from Ella Udall and David Udall for several years. During this time, David and Ida only communicated through Ella Udall, who passed along David's letters to Ida under the false pretense of Ida being David's sister.

Ella Udall and Ida next saw each other in person in the summer of 1888. Ida Udall and her children had moved onto a farm in Round Valley, Arizona that David and his brothers had purchased. However, Ella Udall was still ambivalent about plural marriage. When the family struggled financially, David had Ida and her children move to Snowflake to temporarily live with Ida's family. For the next two years, Ida, Ella, and their respective children moved frequently between Snowflake, Round Valley, and St. Johns without significantly overlapping. The family did live together in one household for the winter of 1891–1892.

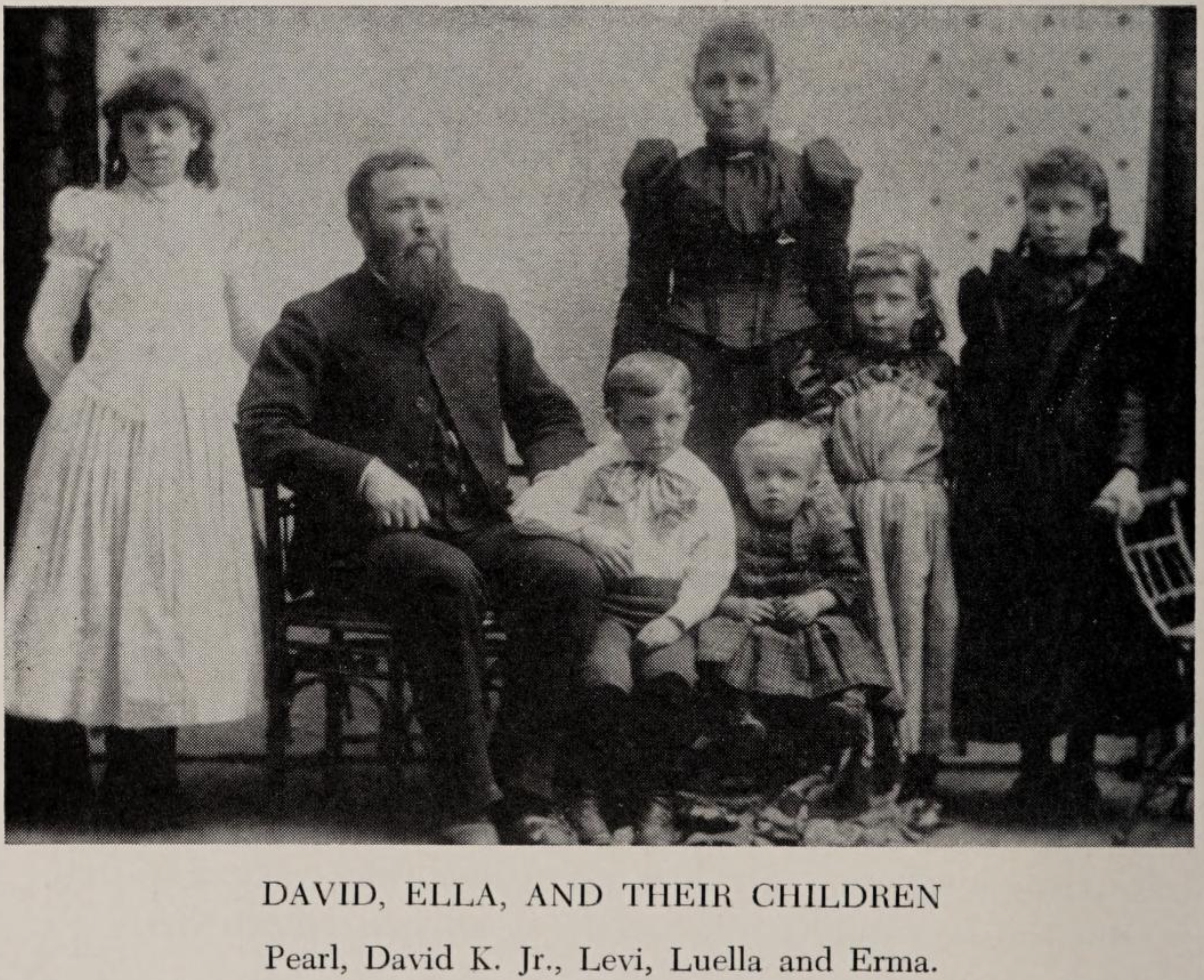
Ella (standing center) and David Udall (seated left) with their children.

=== Post-Manifesto ===
LDS Church president Wilford Woodruff issued a statement in 1890 publicly withdrawing the church's official sanction of polygamy and advising Latter-day Saints to obey federal anti-polygamy laws. By the spring of 1892, David Udall concluded that complying with this instruction required not cohabitating with Ida Udall, and she moved to Eagar, Arizona. However, in July, higher church leadership instructed the Udalls to remain a family. David restored contact with Ida, and she moved back to Round Valley to be with him and Ella in the spring of 1893, but for most of the rest of their lives, Ida Udall lived separately from Ella and David.

For many years, Ella, David, and Ida Udall lived a hard life in which the family's economic resources were thin. Ida Udall moved to Hunt, Arizona in 1903, and there she and her children managed a ranch. In 1903, Ella Udall and her daughters Pearl and Erma ran an ice cream parlor in St. Johns, and Udall later spent some time as manager of the Apache Hotel in Holbrook, Arizona. Since 1887, Udall had also served as president of the stake-level Relief Society in the St. Johns Stake.

Apostles John W. Taylor and Matthias F. Cowley spoke privately with David Udall in 1903 to ask him to marry a widow named Mary Ann Linton Morgan as a third wife. Ella Udall did not like this idea, but David eventually went ahead with it and quietly married Morgan. She and her children went to live with Ida Udall in Hunt.

After a series of strokes culminating in 1908 left Ida Udall paralyzed on her left side, Ella Udall's feelings toward Ida softened. Ida Udall's biographer reports that "Ever after, Ella was loving and gracious to Ida and her children" until Ida died in 1915.

== Later life ==
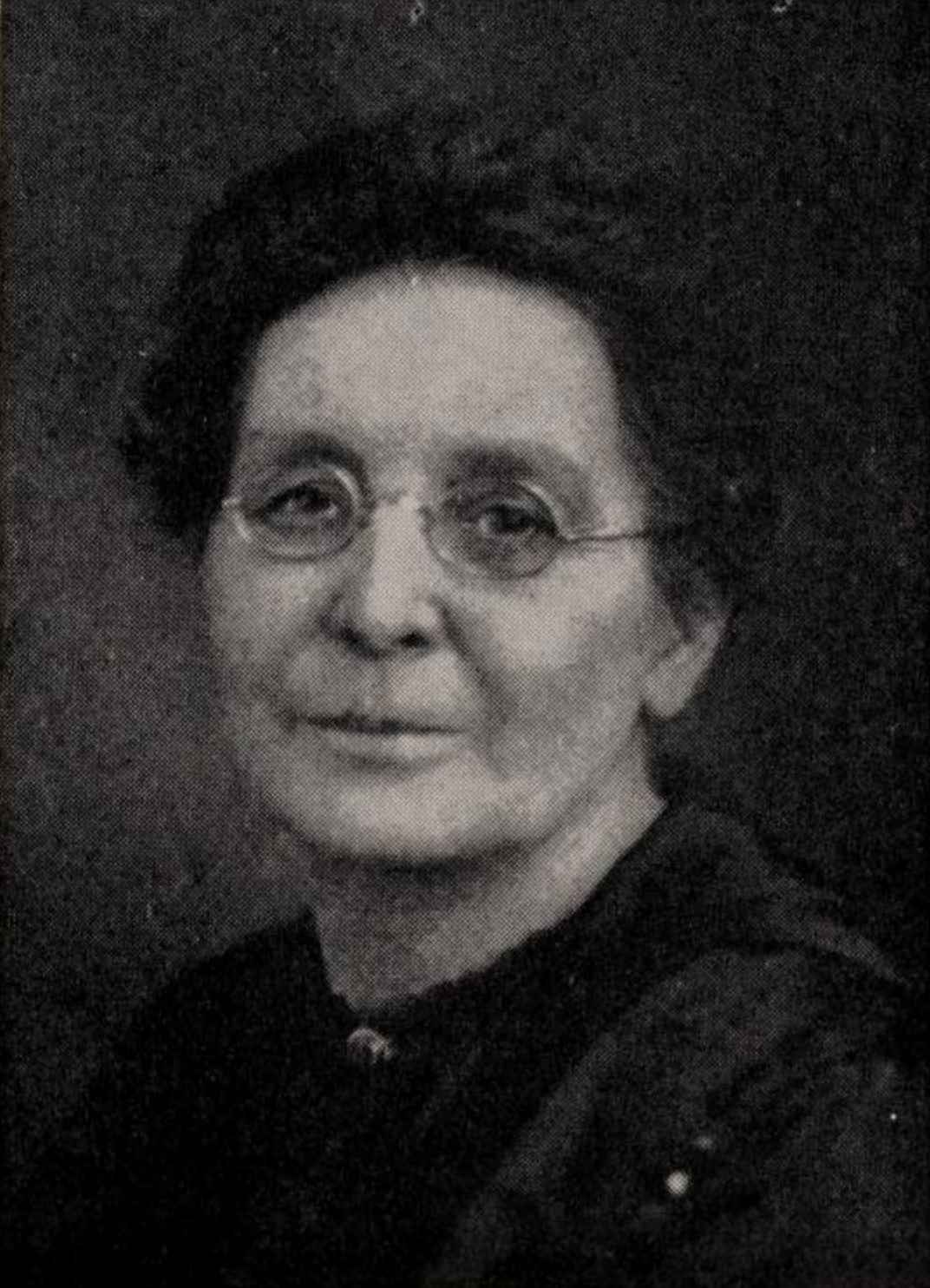
Ella Stewart Udall

Constructing on a city plot paid off with the ice cream parlor money Udall and her daughters had earned in 1903, the Udalls finishing building a family home for themselves in 1912. Ella Udall was stake Relief Society president for another ten years, until 1922. Udall and David celebrated their golden wedding anniversary in 1925. A few years later, the LDS Church called Udall and David to serve as temple matron and temple president, respectively, of the church's Mesa Arizona Temple, and they occupied that role from 1927 to 1934.

Udall died in St. Johns, Arizona on May 28, 1937, eighty-two years old, and was buried in St. Johns.

== Legacy ==
=== Family ===
Ella and David Udall had nine children together, five of whom survived infancy. Several of Udall's descendants went on to have influential careers in American politics. Her son, Levi Stewart Udall, was a judge on the Arizona Supreme Court from 1946 to 1960. Ella's grandson by Levi, Stewart Udall, became a representative in Congress, and from 1961 to 1969, he was Secretary of the Interior. Another grandson, Mo Udall, was a Congressman for 30 years, and he ran for President of the United States in 1976. Ella Udall is also great-grandmother to Mark Udall and Tom Udall, who both served in the Senate in the twenty-first century Scott Raymond Einberger suggests that Ella Udall exercised a significant influence on her family's politics as a "progressive woman" and "staunch supporter of women’s suffrage", in his words, as every descendant of hers to hold a political office up to 2018 was a liberal Democrat.

Udall's daughter Pearl went on to run a successful medical practice in Salt Lake City.

=== Pipe Spring National Monument ===
Pipe Spring National Monument was added to the National Park Service (NPS) on May 31, 1923. The site included the telegraph room where Udall had worked in her girlhood, and in 1968 supervisory historian Ray Geerdes acquired from her descendants the very telegraph table she had used. In the twenty-first century, NPS continues to maintain that telegraph room and recount Udall's role in Pipe Spring's history.

In 1969, Film Service Corporation (FSC) received NPS permission to use Pipe Spring as a set for their television series Death Valley Days. FSC filmed three episodes at the site in September 1968 and July 1969, one of which portrayed Ella Stewart (played by Lane Bradbury) in her role as a telegraph operator. Geerdes was disappointed by the show's relative disregard for historical accuracy, but otherwise he considered the filming crew well-behaved and noted they did not damage the historic site.

== See also ==
- The Church of Jesus Christ of Latter-day Saints in Arizona
- The Church of Jesus Christ of Latter-day Saints in Utah
- Northern Arizona
- Udall family
- Women in telegraphy
