= John Hamilton Morgan =

Union United States Army soldier

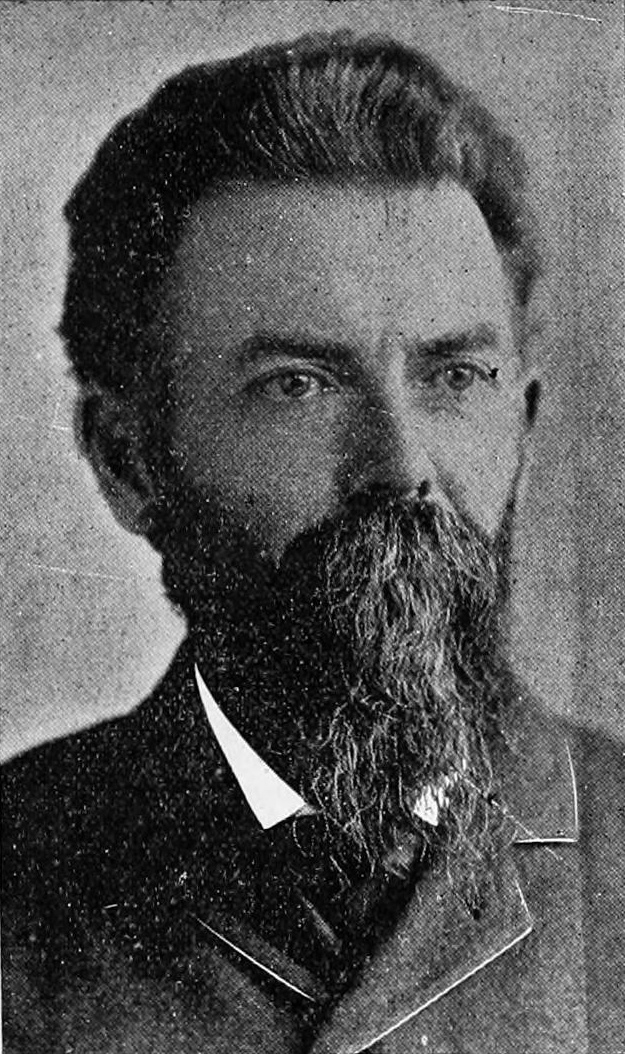

First Seven Presidents of the Seventy
- October 5, 1884 – August 14, 1894
- Called by: John Taylor

Personal details
- Born: August 8, 1842; Greensburg, Indiana, United States
- Died: August 14, 1894 (aged 52); Preston, Idaho, United States
- Resting place: Salt Lake City Cemetery; 40.777°N 111.858°W
- Spouse(s): Helen M. Groesbeck; Adalinda Mildred Smith; Mary Ann Linton; Eliza Jane Beeson
- Parents: Garrard Morgan; Eliza Ann Hamilton

John Hamilton Morgan (August 8, 1842 – August 14, 1894), was an early educator in Utah Territory, an official of the Church of Jesus Christ of Latter-day Saints (LDS Church), and a politician.

== Biography ==
Morgan was born in Greensburg, Decatur County, Indiana, and served as a sergeant in the Union Army in the 123rd Illinois Volunteer Infantry Regiment during the American Civil War. After the war he enrolled in Eastman's Commercial College in Poughkeepsie, New York. After graduation, he traveled to Salt Lake City on business, and decided to permanently relocate there.

In 1867 Morgan established the Morgan Commercial College in Salt Lake City, where he tapped a strong interest in business education. He moved the school into larger accommodations several times as enrollment increased. The college provided a number of innovations, including Utah's first free public library, and the first school run by a non-Mormon. The college taught many students that would later rise to prominence in Utah, including Heber J. Grant, Orson F. Whitney, Matthias F. Cowley, and J. Golden Kimball. The college lasted until 1874, when it closed due to intense competition from the University of Deseret (which later became the University of Utah). Although the University of Deseret was founded in 1850, it had been put in a 16-year hiatus until Morgan's success inspired its comeback.

On November 26, 1867, Morgan joined the LDS Church and on October 24, 1868, he married one of his former students, Helen Melvina Groesbeck. After the college closed in 1874, Morgan served as a missionary in the Southern States Mission from 1875 to 1877, returning to the mission again in 1878 to become the mission president. During his term as mission president he was involved with attempts to help the Catawba tribe move to the west to be with the rest of the Saints. On October 8, 1884, he became one of the seven presidents of the Quorums of the Seventy, filling the vacancy created by the death of William W. Taylor, son of church president John Taylor. Morgan served as a general authority for the last 10 years of his life.

Morgan also became involved in Utah politics, and served a term as a representative to the Utah Territorial Legislature as a Republican in 1883.

Morgan died unexpectedly from typhoid-malaria after a two-week convalescence in Preston, Idaho. He was a practicing polygamist, and all three wives outlived him. He was arrested on polygamy charges while visiting one of his wives in Manassa, Colorado. One of his widows, Mary Ann Linton (Morgan) was remarried to David King Udall.

== See also ==
- The Church of Jesus Christ of Latter-day Saints in Georgia (U.S. state)
