= The Lonely Polygamist =

Novel by Brady Udall

- First edition
- Author: Brady Udall
- Language: English
- Publisher: W. W. Norton & Company
- Publication date: 2010
- Dewey Decimal: 813.54
- LC Class: PS3571.D36 L66

The Lonely Polygamist is the second novel written by Brady Udall. It was published in 2010 by W. W. Norton & Company. According to Udall, after writing a nonfiction piece in 1998 for Esquire called "Big Love," about modern day polygamy, "there was no question my next novel would be about contemporary polygamy."

The novel follows the Richards family, focusing mainly on Golden, who is a polygamist, and the husband to four wives and father of twenty-eight children.

== Reception ==
The book was generally well received by critics. Entertainment Weekly named it the best book of 2010. It was called "a serious contender for Great American Novel status" by Publishers Weekly. The Chicago Tribune says "Udall's control over his complex plot, and his psychological insight into his characters, are admirable and impressive. But perhaps the most pleasing thing about 'The Lonely Polygamist' is the way it avoids giving in to the prurient interests that could easily have dominated a novel about polygamy."
