= Deseret Telegraph Company =

American telegraph company

- Type: Public
- Industry: Telegraphy
- Founded: January 18, 1867; 159 years ago in Salt Lake City, Utah, United States
- Founder: Brigham Young
- Defunct: April 1900; 126 years ago
- Fate: Dissolved, assets sold
- Successor: Assets acquired by Western Union
- Headquarters: Salt Lake City, Utah, United States
- Area served: Utah, parts of Arizona, Idaho, and Nevada
- Key people: A. Milton Musser (First superintendent); George Q. Cannon (First treasurer)
- Owner: The Church of Jesus Christ of Latter-day Saints, and private stockholders

The Deseret Telegraph Company (/ˌdɛzəˈrɛt/) was a telegraphy company headquartered in Salt Lake City, Utah, United States. The company was organized in 1867 to direct operation of the recently completed Deseret Telegraph Line; its largest stakeholder was the Church of Jesus Christ of Latter-day Saints (LDS Church). The Deseret line ran north and south through the Utah Territory, connecting the numerous settlements with Salt Lake City and the First Transcontinental Telegraph. The company was dissolved in 1900 when its assets, including the Deseret line, were sold to the Western Union Telegraph Company.

== Constructing the Deseret Telegraph Line ==
On June 16, 1860, the 36th United States Congress had passed the Pacific Telegraph Act of 1860, allowing the federal government to facilitate and seek bids on the construction of a telegraph line connecting the Eastern United States with the country's West. This act resulted in the First Transcontinental Telegraph, which was completed October 24, 1861 when a line from the East and a line from the West met in a telegraph office in Salt Lake City, Utah.

Utah's Mormon settlers—members of the Church of Jesus Christ of Latter-day Saints—had supplied labor, food, and transportation for the line, along with poles for about 1,000 miles (1,600 km) of its length. Church president Brigham Young served as contractor for supplying the materials and labor, bring $11,000 in gold to the LDS Church ($394,167 in today's terms). Completion of the transcontinental line raised the question of constructing another line to connect the numerous Mormon settlements in the Utah Territory. In February 1861, Brigham Young expressed his desire for a local territorial line, and a telegraphy school was established in Salt Lake City. Yet construction on the line was not started until 1865, due mainly to complications caused by the American Civil War.

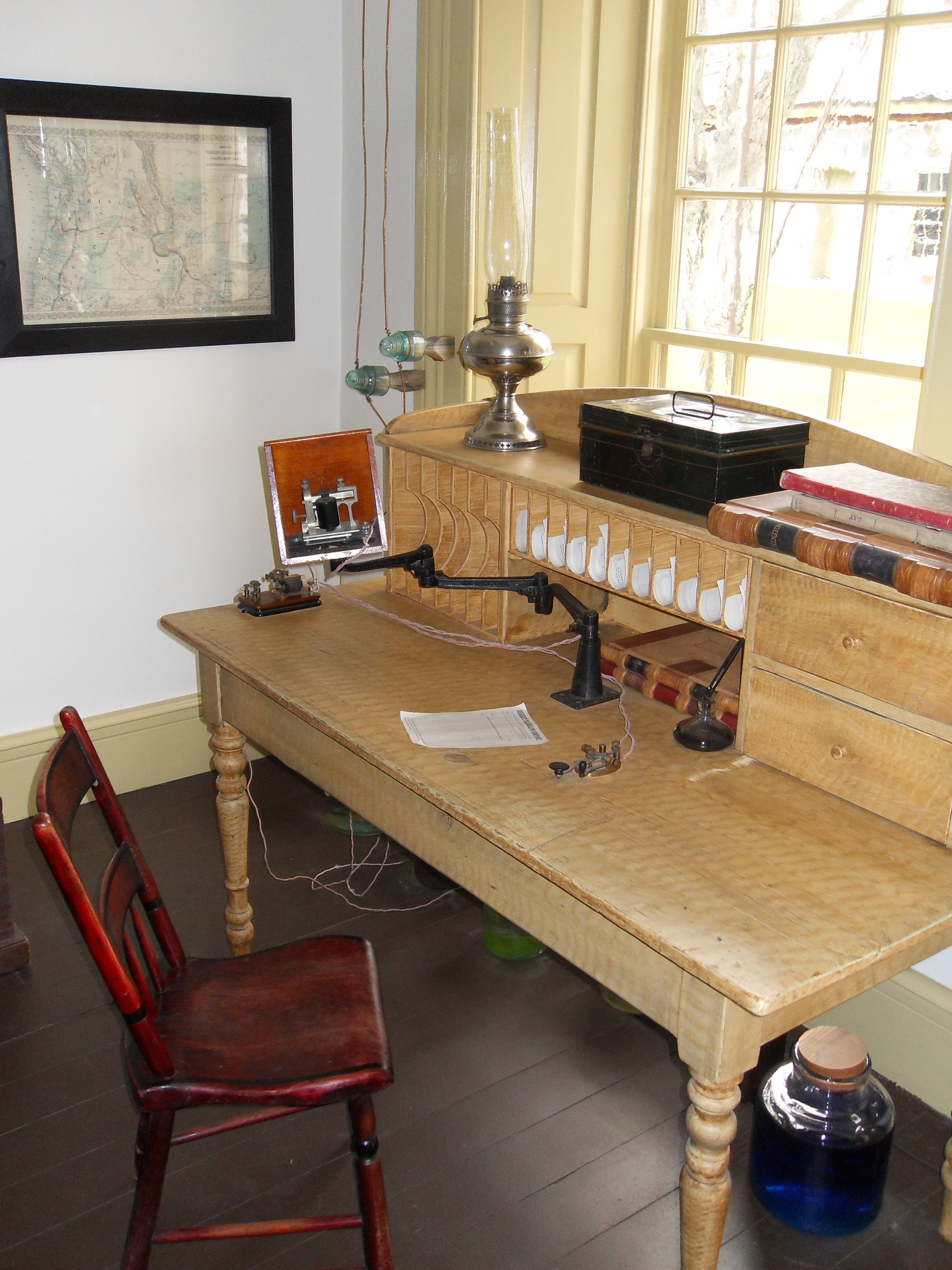
The restored telegraph office at Cove Fort. Among the reasons for constructing the fort was to protect the Deseret Telegraph Line.

On November 9, 1865, a letter was published by the Deseret News from LDS Church Headquarters to the various leaders in settlements up and down the territory. The letter included instructions that each settlement would be responsible for constructing the segment of the line near their community, and laid out steps that needed to be completed immediately. Money or other means were collected to purchase the wires, insulators, and other equipment, while poles—22 feet long, and as straight as possible—were to be cut and placed by the settlers. The co-operative efforts of the line's construction made it the first publicly constructed and owned telegraph line in the United States.

By the fall of 1866 all the poles had been set, and wire was being strung out from Salt Lake City; resulting in communities close to the Salt Lake Valley being connected to the system sooner than more distant settlements. On December 1, 1866, the line was completed from Salt Lake City to Ogden, Utah and Brigham Young sent the first message across the Deseret line to other Church leaders in Ogden. On January 15, 1867, the line was completed between its northern terminus in Logan and southern terminus in St. George. Later the line was extended north to Paris, Idaho, and south to Pipe Springs, Arizona, with extensions into the Sanpete and Sevier Valleys, Tooele, Gunnison, Kanab, and several mining districts, such as Tintic and Frisco in Utah, along with Bullionville and Panaca in Nevada.

== Operations ==
The Utah Territorial Assembly incorporated the Deseret Telegraph Company on January 18, 1867, to direct operation of the Deseret line. The company had issued 5,000 shares of stock, with the vast majority held by the LDS Church (the Church President would also serve as president of the telegraph company).

Because of the unique co-operative ownership of the company, rates were set much differently than other contemporary telegraph companies. Only for messages between Ogden and Salt Lake City was a per-word-per-mile rate charged (the common rate system for telegraphy). Most communities paid a monthly sum, and could receive so many words per month depending on the amount paid. Most territorial and Church communications were sent free of charge, as was local personal and community correspondence. As a result, very rarely was the company able to make a profit, running in the red numerous times (LDS Church tithes were often used to make up the difference).

Passage of the Edmunds–Tucker Act in 1887 led to the United States government confiscating the company in 1888. In 1894 ownership of the company was returned to the LDS Church.

== Acquisition ==
On February 20, 1900, the Western Union Telegraph Company (who had built the first transcontinental telegraph line) purchased the assets of the Deseret Telegraph Company from the LDS Church for $10,000 ($387,000 in today's terms) with the remainder of the stockholders receiving $2.00 per share ($77 in today's terms). The line was turned over on April 4, 1900, and its operations absorbed into the Western Union company.

== See also ==
- Ella Stewart Udall
