= List of people from Arizona =

State flag of Arizona

Location of Arizona in the United States

The following are people either born, raised, or have lived for a significant period of time in the U.S. state of Arizona and/or the Arizona Territory.

== Academia ==
- Russell Merle Genet – research scholar and astronomer
- Joseph Hilbe (1944–2017) – statistician, professor, and author
- Craig D. Idso – founder and chairman of the board of the Center for the Study of Carbon Dioxide and Global Change
- Percival Lowell (1855–1916) – astronomer and founder of the Lowell Observatory
- Julia Robinson – mathematician
- Larry T. Wimmer – professor of economics
- Roger L. Worsley – educator

== Art, literature, and poetry ==
=== Art ===
- Max Cannon (born 1962) – alternative cartoonist
- Bil Keane (1922–2011) – cartoonist
- James Rallison (born 1996) – cartoonist and YouTuber
- Paolo Soleri (1919–2013) – architect

=== Literature ===
- Clive Cussler (1931–2020) – author of the Dirk Pitt adventure novels and shipwreck explorer, part-time resident
- Diana Gabaldon (born 1952) – novelist
- Kevin Hearne (born 1970) – novelist
- Harold L. Humes (1926–1992) – novelist, co-founder of The Paris Review
- Stephenie Meyer (born 1973) – author, teen literature novelist, Twilight series
- Barbara Park (1947–2013) – author of the Junie B. Jones series
- Barrett Tillman (born 1948) – novelist and military historian
- Brady Udall (born 1971) – author
- Mary Whitebird (died 2010) – author

=== Poetry ===
- Ai (1947–2010) – poet and educator
- Jon Anderson (1940–2007) – poet and educator
- Jayne Cortez (1934–2012) – poet, activist, small press publisher and spoken-word performance artist
- Norman Dubie (born 1945) – poet, educator, Regents Professor of English at Arizona State University
- Alberto Ríos (born 1952) – poet, author, Arizona's first state poet laureate, Regents Professor and Katharine C. Turner Endowed Chair in English at Arizona State University
- Richard Shelton (born 1933) – poet, writer, and emeritus Regents Professor of English at the University of Arizona
- Jim Simmerman (1952–2006) – poet and editor
- Luci Tapahonso (born 1953) – poet and educator
- Ofelia Zepeda (born 1952) – poet and educator

== Business ==
- Steve Jurvetson, businessman and venture capitalist, was involved in companies including D-Wave, SpaceX and Tesla

== Film, television, and theater ==
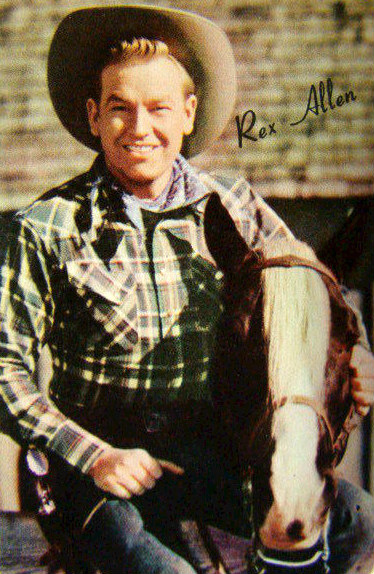
Rex Allen

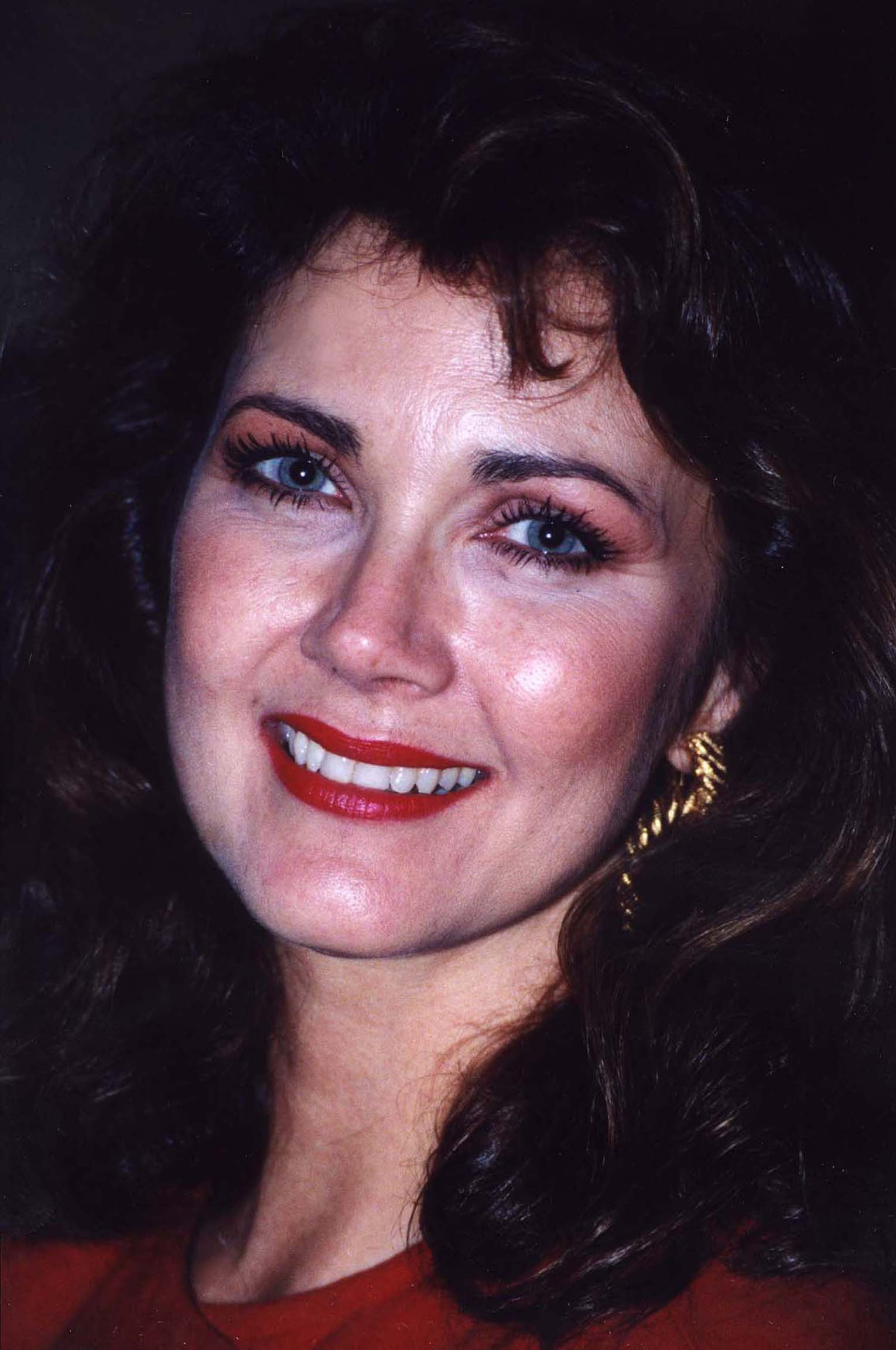
Lynda Carter

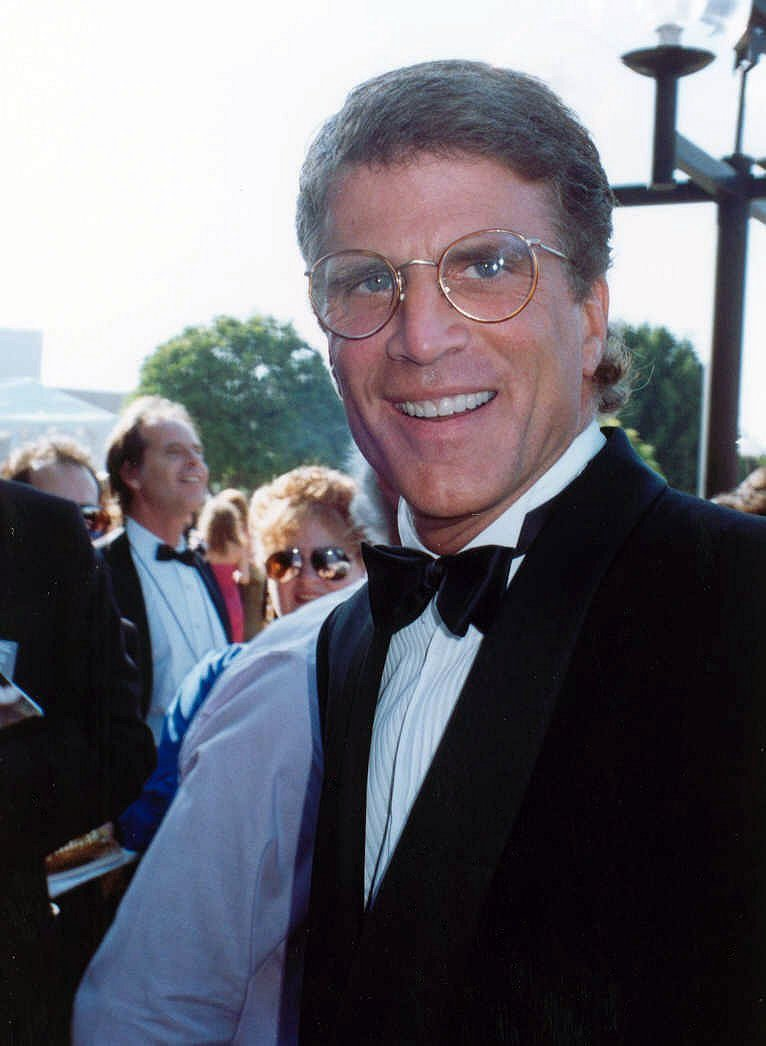
Ted Danson

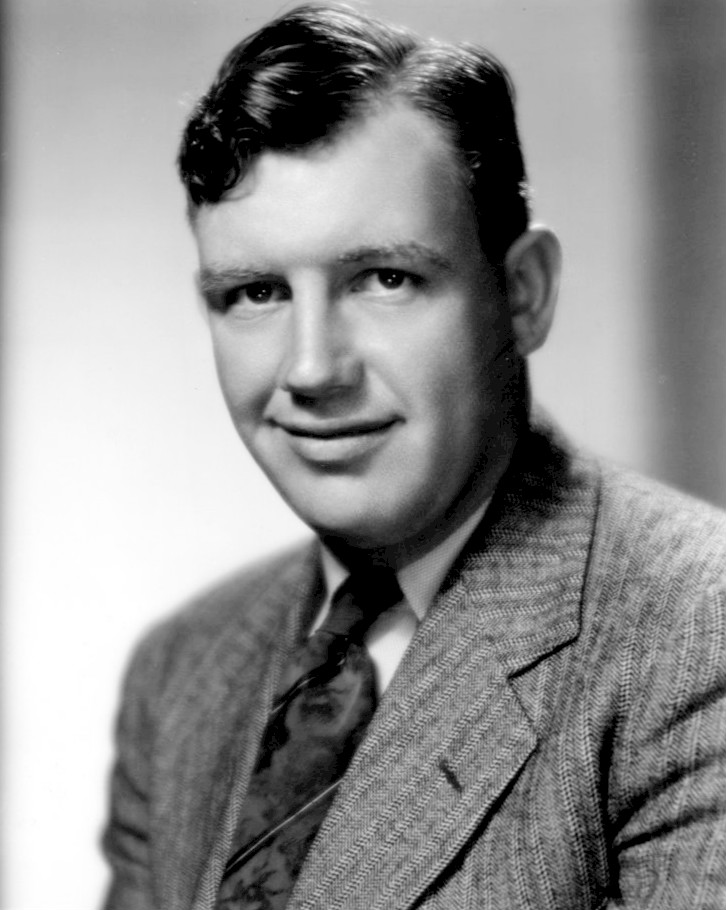
Andy Devine

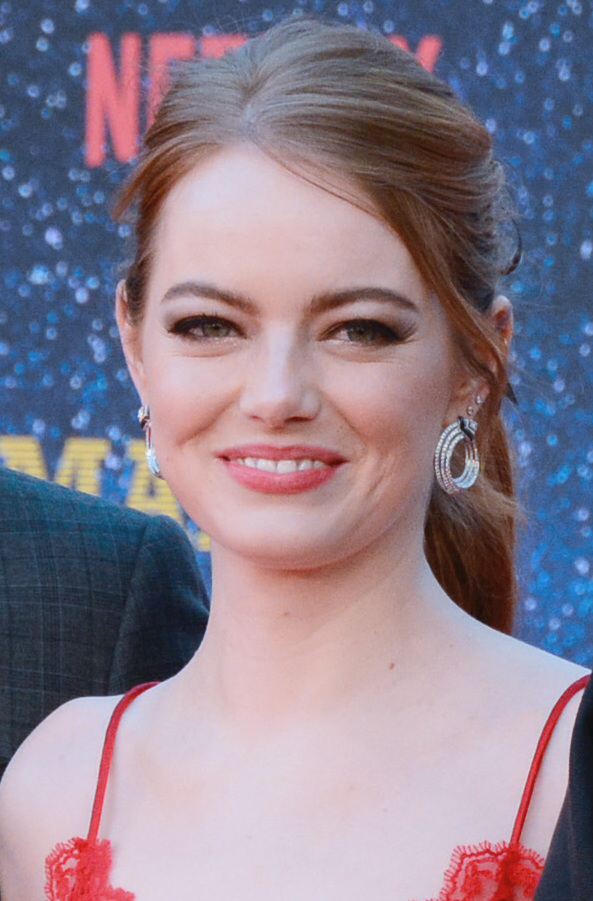
Emma Stone

- Erika Alexander (born 1969) – actress
- Rex Allen (1920–1999) – actor, iconic singing cowboy
- Steve Allen (1921–2000) – comedian, actor, known as the "father of TV talk shows"; first job was in Arizona
- Asher Angel (born 2002) – actor, Shazam!
- Samaire Armstrong (born 1980) – actress, Juliet Darling on Dirty Sexy Money and Anna Stern on The O.C.
- Jules Asner (born 1968) – actress and host of E!'s show Wild On!
- Jaime Lyn Bauer (born 1949) – soap opera actress, played Lauralee Brooks on The Young and the Restless and Laura Spencer Horton on Days of Our Lives
- Sandra Bernhard (born 1955) – actress, comedian; attended high school in Arizona
- Michael Biehn (born 1956) – actor, The Terminator, Tombstone
- Mika Boorem (born 1987) – actress, The Tom Show
- Aidy Bryant (born 1987) – actress, comedian, Saturday Night Live
- Brooke Burke (born 1971) – actress, model, TV personality, Dancing with the Stars
- Lynda Carter (born 1951) – actress and singer, known for Wonder Woman, 1972 Miss World USA
- Joan Ganz Cooney (born 1929) – TV producer of Sesame Street
- Brady Corbet (born 1988) – actor
- J'aime Crandall (born 1982) – ballet dancer
- Matt Dallas (born 1982) – actor, Kyle XY
- Ted Danson (born 1947) – actor, Cheers, CSI
- Rosemary DeCamp (1910–2001) – actress, Yankee Doodle Dandy, The Bob Cummings Show
- Andy Devine (1905–1977) – actor, Stagecoach, The Man Who Shot Liberty Valance
- Charles Dudley (1883–1952) – stage and film actor, studio makeup artist
- Barbara Eden (born 1931) – actress, I Dream of Jeannie
- Gail Edwards (born 1952) – actress, known for her roles in It's a Living, Blossom, and Full House
- Jack Elam (1918–2003) – actor
- Michael Ensign (born 1944) – actor, Boston Legal
- Danielle Fishel (born 1981) – actress, Boy Meets World and Girl Meets World
- Pablo Francisco (born 1974) – stand-up comedian, actor
- Sammi Hanratty (born 1995) – child actress, The Unit, The Suite Life of Zack & Cody
- James Hatley (born 1997) – actor in adult films
- Alexa Havins (born 1980) – actress, All My Children, One Life to Live, Torchwood
- Amelia Heinle (born 1973) – actress, Victoria Newman on The Young and the Restless; also played Mia Saunders on All My Children
- David Henrie (born 1989) – actor, Wizards of Waverly Place, How I Met Your Mother, That's So Raven
- Catherine Hicks (born 1951) – actress, 7th Heaven, Child's Play; attended Gerard Catholic High School
- Earl Hindman (1942–2003) – actor, Ryan's Hope, Home Improvement
- Gregg Hoffman (1963–2005) – film producer
- Michael Horse (born 1951) – artist, actor, Twin Peaks, Passenger 57
- Dominic Janes (born 1994) – teen actor, ER, Out of Jimmy's Head, Dexter
- Brad Johnson (born 1959) – actor, Always, Flight of the Intruder
- Chelsea Kane (born 1988) – actress, singer, Jonas, Fish Hooks
- Tanner Maguire (born 1998) – child actor, Young Shawn Brady on Days of Our Lives
- Leslie Mancia (born 1987) – model, contestant on America’s Next Top Model Cycle 6
- Taryn Manning (born 1978) – actress, fashion designer, singer-songwriter
- Abigail Mavity (born 1993) – actress
- Josh McDermitt (born 1978) – actor, comedian, Dr. Eugene Porter on The Walking Dead
- Rachel Melvin (born 1985) – actress, Chelsea Brady on Days of Our Lives
- Jenny Mollen (born 1979) – actress
- Heather Morris (born 1987) – actress, Brittany Pierce on Glee
- Inde Navarrette (born 2001) - actress, Superman & Lois, Obsession
- Tarah Paige (born 1982) – actress, dancer, gymnast, Make It or Break It
- Mary-Louise Parker (born 1964) – actress, Weeds; graduated from Marcos de Niza High School, Tempe
- Valerie Perrine (born 1943) – actress, Superman, Lenny; attended Camelback High School
- Busy Philipps (born 1979) – actress, Cougar Town, Dawson's Creek, Freaks and Geeks
- Larry Pine (born 1945) – actor
- Greg Proops (born 1959) – actor, comedian
- Jenni Pulos – Jeff Lewis's assistant on Bravo's Flipping Out
- James Rallison (born 1996) – internet personality, animator
- Liz Renay (1926–2007) – actress
- Terry Rhoads (1951–2013) – actor
- Jennifer Rubin (born 1962) – actress, model
- Jayla Rubinelli (born 1984) – model, contestant on America’s Next Top Model Cycle 5
- Kylee Saunders (born 1994) – Japanese-American singer
- Garry Shandling (1949–2016) – actor, comedian, The Larry Sanders Show
- David Spade (born 1964) – actor, comedian, Saturday Night Live, Tommy Boy, Just Shoot Me
- Fay Spain (1932–1983) – actress, The Godfather Part II, Al Capone, God's Little Acre
- Emma Stone (born 1988) – actress, La La Land, The Help, The Amazing Spider-Man
- Shayne Topp (born 1991) – internet personality, comedian, actor, Smosh, The Goldbergs
- Amber Valletta (born 1974) – actress, model
- Janet Varney (born 1976) – actress, On the Lot, The Legend of Korra, Stan Against Evil
- Kate Walsh (born 1967) – actress, Dr. Addison Montgomery on Grey's Anatomy and Private Practice
- Mare Winningham (born 1959) – actress, American Horror Story, St. Elmo's Fire, Georgia
- Scott William Winters (born 1965) – actor, Oz, NYPD Blue
- Shannon Woodward (born 1984) – actress, Westworld, Raising Hope, The Riches
- Nick Young – actor, Friend of the World
- Jason Zumwalt (born 1975) – actor, scriptwriter, voice of Roman in Grand Theft Auto IV

== Government, law, and politics ==
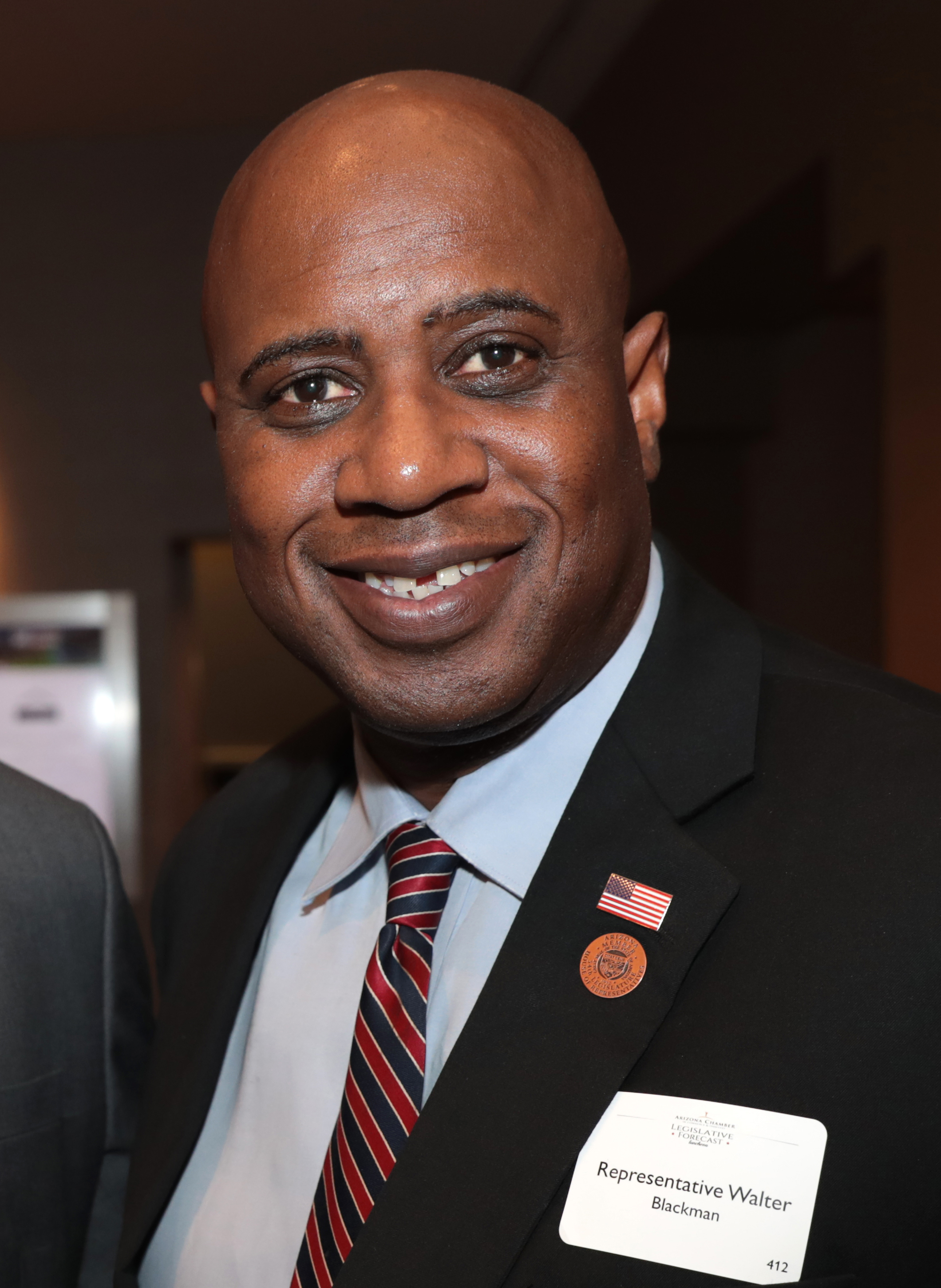
Walter Blackman

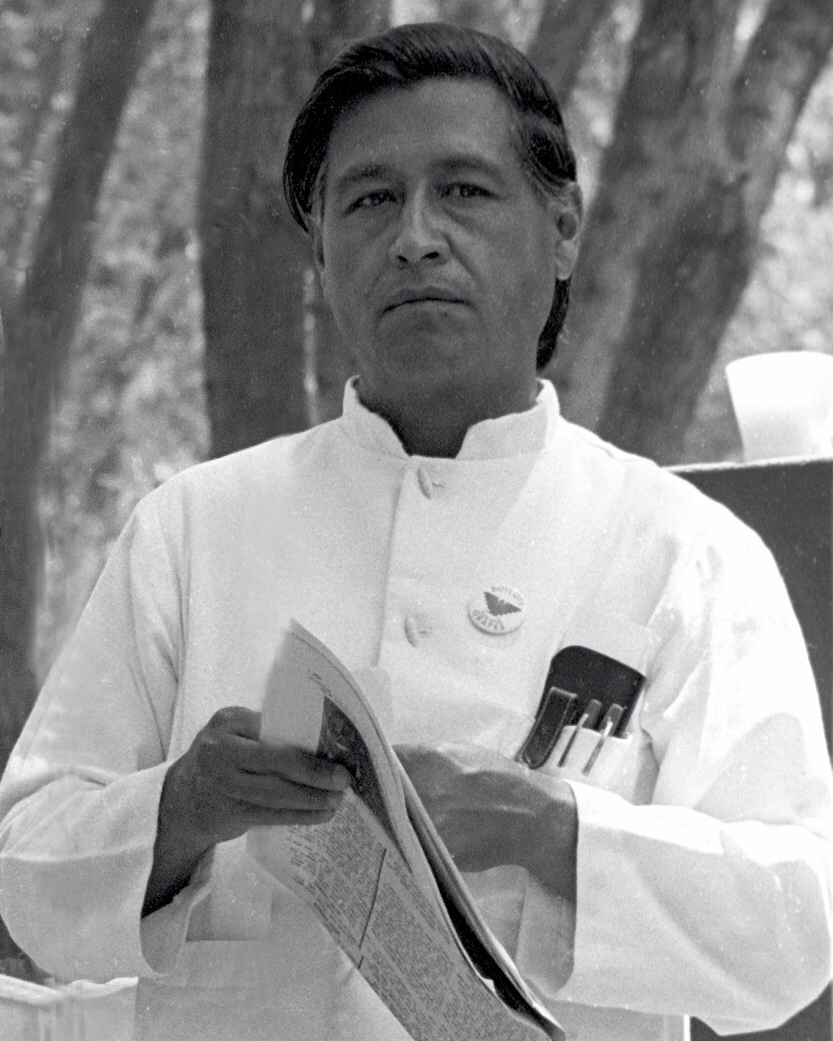
Cesar Chavez

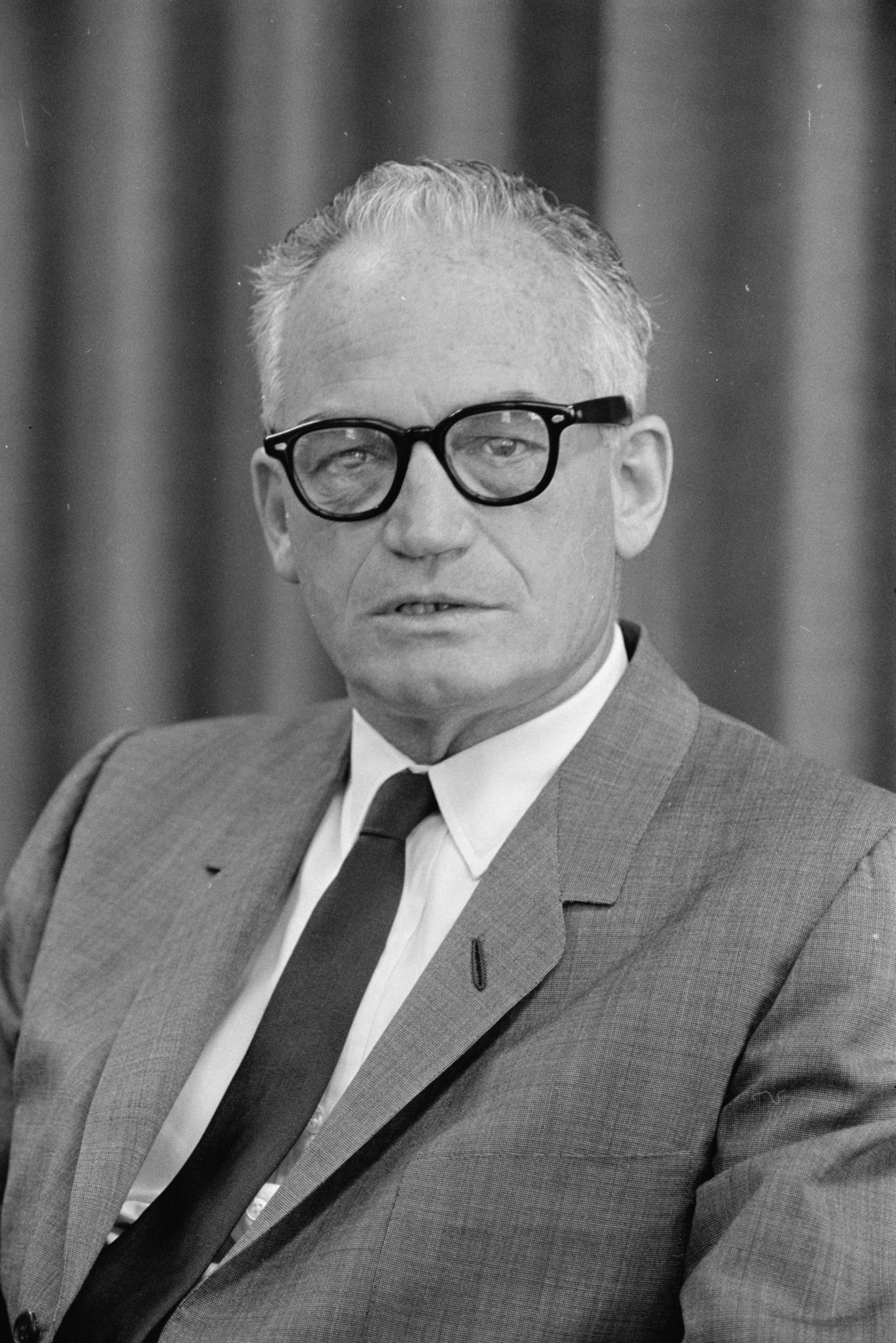
Barry Goldwater

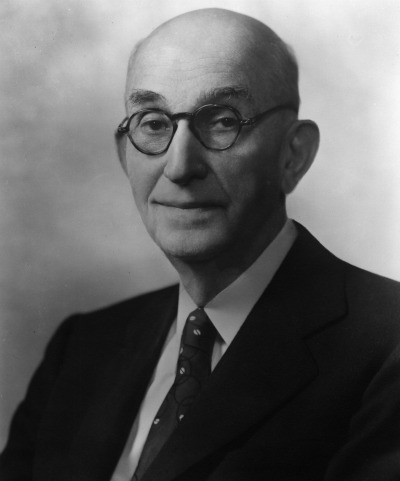
Carl Hayden

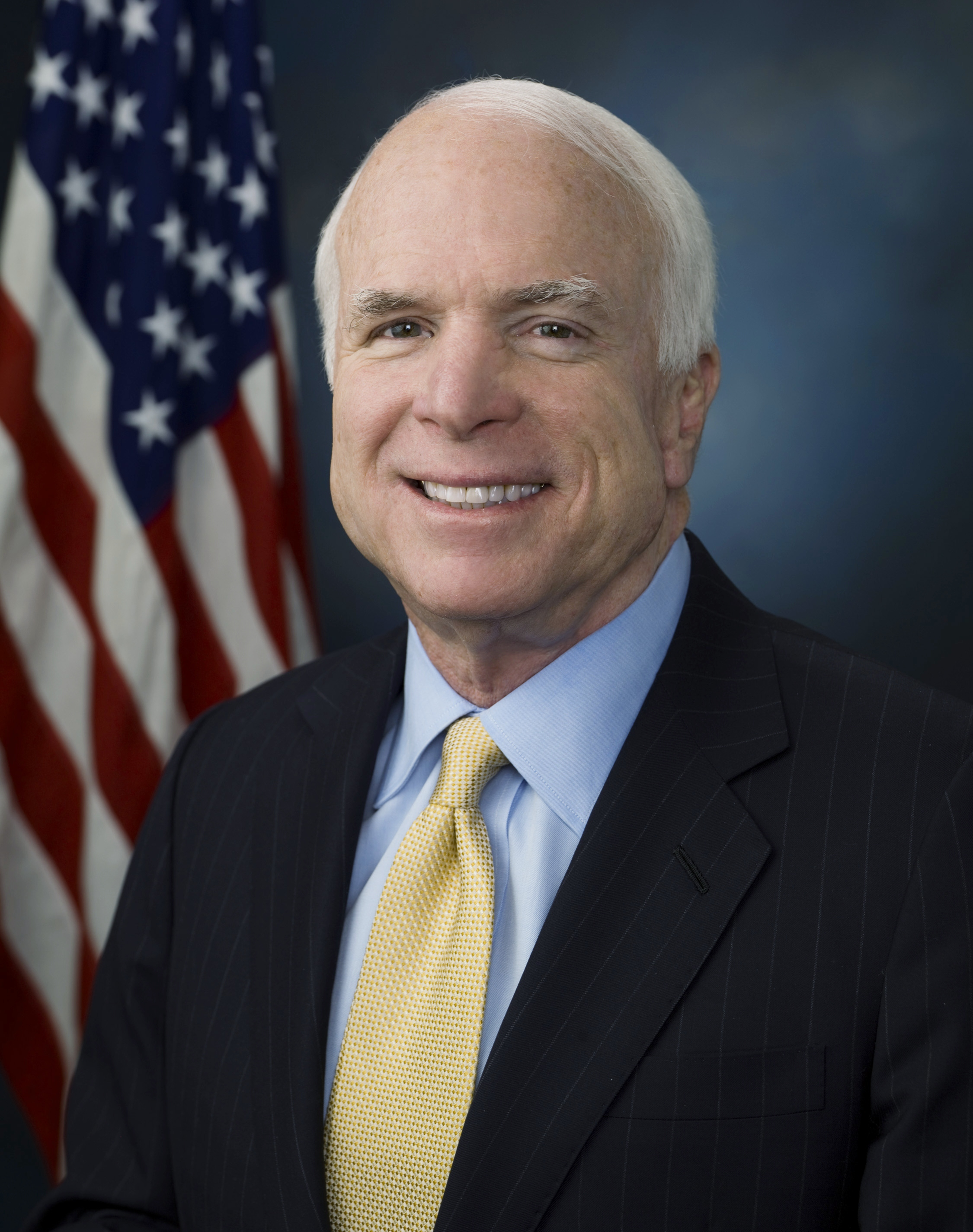
John McCain

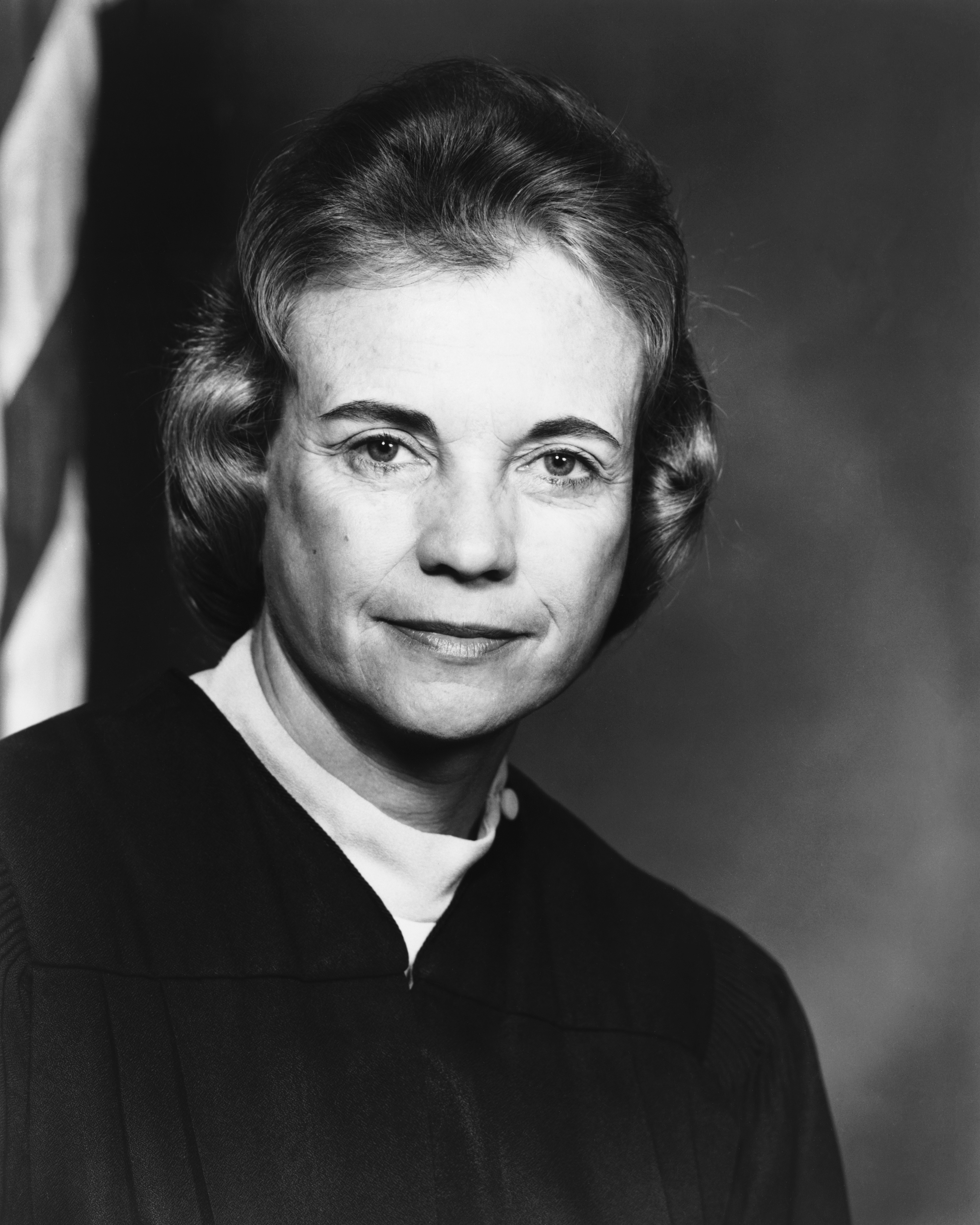
Sandra Day O'Connor

- Thad Allen (born 1949) – retired U.S. Coast Guard admiral; National Incident Commander under President Barack Obama
- John T. Alsap (1830–1886) – first mayor of Phoenix
- Joe Arpaio (born 1932) – former Maricopa County sheriff (1993–2016)
- Henry F. Ashurst (1874–1962) – one of the first U.S. senators from Arizona (1912–1941)
- Bruce Babbitt (born 1938) – former governor of Arizona (1978–1987), and secretary of the interior in the Clinton Administration (1993–2001)
- Harriet C. Babbitt (born 1947) – First Lady of Arizona (1978–1987), U.S. ambassador to the Organization of American States (1993–1997), and deputy administrator of the U.S. Agency for International Development (1997–2001)
- Walter Blackman – Republican member of the Arizona House of Representatives
- Jan Brewer (born 1944) – served as the 22nd governor of Arizona
- William Docker Browning (1931–2008) – federal judge
- Dean Burch – former chairman of the Republican National Committee
- César Chávez (1927–1993) – labor union leader
- Dennis DeConcini (born 1937) – retired U.S. senator (1977–1994)
- Doug Ducey (born 1964) – governor of Arizona (2015–2023)
- Paul Fannin (1907–2002) – former U.S. senator (1965–1977) and governor of Arizona (1959–1965)
- Randy Fine (born 1974) – U.S. congressman and gambling industry executive
- Jeff Flake (born 1962) – Arizona U.S. senator (2013–2019)
- Gabby Giffords (born 1970) – U.S. representative, wounded in the 2011 Tucson shooting
- Barry M. Goldwater (1909–1998) – longtime Arizona senator (1953–1965, 1969–1987), and 1964 Republican nominee for president
- George Nicholas Goodman (1895–1959) – five-time mayor of Mesa in three different decades
- John Noble Goodwin (1824–1887) – first governor of the Arizona Territory (1863–1866)
- Margaret Hance (1923–1990) – first female mayor of Phoenix, 1976–1983
- Carl Hayden (1877–1972) – U.S. senator, holds the record for the longest service in the U.S. congress
- Katie Hobbs (born 1969) – incumbent governor of Arizona since 2019
- Brad Hoylman (born 1965) – New York state senator
- Don Lorenzo Hubbell – Arizona state senator
- John C. Keegan – judge, legislator, mayor of Peoria
- Lisa Graham Keegan – legislator, superintendent of Public Instruction
- Denison Kitchel (1908–2002) – Scottsdale lawyer and the Goldwater presidential national campaign manager in 1964
- Jon Kyl (1942–2026) – U.S. senator (1995–2013; 2018)
- Fiorello La Guardia – mayor of New York City
- Rex E. Lee (1935–1996) – United States solicitor general during the Reagan Administration
- John McCain (1936–2018) – Panamanian-born politician, longtime U.S. senator from Arizona from 1986 until his death, former navy officer, and 2008 Republican nominee for president
- Ernest McFarland (1894–1984) – former U.S. senator (1941–1953) and governor of Arizona (1955–1959)
- Rose Mofford (1922–2016) – first female governor of Arizona, 1988–1991
- Janet Napolitano (born 1957) – 21st governor of Arizona
- Sandra Day O'Connor (1930–2023) – first female justice of the United States Supreme Court
- Mary Peters (born 1948) – United States Secretary of Transportation under President George W. Bush
- Ben Quayle (born 1976) – former U.S. congressman
- Dan Quayle (born 1947) – former U.S. senator from Indiana (1981–1989), and 44th vice president of the United States under George H. W. Bush
- William Rehnquist (1924–2005) – chief justice of the Supreme Court
- Stephen Richer – Maricopa County recorder
- Charles S. Robb (born 1939) – former governor of Virginia (1982–1986) and U.S. senator from Virginia (1989–2001)
- John Shadegg (born 1949) – former U.S. representative from Phoenix
- Stephen Shadegg (1909–1990) – political consultant associated with Barry Goldwater
- Marcus A. Smith (1851–1924) – one of the first two senators from Arizona
- John G.F. Speiden (1900–1970) – rancher and political insider, various state boards
- Jack Taylor – mayor of Mesa, 1966–1972; member of both houses, consecutively, of the Arizona legislature
- David King Udall – Arizona Territorial Legislature
- Don Taylor Udall – Arizona State Legislature
- Jesse Addison Udall – chief justice of the Arizona Supreme Court
- John Hunt Udall – mayor of Phoenix
- Levi Stewart Udall – chief justice of the Arizona Supreme Court
- Mark Udall – senator from Colorado
- Morris "Mo" Udall (1922–1998) – U.S. congressman and former pro basketball player
- Nick Udall – mayor of Phoenix
- Stewart Udall (1920–2010) – U.S. congressman and secretary of the interior during the JFK and LBJ administrations

== Journalism and media ==
- Noah Beck (born 2001) – social media personality
- Rachel Campos-Duffy (born 1971) – TV personality, The Real World: San Francisco, The View
- Cheryl Casone (born 1970) – anchor for the Fox Business Network and business correspondent for Fox News
- John Garcia – National Geographic Channel's DogTown series star, Guinness World Record holder
- Hadas Gold (born 1988) – media and business reporter
- Savannah Guthrie (born 1971) – White House correspondent for NBC News, co-host of NBC's Today Show
- Dan Hicks (born 1962) – sportscaster for NBC
- Pat Hughes (born 1955) – play-by-play voice of the Chicago Cubs for WGN radio
- Don Imus (1940–2019) – nationally syndicated talk radio host, Imus in the Morning
- Meghan McCain (born 1984) – co-host of The View

== Military ==
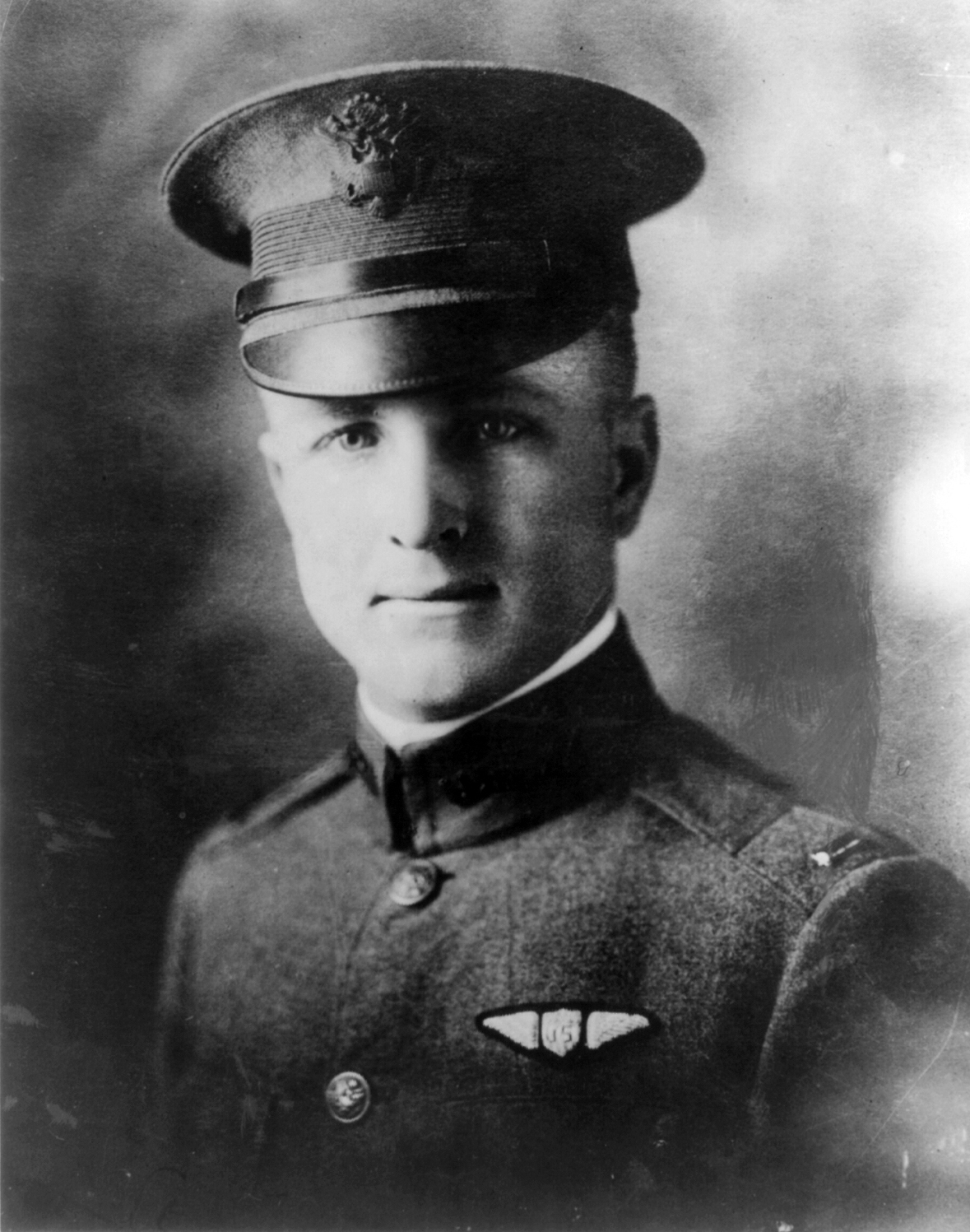
Frank Luke

- John Dean "Jeff" Cooper (1920–2006) – World War II United States Marine Corps officer and firearms training innovator
- Timothy Creamer (born 1959) – U.S. Army colonel, NASA astronaut
- Joe Foss (1915–2003) – leading United States Marine Corps fighter ace and Medal of Honor recipient
- Ira Hayes (1923–1955) – United States Marine Corps, World War II, helped raise United States flag during the Battle of Iwo Jima
- Frank Luke (1897–1918) – World War I fighter pilot, Medal of Honor recipient
- Lori Piestewa (1979–2003) – United States Army, first Native American woman from Arizona to be killed in war; Iraq War, Purple Heart and Prisoner of War Medal recipient
- Pat Tillman (1976–2004) – United States Army; Afghanistan Silver Star recipient; Arizona State and NFL football player.

== Music ==
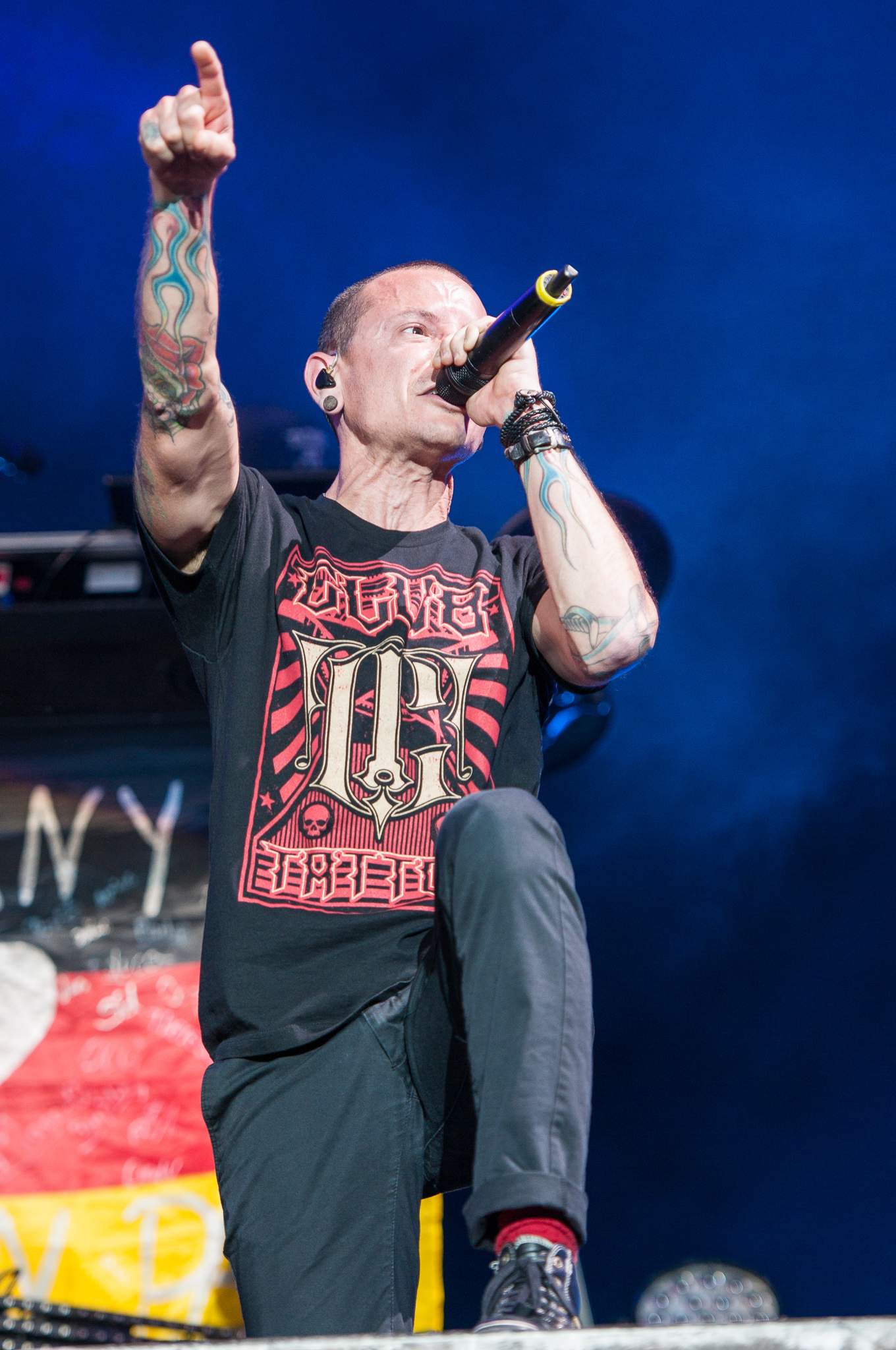
Chester Bennington

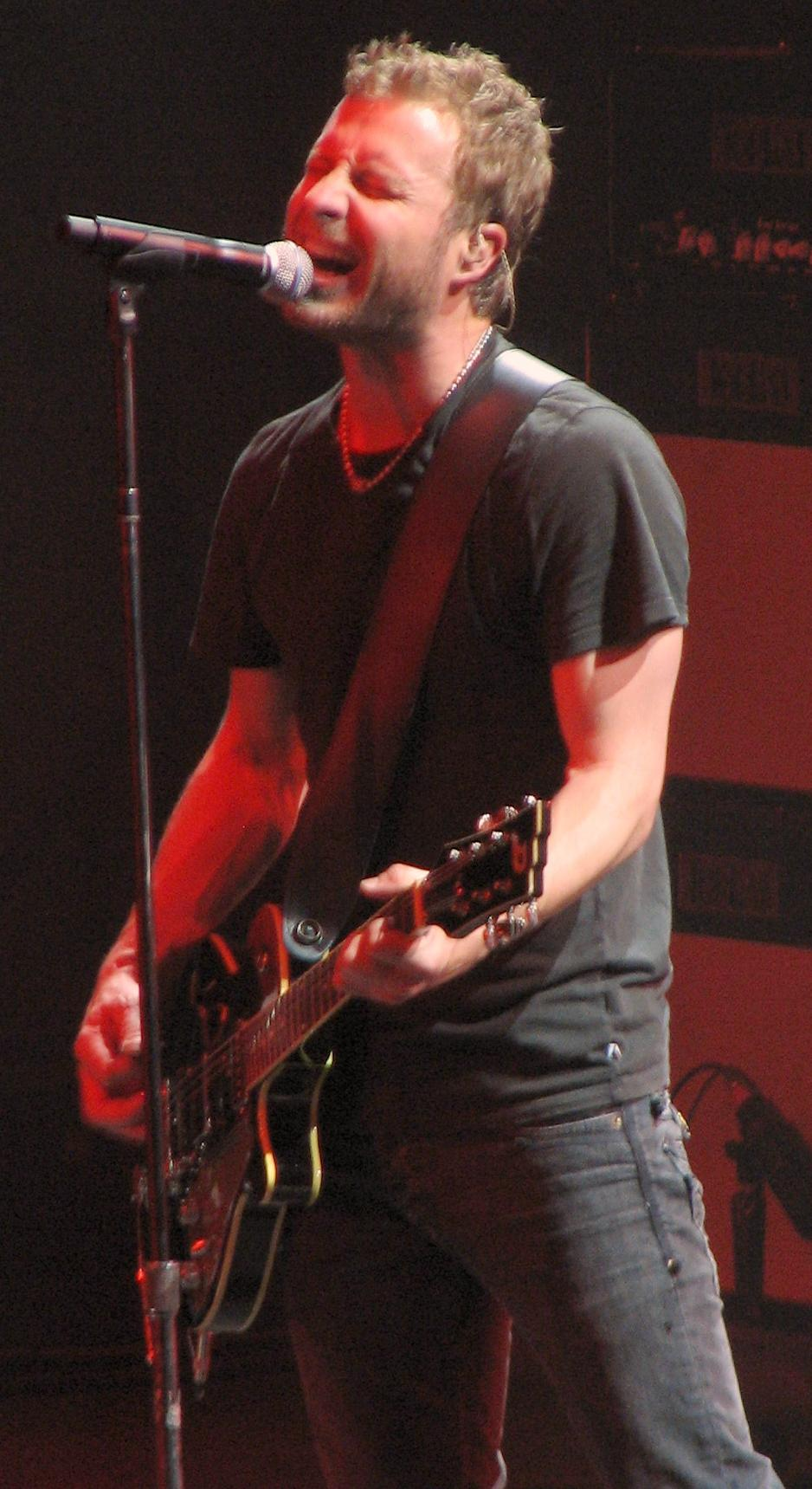
Dierks Bentley

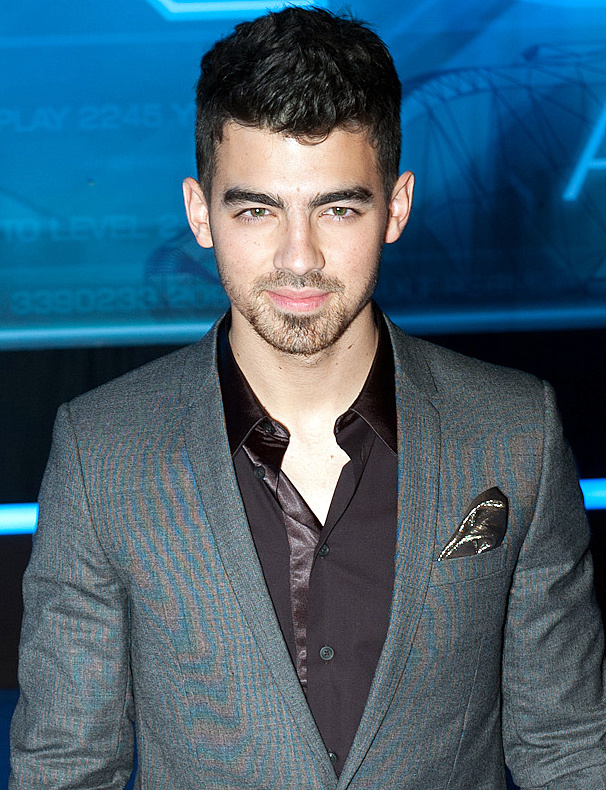
Joe Jonas

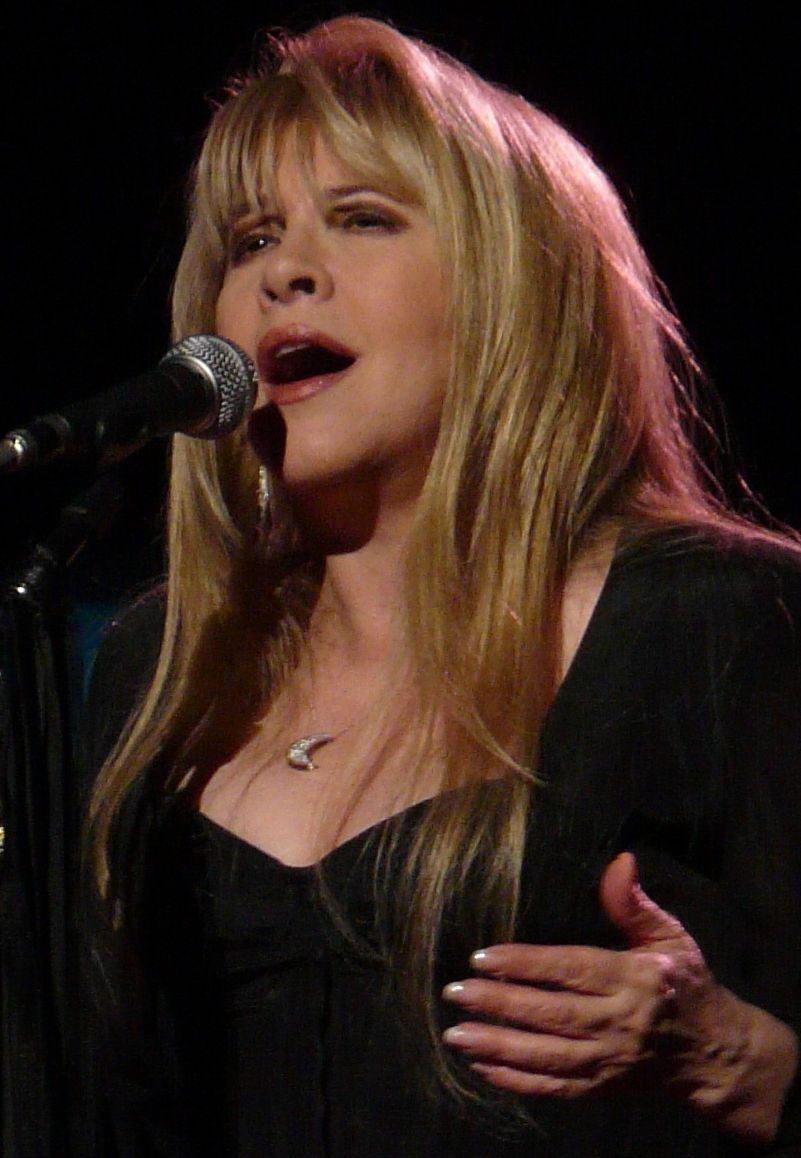
Stevie Nicks

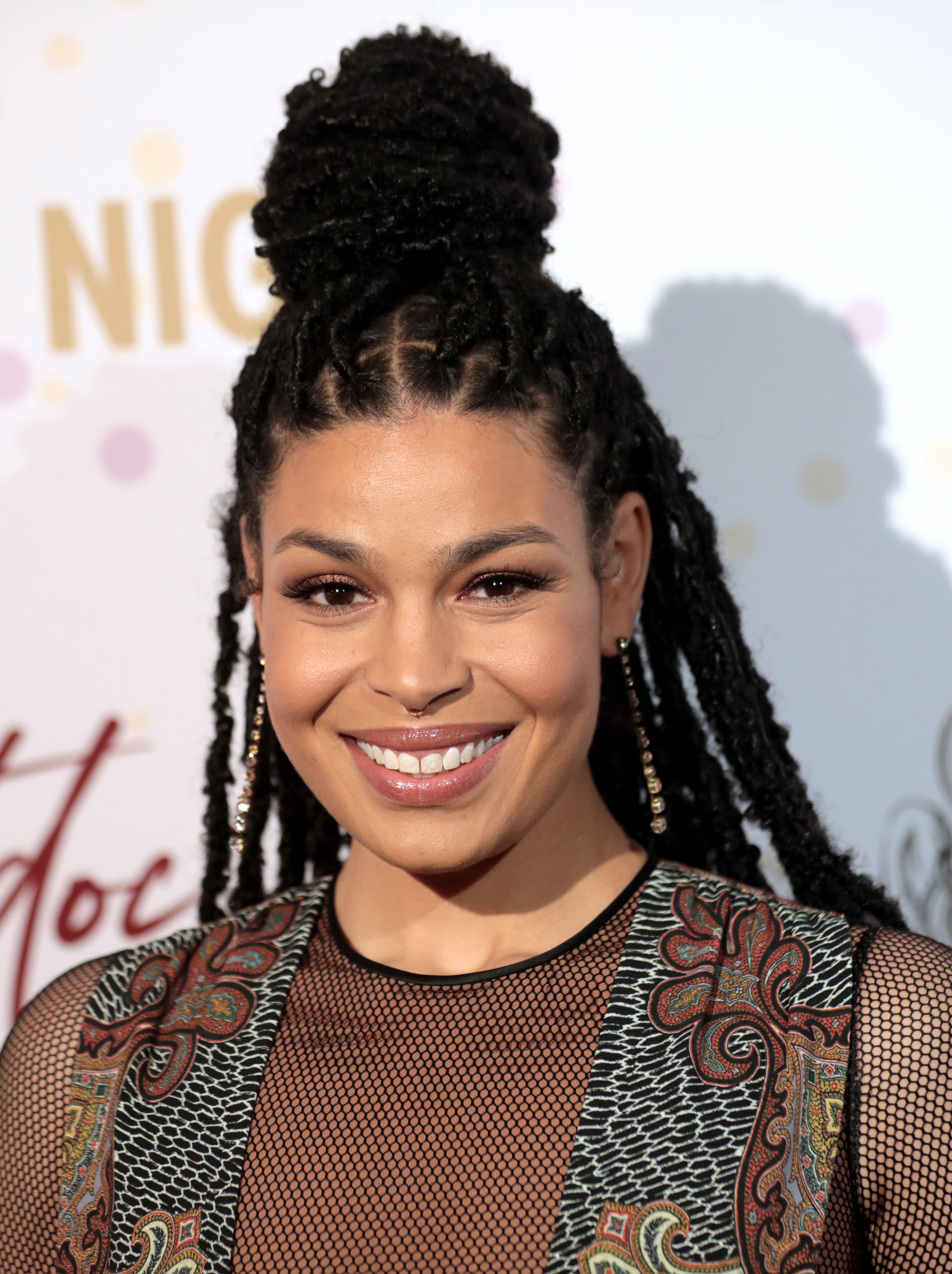
Jordin Sparks

- Jim Adkins (born 1975) – lead singer and guitarist for the band Jimmy Eat World
- Rex Allen (1920–1999) – singer-songwriter, actor, known as "The Arizona Cowboy"
- Alec Benjamin (born 1994) – pop singer
- Chester Bennington (1976–2017) – lead singer for the band Linkin Park
- Dierks Bentley (born 1975) – country singer (Phoenix)
- Derrick Bostrom (born 1960) – Meat Puppets drummer
- Jess Bowen (born 1989) – alternative rock musician, drummer of The Summer Set
- Michelle Branch (born 1983) – singer-songwriter, guitarist
- Kennedy Brock (born 1989) – alternative rock musician, guitarist of The Maine
- Glen Campbell (1936–2017) – singer, musician and actor; inductee to Country Music Hall of Fame
- Max Cavalera (born 1969) – vocalist and guitarist (Sepultura, Soulfly, Cavalera conspiracy)
- Roger Clyne (born 1968) – rock musician; lead singer for Refreshments and RCPM
- Alice Cooper (born 1948) – rock and roll singer
- Brian Dales (born 1989) – alternative rock musician, lead singer of The Summer Set
- Duane Eddy (born 1938) – guitarist, inductee of Rock and Roll Hall of Fame
- Linda Eder (born 1961) – singer, Broadway star and recording artist
- Travis Edmonson (1932–2009) – singer-songwriter, part of folk duo Bud & Travis
- David Ellefson (born 1964) – bass guitar player and co-founder of the metal band Megadeth
- Dolan Ellis (born 1935) – singer-songwriter, official State Balladeer since 1966, original member of New Christy Minstrels
- Esteban (born 1948) – musician
- Frank Fafara – early 1960s pop singer, TV star of Wallace & Ladmo Show
- Steve George (born 1955) – of the group Mr. Mister
- John Gomez (born 1991) – alternative rock musician, guitarist of The Summer Set
- Stephen Gomez (born 1988) – alternative rock musician, bassist of The Summer Set
- Lalo Guerrero (1916–2005) – singer-songwriter, known as the "father of Chicano music"; recipient of the National Medal of Arts
- Evan Honer – country musician
- Injury Reserve – alternative and experimental rap group consisting of producer Parker Corey and rappers Nathaniel Ritchie and Jordan Groggs (1988–2020)
- Waylon Jennings (1937–2002) – singer; inductee to Country Music Hall of Fame
- Joe Jonas (born 1989) – member of the Jonas Brothers and lead singer of the pop-rock band DNCE
- Daniel Jones – guitarist and vocalist with 7th Order
- Maynard James Keenan (born 1964) – actor, frontman for Tool, A Perfect Circle, and Puscifer
- Brandon Kellum (born 1985) – frontman for American Standards
- Patrick Kirch (born 1990) – alternative rock musician, drummer of The Maine
- Cris Kirkwood (born 1960) – guitar and vocals for the Meat Puppets
- Katie Lee (1919–2017) – folk singer
- Craig Mabbitt (born 1987) – frontman for Blessthefall (2003–2008), The Word Alive (2008), and Escape the Fate (2008–present)
- Charles Mingus (1922–1979) – jazz bassist, composer and bandleader
- Josh Montgomery (born 1988) – alternative rock musician, guitarist of The Summer Set
- Dave Mustaine (born 1961) – frontman and founder of the metal band Megadeth
- Jason Newsted (born 1963) – former bassist of heavy metal band Metallica
- Wayne Newton (born 1942) – singer, known as "Mr. Las Vegas"
- Stevie Nicks (born 1948) – Grammy-winning singer-songwriter, known for solo work and as lead singer with Fleetwood Mac
- Hans Olson (born 1952) – musician, singer and songwriter; inducted into the Arizona Blues Hall of Fame
- Buck Owens (1929–2006) – country singer and musician; inductee to the Country Music Hall of Fame (Mesa)
- Richard Page (born 1953) – of the group Mr. Mister
- CeCe Peniston (born 1969) – pop singer
- Marty Robbins (1925–1982) – country music singer
- Linda Ronstadt (born 1946) – singer-songwriter, 2014 Rock and Roll Hall of Fame inductee
- Nate Ruess (born 1982) – lead singer of Fun. and The Format
- Alvie Self – 1960s musician and singer
- Bob Shane (1934–2020) – singer, founding member of The Kingston Trio
- Jordin Sparks (born 1989) – singer, winner of American Idol Season 6
- Chris Squire (1948–2015) – bass player and founding member of progressive rock group Yes
- Tanya Tucker (born 1958) – country singer
- Upsahl (born 1998) – indie pop singer
- Brooke White (born 1983) – indie pop, folk-pop singer

== Old West era ==
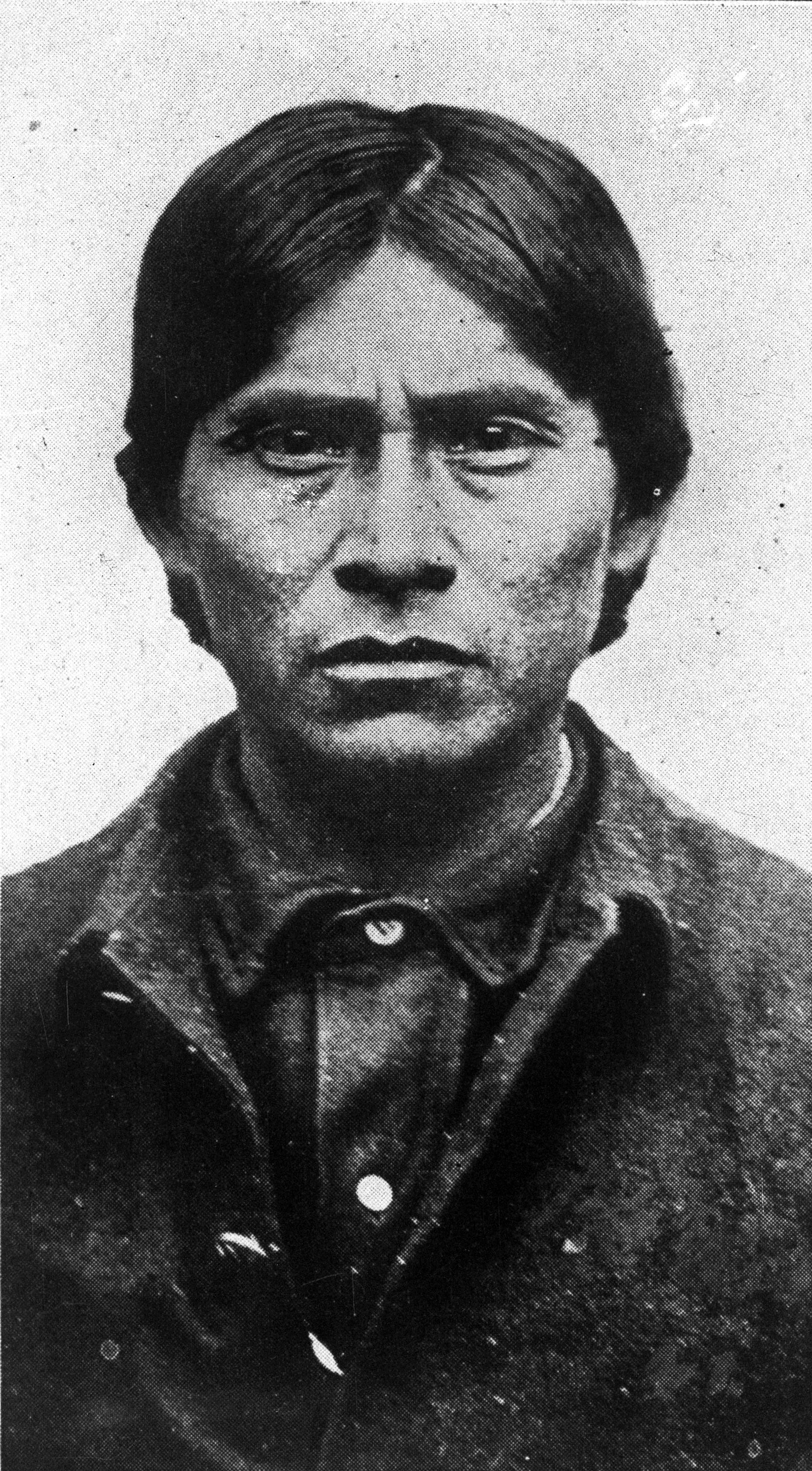
Apache Kid

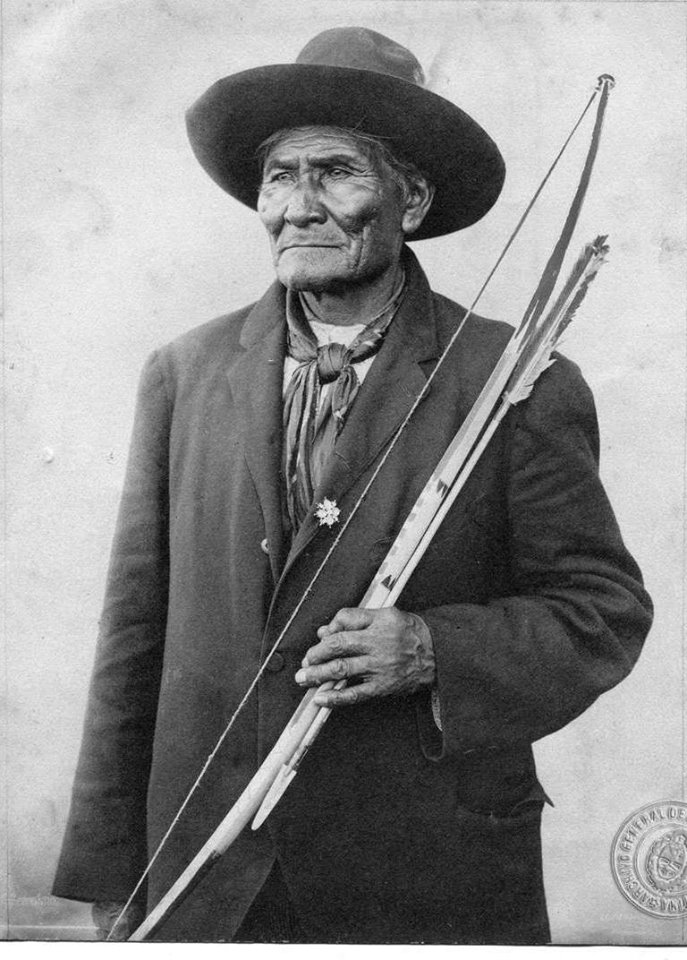
Geronimo

- Apache Kid (1860–1896?) – outlaw, reported killer of three Arizona lawmen 1889–1890
- Billy the Kid (1859–1881) – outlaw
- William Brocius (1845–1882) – gunman, rustler, outlaw Cowboy
- Cochise (1812–1874) – chief of the Chiricahua Apache
- Virgil Earp (1843–1905) – lawman
- Wyatt Earp (1848–1929) – lawman
- C. S. Fly (1849–1901) – photographer
- Geronimo (1829–1909) – leader of Chiricahua Apache who fought against encroachment of European settlers on Native American lands; hero of Native American fight for respect and independence
- Pearl Hart (1871–1955) – outlaw
- Doc Holliday (1851–1887) – gambler, gunfighter, dentist
- Irataba (1814–1874) – leader of the Mohave Nation
- Imogen LaChance (1853–1938) – social reformer
- Bat Masterson (1853–1921) – lawman, gambler, journalist
- Sherman McMaster (1853–1892) – outlaw turned lawman, involved in Earp Vendetta Ride
- James Reavis (1843–1914) – self-styled "Baron of Arizona", claimed to have owned much of Arizona
- Johnny Ringo (1850–1882) – outlaw
- John Horton Slaughter (1841–1922) – lawman, cowboy, poker player, rancher
- Billy Stiles (1871–1908) – outlaw

== Sportspeople ==
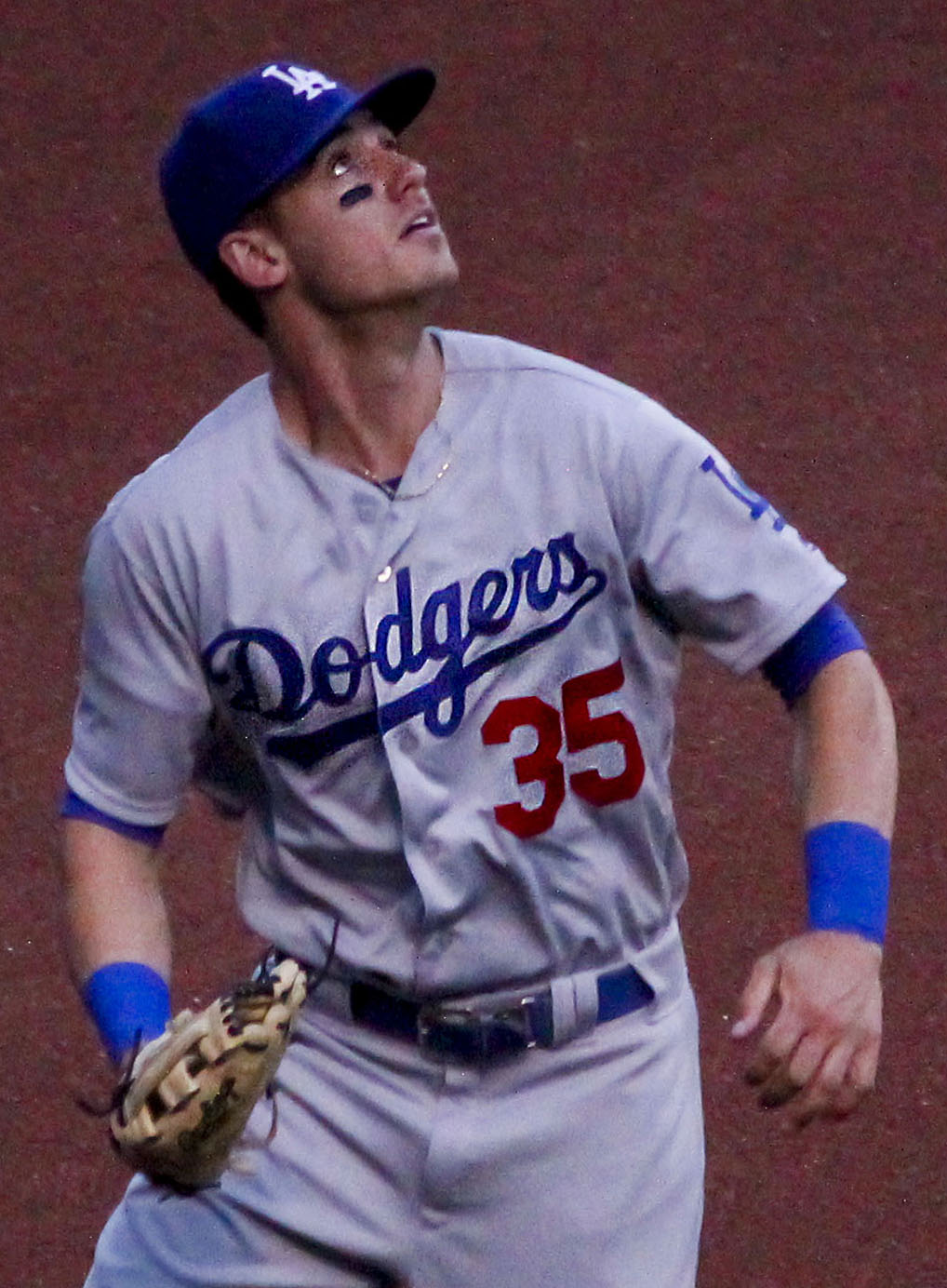
Cody Bellinger

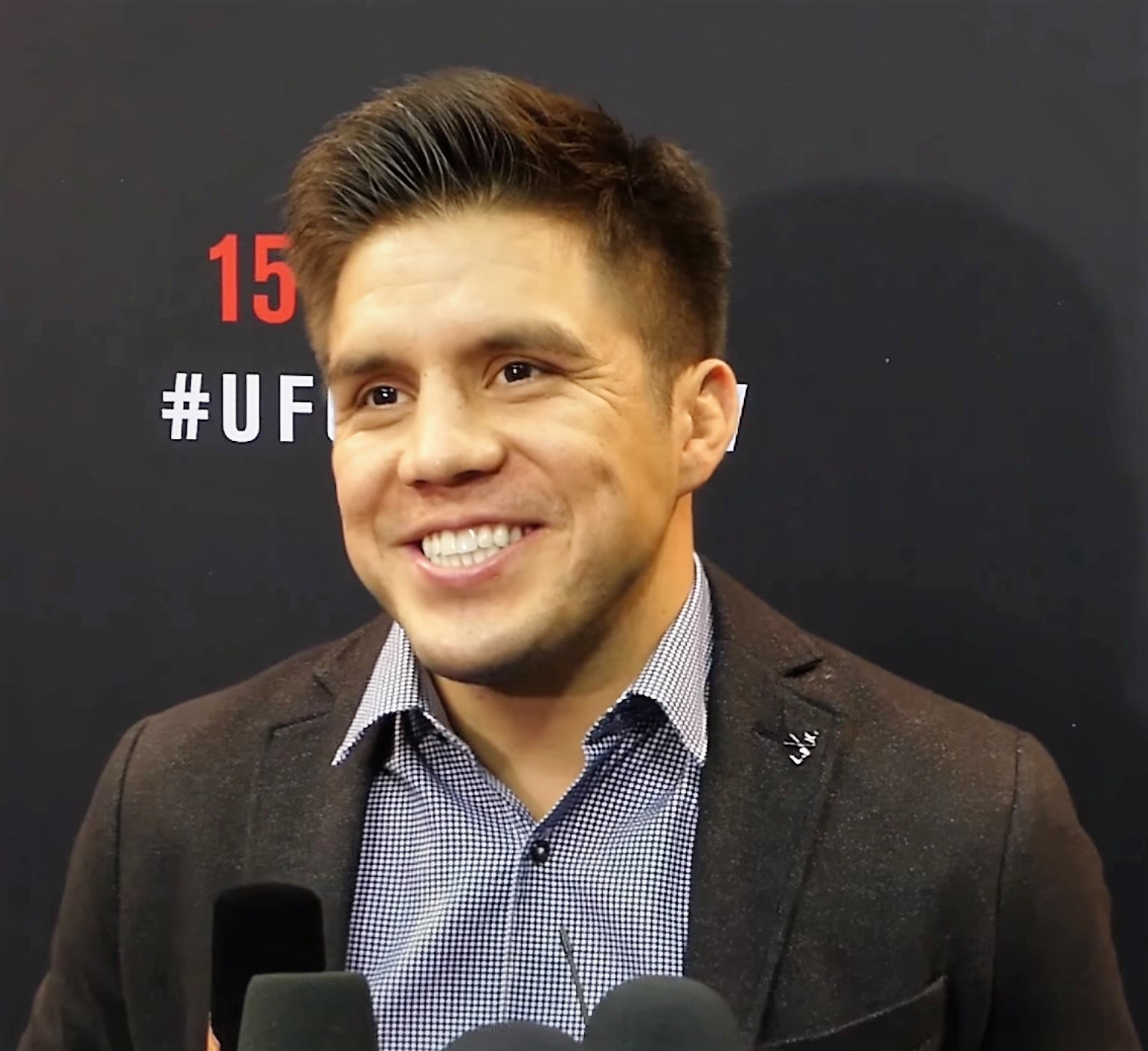
Henry Cejudo

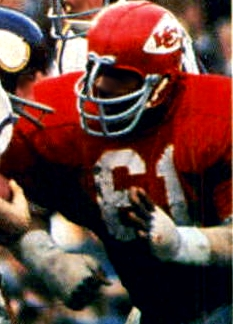
Curley Culp

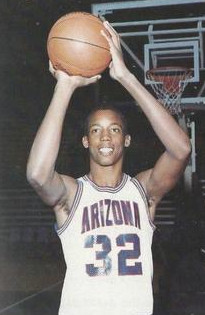
Sean Elliott

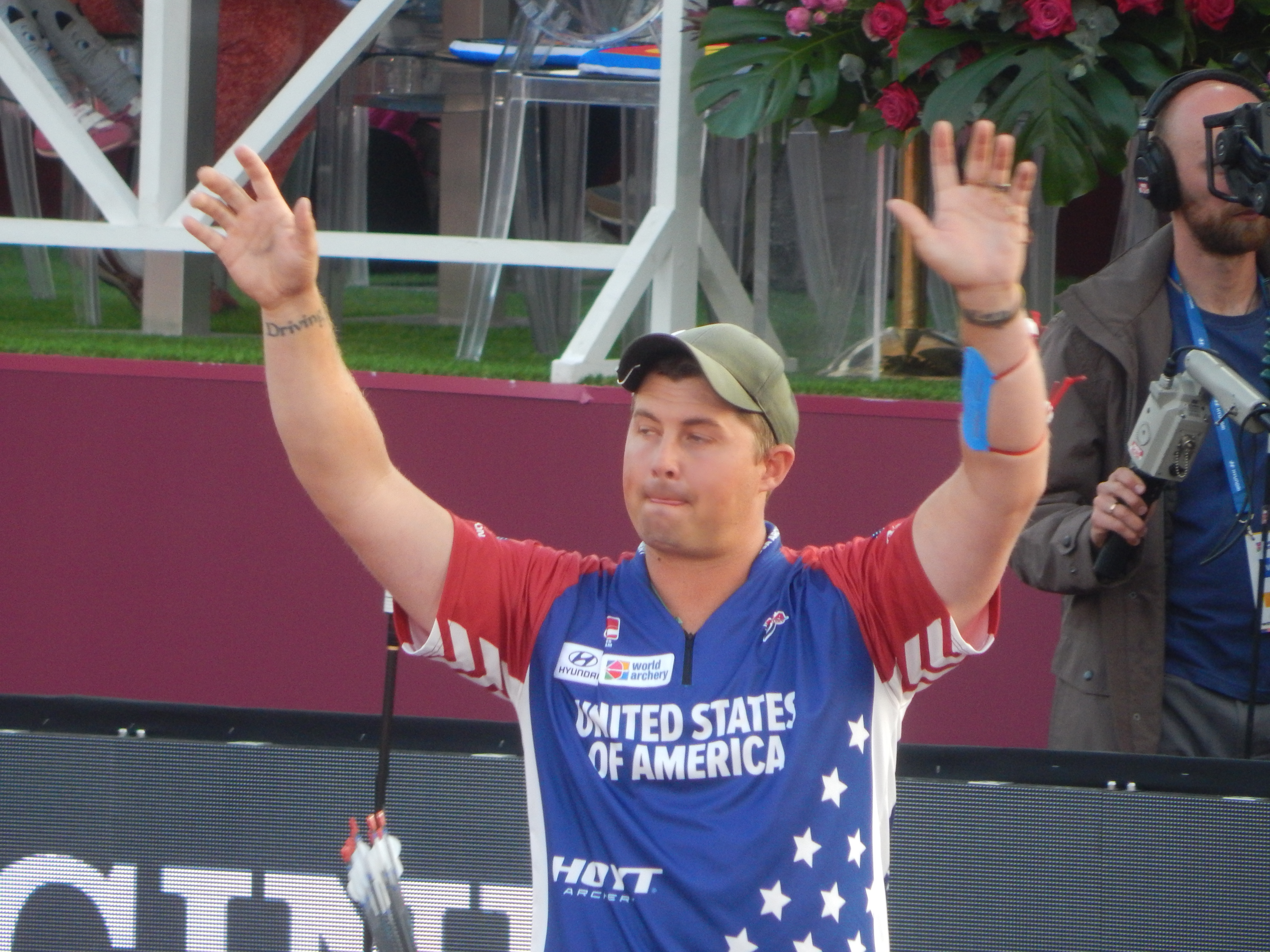
Brady Ellison

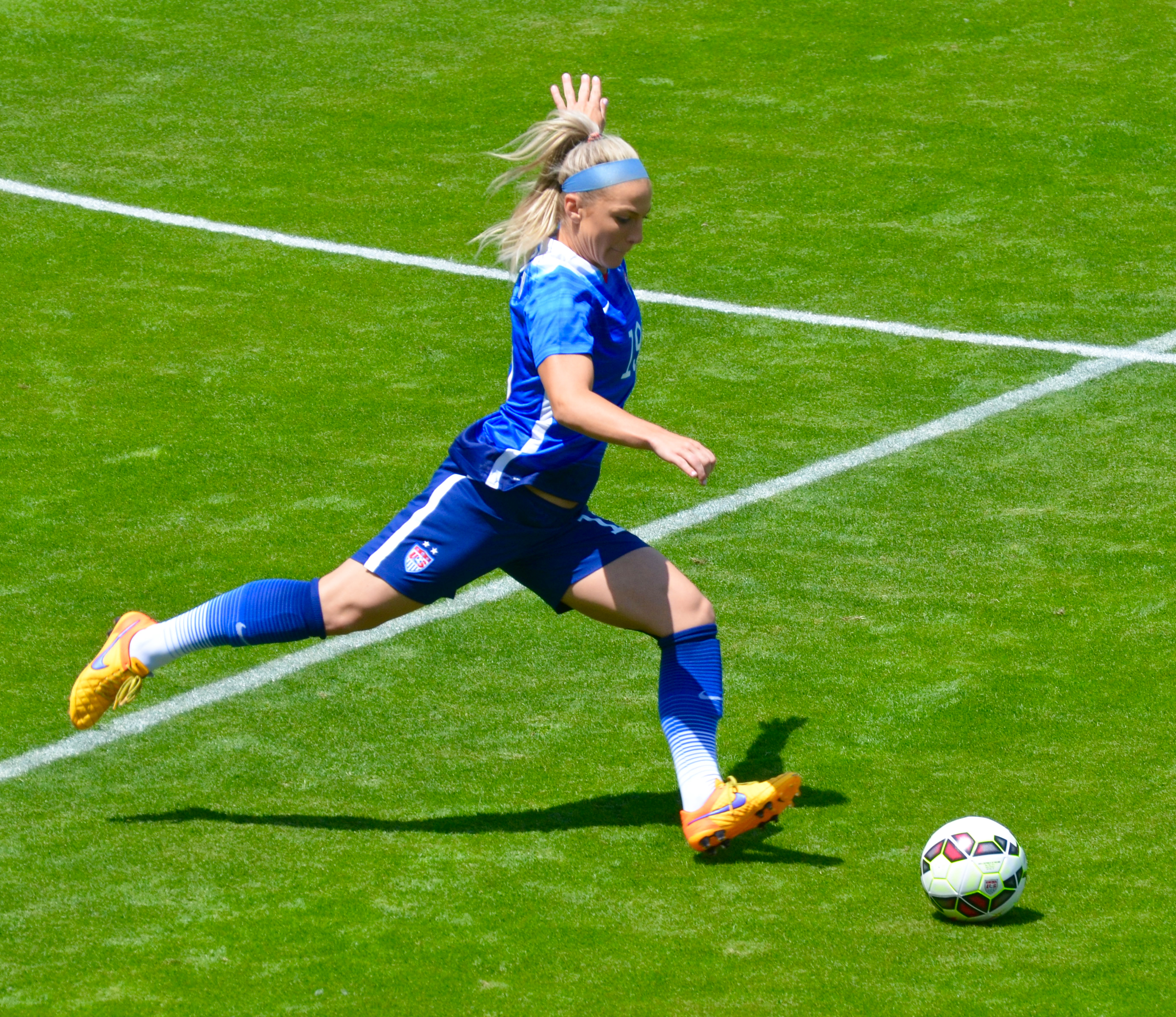
Julie Ertz

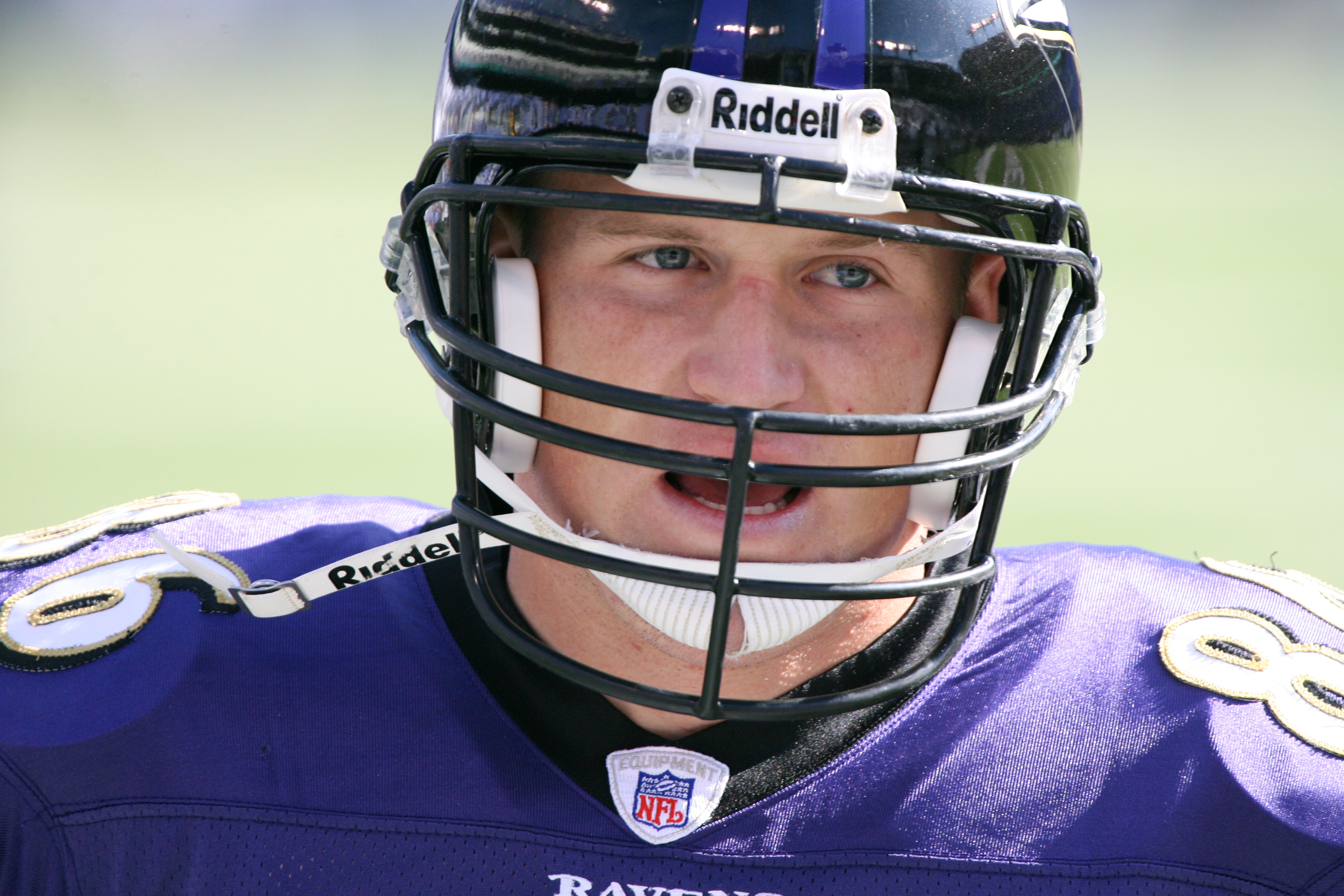
Todd Heap

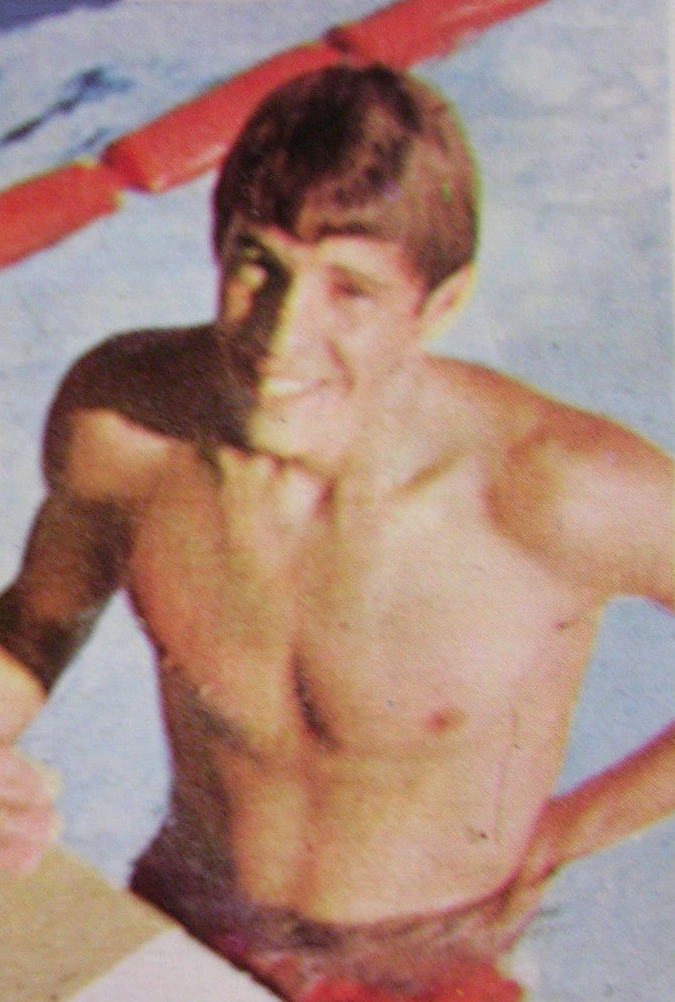
Charlie Hickcox

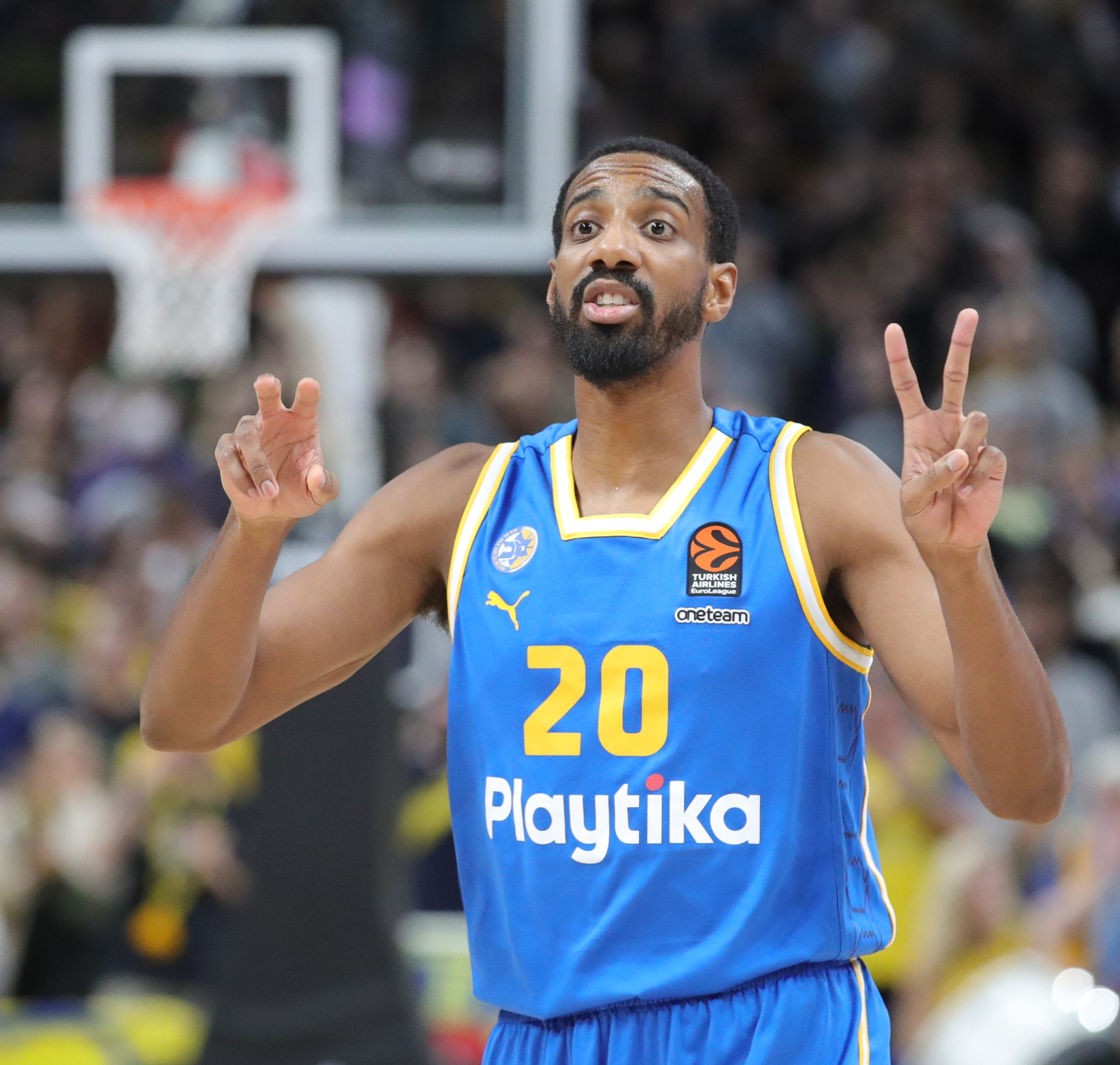
Austin Hollins

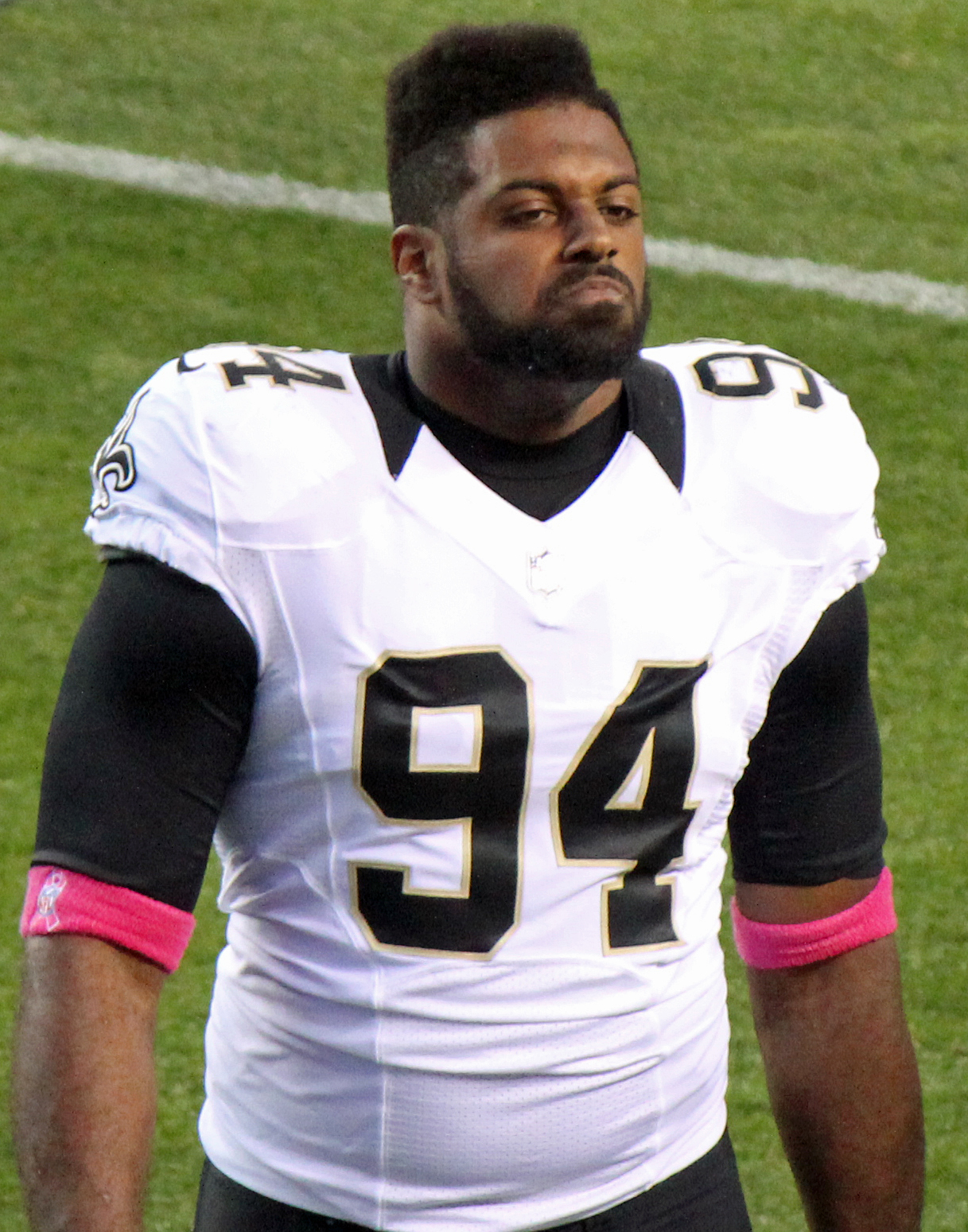
Cam Jordan

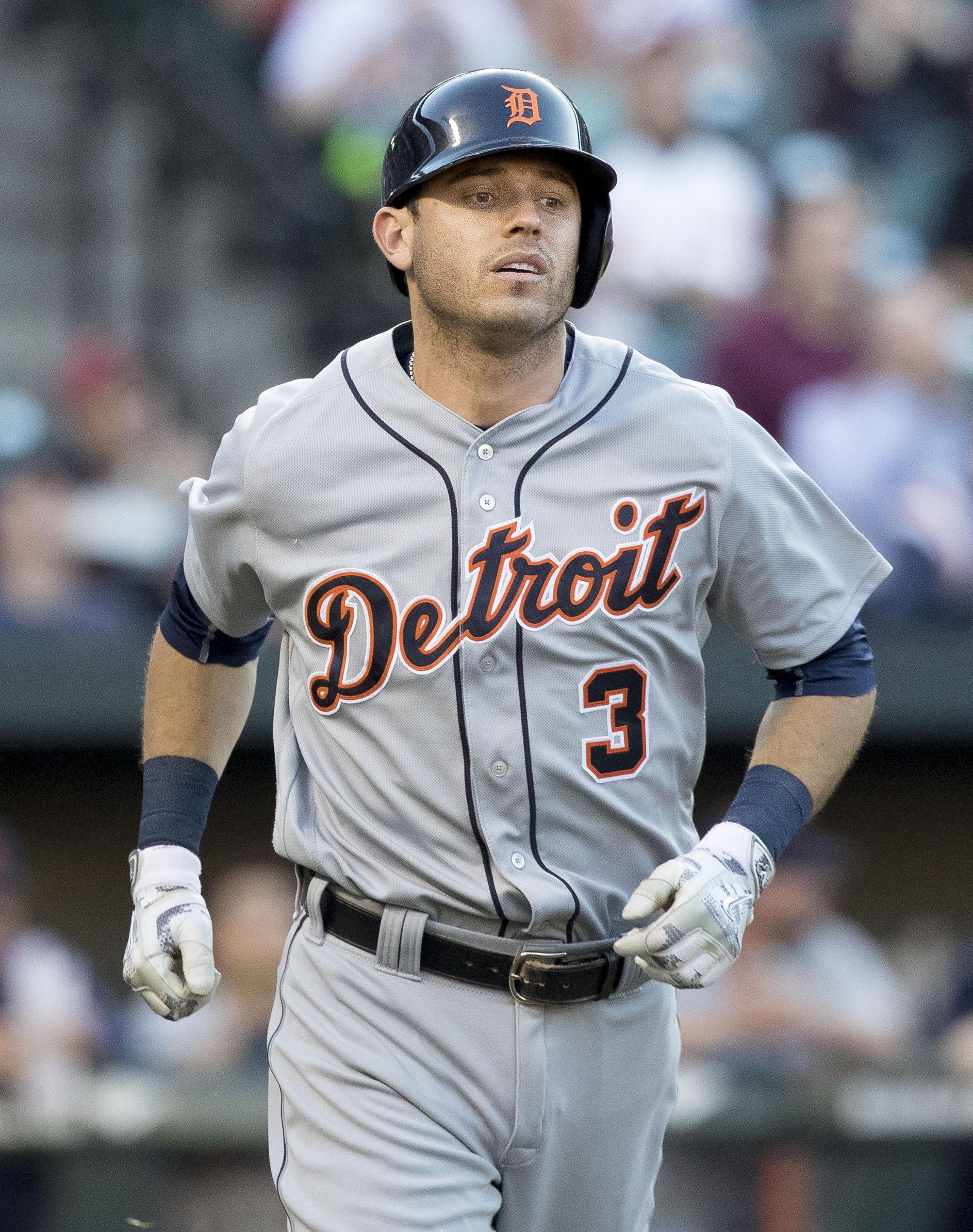
Ian Kinsler

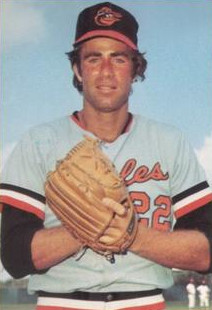
Jim Palmer

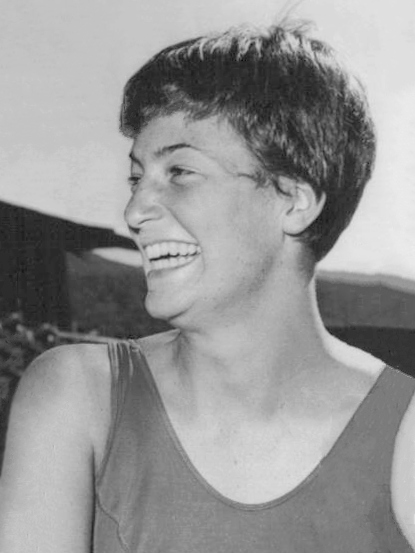
Marilyn Ramenofsky

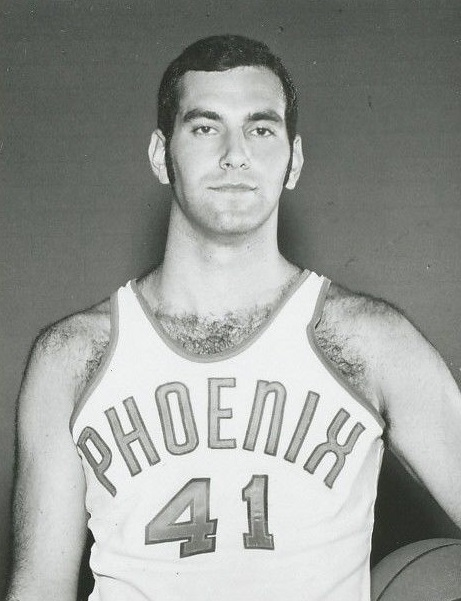
Neal Walk

- Max Aaron (born 1992) – 2013 U.S. national champion figure skater
- Chance Adams (born 1994) – starting pitcher for the New York Yankees
- Jeremy Affeldt (born 1979) – relief pitcher for the San Francisco Giants
- Erik Affholter (born 1966) – NFL wide receiver
- Kyle Allen (born 1996) – NFL quarterback
- Prince Amukamara (born 1989) – cornerback for the New York Giants
- Brian Anderson (born 1982) – outfielder for the Kansas City Royals
- Mark Andrews (born 1996) – NFL tight end
- Jake Bailey (born 1997) – punter for the New England Patriots
- Dave Baldwin (born 1938) – Major League Baseball player
- Brian Bannister (born 1981) – starting pitcher for the Kansas City Royals
- Jake Barrett (born 1991) – relief pitcher for the Arizona Diamondbacks
- Danny Batten (born 1987) – linebacker for the Buffalo Bills
- Jerryd Bayless (born 1988) – player for the Toronto Raptors
- John Beck (born 1981) – quarterback for the Washington Redskins
- Rich Beem (born 1970) – professional golfer
- Charlie Beljan (born 1984) – professional golfer
- Mike Bell (born 1983) – running back for the New Orleans Saints
- Cody Bellinger (born 1995) – first baseman and outfielder for the Los Angeles Dodgers, Chicago Cubs
- Mike Bibby (born 1978) – retired NBA point guard
- Hunter Bishop (born 1998) – baseball player
- Eddie Bonine (born 1981) – relief pitcher for the Detroit Tigers
- Alex Bowman (born 1993) – NASCAR driver
- Dallas Braden (born 1983) – starting pitcher for the Oakland A's
- Debbie Bramwell-Washington (born 1966) – IFBB professional bodybuilder
- Brian Broderick (born 1986) – pitcher for the Sugar Land Skeeters
- Keith Brown (born 1964) – pitcher for the Cincinnati Reds
- Mike Budenholzer (born 1964) – head coach for the Atlanta Hawks
- Kole Calhoun (born 1987) – outfielder for the Los Angeles Angels
- Michael Carbajal (born 1967) – boxing champion
- Ka'Deem Carey (born 1992) – running back for the Chicago Bears
- D. J. Carrasco (born 1977) – MLB pitcher
- Henry Cejudo (born 1987) – 2008 Beijing Olympics gold medal winner in wrestling, UFC Flyweight Champion and Bantamweight Champion
- Steve Colter (born 1962) – retired NBA point guard
- Manuel Contreras (born 1993) – left fielder for the Arizona Diamondbacks
- Bryce Cotton (born 1992) – point guard for the San Antonio Spurs
- C. J. Cron (born 1990) – first baseman and designated hitter for the Minnesota Twins
- Curley Culp (1946–2021) – NFL defensive lineman, member of the Pro Football Hall of Fame
- Billy Cundiff (born 1980) – placekicker for the Baltimore Ravens
- Chad Curtis (born 1968) – MLB outfielder
- Ike Davis (born 1987) – first baseman for the Oakland A's
- Khris Davis (born 1987) – left fielder for the Oakland A's
- Tyeler Davison (born 1992) – defensive tackle for the New Orleans Saints
- Chris DeGeare (born 1987) – offensive guard for the Minnesota Vikings
- Na'il Diggs (born 1978) – retired NFL linebacker
- Chris Duncan (1981–2019) – left fielder and first baseman for the St. Louis Cardinals
- Shelley Duncan (born 1979) – former MLB left fielder
- Karl Eller (1928–2019) – owner of the Phoenix Suns
- Sean Elliott (born 1968) – basketball player
- Brady Ellison (born 1988) – competitive archer, World Champion and Olympian
- Julie Ertz (born 1992) – defender for the United States women's national soccer team and Chicago Red Stars
- Andre Ethier (born 1982) – outfielder for the Los Angeles Dodgers
- Nick Evans (born 1986) – player for the Tohoku Rakuten Golden Eagles
- Jeff Feagles (born 1966) – NFL punter
- Carrick Felix (born 1990) – player for the Utah Jazz
- Ryan Fitzpatrick (born 1982) – NFL quarterback for the Miami Dolphins
- D. J. Foster (born 1993) – NFL running back for the New England Patriots
- Channing Frye (born 1983) – center and power forward for the Phoenix Suns
- Brianna & Nicole Garcia (born 1983) – professional wrestling twins, WWE 2007–2012
- Luis Fernando González Hoenig (born 1995), baseball outfielder for the San Francisco Giants
- David Gossett (born 1979) – professional golfer
- Jim Grabb (born 1964) – tennis player ranked World No. 1 in doubles
- Superstar Billy Graham (born 1943) – professional wrestler
- Everson Griffen (born 1987) – defensive end for the Minnesota Vikings
- Eric Hagg (born 1989) – safety for the Cleveland Browns
- Scott Hairston (born 1980) – left fielder for the San Diego Padres
- Max Hall (born 1985) – quarterback for the Arizona Cardinals
- J. J. Hardy (born 1982) – shortstop for the Baltimore Orioles
- Billy Hatcher (born 1960) – MLB player and coach
- Mickey Hatcher (born 1955) – MLB player and coach
- Todd Heap (born 1980) – tight end for the Baltimore Ravens
- Charlie Hickcox (1947–2010) – competitive swimmer, three-time Olympic Champion
- Austin Hollins (born 1991) – basketball player for Maccabi Tel Aviv of the Israeli Basketball Premier League
- Misty Hyman (born 1979) – 2000 Olympics gold medalist swimmer
- Richie Incognito (born 1983) – guard for the Buffalo Bills
- Helen Jacobs (1908–1997) – tennis player, member of International Tennis Hall of Fame
- Robert James (born 1983) – linebacker for the Atlanta Falcons
- J. J. Jansen (born 1986) – long snapper for the Carolina Panthers
- Richard Jefferson (born 1980) – small forward for the Dallas Mavericks
- Brian Jennings (born 1976) – long snapper and tight end for the San Francisco 49ers
- Elliot Johnson (born 1984) – utility player for the Cleveland Indians
- Nick Johnson (born 1992) – basketball player in the Israeli Basketball Premier League
- Levi Jones (born 1979) – offensive tackle for the Washington Redskins
- Cameron Jordan (born 1989) – defensive end for the New Orleans Saints
- Ryan Kalil (born 1985) – center for the Carolina Panthers
- Devon Kennard (born 1991) – linebacker for the New York Giants
- Steve Kerr (born 1965) – head coach of the Golden State Warriors
- Scott Kingery (born 1994) – baseball player for the Philadelphia Phillies
- Ian Kinsler (born 1982) – Israeli-American 4-time All Star second baseman in Major League Baseball, Olympian
- Paul Konerko (born 1976) – first baseman for the Chicago White Sox
- Kyle Kosier (born 1978) – guard for the Dallas Cowboys
- Rick Kranitz (born 1958) – pitching coach for the Atlanta Braves
- Frank Kush (1929–2017) – head football coach for Arizona State and NFL's Baltimore Colts
- Spencer Larsen (born 1984) – NFL fullback
- Jon Levine (born 1963) – tennis player
- Kevin Long (born 1966) – hitting coach for the New York Mets
- Lou Marson (born 1986) – catcher for the Cleveland Indians
- Doug Mathis (born 1983) – relief pitcher for the Texas Rangers
- Auston Matthews (born 1997) – center for the Toronto Maple Leafs
- Billy Mayfair (born 1966) – professional golfer
- Mickey McConnell (born 1989) – player for the Texas Legends
- Randall McDaniel (born 1964) – NFL offensive guard; member of both the College and Pro Football Hall of Fame
- Michael McDowell (born 1984) – NASCAR driver
- Phil Mickelson (born 1970) – professional golfer
- Zach Miller (born 1985) – tight end for the Seattle Seahawks
- Brad Mills (born 1985) – relief pitcher for the Toronto Blue Jays
- Bryce Molder (born 1979) – professional golfer
- Arte Moreno (born 1946) – owner of the Los Angeles Angels of Anaheim
- Trent Murphy (born 1990) – linebacker for the Washington Redskins
- Brett Nicholas (born 1988) – catcher for the Texas Rangers
- Bart Oates (born 1958) – center for the New York Giants and San Francisco 49ers
- Larry Owens (born 1983) – player for the San Antonio Spurs
- Jim Palmer (born 1945) – starting pitcher for the Baltimore Orioles and Baseball Hall of Famer
- Danica Patrick (born 1982) – auto racing driver competing in the Indy Racing League and NASCAR
- James Pazos (born 1991) – relief pitcher for the New York Yankees
- Ricky Pearsall (born 2000) – wide receiver for the San Francisco 49ers
- Andrus Peat (born 1993) – offensive tackle for the New Orleans Saints
- Rodney Peete (born 1966) – USC and NFL quarterback
- Pat Perez (born 1976) – professional golfer
- Scott Pinckney (born 1989) – professional golfer
- Mike Pollak (born 1985) – guard for the Cincinnati Bengals
- Don Pooley (born 1951) – professional golfer
- Brock Purdy (born 1999) – NFL quarterback
- Ted Purdy (born 1973) – professional golfer
- Marilyn Ramenofsky (born 1946) – competitive swimmer, Olympic medalist
- Brooks Reed (born 1987) – defensive end for the Atlanta Falcons
- Danny Schayes (born 1959) – college and NBA basketball player, son of Dolph Schayes
- Chaz Schilens (born 1985) – wide receiver for the Saskatchewan Roughriders
- Curt Schilling (born 1966) – professional baseball pitcher and broadcaster
- Tyler Schmitt (born 1986) – NFL long snapper
- Wes Schweitzer (born 1993) – offensive guard for the Atlanta Falcons
- Lyle Sendlein (born 1984) – center for the Arizona Cardinals
- Paul Silas (1943–2022) – NBA player and coach
- Shelley Smith (born 1987) – guard for the Houston Texans
- Eric Sogard (born 1986) – second baseman for the Oakland Athletics
- Karsten Solheim (1911–2000) – creator and founder of PING
- Sammy Solis (born 1988) – relief pitcher for the Washington Nationals
- Ken Stabler (1945–2015) – four-time Pro Bowl NFL quarterback, primarily with the Oakland Raiders
- Kerri Strug (born 1977) – gymnast; 1996 Olympic gold medalist
- Marcus Thomas (born 1984) – NFL running back
- Michael Thompson (born 1985) – professional golfer
- Pat Tillman (1976–2004) – college and pro football player killed in Afghanistan
- Tim Toone (born 1985) – wide receiver for the Atlanta Falcons
- Howard Twitty (born 1949) – professional golfer
- Cain Velasquez (born 1982) – professional wrestler, retired mixed martial artist
- Bobby Wade (born 1981) – wide receiver for the Kansas City Chiefs
- Neal Walk (1948–2015) – basketball player
- Ken Westerfield (born 1947) – disc sports (frisbee) pioneer
- Markus Wheaton (born 1991) – wide receiver for the Pittsburgh Steelers
- Danny White – professional football player for the Dallas Cowboys
- Tom Wilhelmsen (born 1983) – relief pitcher for the Seattle Mariners
- Dot Wilkinson (1921–2023) – Hall of Fame inductee for bowling and softball
- Alan Williams (born 1993) – player for the Phoenix Suns
- Jeremy Wolf (born 1993) – American-Israeli baseball player on the Israel national baseball team
- Darren Woodson (born 1969) – professional football player for the Dallas Cowboys
- J. J. Yeley (born 1976) – NASCAR driver

== Miscellaneous ==
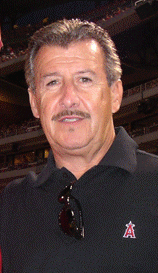
Arte Moreno

- Chris Buskirk – businessman and writer, co-founder of 1789 Capital and Rockbridge Network
- Johnny Chan – professional poker player, 10–time World Series of Poker champion
- Chuggaaconroy – YouTube personality and Let's Player
- Angel Delgadillo – founder of the Historic Route 66 Association of Arizona and retired barber
- Ephraim of Arizona – Greek Orthodox hieromonk, Athonite elder, and archimandrite in the Greek Orthodox Archdiocese of America
- Ernest Garcia II – founder of DriveTime, major shareholder of Carvana
- Grumpy Cat (2012–2019) – Internet celebrity cat
- Rob Leatham – professional shooter, 24-time USPSA National champion
- Emmanuel Lemelson – Greek Orthodox priest, social commentator and hedge fund manager
- Jerry Meek – evangelist and land developer
- Arte Moreno – billionaire businessman, owner of Los Angeles Angels
- Kayla Mueller – activist
- Aron Ra – president of the Atheist Alliance of America, host of the Ra-Men podcast
- Rick Alan Ross – deprogrammer
- Mark Shoen – billionaire businessman, vice president of U-Haul
- María Urquides – educator, "mother of bilingual education"

== Fictional characters ==
- Michelle Chang and Julia Chang, from the Tekken fighting video game series
- Eleanor from The Good Place
- Jane Margolis from Breaking Bad, born in Phoenix
- Annie Porter from Speed; played by Sandra Bullock
- John Rambo from First Blood and Rambo movies; born in Bowie
- Bella Swan from the Twilight saga

== See also ==
- List of Arizona suffragists
- Lists of Americans
