= Ta-Na-E-Ka =

1972 fictional short story

Ta-Na-E-Ka is a short story, first published in a 1972 Scholastic Voices textbook and commonly used in the United States elementary education. Ta-Na-E-Ka describes a fictional ritual undertaken by two children of the Kaw people, ten-year-old Mary and her ten-year-old cousin, Roger.

== Synopsis ==
In the story, at age eleven the Kaw go through ta-na-e-ka, a test of outdoor endurance and survival. Complaining to her teacher and mother that she does not want to go through the ceremony, Mary is taught that it is part of her heritage and that she should be proud. After a month of training, Mary and Roger are sent into the wilderness along the banks of the Missouri River to survive for five days. After spending a day struggling, the children eventually come across a restaurant, where they pay the owner to allow them to eat and sleep until the test is over. Returning to her grandfather at the end of ta-na-e-ka, Mary tells of what they did, and while the grandfather is initially upset that they survived without struggling, he then accepts her resourcefulness.

== Author ==
The story is credited to the pseudonym "Mary Whitebird", and little is known about its author's true identity. "Whitebird" is reported to be a reclusive Arizona-born writer and filmmaker whose interest in Native American culture began in high school in Rochester, New York, where the author met students of Seneca and Onondaga heritage. While living on an Army base in West Texas in the 1950s, "Whitebird" befriended a member of the Sac and Fox Nation, and "drove to all the neighboring reservations (mostly Apache)" and "saw firsthand some of the injustices... Accorded the Indians". This experience led the author to write letters to the local newspapers about injustices witnessed on the reservations, signed "M. Whitebird", a name the author chose as "sound[ing] generally Indian". Later, "Whitebird" wrote of meeting a teenaged Navajo girl, Jenny, whose Navajo name was Granddaughter-of-he-who-sings; Jenny's difficulty balancing her desire to explore the greater world with her allegiance to Navajo customs inspired the "character" of "Mary Whitebird".

== Accuracy ==
"Whitebird" claimed that the Kaw tribe was largely wiped out in the early twentieth century by tuberculosis and cholera; in reality, the Kaw people continue to exist as a federally recognized Native American tribe. In 2012, a complete dictionary of the Kaw language was compiled, and contains no words or phrases resembling ta-na-e-ka e. Among the Dhegiha sub-group of the Siouan languages, which includes the Kaw people, no such rite as ta-na-e-ka has ever been recorded.
