= Jerry Meek (builder) =

- Born: September 11, 1958 (age 68); Chicago, Illinois
- Occupations: General contractor, entrepreneur, philanthropist and author

Gerald “Jerry” Robert Meek (born September 11, 1958, in Chicago, Illinois) is an American general contractor, entrepreneur, philanthropist and author.

== Biography ==
Jerry Meek is one of three children born to Gerald E. Meek and Ida J. (Bea Gardy) Meek, who is the eldest daughter and third born of 15 children. He has one younger brother, Richard Meek, and one older sister, Sara. He is the great nephew of the first U.S. Marshal of the Oregon territories, Joseph Meek.

Throughout his childhood, Meek was surrounded by music played by his father, a professional trumpet player and manager of the territory band Leo Peeper and His Orchestra, and his mother, Bea Gardy, who was a singer and signed recording artist with Decca Records Records.

To support his family, Meek's father began to work as a superintendent and owned G. Meek Construction where he brought Meek to construction sites by the time he was 5-years-old.

== Career ==
In 1972, Meek, his parents, brother and sister settled in Arizona when Meek was a freshman in high school. By age 14, he'd started his first business in Tempe — a landscaping company.

At age 18, Meek forged a carpentry business with his father that serviced the custom home and commercial markets. At the urging of architect George Christensen, FAIA five years later Meek and his father obtained their General Contractor's Licenses and founded Desert Star Construction on February 14, 1978.

== Desert Star Construction ==
Together with his father, Meek established Desert Star Construction (DSC) as a full-service construction services company in Arizona specializing in building luxury custom homes, commercial properties and renovations, and eventually sustainable "green" building.

Meek became CEO and President of DSC at the age of 27.

== Sustainable Building ==
Since the early 1980s, Meek has built “green” custom residential and commercial projects with Desert Star Construction. The company increased its association with green development in 2009, adding a LEED AP to its development team and beginning to develop Gold LEED projects.

Meek built the first Net-Zero Energy custom home in Paradise Valley, Arizona and the first LEED-certified new custom home in Paradise Valley.

Meek led the renovation and sustainable retrofitting of Arizona's first Gold LEED-certified full-service commercial restaurant El Chorro Lodge.

== Glorious Reflections ==
Meek is the founder of Glorious Reflections, which was established in order to provide spiritual community and guidance to business executives. Beyond Christian fellowship, the community publishes a newsletter, a team building toolbox, and issues a “21 Day Reflections Challenge” to its members.

== Books ==
In 2015 Meek published his first book, entitled Team Builder Toolbox: 13 Tools To Build The Power Of Your Team. The book compiles a list of recommendations for business executives to improve their leadership skills. In 2018 Meek published the book Be Great … Before It’s Too Late, which draws lessons from people across history that Meek determines to be “extraordinary” in order to distill what the reader can learn from them in their own lives. Meek then published the book Leadership on the Level in 2021, which combines lessons from scripture and business world case studies. He is also a public speaker.

== Philanthropy ==
Meek led the renovation of The Phoenix Dream Center kitchen, a 1,200-square-foot breakfast bar into 4,000-square-foot, fully stocked kitchen that serves an average 750,000 people a year.

Meek also led a major renovation project for The Phoenix Dream Center to design and rebuild ten “Dream Rooms” associated with The Rescue Project Program in support of human trafficking victims.
