= List of burials at Salt Lake City Cemetery =

Coordinates: 40.774497°N 111.86348°W

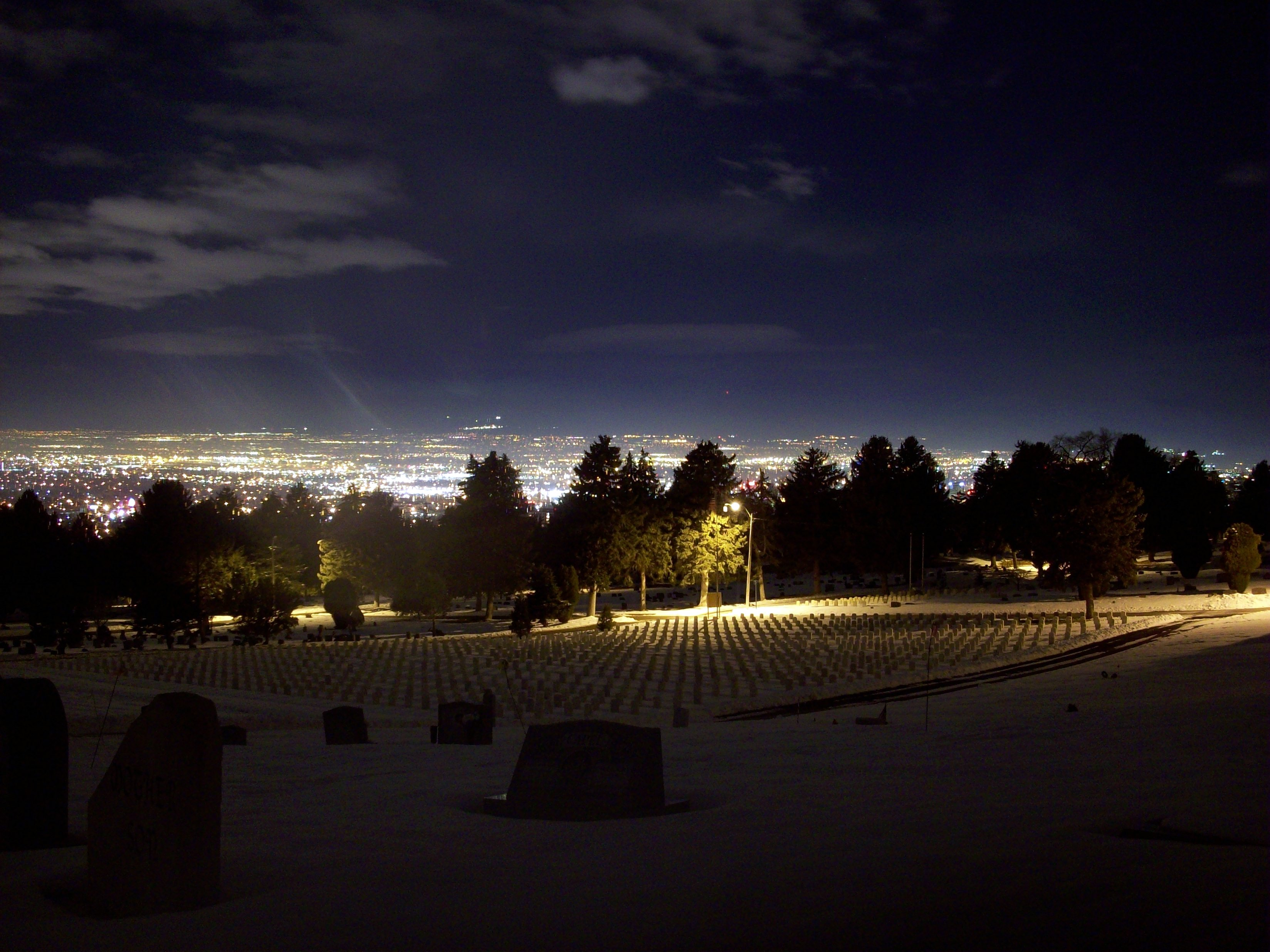
The northern section of the cemetery at night, looking towards Salt Lake City

The Salt Lake City Cemetery is in The Avenues neighborhood of Salt Lake City, Utah. Approximately 120,000 persons are buried in the cemetery. Many religious leaders and politicians, particularly many leaders of the Church of Jesus Christ of Latter-day Saints (LDS Church) lie in the cemetery. It encompasses over 250 acres (1.0 km^{2}) and contains 9 1/2 miles of roads. It is the largest city-operated cemetery in the United States.

== Notable burials ==
=== A-G ===
| Name | Birth | Death | Notes |
|---|---|---|---|
| Truman O. Angell | June 5, 1810 | October 16, 1887 | LDS Architect of Salt Lake Temple, Salt Lake Tabernacle, and other edifices |
| Melvin J. Ballard | February 9, 1873 | July 30, 1939 | LDS Church Apostle |
| M. Russell Ballard | October 8, 1929 | November 12, 2023 | LDS Church Apostle |
| Simon Bamberger | February 27, 1846 | October 6, 1926 | Fourth Governor of Utah |
| Bob Bennett | September 18, 1933 | May 4, 2016 | U.S. Senator (Son of Wallace Bennet) |
| Wallace Bennett | November 13, 1898 | December 19, 1993 | U.S. Senator |
| Adam S. Bennion | December 2, 1886 | February 11, 1958 | LDS Church Apostle |
| Mervyn S. Bennion | May 5, 1887 | December 7, 1941 | US Navy Captain killed during Japanese attack on Pearl Harbor |
| John Milton Bernhisel | June 23, 1799 | September 28, 1881 | Delegate to U.S. Congress from Utah Territory |
| Albert E. Bowen | October 31, 1875 | July 15, 1953 | LDS Church Apostle |
| Hugh B. Brown | October 24, 1883 | December 2, 1975 | LDS Church Apostle |
| Thomas Bullock | December 23, 1816 | February 10, 1885 | Member of the Council of Fifty and clerk to Joseph Smith and Brigham Young |
| John Thomas Caine | January 8, 1829 | September 20, 1911 | Delegate to U.S. Congress from Utah Territory |
| Charles A. Callis | May 4, 1865 | January 21, 1947 | LDS Church Apostle |
| Dr. Martha Hughes Cannon | July 1, 1857 | July 10, 1932 | Elected Utah State Senator in 1896—first female State Senator in the U.S. |
| George Q. Cannon | January 11, 1827 | April 12, 1901 | LDS Church Apostle and Delegate to U.S. Congress from Utah Territory |
| Sylvester Q. Cannon | June 10, 1877 | May 29, 1943 | LDS Church Apostle |
| Thomas Battersby Child | May 6, 1888 | November 3, 1963 | Creator of the Gilgal Sculpture Garden |
| J. Reuben Clark | September 1, 1871 | October 6, 1961 | LDS Church Apostle, U.S. Ambassador to Mexico and U.S. Undersecretary of State |
| Rudger Clawson | March 12, 1857 | June 21, 1943 | LDS Church Apostle |
| William Clayton | July 17, 1814 | December 4, 1879 | Mormon pioneer, inventor, lyricist and scribe |
| Matthew Cowley | August 2, 1897 | December 13, 1953 | LDS Church Apostle |
| John Christopher Cutler | February 5, 1846 | July 30, 1928 | Utah Governor |
| Hugh W. Dougall | March 6, 1872 | May 2, 1963 | LDS hymn writer. Works include "Jesus of Nazareth, Savior and King", music to "Come Unto Him". and "The Bridge Builder". |
| Richard L. Evans | March 23, 1906 | November 1, 1971 | LDS Church Apostle |
| James C. Fletcher | June 5, 1919 | December 22, 1991 | Administrator of NASA and University of Utah President |
| David Fullmer | July 7, 1803 | October 21, 1879 | Utah politician |
| Heber J. Grant | November 22, 1856 | May 14, 1945 | LDS Church President |
| Jedediah M. Grant | February 21, 1816 | December 1, 1856 | LDS Church Apostle and Salt Lake City's first Mayor |

=== H-P ===
| Name | Birth | Death | Notes |
|---|---|---|---|
| Conrad B. Harrison | July 15, 1911 | February 12, 2008 | Salt Lake City Mayor |
| Alonzo A. Hinckley | April 23, 1870 | December 22, 1936 | LDS Church Apostle |
| Gordon B. Hinckley | June 23, 1910 | January 27, 2008 | LDS Church President |
| William Henry Hooper | December 25, 1813 | December 30, 1882 | Delegate to U.S. Congress from Utah Territory |
| Edward Hunter | June 22, 1793 | October 16, 1883 | Third and longest serving Presiding Bishop of LDS Church. |
| Howard W. Hunter | November 14, 1907 | March 3, 1995 | LDS Church President |
| Anthony W. Ivins | September 16, 1852 | September 23, 1934 | LDS Church Apostle |
| William Jennings | September 13, 1823 | January 15, 1886 | Salt Lake City Mayor |
| Edward P. Kimball | June 2, 1882 | March 15, 1937 | Organist of the Mormon Tabernacle Choir and a hymn writer. |
| J. Golden Kimball | June 9, 1853 | September 2, 1938 | LDS General Authority |
| Spencer W. Kimball | March 28, 1895 | November 5, 1985 | LDS Church President |
| William H. King | June 3, 1863 | November 27, 1949 | United States Senator |
| Harold B. Lee | March 28, 1899 | December 26, 1973 | LDS Church President |
| Sherman P. Lloyd | January 11, 1914 | December 15, 1979 | U.S. Representative from Utah |
| Karl G. Maeser | January 16, 1828 | February 15, 1901 | President of Brigham Young Academy (forerunner of Brigham Young University (1876-1892)) |
| Herbert B. Maw | March 11, 1893 | November 17, 1990 | Utah Governor |
| Clarence L. Maxwell | 1860 | August 23, 1909 | gunfighter and businessman |
| Neal A. Maxwell | July 6, 1926 | July 21, 2004 | LDS Church Apostle |
| Bruce R. McConkie | July 29, 1915 | April 19, 1985 | LDS Church Apostle |
| David O. McKay | September 8, 1873 | January 18, 1970 | LDS Church President |
| Joseph F. Merrill | August 24, 1868 | February 3, 1952 | LDS Church Apostle |
| Larry H. Miller | April 26, 1944 | February 20, 2009 | Utah businessman and philanthropist |
| Thomas S. Monson | August 21, 1927 | January 2, 2018 | LDS Church President |
| George Q. Morris | February 20, 1874 | April 23, 1962 | LDS Church Apostle |
| Frank Moss | September 23, 1911 | January 29, 2003 | U.S. Senator |
| Henry D. Moyle | April 22, 1889 | September 18, 1963 | LDS Church Apostle |
| Joseph White Musser | March 8, 1872 | March 29, 1954 | Early Senior leader of the Mormon fundamentalist movement |
| Alexander Neibaur | January 8, 1808 | December 15, 1883 | Among the first dentists to practice in Utah, and one of the first Jews to join the LDS Church |
| Russell M. Nelson | September 9, 1924 | September 27, 2025 | LDS Church President |
| Wayne Owens | May 2, 1937 | December 18, 2002 | U.S. Representative from Utah |
| Charles W. Penrose | February 4, 1832 | May 16, 1925 | LDS Church Apostle |
| L. Tom Perry | August 5, 1922 | May 30, 2015 | LDS Church Apostle |
| William Wines Phelps | February 17, 1792 | March 7, 1872 | Early LDS Church Leader and songwriter |
| Orson Pratt | September 19, 1811 | October 3, 1881 | LDS Church Apostle |

=== R-Z ===
| Name | Birth | Death | Notes |
|---|---|---|---|
| Cal Rampton | November 6, 1913 | September 16, 2007 | 11th Utah Governor |
| Joseph Lafayette Rawlins | March 28, 1850 | May 24, 1926 | U.S. Senator |
| George F. Richards | February 23, 1861 | August 8, 1950 | LDS Church Apostle |
| LeGrand Richards | February 6, 1886 | January 11, 1983 | LDS Church Apostle |
| Willard Richards | June 24, 1804 | March 11, 1854 | LDS Church Apostle |
| Matthew Stanford Robison Memorial | September 23, 1988 | February 21, 1999 | 10 year old disabled boy - his memorial became an attraction |
| Porter Rockwell | June 28, 1813 or June 25, 1815 | June 9, 1878 | Bodyguard to Joseph Smith, Jr. and Brigham Young |
| Arthur Shepherd | February 19, 1880 | January 12, 1958 | Composer and conductor |
| Eldred G. Smith | January 9, 1907 | April 4, 2013 | Last Presiding Patriarch for the LDS Church |
| George A. Smith | June 26, 1817 | September 1, 1875 | LDS Church Apostle |
| George Albert Smith | April 4, 1870 | April 4, 1951 | LDS Church President |
| Hyrum Mack Smith | March 21, 1872 | January 23, 1918 | LDS Church Apostle |
| John Smith | July 16, 1781 | May 23, 1854 | Uncle of Joseph Smith and 4th Presiding Patriarch of the LDS Church |
| John Henry Smith | September 18, 1848 | October 13, 1911 | LDS Church Apostle |
| Joseph F. Smith | November 13, 1838 | November 19, 1918 | LDS Church President |
| Joseph Fielding Smith | July 19, 1876 | July 2, 1972 | LDS Church President |
| Erastus Snow | November 9, 1818 | May 27, 1888 | LDS Church Apostle |
| William Spry | January 11, 1864 | April 21, 1929 | Third Governor of Utah |
| Joseph Standing | October 5, 1854 | July 21, 1879 | LDS missionary murdered while serving |
| James E. Talmage | September 21, 1862 | July 27, 1933 | LDS Church Apostle, scientist, and University of Utah President |
| Nathan Eldon Tanner | May 9, 1898 | November 27, 1982 | LDS Church Apostle and Speaker of the Legislative Assembly of Alberta, Canada |
| John W. Taylor | May 15, 1858 | October 10, 1916 | LDS Church Apostle |
| John Taylor | November 1, 1808 | July 25, 1887 | LDS Church President |
| George Teasdale | December 8, 1831 | June 9, 1907 | LDS Church Apostle |
| Elbert D. Thomas | June 17, 1883 | February 11, 1953 | U.S. Senator |
| Olean Walker | November 15, 1930 | November 28, 2015 | 15th Governor of Utah |
| Mary M. Wallace | January 8, 1847 | September 27, 1847 | The first known burial in the Salt Lake Cemetery |
| Mere Mete Whaanga | February 15, 1848 | May 11, 1944 | Maori tribal leader and missionary |
| Daniel H. Wells | October 27, 1814 | March 24, 1891 | LDS Church Apostle and Salt Lake City Mayor |
| Heber Manning Wells | August 11, 1859 | March 12, 1938 | Utah's first Governor |
| Orson F. Whitney | July 1, 1855 | May 16, 1931 | LDS Church Apostle |
| John A. Widtsoe | January 31, 1872 | November 29, 1952 | LDS Church Apostle and University of Utah President |
| Lester Wire | September 3, 1887 | April 14, 1958 | Inventor of the traffic light |
| Wilford Woodruff | March 1, 1807 | September 2, 1898 | LDS Church President |
| Edward Woods | July 5, 1903 | October 8, 1989 | American actor |

== Grave of Lilly Gray ==
The headstone of Lilly E. Gray, located in the far northeast of the cemetery (Plot X-1-169-4E), has long attracted attention and visitors from all over America, on account of its unusual inscription:

Lilly E. Gray / June 6, 1881 – November 14, 1958 / Victim of the Beast 666

Little is known of Lilly Gray's life beyond basic records. On July 10, 1952, she married Elmer Gray, a serial felon who had served time in the Missouri State Prison, the Oklahoma State Prison, the Colorado State Prison, and, for eleven years, in the Utah State Prison. Lilly and Elmer were 72 and 71 respectively. Lilly died in 1958 of natural causes with no indication of foul play. The reason for the inscription is not known, but her husband had shown some indications of possible paranoia, and presumably ordered the headstone. But much amateur speculation has surrounded the grave, and rumors and legends of paranormal or Satanic associations have circulated.

== The Tomb of Jacob Moritz ==
The tomb of Jacob Moritz, sometimes referred to in local legends as "Emo's Grave," is associated with alleged paranormal activity. According to these tales, actions like walking around the grave six times with lights or chanting the name "Emo" are believed to cause supernatural events. Reported occurrences include sightings of red eyes through the tomb's grate or a face in the mausoleum window. Some stories suggest that the grave glows at night or associates "Emo" with different historically inaccurate figures, such as a miner.

Jacob Moritz was an early Utah politician and founder of the Salt Lake Brewery, was interred in this tomb after his death in Germany in 1910. His ashes were initially placed in the mausoleum, but due to repeated vandalism, the urn was removed, and its location is now unknown.
