= Matthew Stanford Robison Memorial =

Memorial located in Salt Lake City Utah

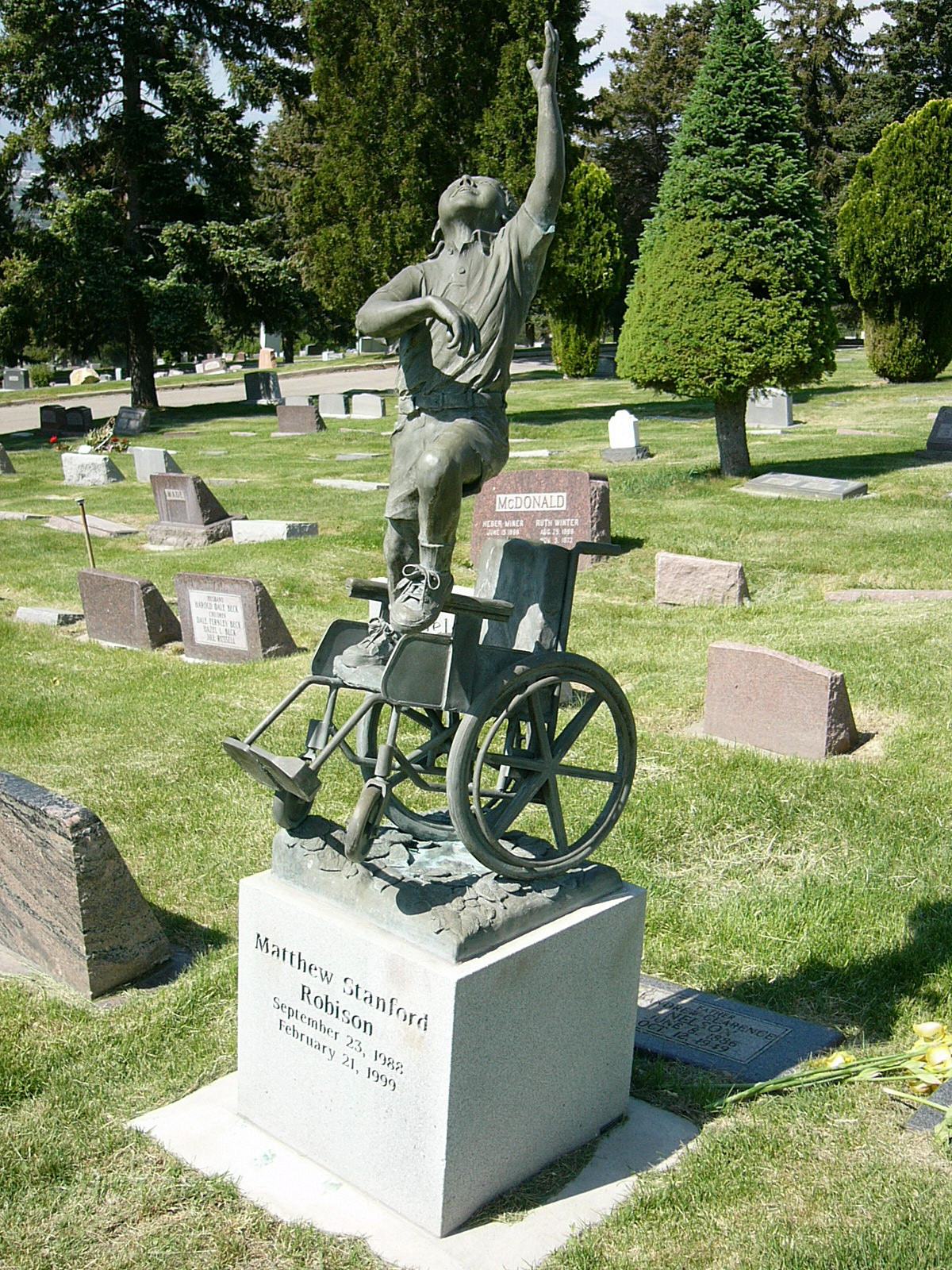
- The grave monument for Matthew Stanford Robison (Note: Inscription on the back of the memorial: "In memory of those who walk more closely in the hands of God And who more humbly lift the world inspiring the hearts of men With their legacy complete In love, they return home again to God To behold his face and be wholly healed In joy forever more.")
- Interactive map of Matthew Stanford Robison Memorial
- Location: Salt Lake City Cemetery WEST_6_130_1W
- Coordinates: 40°46′37″N 111°51′32″W
- Designer: Ernest Robison
- Height: 9 ft (2.7 m)
- Beginning date: February 21, 1999
- Completion date: 2000
- Dedicated to: Matthew Stanford Robison
- Website: Ability Found Non-Profit

The Matthew Stanford Robison Memorial is a gravesite marker located in Salt Lake City Cemetery. It was designed by Matthew Stanford Robison's father Ernest. Matthew's parents decided to make his gravesite a place of joy and inspiration. The memorial depicts a boy standing up from his wheelchair and raising his left hand toward the sky.

== Background ==
Matthew Stanford Robison was born on September 23, 1988, in Salt Lake City, Utah to parents Ernest and Anneke Robison. Deprived of oxygen, he was not expected to live. Because the boy did not get enough oxygen at birth, he was born blind and partially paralyzed. He died on February 21, 1999, at age 10.

The Robisons started a Nonprofit organization called Ability Found in 1993 to help people with disabilities buy medical equipment. The non-profit helps those with Cerebral palsy, spina bifida, multiple sclerosis, stroke, cancer and traumatic injuries. The foundation also sells replicas of the boy's tombstone memorial.

== History of memorial ==
In 2000, Ernest Robison decided to make a memorial to his son. The statue on the gravesite depicts Matthew rising up out of his wheelchair and reaching skyward.

The memorial is meant to depict the child in the afterlife, free from his earthly afflictions.

A photo of the memorial and part of the obituary was shared on Reddit, and it went viral. The gravesite had been a Utah tourist attraction appearing on several travel websites as a place to visit.

== See also ==
- Birth defect
- Hypoxia (medical)
- List of congenital disorders
- List of burials at Salt Lake City Cemetery
- Memorial
