= Atlanta Temple =

Atlanta Temple may refer to:

- Atlanta Georgia Temple, a Church of Jesus Christ of Latter-day Saints temple in Sandy Springs, Georgia
- The Temple (Atlanta), a Reform Jewish synagogue in Atlanta
