= The Church of Jesus Christ of Latter-day Saints in Georgia =

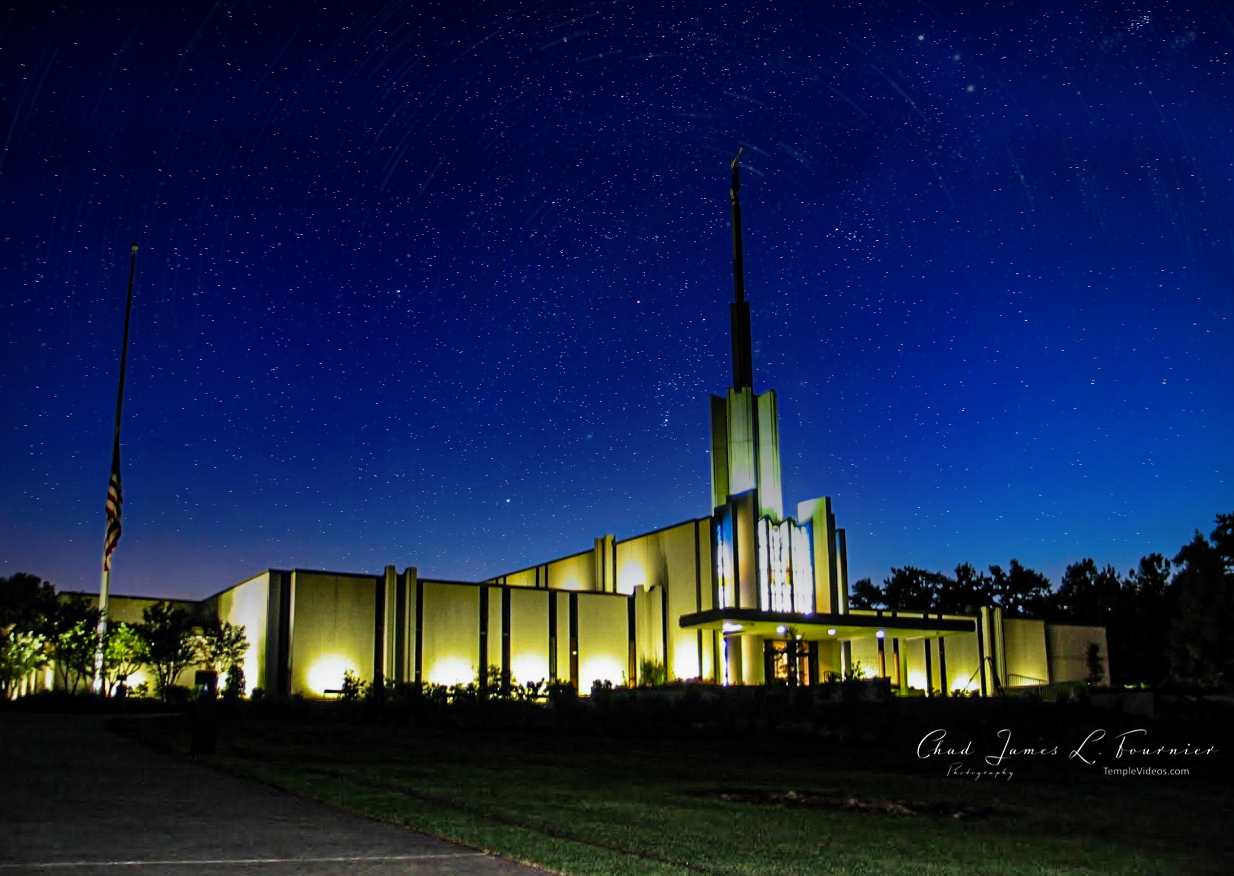
- The Atlanta Georgia Temple at night.
- Area: US Southeast
- Members: 92,581 (2025)
- Stakes: 19
- Wards: 135
- Branches: 28
- Total Congregations: 163
- Missions: 2
- Temples: 1
- FamilySearch Centers: 44

The Church of Jesus Christ of Latter-day Saints in Georgia refers to the Church of Jesus Christ of Latter-day Saints (LDS Church) and its members in Georgia. The first branch in Georgia was organized in 1876. It has since grown to 92,581 members in 163 congregations.

Official church membership as a percentage of general population was 0.82% in 2014. According to the 2014 Pew Forum on Religion & Public Life survey, roughly 1% of Georgians self-identify themselves most closely with The Church of Jesus Christ of Latter-day Saints. The LDS Church is the 8th largest denomination in Georgia.

Stakes are located in Athens, Atlanta, Augusta, Cartersville, Coal Mountain, Columbus, Conyers, Fayetteville, Kingsland, Lilburn, Macon, Marietta, Powder Springs, Roswell, Savannah, Sugar Hill, Tifton, and Winder.

== History ==
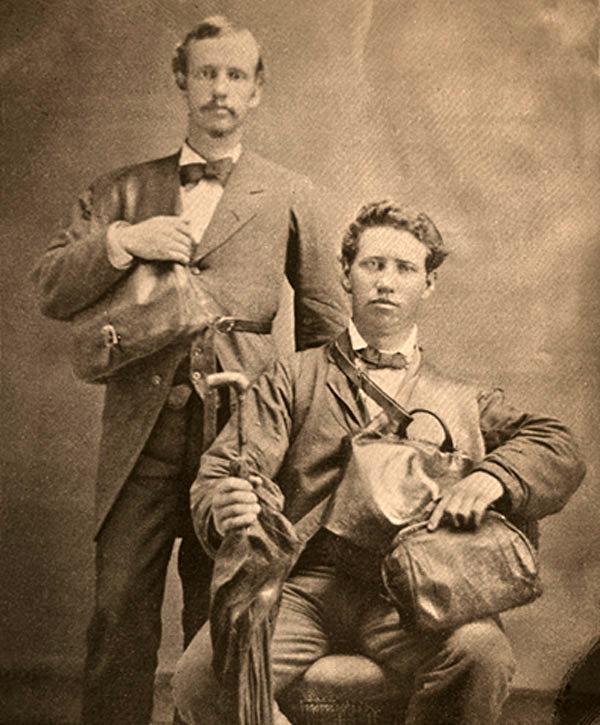
Rudger Clawson (left) and Joseph Standing (right), as they were serving as missionaries for The Church of Jesus Christ of Latter-day Saints

Membership in Georgia
Year	Members
1890	175
1930	4,311
1974	14,360
1980	27,210
1990	41,595
1999	57,857
2009	74,644
2019	87,411
2025	92,581

In 1843, missionary work was briefly opened in Georgia by Elder John U. Eldredge. Other missionaries followed to preach and to campaign for Joseph Smith in his presidential bid. The campaign ceased in 1844 with the death of Joseph Smith, and missionary work halted in 1846.

Missionary work in Georgia resumed in 1878. The Southern States Mission headquarters was established in Rome (60 miles north of Atlanta). One early convert to the Church donated land and built a chapel at Mormon Springs in Haralson County.

Missionaries were initially treated well upon their return to the South, but before long their success led to violent opposition. On July 21, 1879, Elder Joseph Standing was killed by a mob near Varnell's Station. His companion, Rudger Clawson, escaped serious injury. Unable to secure protection for missionaries, the church pulled out all missionaries in Georgia for the next decade. in 1889, a small group of members left to go west by Train.

Missionaries returned to Georgia in 1899, but slowly and cautiously due to disease and persecution. Ohio was added to the Southern States mission at the request of President Ben E. Rich, so he would have a place where ill missionaries could recover.

In 1930, branches were located in Atlanta, Augusta, Columbus, Macon and Savannah. Sunday Schools had been established in Cedar Crossing, Douglas, Empire, Glenwood, Milledgeville, and Thomaston. That year, the state membership was 4,311.

LeGrand Richards, later a member of the Quorum of the Twelve, served as Southern States Mission mission president from 1934 to 1937, and wrote the outline for A Marvelous Work and a Wonder while in Atlanta.

In 1957, the Atlanta Stake was created, taking the northern two-thirds of the state with 3,000 members with wards in Atlanta (2), Columbus, Macon, and Empire. Branches for the stake were located in Buchanan, Athens, Gibson, Milledgeville, and Palmetto. The remainder of the state was covered by the Georgia-Florida and South Georgia districts.

=== Humanitarian relief ===
From Atlanta, hurricane and flood relief has been shipped to many areas of disaster including Hurricane Andrew, the Albany, Georgia flooding in 1994, Hurricane Opal, Hurricane Katrina as well as many other storms and disasters.

In December 1994, the Church donated 158,000 pounds of food through 26 religious and charitable organizations to the hungry in Atlanta. As various natural disasters, such as hurricanes, floods, and tornadoes struck Georgia and other areas across the south, Church members in Georgia responded to supply funds, goods, and volunteer help in the aftermath.

=== Southeast Area based in Atlanta ===
Though its headquarters is publicly in Salt Lake City, many operations for the North America Southeast Area operate through Atlanta.

In 1919 the headquarters of the Southern States mission moved to Atlanta under mission president Charles A. Callis. At that time, this mission stretched as far west as Arkansas and Louisiana, and as far north as Ohio.

In 1983, the Atlanta Georgia Temple was completed and dedicated, being the only temple in the Southeast United States for over 11 years.

Area headquarters in Atlanta include complete temporal and ecclesiastical distribution centers. Family Services for the North America Southeast Area is also based in Atlanta.

== Stakes ==
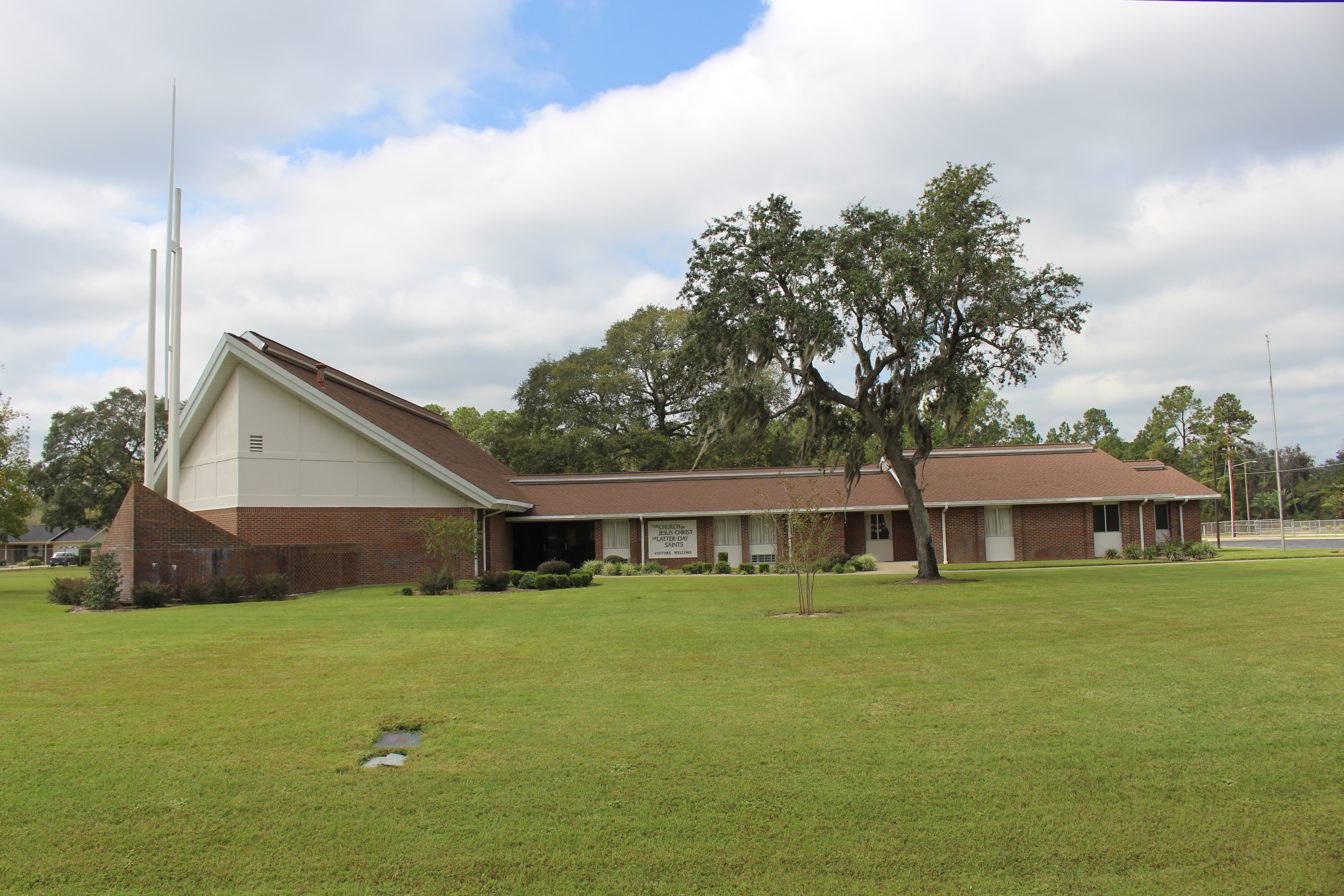
A meetinghouse in Jesup, Georgia

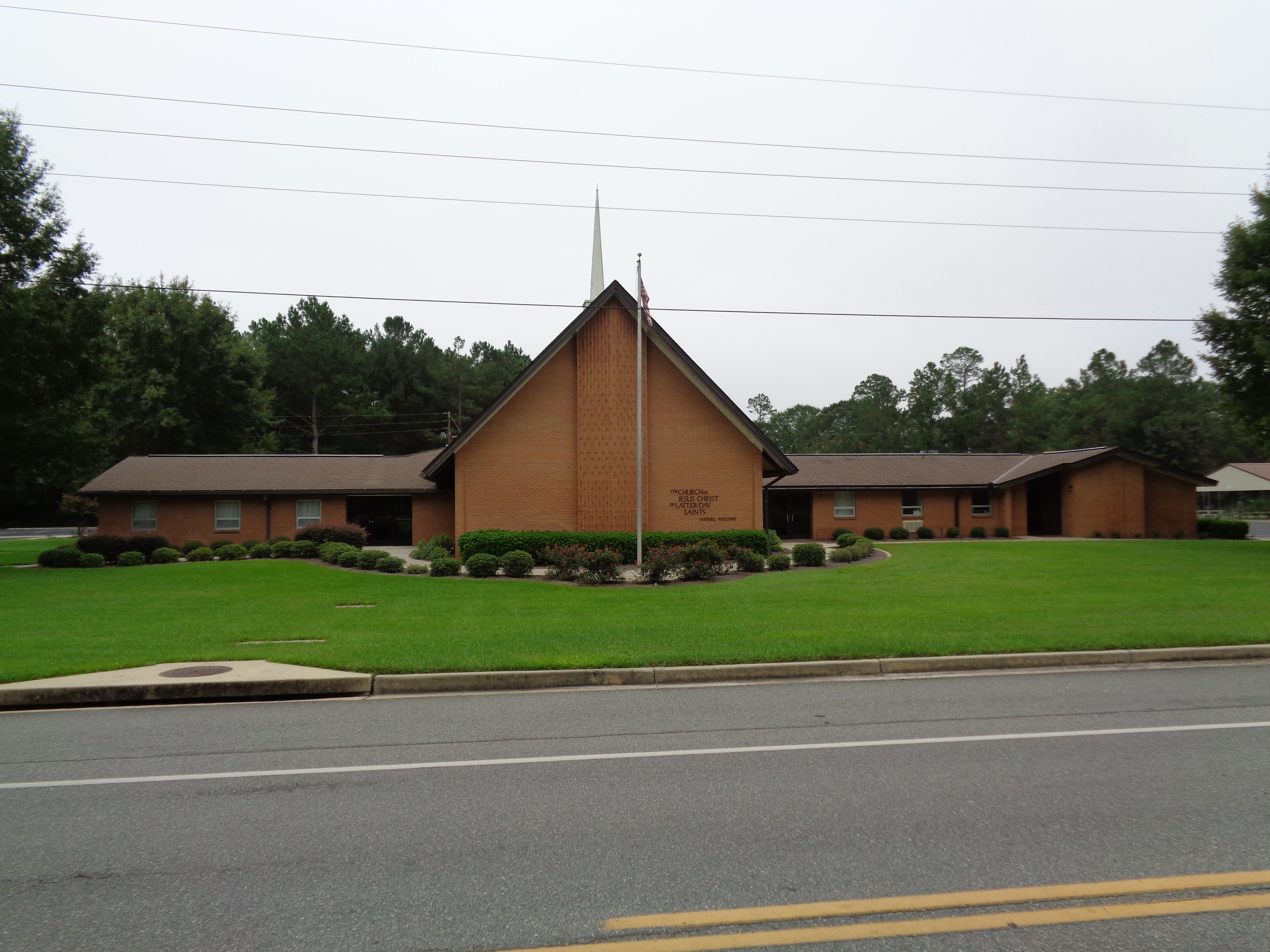
Meetinghouse of The Church of Jesus Christ of Latter-Day Saints in Pearson, Georgia

As of July 2026, the following stakes were located in Georgia:

Stake	Organized	Mission	Temple District
Athens Georgia	2 May 2004	Georgia Atlanta North	Atlanta Georgia
Atlanta Georgia	23 Jun 1996	Georgia Atlanta	Atlanta Georgia
Augusta Georgia	5 Feb 1978	South Carolina Columbia	Columbia South Carolina
Cartersville Georgia	19 Mar 2006	Georgia Atlanta North	Atlanta Georgia
Chattanooga Tennessee (Note: Stake located outside Georgia with congregation(s) meeting in Georgia)	21 May 1978	Tennessee Knoxville	Atlanta Georgia
Coal Mountain Georgia	6 May 2018	Georgia Atlanta North	Atlanta Georgia
Columbus Georgia	15 Jan 1978	Georgia Atlanta	Atlanta Georgia
Conyers Georgia	6 Mar 2011	Georgia Atlanta	Atlanta Georgia
Dothan Alabama	2 Mar 1986	Florida Tallahassee	Tallahassee Florida
Fayetteville Georgia	14 May 1978	Georgia Atlanta	Atlanta Georgia
Hilton Head South Carolina	24 Feb 2019	South Carolina Charleston	Columbia South Carolina
Kingsland Georgia	15 Nov 1987	Florida Jacksonville	Tallahassee Florida
Lilburn Georgia	5 May 1957	Georgia Atlanta North	Atlanta Georgia
Macon Georgia	10 Mar 1963	Georgia Atlanta	Atlanta Georgia
Marietta Georgia	21 Jun 1987	Georgia Atlanta North	Atlanta Georgia
Newnan Georgia	16 Aug 2020	Georgia Atlanta	Atlanta Georgia
Powder Springs Georgia	23 Nov 1980	Georgia Atlanta	Atlanta Georgia
Roswell Georgia	12 May 1974	Georgia Atlanta North	Atlanta Georgia
Savannah Georgia	7 May 1978	South Carolina Charleston	Columbia South Carolina
Sugar Hill Georgia	26 May 1991	Georgia Atlanta North	Atlanta Georgia
Tallahassee Florida	21 Jan 1973	Florida Tallahassee	Tallahassee Florida
Tifton Georgia	26 Oct 1975	Florida Tallahassee	Tallahassee Florida
Winder Georgia	1 Mar 2020	Georgia Atlanta North	Atlanta Georgia

== Missions ==
Atlanta, Georgia became headquarters for the Southern States Mission when it was opened in 1876 with Henry G. Boyle as president. The mission covered the southern United States from Texas east. As more missions were created, the territorial coverage was reduced. In Jun 1971, the Southern States mission was renamed the Georgia-South Carolina Mission. On June 20, 1974, it was renamed the Georgia Atlanta Mission.

Georgia is now home to two missions with two others extending into the state.

Mission	Organized
Florida Jacksonville Mission	July 1, 1987
Georgia Atlanta Mission	Nov 1876
Georgia Atlanta North Mission	July 11, 2003
South Carolina Columbia Mission	July 1, 1975

The Georgia Macon Mission which was organized in 2013 was disorganized in 2019.

== Temples ==
On June 1, 1983 the Atlanta Georgia Temple was dedicated by President Gordon B. Hinckley. For over 11 years (1983-1994), it served as the only temple in the North America Southeast Area.

21. Atlanta Georgia Temple; Official website; News & images	
Location: Announced: Groundbreaking: Dedicated: Rededicated: Size: Notes:	Sandy Springs, Georgia, United States; April 2, 1980 by Spencer W. Kimball; March 7, 1981 by Spencer W. Kimball; June 1, 1983 by Gordon B. Hinckley; November 14, 1997 by Gordon B. Hinckley; 34,500 sq ft (3,210 m^{2}) on a 9.6-acre (3.9 ha) site - designed by Emil B. Fetzer; The rededication in 1997 was for the addition of a new baptistry, two new sealing rooms, and remodeling. In April 2009, the church announced that the Atlanta Temple would close on July 1 for 15 to 18 months for renovations The temple was rededicated by Thomas S. Monson on May 1, 2011

== See also ==
- The Church of Jesus Christ of Latter-day Saints membership statistics (United States)
- John Hamilton Morgan
- Rudger Clawson
