= Hirini Te Rito Whaanga =

New Zealand Mormon missionary (1828–1905)

Hirini Te Rito Whaanga (1828–1905) was a notable New Zealand Mormon missionary.

== Early life ==
Whaanga was born in Māhia Peninsula, Hawke's Bay, New Zealand in 1828. Of Māori descent, he identified with the Ngati Rakaipaaka iwi. Widowed twice, he married his third wife, Mere Mete Whaanga when she was 21. Together, they had three daughters and a son. However, one daughter and their son did not survive past childhood.

== Conversion ==
In 1884, Mormon missionaries came to Hawke's Bay and his wife was receptive to them. The couple were baptized on 30 November by Mormon missionary John C. Stewart. The Whaanga family were some of the first Maori tribe members to be baptized, and they were followed by more than 200 members of their tribe in several weeks. He served as a missionary in New Zealand. Eventually, he moved to Utah with Mere and a group of family members.

== Death ==
He died and was buried there in 1905.
