= Rudger Clawson =

Religious leader (1857–1943)

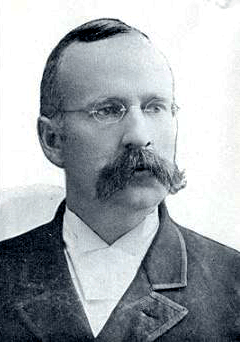

President of the Quorum of the Twelve Apostles
- March 17, 1921 – June 21, 1943
- Predecessor: Anthon H. Lund
- Successor: George Albert Smith

Acting President of the Quorum of the Twelve Apostles
- November 23, 1918 – March 17, 1921
- Reason: Anthon H. Lund was serving as First Counselor in the First Presidency to Heber J. Grant
- End reason: Became President of the Quorum of the Twelve Apostles

Quorum of the Twelve Apostles
- October 10, 1898 – June 21, 1943

Second Counselor in the First Presidency
- October 6, 1901 – October 10, 1901
- Called by: Lorenzo Snow
- Predecessor: Joseph F. Smith
- Successor: Anthon H. Lund
- End reason: Dissolution of First Presidency upon the death of Lorenzo Snow

Quorum of the Twelve Apostles
- October 10, 1898 – October 6, 1901
- Called by: Lorenzo Snow
- End reason: Called as Second Counselor in the First Presidency

LDS Church Apostle
- October 10, 1898 – June 21, 1943
- Called by: Lorenzo Snow
- Reason: Death of Wilford Woodruff; reorganization of First Presidency
- Reorganization at end of term: Spencer W. Kimball and Ezra Taft Benson were ordained following the deaths of Clawson and Sylvester Q. Cannon

Personal details
- Born: Rudger Judd Clawson; March 12, 1857; Salt Lake City, Utah Territory, U.S.
- Died: June 21, 1943 (aged 86); Salt Lake City, Utah, U.S.
- Cause of death: Pneumonia
- Resting place: Salt Lake City Cemetery; 40°46′37.92″N 111°51′28.8″W
- Spouse(s): Florence Ann Dinwoody; Lydia Spencer; Pearl Udall
- Children: 10
- Parents: Hiram B. Clawson; Margaret Judd
- Signature

Rudger Judd Clawson (March 12, 1857 – June 21, 1943) was a member of the Quorum of the Twelve Apostles of the Church of Jesus Christ of Latter-day Saints (LDS Church) from 1898 until his death in 1943. He also served as President of the Quorum of the Twelve Apostles from 1921 until his death. For five days in 1901 he was a member of the First Presidency of the LDS Church.

== Biography ==
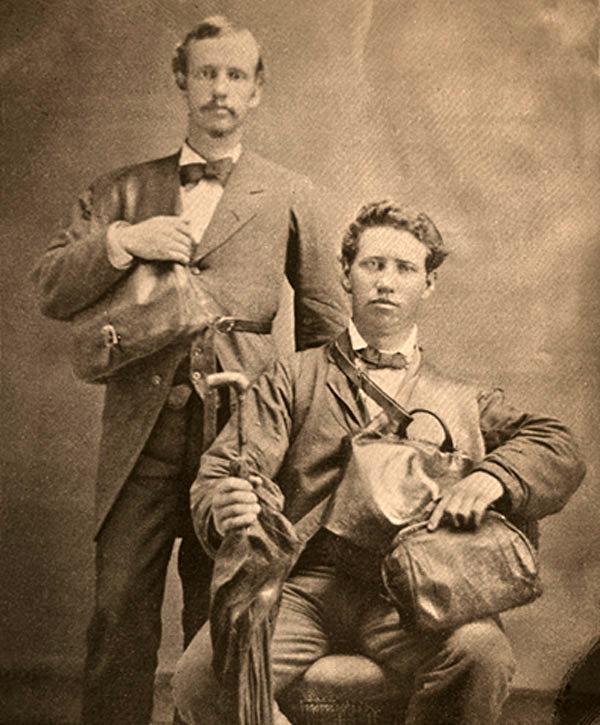
Clawson and Standing during Mission in Georgia

Clawson was born in Salt Lake City, Utah Territory, to Hiram Bradley Clawson and Margaret Judd of Canada.

While serving his mission in Georgia, he faced many challenges, not the least of which was the mounting anti-Mormonism in that sector. On July 21, 1879, Clawson and his missionary companion were standing at Varnell Station, Georgia, when they were surrounded by an angry mob of anti-Mormons. One of the mobbers shot and killed his companion, Joseph Standing. One of the mobbers then turned and pointed to Clawson, and said, "Shoot that man!" Clawson coolly faced the mob and folded his arms. He exclaimed, "Shoot!" The mob soon dispersed in the face of Clawson's defiance and willingness to face the mob. He brought the body of his deceased missionary companion back to Salt Lake City, where a public funeral was held in the Tabernacle. Clawson became somewhat of a celebrity for his bravery that day.

August 1882 was a difficult time for Clawson, as he became the first practicing polygamist to be convicted and serve a sentence after the passage of the Edmunds Act. During the trial, one of his wives refused to testify against him. She was put in prison for contempt of court. Judge Charles S. Zane gave Clawson to the maximum sentence possible, 3 1/2 years in prison plus a $1500 fine. For his final words before being sent to prison, Clawson defended his right to practice his religion and challenged the court's ability to enforce a law aimed at destroying a particular establishment of religion in violation of the First Amendment to the United States Constitution. His appeal was heard and rejected by the Supreme Court of the United States in Clawson v. United States. Clawson was pardoned in 1887 by President Grover Cleveland mere months before his sentence was to expire.

Clawson was ordained an apostle and member of the Quorum of the Twelve Apostles on October 10, 1898. He was asked to serve as second counselor in the First Presidency under church president Lorenzo Snow on October 6, 1901, but Snow died just four days later.

In 1904, the town of Kingsville, Emery County, Utah, was renamed Clawson in his honor after he visited the town to organize a ward.

That same year, Clawson secretly contracted a plural marriage with Pearl Udall, daughter of David King Udall and Eliza Stewart Udall. Because they married after then-church president Joseph F. Smith issued a manifesto expressly prohibiting plural marriage among Latter-day Saints, their relationship was a "clandestine marriage of secret meetings and long absences", and they never shared a home. After discussing their marriage across several rendezvous held in the three-month span of October 1912 to January 1913, Clawson "released her [Pearl Udall] from the marriage", and they ceased to live as spouses. Pearl Udall later married Joseph Nelson on September 17, 1919.

In 1921, Clawson became the President of the Quorum of the Twelve Apostles. He served in this position for 22 years, the second-longest tenure for this position in the history of the LDS Church.

== Death ==
Clawson died from pneumonia at the age of 86 in Salt Lake City. He had served in the quorum for a total of 45 years. He was buried at Salt Lake City Cemetery.

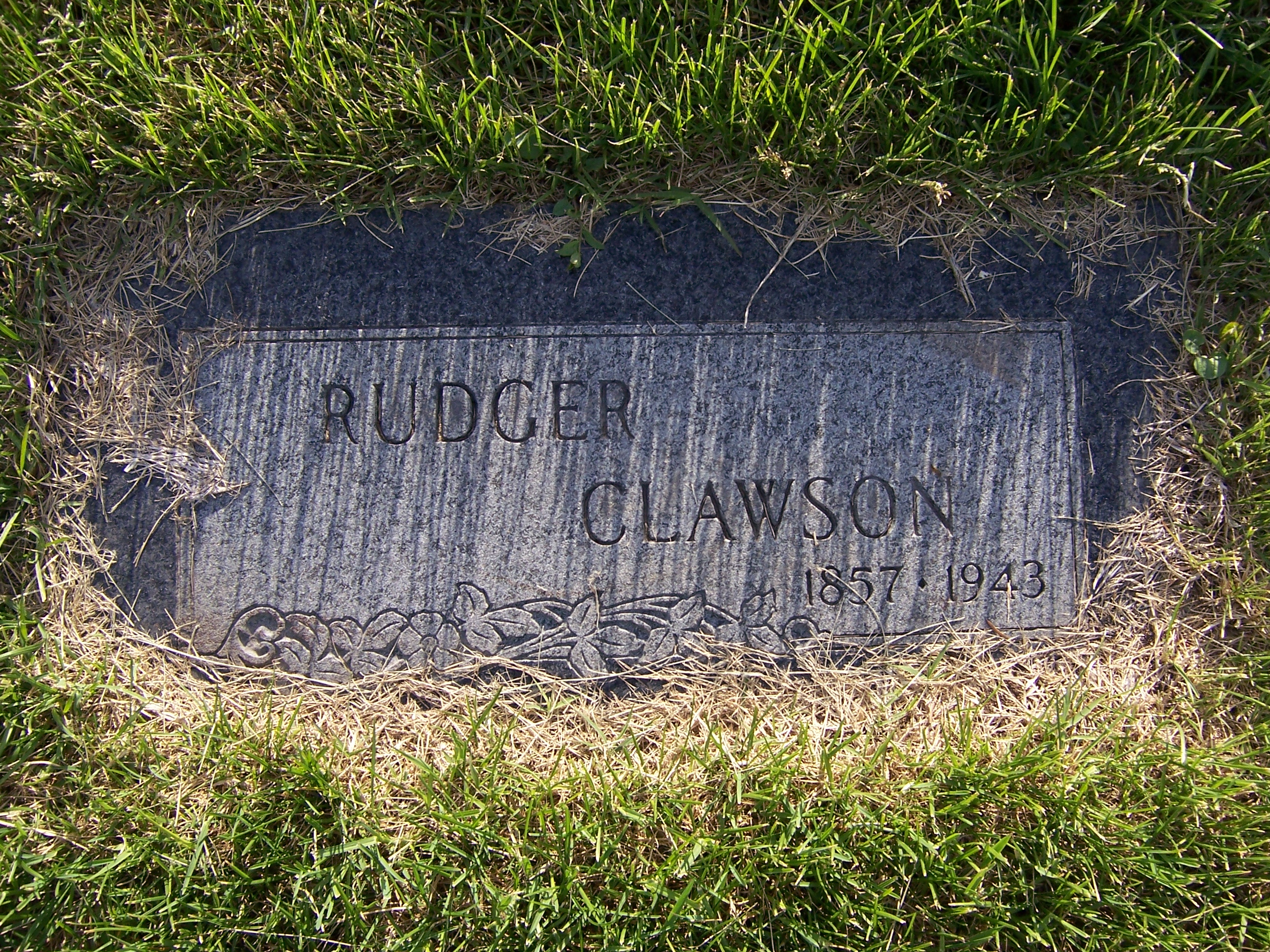
Rudger Clawson's grave marker

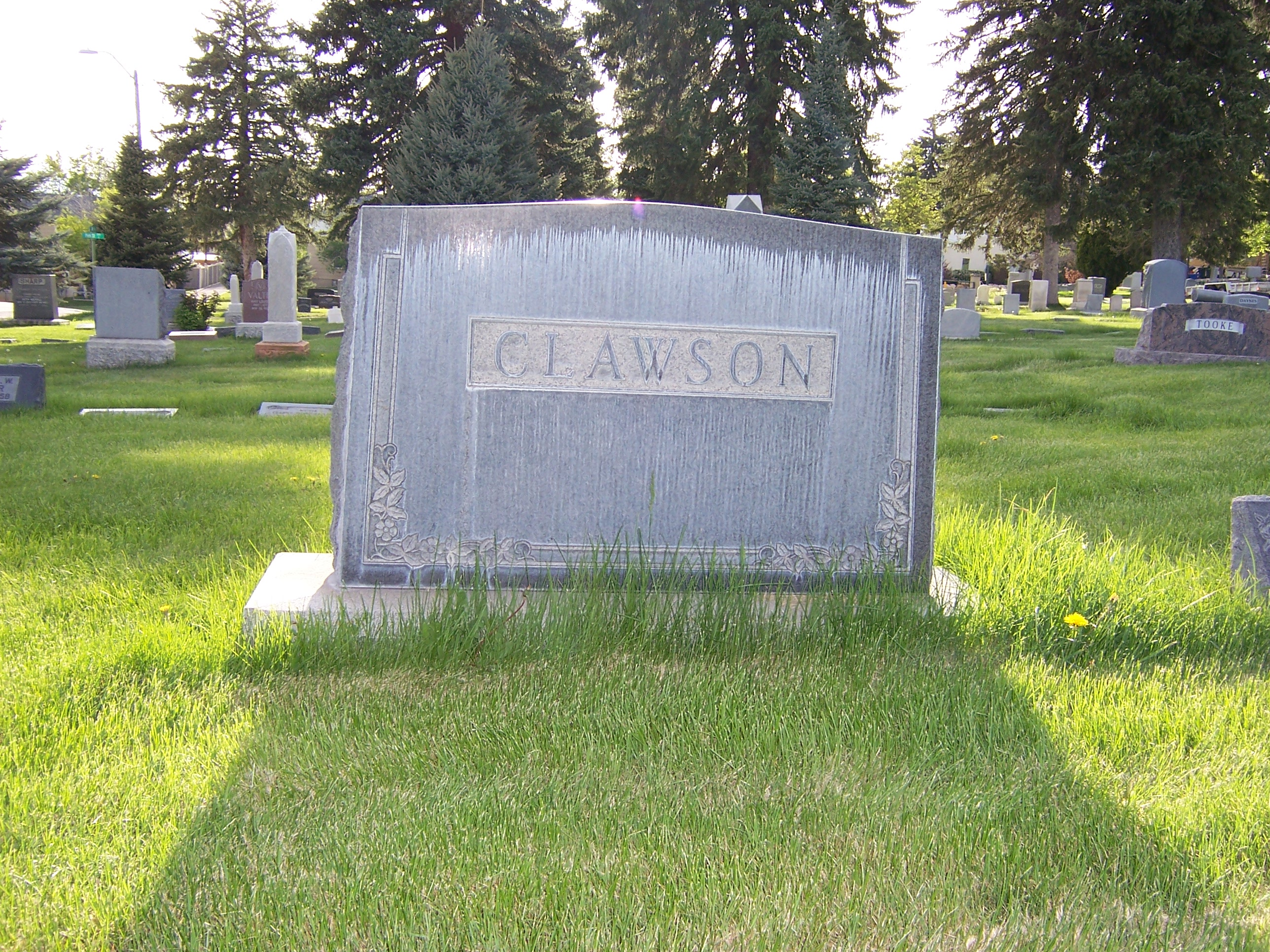
Clawson family grave marker

== Views on race ==
In 1903, the Quorum of the Twelve and First Presidency denied a temple sealing to a man with a black great-grandparent. Clawson recorded that the man was "tainted with negro blood". He later lamented in a meeting that the man's white father of "pure parentage" had brought a curse upon his posterity by marrying a woman with a black grandparent.

== See also ==
- The Church of Jesus Christ of Latter-day Saints in Georgia (U.S. state)
- List of people pardoned or granted clemency by the president of the United States
- Phrenology and the Latter Day Saint Movement

== Published works ==
- Clawson, Rudger (1993a). Larson, Stan (ed.). A Ministry of Meetings: The Apostolic Diaries of Rudger Clawson. Salt Lake City: Signature Books. ISBN 0-941214-96-6. OCLC 25317571.
- —— (1993b). Larson, Stan (ed.). Prisoner for Polygamy: The Memoirs and Letters of Rudger Clawson at the Utah Territorial Penitentiary, 1884-87. Urbana: University of Illinois Press. ISBN 0-252-01861-3. OCLC 23731930.

== External resources ==
- Grampa Bill's GA Pages: Rudger Clawson

The Church of Jesus Christ of Latter-day Saints titles
Preceded by Anthon H. Lund	President of the Quorum of the Twelve Apostles; March 17, 1921 – June 21, 1943	Succeeded by George Albert Smith
New position	Acting President of the Quorum of the Twelve Apostles; For: Anthon H. Lund; November 23, 1918 – March 17, 1921	Vacant Title next held by Joseph Fielding Smith
Preceded by Joseph F. Smith	Second Counselor in the First Presidency; October 6, 1901 – October 10, 1901	Succeeded by Anthon H. Lund
Preceded by Abraham O. Woodruff	Quorum of the Twelve Apostles; October 10, 1901 – June 21, 1943; October 10, 1898 – October 6, 1901	Succeeded by Reed Smoot
