= Mere Mete Whaanga =

- Born: February 15, 1848; Nūhaka, New Zealand.
- Died: May 11, 1944 (aged 96); Salt Lake City, Utah, U.S.
- Resting place: Salt Lake City cemetery
- Known for: LDS Missionary
- Spouse(s): Hirini Whaanga (1869–1905)
- Children: 4
- Parent(s): Hachem Schmidt ("John Smith") and Parapara Kurekure

Mere Mete Whaanga (February 15, 1848 – May 11, 1944) was a pioneer and missionary for the Church of Jesus Christ of Latter-day Saints (LDS Church) in New Zealand. She was a leader of the Maori Ngati Kahungunu tribe and helped to spread the gospel in her area after being baptized by American missionaries. The efforts of her and her husband, Hirini Te Rito Whaanga, hundreds of members of their tribe were baptized. Mere and Hirini became vital to LDS work in the area. She moved to Salt Lake City in 1984, where she stayed until the death of her sister-in-law, besides a year-and-a-half mission back to New Zealand. Mere returned to New Zealand before eventually returning to Salt Lake City to be buried next to her husband. She died on May 11, 1944, at the age of 96.

== Biography ==
Mere was born in Nūhaka, Hawke's Bay, New Zealand, to parents, Hachem Schmidt and Parapara Kurekure. Her name is the Maori pronunciation of "Mary Smith". At 21 years old, Mere married Hirini Te Rito Whaanga, an important leader of the Maori Ngutikahungu tribe. Mere was his third wife as he had been widowed twice before. Together, the couple had three daughters and a son. However, one daughter and their son did not survive past childhood.

=== Conversion ===
In 1884, Mormon missionaries came to Hawke's Bay to share the gospel. Mere was touched by the missionaries' message and convinced her family to meet with them. Her daughters were baptized first, and then Mere and her husband were baptized on November 30 by missionary John C. Stewart. The Whaanga family were some of the first Maori tribe members to be baptized, and they were followed by more than 200 members of their tribe in several weeks.

Hirini and Mere quickly became very involved in church activity and missionary work. They built a rush house specifically for the missionaries, and the Whaanga home became a center for LDS missionary work. Hirini was branch president and Mere often consulted with the missionaries when difficulties arose in communicating with tribe members. She also prioritized missionary work and caring for the missionaries.

=== Move to Utah ===
On May 21, 1894, Hirini and Mere moved to Utah with a group of extended family members, leaving their children and parents in New Zealand. Upon moving, Hirini and Mere ordered that their house in Nūhaka be used as a home for the missionaries. The Whaanga family arrived in Salt Lake City on July 19 after making stops in Gisborne, New Zealand and San Francisco, California. They made quite a spectacle on the streets as both Mere and her sister-in-law had "the traditional blue Maori facial tattoo (moko) on their lips and chins". On the evening of their arrival, a reception was held for the Whaanga family by former New Zealand missionaries. The reception included a dinner and traditional Maori music to make the family feel welcome.

About a week after arriving in Salt Lake, the Whaanga family traveled to Kanab, Utah, which would be the location of their residence. Church leaders recommended Kanab as a better location for the family to live as the climate is not as cold as Salt Lake City in the winter. There Mere's husband planned to raise sheep, which had brought him much success in New Zealand. However, the two returned missionaries that were assigned to help the Whaanga family with their financial affairs mismanaged their money. The church sent leaders to Kanab to review the incident and eventually, the Zion's Maori Association helped Mere and her family relocate to Salt Lake City.

On October 9, 1895, Hirini and Mere were endowed and sealed in the Salt Lake Temple. The couple spent most of their free time doing ordinance work in the temple. After relocating to Salt Lake, Mere learned to write in order to maintain frequent contact with her children and parents back in Nūhaka.

In 1907, only a year and a half after the passing of her husband, Mere returned to New Zealand to serve a full-time mission. She was nearly 60 years old. She returned to America in 1908 after being released from mission duties. Less than a decade later, her sister-in-law died, leaving her without much family in Utah. Mere's grandson and nephew who made the original trek out to Utah back in 1894 both decided to return to New Zealand. As a result, Mere decided to join them.

=== Later years ===
Although she enjoyed being with her family in Nūhaka, Mere had a desire to return to Salt Lake City. Ultimately, she wanted to be buried next to her late husband. After many years of waiting, Mere was issued a visa to return to the United States in 1938.

On November 21, 1938, a reception was held by community members in celebration of her return to Salt Lake. Mere remained active in the LDS Church into her old age. At 95 years old, Mere made a quilt for LDS Church president Heber J. Grant as a birthday gift, however it was in honor of her own birthday and not his.

== Death ==
Mere died on May 11, 1944, at the age of 96. She was buried at the Salt Lake City Cemetery, next to her husband Hirini.
