= Clarence L. Maxwell =

19th-century American gunfighter

Clarence L. Maxwell (1860 – August 23, 1909), known as Gunplay Maxwell, was a late 19th-century Old West gunfighter and businessman from Boston, Massachusetts.

== Early life and family ==
Born the son of a hotel manager, Maxwell was often involved in fights even in his youth. He received a good education, but in 1875 he was involved in a bar room brawl that resulted in his shooting and killing a friend of his. Maxwell fled to Texas, and later Montana, to avoid being arrested for the murder. While in Montana and working as a cowboy, Maxwell began selling his gunman skills during the cattle-sheep wars.

Maxwell married Ada. He later married Bessie Seaman.

== Old West ==
He later became involved in cattle rustling in Wyoming and Utah, resulting in his being arrested and sentenced to three years in the Wyoming State Prison in 1893. While in prison, he became associated with Butch Cassidy, and the two were released within a week of one another. It was later said that he attempted to join Cassidy's gang, but was rejected. As to whether this is true or rumor is not confirmed. In any event, he formed his own gang, but it did not last and by 1898 he was riding alone again.

That year Maxwell and another man robbed the Springville, Utah bank, taking $3,000. More than one hundred posse members pursued them, killing Maxwell's partner, and capturing Maxwell after a brief shootout. He was taken to the Provo, Utah jail, but never revealed the identity of his partner, despite the latter being dead. Most of the money was recovered, either in the possession of the two robbers, or hidden near where the posse caught up to them. Maxwell was convicted of robbery, and he was sent to the Utah State Prison. Five years later, after he helped to stop a prison escape, his sentence was commuted.

While working as a mine guard, Maxwell discovered ozokerite near Colton, Utah, and filed a claim, then started the mining company "Utah Ozokerite Company". The mine soon became the largest known ozokerite mine in the world, and Maxwell opened it to the public. Despite the success of his business venture, Maxwell for unknown reasons moved on, although it is believed he retained ownership of the mine. He surfaced in Goldfield, Nevada, where he worked for mining companies by spying on striking miners. Also while there, he killed a man named Joseph Smith during a dispute, but was not prosecuted. In 1907 he was involved in another gunfight in Utah, with a man named L. C. Reigle. Both were wounded, but neither was killed. Maxwell was initially arrested, but again was not prosecuted.

Later that year, in San Francisco, California, Maxwell married wealthy widow Bessie Hume, with whom he eventually moved to Ogden, Utah. However, by June 1908, Maxwell was again on the move, and while in the company of William M. Walters he robbed a Wells Fargo in Rawhide, Nevada. Both were captured, and released on bail, and were never brought to trial.

On August 23, 1909, Maxwell confronted Deputy Sheriff Edward Black Johnstone in Price, Utah, who had been tasked to stop a possible robbery that Maxwell had been planning. Maxwell also, allegedly, held a grudge against Johnstone due to the deputy having previously identified Maxwell as being a "bad man" and an ex-convict to the sheriff of Goldfield, Nevada. Maxwell confronted Johnstone in the Price Saloon, and informed him that he intended to kill him. The dispute moved them out into the street, where Maxwell drew his pistol and opened fire, but missed. Johnstone returned fire, hitting Maxwell in the elbow and the chest, knocking Maxwell to the ground. Maxwell attempted to fire yet again, but Johnstone fired a third shot, hitting Maxwell in the lung. Maxwell reportedly then said "Don't shoot again Johnstone, you have killed me." Maxwell died shortly thereafter.

When his body was prepared for burial, it was discovered that his arms were covered with track marks, and opium was found in his pocket, giving rise to the suspicion that he had become a drug addict. He was, at the time, going under the name William H. Seaman. He was buried in the Salt Lake City Cemetery. His grave is today unmarked, making its location not certain.
