= Joseph Standing =

American murder victim and missionary

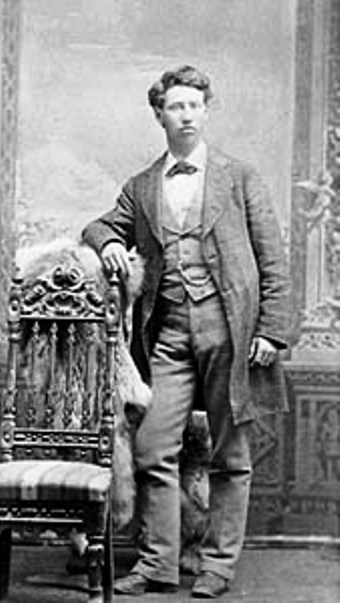
- Standing standing, 1860s or 1870s

Personal details
- Born: Joseph Standing; October 5, 1854; Salt Lake City, Utah Territory, United States
- Died: July 21, 1879 (aged 24); Varnell, Georgia, United States
- Cause of death: Gunshots
- Resting place: Salt Lake City Cemetery; 40.7772°N 111.858°W
- Monuments: 34.9212°N 85.0008°W

Joseph Standing (October 5, 1854 – July 21, 1879) was a missionary for the Church of Jesus Christ of Latter-day Saints (LDS Church) who was killed by a mob near the town of Varnell, Whitfield County, Georgia, in 1879.

== Family ==
Born in Salt Lake City, Utah Territory, and a resident of Box Elder County, Utah, Standing was born to British immigrants James and Mary Standing. He was one of ten children. His father was a stonemason who worked on the Nauvoo and Logan Temples. Prior to his missionary service, Joseph Standing was a fireman with the Wasatch Engine Company. He was not married and had no children.

== Missions ==
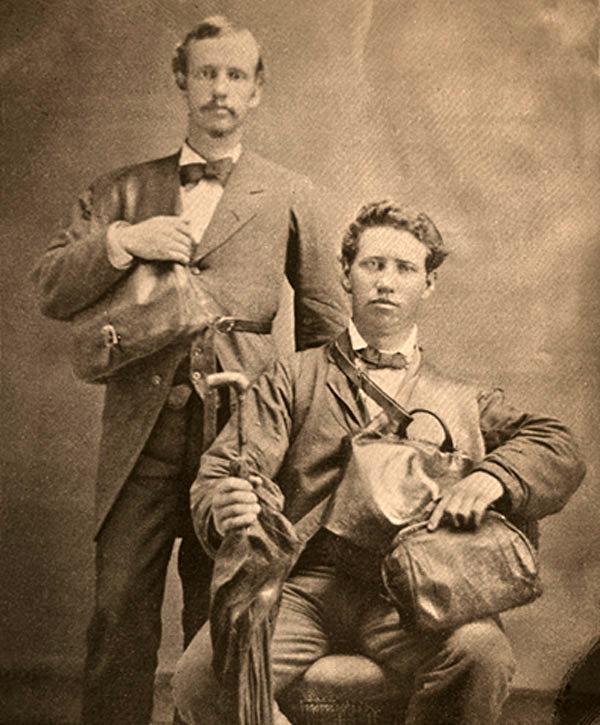
Rudger Clawson and Joseph Standing (sitting) 1879.

Standing's first mission call, in 1875, was to the Eastern United States, where he primarily served in Illinois and Indiana. In March 1878, he was again called to missionary service, this time to the church's Southern States Mission, headquartered in Chattanooga, Tennessee. During an August mission conference in Haywood Valley, Chattooga County, Georgia, Standing, along with fellow missionary Matthias F. Cowley, were sustained as the 'traveling Elders' of the Southern States Mission.

By April 1879, Standing was the presiding Elder of the Georgia Conference, responsible for overseeing all church affairs in the state. That same month, at a general conference of the church in Salt Lake City, 22-year-old Rudger Clawson was called with seven other men to serve in the Southern States Mission. Clawson was assigned by mission president John Hamilton Morgan to be Standing's companion.

Clawson may have been aware of the church's situation in Georgia prior to his arrival. By at least 1876, Standing's letters were periodically published in the Deseret Evening News. One published on April 30, 1878, provides insight into his experiences in the post-Reconstruction South;

A person traveling among the Southern people realizes that though they have been whipped by the North, yet there is a feeling of enmity existing in their bosoms, which only needs a little breeze to inflame their passions to deeds of carnage and strife.

Local opposition to Mormonism increased as Standing and other elders increasingly gained converts in rural areas in North Georgia. Mormon missionaries were seen by some as spiritual carpetbaggers, deceivers who preyed on the poor and uneducated. The majority of those who were baptized into the faith followed the church's council to "gather with the Saints" and left their homes for Mormon settlements in Utah and Colorado.

Joseph Brown, former Georgia Governor (1857–1865) and future U.S. Senator (1880–1891), told the New York Herald;

In traveling through the section about Dalton, embracing particularly the lower part of Chatooga, the upper part of Floyd and Walker, Catoosa and Murray counties, I was astonished to find what a hold the Mormons have on various communities. In each of these counties they have staunch believers and in most of them small congregations. Elders canvas through these counties continually and preach regularly. Every few months they send off bunches of converts for Utah. One of the strangest features of the whole matter is that no one can explain why the Mormon elders have chosen this section for their field of operations. They can be heard of nowhere in Georgia, Alabama or the Carolinas outside of this mountainous area, covering a dozen or so counties. It may be because these counties are off the railroad, comparatively inaccessible and inhabited in certain localities by uneducated people.

As the threat of violence toward Mormons increased, Standing sent a letter to Georgia Governor Alfred H. Colquitt on June 12, 1879, briefly outlining the activities of armed mobs in Whitfield County and requesting assistance.

I am fully aware dear Sir, that the popular prejudice is very much against the Mormons, and that there are minor officers who have apparently winked at the condition of affairs above referred to. But I also am aware that the laws of Georgia are strictly opposed to all lawlessness and extend to her citizens the right of Worshipping God according the dictates of conscience. . . A word or line from the Governor would undoubtedly have the desired effect. Ministers of the Gospel could then travel without fear of being stoned or shot and the houses of the Saints would not be entered into in defiance of all good law and order.

Through his secretary J. W. Warren, Governor Colquitt replied;

The Governor directs me to say that your statement is entirely correct. . . Under the provisions of our State Constitution, the reformation of religious faith, or of opinion on any subject, cannot legitimately be the object of legislation, and no human authority can interfere with the right to worship God according to the requirements of conscience. So long as the conduct of men shall conform to the law, they cannot be molested, and, even for non-conformity thereto, they cannot be interfered with only as the law may direct. . . The Governor regrets to hear the report you give from Whitfield County. He will instruct the State Prosecuting Attorney for the District to inquire into the matter, and if the report be true, to prosecute the offenders.

== Mobbing and death ==
On July 21, 1879, Standing and Clawson were leaving Varnell for Rome, Georgia (approximately 57 miles (92 km) south of Varnell) when they were accosted by an armed mob of a dozen men. Most were on foot; at least three were on horseback. When Standing asked by what authority they were stopped on a public road, one member of the mob reportedly told them;

The government of the United States is against you, and there is no law in Georgia for Mormons.

The mob led them into woods and stopped at a spring. It does not appear that it was the intention of all in the mob to kill them. James Faucett told them; "I want you men to understand that I am the captain of this party, and that if we ever again find you in this part of the country we will hang you by the neck like dogs." According to Clawson, after an hour of "desultory conversation… of which the vilest accusations were laid against the "Mormons," [and] the beastly talk of the mobbers," three men who had left on horseback returned and directed Standing and Clawson to go with them.

Although it is not clear where they intended to take them, all accounts agree that Standing resisted by turning towards the mob and in a loud voice commanded them to "Surrender." When he made this declaration he was holding a pistol a member of the mob had left unguarded on a nearby tree stump. In response, Standing was immediately shot in forehead "directly above the nose". Another member of the mob then pointed to Clawson and said "Shoot that man." Clawson folded his arms and said "Shoot." Although he appeared calm and maintained composure, he nearly passed out in the anxiety of the moment. For reasons unknown, the same man who moments ago told the mob to shoot Clawson now said "Don't shoot." As Clawson examined Standing, one man said; "This is terrible; that he should have killed himself in such a manner," claiming that Standing accidentally shot himself "while bringing his weapon into position."

Clawson convinced the group that he should leave for help to remove Standing's body. He contacted Henry Holston, two miles (3 km) away, and Holston agreed to go to the site of the incident and look after Standing's body while Clawson rode a horse to Catoosa Springs to contact the coroner (approximately 8 miles (13 km) from Holston's home). Before returning with the coroner, Clawson sent the following telegram to Governor Colquitt in Atlanta; "Joseph Standing was shot and killed to-day, near Varnell's, by a mob of ten or twelve men." He sent the same message to John Hamilton Morgan in Salt Lake City with the additional line; "Will leave for home with the body at once, Notify his family."

When they reached the spring, the mob had dispersed and a crowd of spectators were gathered around Standing's body. The body now had more than 20 bullet wounds in the face and neck. It is believed this was done by the mob to protect the original shooter from conviction by having each man participate in the crime. Following the shooting the Atlanta Constitution called Standing "fat and beardless, and with not a very bright look, judging from his picture" and reported that those in the community became "alarmed for fear some member of their family might fall a victim to the seductive arguments and pleadings of the young Mormon[s]… [their] services were regularly attended by those who every week became more and more inoculated with the pernicious creed." In spite of this perception Clawson told a reporter he believed the actions of the mob were not in harmony with the sentiments of the general population.

== Funeral ==
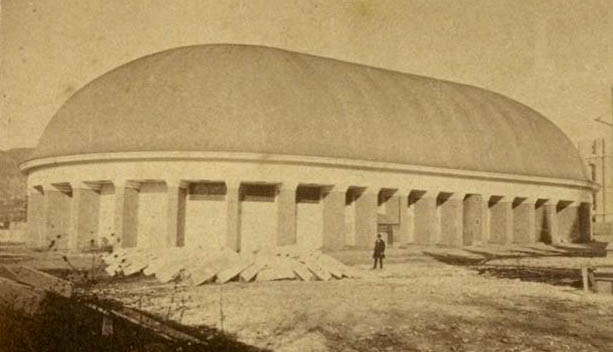
Salt Lake Tabernacle, 1870s.

Clawson accompanied Standing's body back to Utah by train and funeral services were held in the Salt Lake Tabernacle on Sunday, August 3, 1879. Speakers included John Taylor and George Q. Cannon. Approximately 10,000 attended the service. Transcripts of Taylor and Cannon's remarks were published in the Deseret News and later in the multi-volume Journal of Discourses. Standing was buried at Salt Lake City Cemetery.

== Trial ==
On August 1, 1879, eleven days after the shooting, Governor Colquitt offered a $500.00 reward for "the capture of the murders of the Mormon elder" accompanying the thirteen warrants for arrest issued by the local Sheriff. Andrew Bradley, Jasper P. Nations, and Hugh Blair were indicted by a grand jury for first degree murder and riot.

Accompanied by John Morgan, Clawson returned to Dalton, Georgia for the trial in October. Henry Holston, Mary Hamlin, and Jonathan Owensby testified in behalf of the prosecution. The latter two interacted with the mob while Standing and Clawson were in the mob's custody prior to the shooting. Numerous witnesses testified for the defense, and it was widely understood that most of them were lying. On October 19, three days after the trial began, the accused were acquitted of murder. On October 29 the Deseret News reported that the accused had also been acquitted of "riot."

The Atlanta Constitution reported that seven of the twelve men were Christians and at least one a member in good standing in a local church. John Morgan wrote to the paper; "If these men are Christians; if they and their advisers and abettors are to be admitted into the city that "lieth four square," we beg the privilege of locating in the other place, as we think it much preferable." The paper replied;

We agree with Elder Morgan in his sentiments about the pious "Christians," recognized members and communicants of churches who imbrue their hands in the blood of innocence and mutilate the dead. If heaven is to be their place of abode in the great hereafter region, we shall prefer a home in another region, where murders cannot enter and hypocrites find no rest.

== Standing's legacy ==
The story of Standing's murder lived on in the life of Rudger Clawson. In 1898, Clawson was appointed to the church's Quorum of the Twelve Apostles, the second highest ecclesiastical body in the church, a position he held until his death in 1943. Clawson's high profile life in Utah, and among Mormons generally, gave opportunity for commentators to look to the events in his life that may have shaped his faith in a God and his commitment to the church. He was regularly asked to tell the story of Standing's death, and references were made to the event by church leaders in conferences of the church for decades. The story of Rudger Clawson can not be separated from the story of Standing.

In 1880, the Young Men's Mutual Improvement Association of Salt Lake City placed a monument of Italian marble over Standing's grave in the Salt Lake City Cemetery. By the 1980s, the obelisk had cracked in half and rested beside the grave. It was replaced in 2001 with a new marker, a replica of the original, including iron fencing around the base. The text on the south side of the monument was written by Orson F. Whitney.

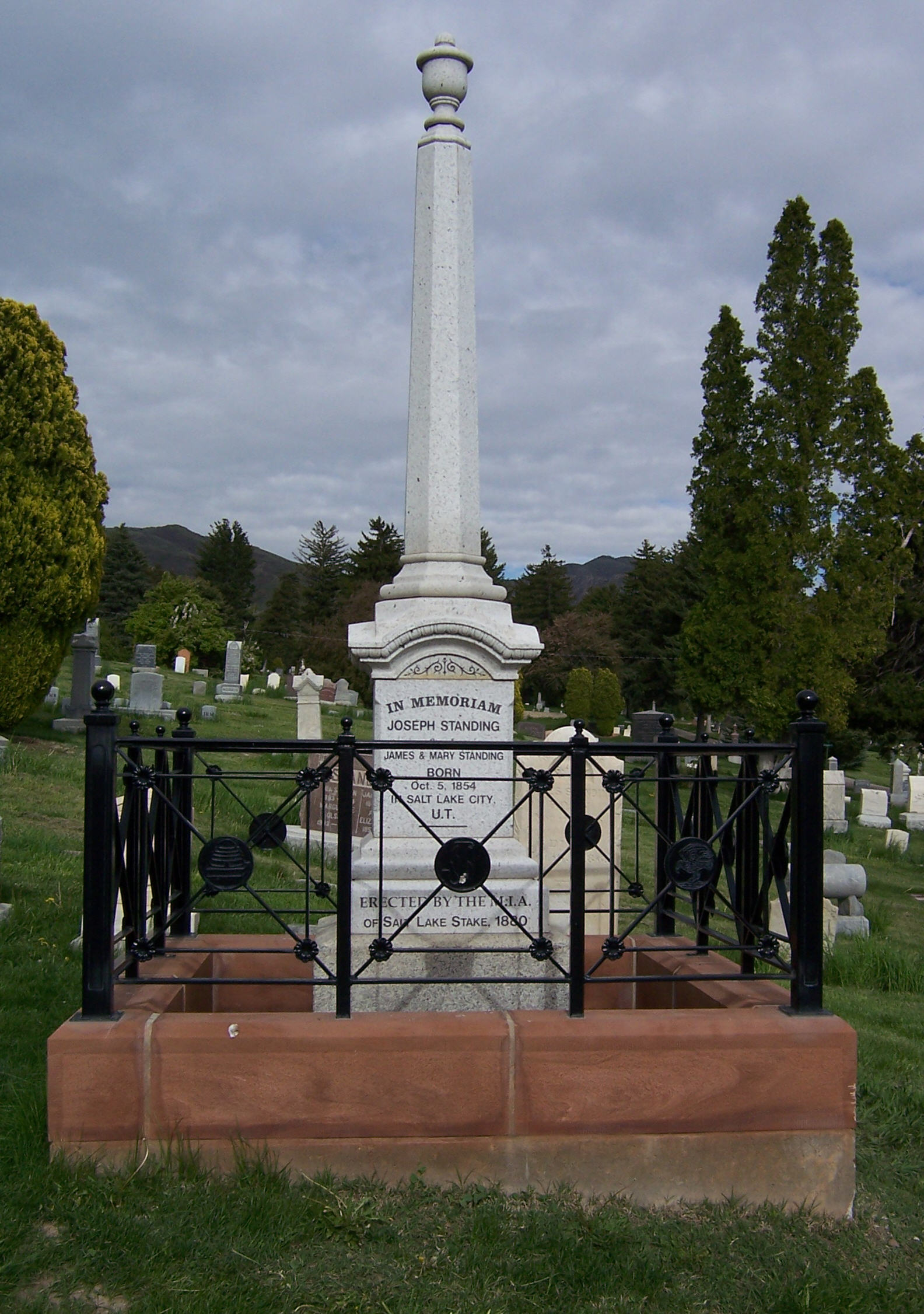
West View

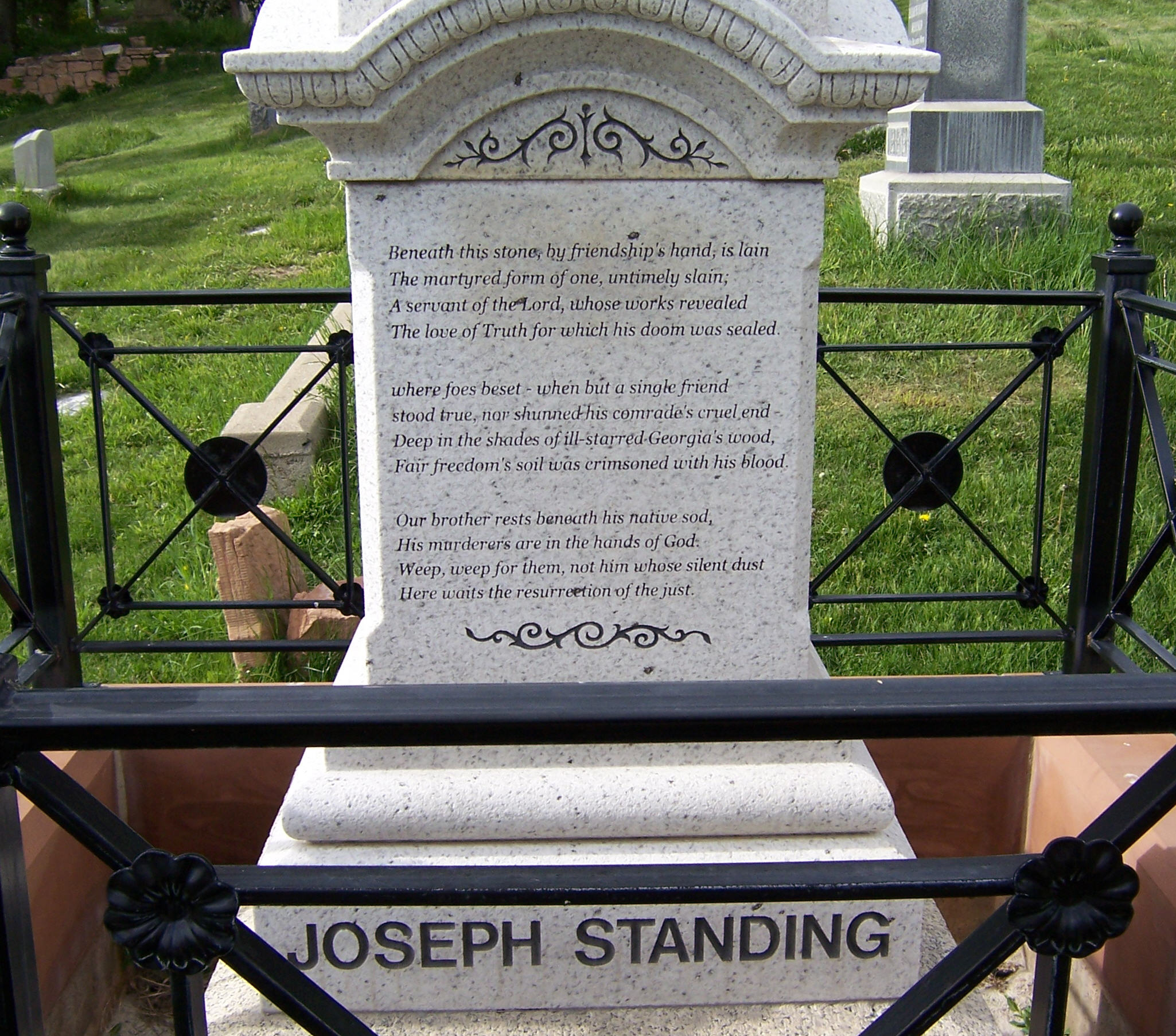
South View

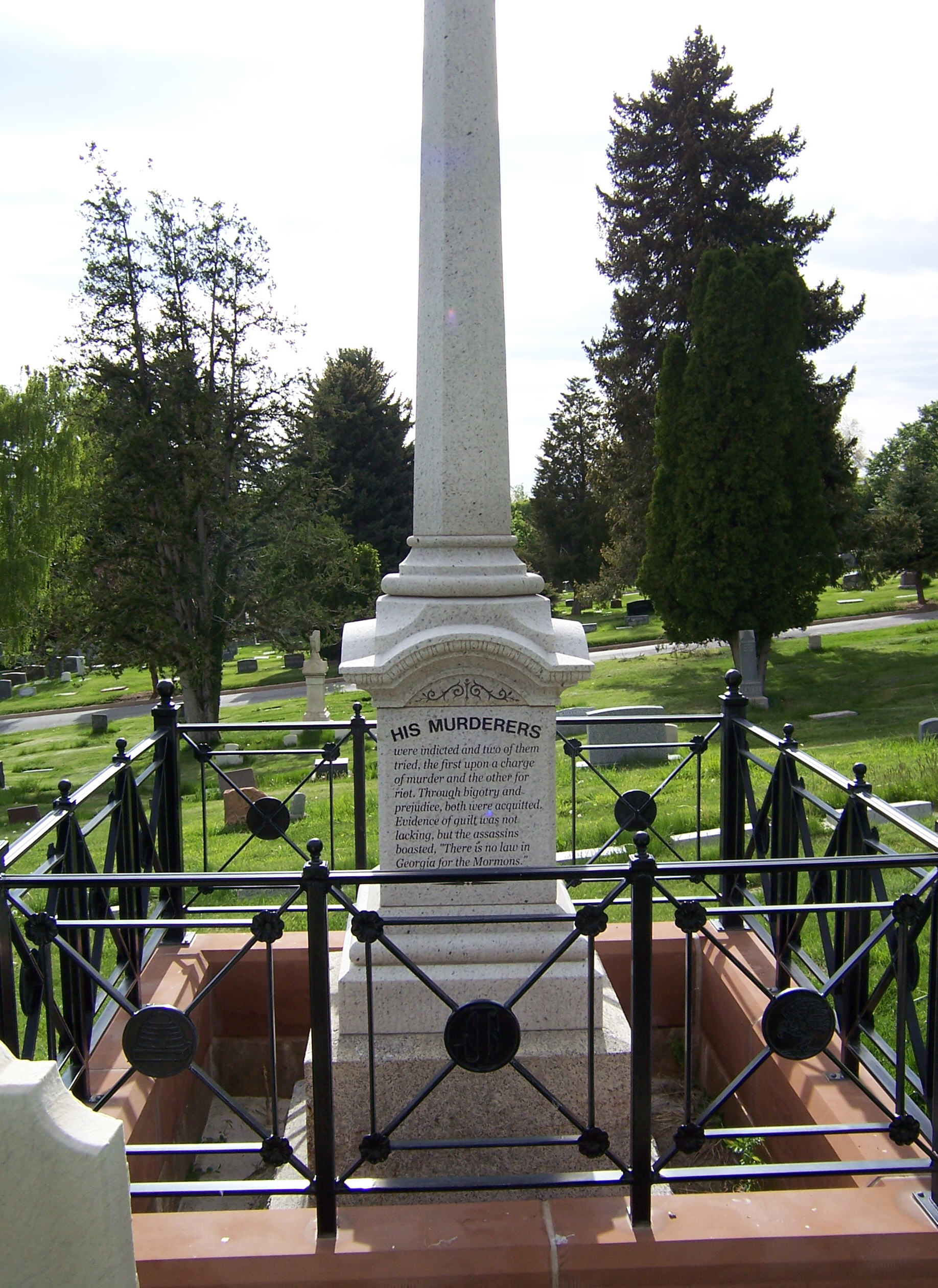
East View

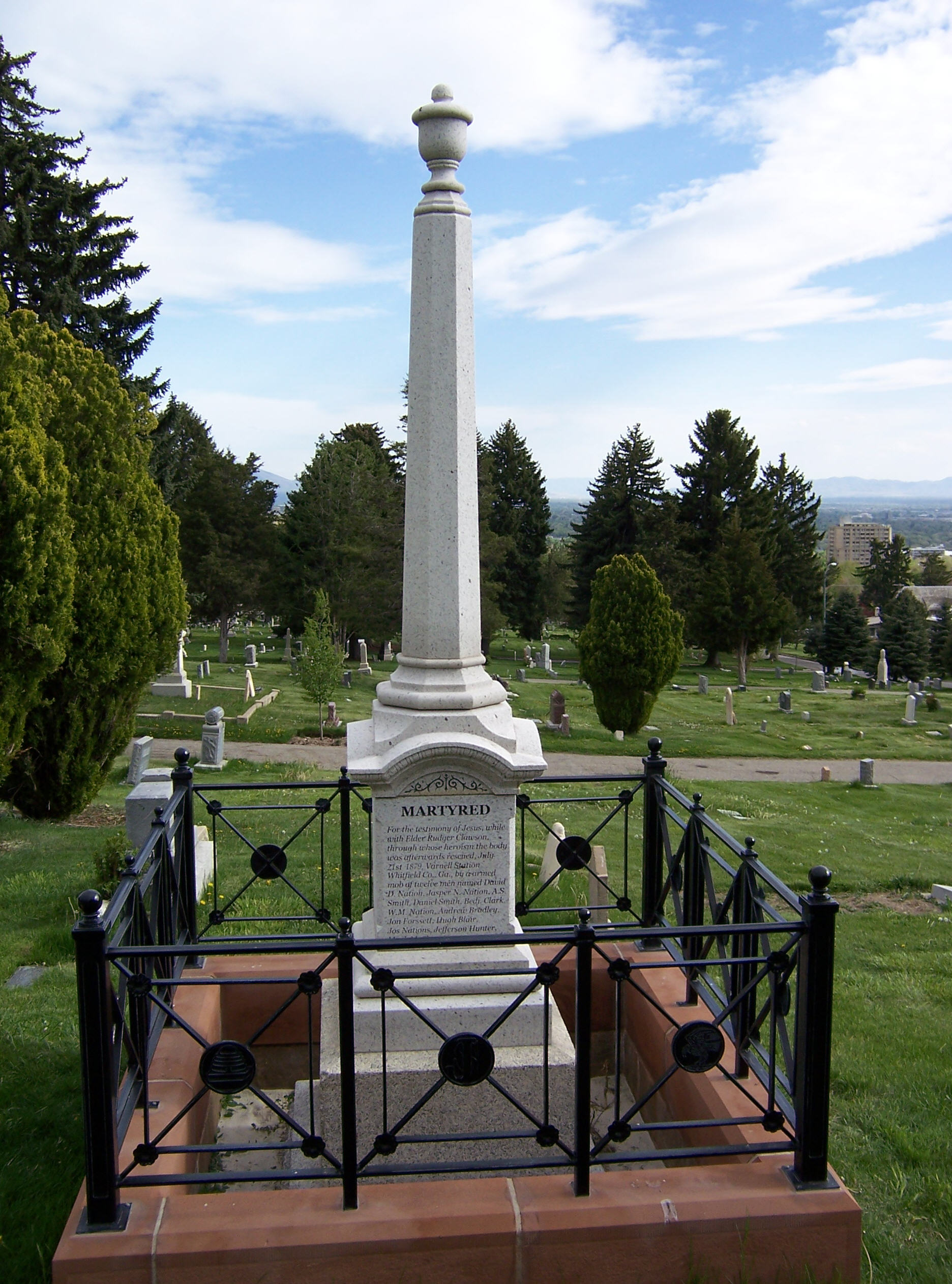
North View

(West View)

IN MEMORIAM Joseph Standing Son of James and Mary Standing. Born Oct. 5, 1854 in Salt Lake City U.T. (Utah Territory) Erected by the M.I.A. of Salt Lake Stake 1880

(South View)

Beneath this stone, by friendship's hand is lain
The martyred form of one, untimely slain;
A servant of the Lord, whose works revealed
The love of Truth for which his doom was sealed.

where foes beset-when but a single friend
stood true, nor shunned his comrade's cruel end
Deep in the shades of ill-starred Georgia's wood,
Fair freedom's soil was crimsoned with his blood.

Our brother rests beneath his native sod,
His murderers are in the hands of God.
Weep, weep for them, not him whose silent dust
Here waits the resurrection of the just.

(East View)

MARTYRED For the testimony of Jesus, while with Elder Rudger Clawson, through whose heroism the body was afterwards rescued, July 21st, 1879, Varnell Station Whitfield Co. Ga. by a [sic] armed mob of twelve men named David D. Nation, Jasper N. Nation, A.S. Smith, Daniel Smith, Bedj. Clark, W.M. Nation, Andrew Bradley, Jon Forssett, Hugh Blair, Jos Nations, Jefferson Hunter, Mark McClure

(North View)

HIS MURDERERS were indicted and two of them tried, the first upon a charge of murder and the other for riot. Through bigotry and prejudice, both were acquitted. Evidence of guilt was not lacking, but the assassins boasted, "There is no law in Georgia for the Mormons."

== Joseph Standing monument ==
On May 3, 1952 church president David O. McKay dedicated a monument at the site of Standing's murder in Whitfield County, Georgia. The 0.68-acre (2,800 m^{2}) lot was donated to the church by W. C. Puryear and the road leading to the monument was named Standing Road. The property is maintained by the church and open to the public.

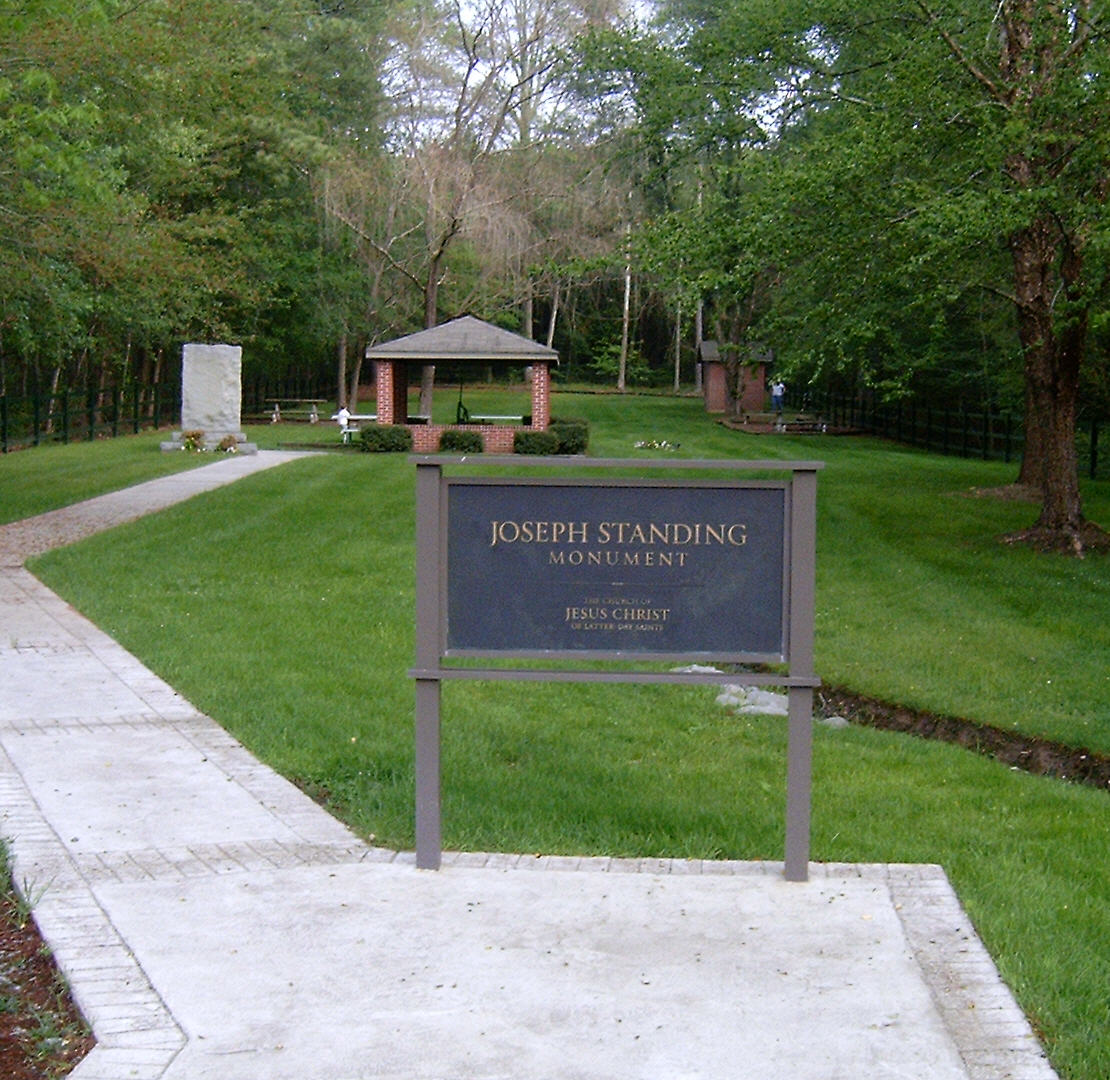
Joseph Standing Monument

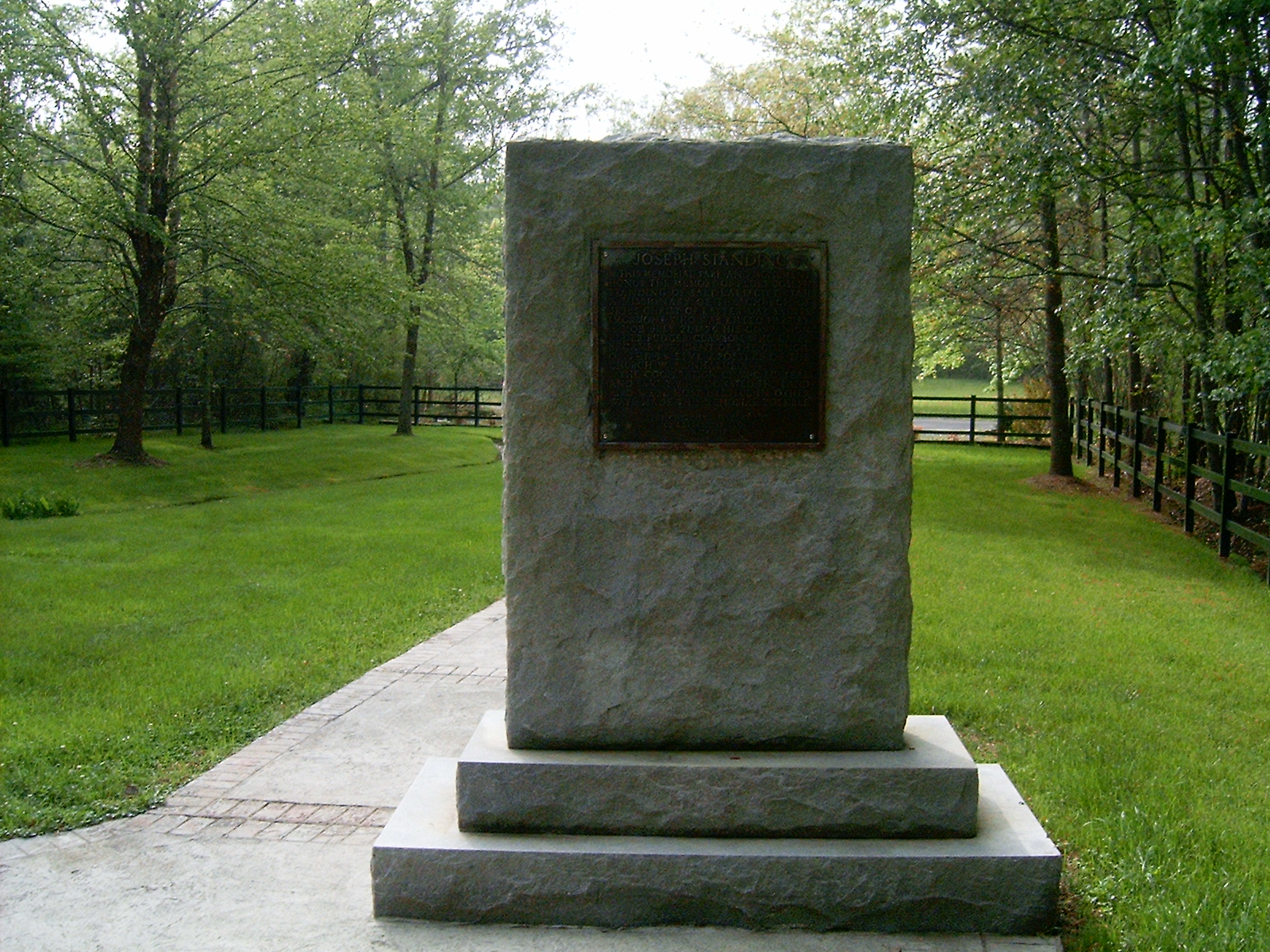

This Memorial Park and monument honor the memory of Elder Joseph Standing of Salt Lake City, Utah, a missionary of the Church of Jesus Christ of Latter-day Saints, (Mormon) who was killed here by a mob July 21, 1879. His companion, Elder Rudger Clawson who later became president of the Council of the Twelve Apostles of the Church was unharmed. The cooperation of W. C. Puryear and family who donated the land and were most helpful in other ways, made this memorial possible.

One of the dormitories at the church's Missionary Training Center in Provo, Utah, is named in honor of Joseph Standing.

In May 1978, a Latter-day Saint congregation was organized in Dalton, Georgia, 12 miles (19 km) south of Varnell.

== See also ==
- Latter Day Saint martyrs
- The Church of Jesus Christ of Latter-day Saints in Georgia (U.S. state)
