= Atlanta Georgia Temple =

Temple of the LDS church

- Located in Sandy Springs, Georgia, the Atlanta Georgia Temple was the first LDS Temple in the Southeastern United States
- Interactive map of Atlanta Georgia Temple
- Number: 21
- Dedication: June 1, 1983, by Gordon B. Hinckley
- Site: 9.6 acres (3.9 ha)
- Floor area: 34,500 ft^{2} (3,210 m^{2})
- Height: 93 ft (28 m)
- Official website • News & images

Church chronology
← Jordan River Utah Temple	Atlanta Georgia Temple	→ Apia Samoa Temple

Additional information
- Announced: April 2, 1980, by Spencer W. Kimball
- Groundbreaking: March 7, 1981, by Spencer W. Kimball
- Open house: May 3–21, 1983; April 9–23, 2011
- Rededicated: November 14, 1997, by Gordon B. Hinckley; May 1, 2011, by Thomas S. Monson
- Current president: Marion Keith Giddens (2024)
- Designed by: Emil B. Fetzer
- Location: Sandy Springs, Georgia, United States
- Coordinates: 33°55′54.24239″N 84°21′44.77319″W
- Exterior finish: Pre-cast stone walls
- Baptistries: 1
- Ordinance rooms: 4 (two-stage progressive)
- Sealing rooms: 5
- Notes: The rededication in 1997 was for the addition of a new baptistry, two new sealing rooms, and remodeling. In April 2009, the church announced that the Atlanta Temple would close on July 1 for 15 to 18 months for renovations The temple was rededicated by Thomas S. Monson on May 1, 2011

The Atlanta Georgia Temple (formerly the Atlanta Temple) of the Church of Jesus Christ of Latter-day Saints (LDS Church) was the first temple built by the church in the Southeastern United States and the second temple east of the Mississippi River since 1846. Members of the church consider it a literal "house of God" comparable to the ancient Israelite temple where, as recorded in the Bible, God spoke with Samuel. Emphasizing this belief, the building's façade bears the inscription "Holiness to the Lord – The House of the Lord."

The announcement to build a temple in Georgia was made by the church's First Presidency in April 1980. A site for the temple was selected on a 13-acre (53,000 m^{2}) lot in Fulton County, in the then-unincorporated city of Sandy Springs, between Barfield Road on the east and Glenridge Drive on the west, 3.5 miles (5.6 km) north of Atlanta.

== Ground breaking and construction ==
Ground breaking ceremonies were held on March 7, 1981, with church president Spencer W. Kimball presiding. An estimated 10,000 spectators were in attendance.

Special guests at the ground breaking included Georgia Governor George Busbee, Georgia Speaker of the House Tom Murphy, Joe Frank Harris, United States Senators Jake Garn and Paula Hawkins, United States Congressman Elliott Levitas, State Senators Nathan Dean, Joe Thompson, Joe Burton, and Wayne Garner, State Representatives Bill Cummings and Doug Vandiford, and Fulton County Commissioner Michael Lomax.

In his remarks at the groundbreaking, Busbee commented on the high emphasis Latter-day Saints place on education within the family and the positive impact the temple would have on the state;

I wish more Georgians placed such importance in the moral aspects of this life, for only through a common responsibility for our neighbor’s well-being can we insure that our state will be a better place for our children to live.

And we are all taking a big step toward that goal on this beautiful hillside today as we break ground on what will soon be the first Mormon Temple in the entire Southern United States.

The building contract was awarded to Cube Construction, Inc. and over the next two years the property was developed to include the temple, an annex (including facilities for grounds keepers), a clothing distribution center, and a small apartment building for missionaries and other out-of-state temple workers. In 1988 the property was further developed to include a meetinghouse (chapel) for regular Sunday worship and other church activities.

The Atlanta Temple was the first of seven smaller temples built in the early 1980s. Its dimensions were smaller than previous temples and the original designs did not include a spire. However, at a regional meeting held in Tucker, Georgia, on January 10, 1982, church architect Emil B. Fetzer announced the addition of a spire including a 10-foot-6-inch (3.20 m) statue of the angel Moroni.

== Dedication ==
The Atlanta Temple was dedicated in services held on June 1–4, 1983, by Gordon B. Hinckley. It was the first of over 90 temples he dedicated.

In the dedicatory prayer, Hinckley affirmed the sacred nature of the temple in these words:

May all who enter its portals realize that they are entering Thy house as Thy guest, and conduct themselves always with reverence and respect and love for Thee.

May all who enter these holy precincts feel of Thy spirit and be bathed in its marvelous, sanctifying influence... May they come with clean hands and pure hearts and in a spirit of love and dedication. May their minds be lifted above the mundane affairs of the world to a higher and more heavenly plane. May any spirit of selfishness or unkindness or evil whose influence may affect them in the world, leave them when they enter the doors of this sacred and holy sanctuary…

May the very presence of this temple in the midst of Thy people become a reminder of sacred and eternal covenants made with Thee. May they strive more diligently to banish from their lives those elements which are inconsistent with the covenants they have made with Thee. Wilt Thou bless them, dear Father, with peace in their hearts and peace in their homes.”

On November 14, 1997, Hinckley rededicated the temple after significant renovations to the interior and the addition of an expanded baptistry.

== Service ==
Latter-day Saints consider it a sacred privilege to serve in the temple. With the exception of a small staff of grounds keepers, maintenance engineers, office workers, and security, all other temple workers, including sealers, serve in a volunteer capacity.

Prior to the construction Latter-day Saints in the South traveled to either the Washington D.C. Temple or to other temples throughout the United States to be married, sealed to children or parents, receive blessings collectively known as the Endowment, or perform ordinances on behalf of deceased ancestors.

The original area served by the temple included approximately 150,000 Latter-day Saints encompassing the states of Georgia, Florida, Alabama, Mississippi, Tennessee, South Carolina, and portions of North Carolina, Louisiana, and Arkansas.

Until the dedication of the Orlando Florida Temple in October 1994 members of the church in the Caribbean also came to the Atlanta Temple. During the first decade of the Atlanta Temple's operation it was not unusual for Latter-day Saints from Venezuela and other South American countries to come to the Atlanta Temple (Flights to Atlanta were often cheaper than those to Mexico City, Lima, Peru, or Guatemala City where the church dedicated temples in the early 1980s. Temples were dedicated in Bogotá, Colombia in April 1999 and Caracas Venezuela in August 2000).

Between 1983 and 2000 bus loads of worshipers came to the Atlanta Temple from across the South every weekend, sometimes staying in the temple all day Friday and again on Saturday. It became the spiritual hub for Latter-day Saints in the region. As of October 2015, the temple district area serves 124 congregations in Georgia, 11 in Tennessee, and nine in Alabama.

== Additional temples in the South ==
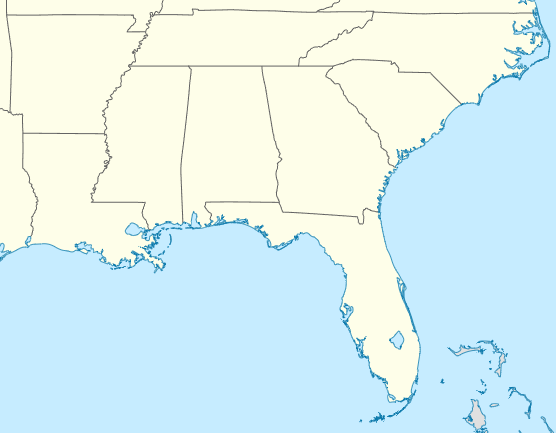
Temples in the Southeastern United States
- = Operating
- = Under construction
- = Announced
- = Temporarily Closed

On October 4, 1997, Hinckley announced that due to increasing church membership in the United States and around the world, the need to build smaller temples closer to the people had reached a critical mass. The leadership of the church wanted to make “every ordinance performed in the house of the Lord” available to those who sought them, without the previous restraints of distance and the expense of travel.

As a direct result of this announcement, between 1999 and 2000, temples were dedicated in every state in the original Atlanta Temple district, except Arkansas and Mississippi. This dramatically decreased the number of out of state visitors to the temple.

== Remodeling ==
The First Presidency announced on April 4, 2009, that the temple would close on July 1, 2009, for 15–18 months of renovations. Changes as part of the remodeling included making the temple more accessible to those with special needs. Additional windows were added, as well as more art and art glass. Among the new works of art is a mural in the creation room by Linda Curley Christensen. When construction was completed, a public open house was held from April 9 through April 23, 2011. The temple was rededicated on May 1, 2011, by church president Thomas S. Monson. In 2012, the LDS Church opposed a proposal to rename Barfield Road to Mercedes-Benz Drive when Mercedes-Benz developed the adjacent land for their USA headquarters.

== See also ==
- Comparison of temples (LDS Church)
- List of temples (LDS Church)
- List of temples by geographic region (LDS Church)
- Temple architecture (LDS Church)
- The Church of Jesus Christ of Latter-day Saints in Georgia
