= Salt Lake City Cemetery =

Cemetery in Salt Lake City, Utah, U.S.

Coordinates: 40°46′38″N 111°51′32″W

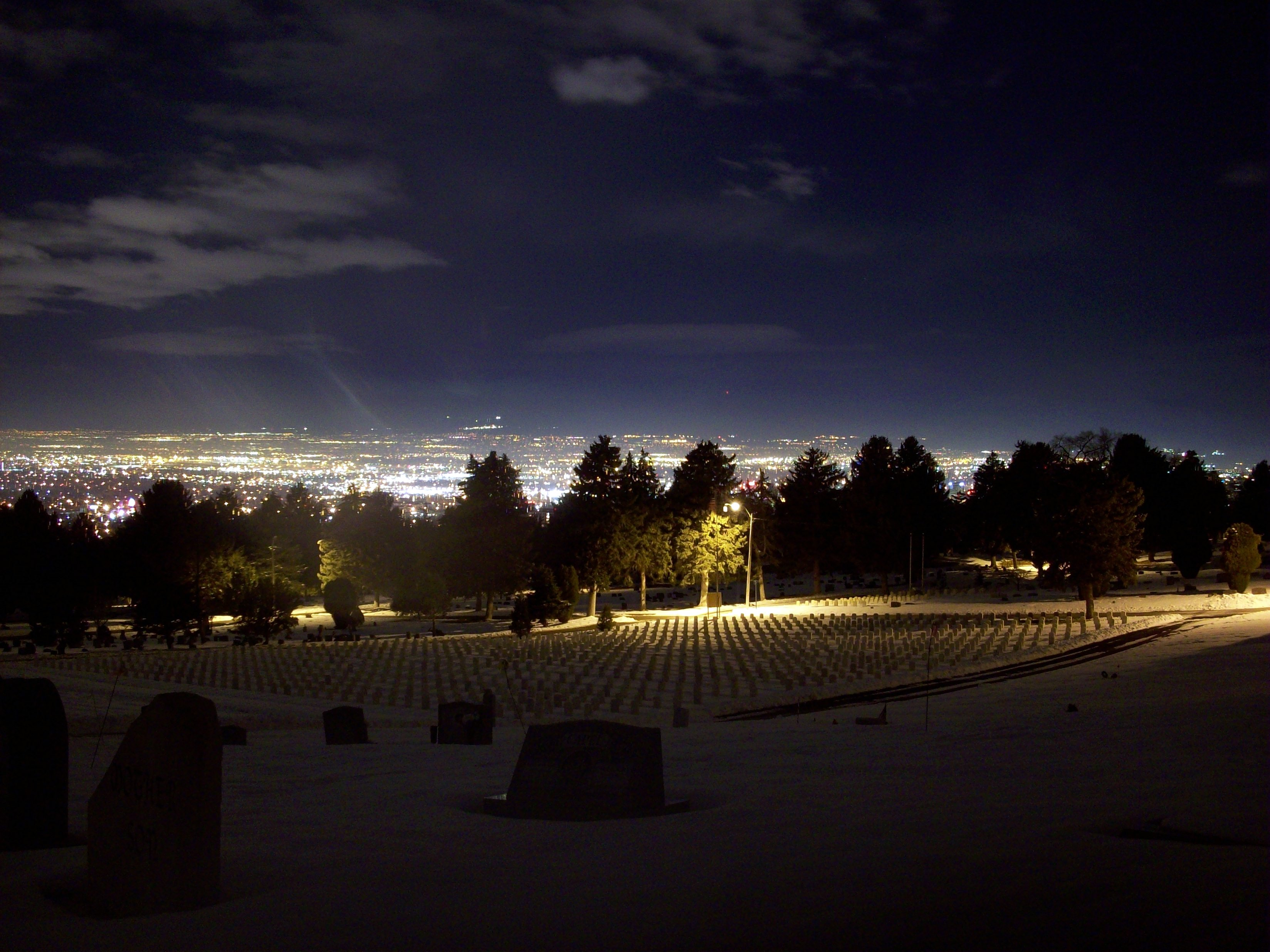
- The northern section of the cemetery at night, looking towards Salt Lake City
- Interactive map of Salt Lake City Cemetery

Details
- Location: Salt Lake City, Utah
- Country: United States
- Owned by: Salt Lake City Public Lands Department

The Salt Lake City Cemetery is a cemetery in northeastern Salt Lake City, Utah, United States, that is one of the largest city-operated cemeteries in the United States.

== Description ==
The cemetery is located north of 4th Avenue and east of N Street in The Avenues neighborhood of Salt Lake City. Approximately 120,000 persons are buried in the cemetery. Many religious leaders and politicians, particularly many leaders of the Church of Jesus Christ of Latter-day Saints (LDS Church) lie in the cemetery. It covers over 150 acres (0.61 km^{2}) and contains 9 1/2 miles of roads.

== History ==
The first burial occurred on September 27, 1848, when George Wallace buried his child, Mary Wallace. In 1849, George Wallace, Daniel H. Wells, and Joseph Heywood surveyed 20 acres (81,000 m^{2}) at the same site for the area's burial grounds. In 1851, Salt Lake City was incorporated and the 20 acres (81,000 m^{2}) officially became the Salt Lake City Cemetery with George Wallace as its first sexton.

The cemetery contains one British Commonwealth war grave, of a Canadian Army soldier of World War I.

== See also ==
- List of burials at Salt Lake City Cemetery
