= List of United States political families (U) =

The following is an alphabetical list of political families in the United States whose last name begins with U.

== The Udalls ==
The Udalls are a politically notable family in the West. Despite having many Republican politicians in the family, most that have risen to national prominence have been Democrats. They are also related to the Lee–Hamblin family.

- David King Udall (1851–1938), member of the Arizona Territory Legislature 1899. Father of John Hunt Udall, Levi Stewart Udall, Jesse Addison Udall, and Don Taylor Udall.
  - Levi Stewart Udall (1891–1960), Arizona Supreme Court Justice 1946–60.
    - Stewart Udall (1920–2010) served as a United States representative from Arizona 1955–61 and also as Secretary of the Interior 1961–69.
      - Tom Udall (born 1948), Stewart's son, was a U.S. representative from New Mexico 1999–2009 and United States Senator from New Mexico 2009–21. He was also the U.S. ambassador to New Zealand and Samoa 2021/2022–25
    - Mo Udall (1922–1998), Stewart's brother, also served as U.S. representative from Arizona 1961–91 and ran for the Democratic nomination for President of the United States in 1976.
      - Mark Udall (born 1950), Mo's son, served as a U.S. representative from Colorado 1999–2009 and as United States Senator from Colorado 2009–15.
    - Gordon Harold Smith (born 1952) was a U.S. Senator from Oregon 1997–2009; He is a Republican. His mother was a Udall and he is a second cousin and half-second cousin to both Mark and Tom Udall.
    - Milan Smith (born 1942), Judge of the United States Court of Appeals for the Ninth Circuit 2006–present. Brother of Gordon Harold Smith.
  - John Hunt Udall (1889–1959) was Mayor of Phoenix, Arizona 1936–38. He was half-uncle of Mo and Stewart Udall.
    - Nick Udall (1913–2005), John's son was Mayor of Phoenix 1948–52.
  - Jesse Addison Udall (1893–1980), Attorney of Graham County, Arizona; Arizona State Representative 1931–38; Judge of the Arizona Superior Court 1939–42 1953–58; Justice of the Arizona Supreme Court 1960–72. Son of David King Udall.
  - Don Taylor Udall (1897–1976), Arizona State Representative 1941–42. Son of David King Udall.
  - Rex E. Lee (1935–1996), U.S. Solicitor General (1981–1985), first cousin of Mo and Stewart Udall, first cousin once removed of Tom Udall, Mark Udall, and Gordon Smith.

NOTE: David King Udall was also brother-in-law of Utah Territory Representative William Thomas Stewart and grandson-in-law of California Assemblyman Jefferson Hunt. Udall's third wife, Mary Ann Morgan, was also widow of Utah Territory Representative John Hamilton Morgan. Levi Stewart Udall and Jesse Addison Udall were also grandsons-in-law of Utah Territory Representative John D. Lee. Tom Udall, Mark Udall, and Gordon Harold Smith are also second cousins of U.S. Senator Mike Lee and Utah Supreme Court Justice Thomas Rex Lee, who are sons of Rex E. Lee.

== The Umsteads ==
- John W. Umstead, member of the North Carolina Legislature. Father of William B. Umstead.
  - William B. Umstead (1895–1954), U.S. representative from North Carolina 1933–39, Chairman of the North Carolina Democratic Party 1945, U.S. Senator from North Carolina 1946–48, delegate to the Democratic National Convention 1948, Governor of North Carolina 1953–54. Son of John W. Umstead.

NOTE: William B. Umstead was also distant cousin of U.S. Senator Isaac S. Pennybacker, U.S. Representative Green Berry Samuels, and Pennsylvania Governor Samuel W. Pennypacker.

== The Underwoods ==
- Joseph R. Underwood (1791–1876), Kentucky State Representative 1816–19 1825–26 1846 1861–63, candidate for Lieutenant Governor of Kentucky 1828, Judge of Kentucky Court of Appeals 1828–35, U.S. representative from Kentucky 1835–43, U.S. Senator from Kentucky 1847–53. Brother of Warner L. Underwood.
- Warner L. Underwood (1808–1872), Attorney General in Texas, Kentucky State Representative 1848, Kentucky State Senator 1849–53, U.S. representative from Kentucky 1855–59, U.S. Consul in Glasgow, Scotland 1862–64. Brother of Joseph R. Underwood.
  - John C. Underwood (1840–1913), Lieutenant Governor of Kentucky 1875–79. Son of Joseph R. Underwood.
    - Oscar Underwood (1862–1929), U.S. representative from Alabama 1895–96 1897–1915, candidate for Vice President of the United States 1912, U.S. Senator from Alabama 1915–27, candidate for President of the United States 1924. Grandson of Joseph R. Underwood.

== The Uphams ==
- Jabez Upham (1764–1811), Massachusetts State Representative 1804–06 1811, U.S. representative from Massachusetts 1807–10. Brother of George B. Upham.
- George B. Upham (1768–1848), Solicitor of Cheshire County, New Hampshire 1796–1804; U.S. representative from New Hampshire 1801–03; New Hampshire State Representative 1804–13 1815; New Hampshire State Senator 1814. Brother of Jabez Upham.
- Charles Wentworth Upham (1802–1875), Massachusetts State Representative 1840–49 1859–60, U.S. representative from Massachusetts 1853–55. Cousin of Jabez Upham and George B. Upham.
  - James P. Upham, New Hampshire State Representative 1865–66. Son of George B. Upham.

== The Upshurs ==
- Littleton Upshur, Virginia House Delegate 1809. Father of Abel P. Upshur.
  - Abel P. Upshur (1790–1844), Virginia House Delegate 1812–13 1824–27, Virginia State Court Judge 1826–41, delegate to the Virginia Constitutional Convention 1829 1830, U.S. Secretary of the Navy 1841–43, U.S. Secretary of State 1843–44. Son of Littleton Upshur.

== The Upsons ==
- Daniel Upson (1786–1863), Ohio State Senator 1836–38. Father of William H. Upson.
  - William H. Upson (1823–1910), Ohio State Senator 1853–55, delegate to the Republican National Convention 1864 1876, U.S. representative from Ohio 1869–73, Justice of the Ohio Supreme Court 1883–84, Circuit Court Judge in Ohio 1884–94. Son of Daniel Upson.
    - Charles Upson (1821–1885), Clerk of St. Joseph County, Michigan 1848–49; Michigan State Senator 1855–56 1880; Attorney General of Michigan 1861–62; U.S. representative from Michigan 1863–69; Circuit Court Judge in Michigan 1869–72; Mayor of Coldwater, Michigan 1877. Second cousin twice removed of Daniel Upson.
    - Harvey Washington Upson (1823–1896), Indiana State Representative 1865. Second cousin twice removed of Daniel Upson.
    - Gad E. Upson (1823–1866), candidate for U.S. Congressional Delegate from Montana Territory 1865. Second cousin twice removed of Daniel Upson.
    - Andrew S. Upson (1835–1911), delegate to the Republican National Convention 1880, Connecticut State Senator 1880–82. Second cousin twice removed of Daniel Upson.
      - William Hazlett Upson, delegate to the Republican National Convention 1956. Grandson of William H. Upson.
      - James W. Upson (1848–1915), New York Assemblyman 1889. Second cousin thrice removed of Daniel Upson.

== The Uptons ==
- Richard Upton (1915–1996), New Hampshire State Representative 1940 1946 1949, delegate to the New Hampshire Constitutional Convention 1964 1984, delegate to the Republican National Convention 1988. Father of Robert W. Upton.
  - Robert W. Upton (1884–1972), New Hampshire State Representative 1911, delegate to the New Hampshire Constitutional Convention 1918 1930 1938 1948, Vice Chairman of the New Hampshire Republican Party 1939 1957, delegate to the Republican National Convention 1940 1944 1948 1956 1960, U.S. Senator from New Hampshire 1953–54. Son of Richard Upton.

== The Utters ==
- George H. Utter (1854–1912), Lieutenant Governor of Rhode Island 1904–05, Governor of Rhode Island 1905–07, U.S. representative from Rhode Island 1911–12. Father of G. Benjamin Utter.
  - G. Benjamin Utter, Rhode Island Republican Committeeman 1915–28, Rhode Island State Representative 1925–26. Son of George H. Utter.

== The Utterbacks ==
- John G. Utterback (1872–1955), Bangor, Maine Councilman 1912–13; Bangor, Maine Alderman 1913–14; Mayor of Bangor, Maine 1914–15; delegate to the Democratic National Convention 1932; U.S. representative from Maine 1933–35; U.S. Marshal of Maine 1935–44. Cousin of Hubert Utterback.
- Hubert Utterback (1880–1942), Des Moines, Iowa Police Court Judge 1912–14; Judge in Iowa 1915–27; Chairman of the Iowa Legislative Committee 1925–27; Justice of the Iowa Supreme Court 1932–33; U.S. representative from Iowa 1935–37; candidate for U.S. Senate from Iowa 1936; Democratic National Committeeman 1937–40. Cousin of John G. Utterback.
