= Udall (disambiguation) =

Udall is an American political family.

Udall may also refer to:

== Members of the Udall political family ==
- Brady Udall (fl. 2010s), American author
- David King Udall (1851–1938), American politician and Mormon pioneer
- Don Taylor Udall (1897–1976), former state representative in Arizona
- Ella Stewart Udall (1855–1937), first telegraph operator in the Arizona Territory
- Jesse Addison Udall (1893–1980), former Chief Justice of the Arizona Supreme Court
- John Hunt Udall (1889–1959), former mayor of Phoenix, Arizona
- John Nicholas Udall (1913–2005), former mayor of Phoenix, Arizona, and Superior Court judge
- Levi Stewart Udall (1891–1960), former Chief Justice of the Arizona Supreme Court
- Mark Udall (born 1950), former U.S. Senator from Colorado
- Michelle Udall (fl. 2010s), member of the Arizona House of Representatives
- Mo Udall (1922–1998), former U.S. Representative from Arizona
- Stewart Udall (1920–2010), former U.S. Representative from Arizona and Secretary of the Interior
- Tom Udall (born 1948), former U.S. Senator from New Mexico

== Other people ==
- Ephraim Udall (died 1647), English Royalist divine
- Nicholas Udall (1504–1556), English playwright
- Richard Athil Udall (1811–1883), American politician

== Places ==
- Udall, Kansas, U.S.
- Udall, Missouri, U.S.
- Point Udall (Guam), the westernmost point in the U.S.
- Point Udall (U.S. Virgin Islands), the easternmost point in the U.S.

== Other uses ==
- Morris K. Udall and Stewart L. Udall Foundation, an Executive Branch office of the U.S. Government
- Melvin Udall, a character in the movie As Good as It Gets, played by Jack Nicholson

== See also ==
- Udal (surname)
- Uldall
