= John Udall =

John Udall may refer to:

- John Udall (Puritan) (1560?–1592), English clergyman
- John Hunt Udall (1889–1959), mayor of Phoenix, Arizona, 1936–1938
- John Nicholas Udall (1913–2005), mayor of Phoenix, Arizona, 1948–1952, and son of John Hunt Udall

== See also ==
- John Oliver Udal (1926–2022), district commissioner in Anglo-Egyptian Sudan
- John Udal (judge) (1848–1925), English-born cricketer, antiquarian, author, lawyer and judge
- John Udell (1795–1874), American farmer and Baptist lay preacher
