= John Udal =

John Udal may refer to:

- John Oliver Udal, district commissioner in Anglo-Egyptian Sudan
- John Udal (judge) (1848–1925), English-born cricketer, antiquarian, author, lawyer and judge

== See also ==
- John Udall (Puritan) (1560?–1592), English clergyman
- John Hunt Udall (1889–1959), mayor of Phoenix, Arizona from 1936 to 1938
- John Udell (1795–1874), American farmer and Baptist lay preacher
