= Jefferson Hunt =

American politician

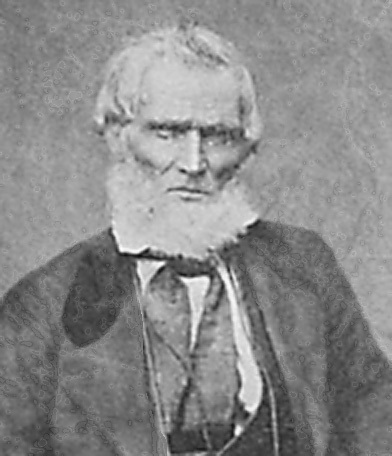

Member of the California State Assembly for the 1st district
- In office January 1, 1855 – January 4, 1858

Member of the Utah Territorial Legislative Assembly for the Weber district
- In office December 14, 1863 – January 22, 1864

Member of the General Assembly of Deseret for the Iron district
- In office January 6, 1851 – April 4, 1851

Personal details
- Born: January 20, 1803 Bracken County, Kentucky, US
- Died: May 11, 1879 (aged 76) Oxford, Idaho, US
- Party: Whig, Democratic
- Spouse(s): Celia Mounts; Matilda Nease

Jefferson Hunt (January 20, 1803 – May 11, 1879) was a U.S. western pioneer, soldier, and politician. He was a captain in the Mormon Battalion, brigadier general in the California State Militia, a California State Assemblyman, and a representative to the Utah Territorial Legislature.

== Early years ==
Hunt was born to John Hunt and Martha Jenkins on January 20, 1803, in Bracken County, Kentucky. Some sources cite his full name as Charles Jefferson Hunt, while others cite it as Jefferson David Hunt.

He married Celia Mounts in December 1823. In 1834 they both converted to the Church of Jesus Christ of Latter-day Saints and were baptized on March 7, 1835.

== Mormon migration ==
The family, which then included six children, started their migration with the Mormons to Far West, Missouri, in 1837. Other sources say they had moved to Clay County, Missouri first before going to Far West. It took the Hunts four weeks to make this journey. Jefferson Hunt was later called as an Assistant Marshall along with George M. Hinkle.

The family moved again with the Mormons to Illinois where they settled twenty miles outside of Nauvoo, Illinois. He served as a major in the Nauvoo Legion. Soon after he was ordained to the office of High Priest and later became an early participant in plural marriage when he married Matilda Nease.

== Mormon Battalion ==
In 1846, while encamped at Council Bluffs, Iowa, he joined the Mormon Battalion, which was formed at the request of the U.S. government for participation in the Mexican–American War.

He was commissioned as a Captain, and was placed in command of Company A. Two of his sons also enlisted, and served under his command.

He temporarily commanded the entire battalion when its commander died, until a replacement arrived.

During the Mormon Battalion's journey Hunt's company made the first known gesture of peace between Mexico and the United States in what was called "The Exchange at the Presidio". The exchange took place very close to what is today Tucson, Arizona. This event is commemorated with a statue in downtown Tucson. The statue was dedicated in 1996 by Gordon B. Hinckley, then President of The Church of Jesus Christ of Latter-Day Saints.

His entire family journeyed with the battalion as they completed what may be the longest march in U.S. military history, ending in San Diego, California.

== California expeditions ==
After being discharged from the Mormon Battalion, Hunt and his family settled in Salt Lake City, Utah, in 1847.

Soon thereafter, Hunt proposed traveling back to California to bring food and supplies for other recent Utah arrivals. Mormon authorities approved this proposal, and Hunt undertook this journey with Porter Rockwell, several former Mormon Battalion members, and two of his own sons.

Later he guided several parties of gold prospectors from Utah to California. One of the groups he led to California became impatient at his slow progress, and many of the party members elected to abandon Hunt's group, and follow their own route to California. They became the infamous Death Valley '49ers. Those staying with Hunt made the journey without serious incident.

On his way to California in 1851, Hunt was elected to represent Iron County in the legislature of the State of Deseret. He was not a resident of Iron County, but he happened to pass through the county as elections were held, and he was chosen by the locals.

== California years ==
In 1851 he was called by his church to help create a Mormon colony in San Bernardino, California. This colony was the first American settlement in California after Statehood.

In that settlement he organized the building of Fort San Bernardino which was the largest log fort ever built in California history.

From 1853 to 1857 he served as a member of the California State Assembly. Elected to represent Los Angeles County, he introduced legislation in his first year in office to create San Bernardino County, which passed. Upon the creation of San Bernardino County he became the county's first Assemblyman. He is honored as the "Father of San Bernardino County", which is the largest county in the contiguous United States.

In 1856 he was appointed as a brigadier general in the California State Militia.

== Later years ==
In 1860 he founded the town of Huntsville, Utah. He served as a representative to the Utah Territorial Legislature in 1863, representing Weber County.

He died in 1879 in Oxford, Idaho.

== Legacy ==
Jefferson Hunt is the namesake of Huntsville, Utah.

Hunt has a number of noteworthy descendants:

- John Hunt Udall, great-grandson, Mayor of Phoenix, Arizona
- Jesse Addison Udall, great-grandson, Chief Justice of the Arizona Supreme Court
- Don Taylor Udall, great-grandson, Arizona State Legislator
- Nick Udall, 2nd great-grandson, Mayor of Phoenix, Arizona
- Gordon Harold Smith, 3rd great-grandson, U.S. Senator from Oregon
- Milan Dale Smith Jr., 3rd great-grandson, Federal Judge, U.S. 9th Circuit

== See also ==
- Udall family

Political offices
Preceded by Ignacio Del Valle, Andrés Pico	California State Assemblyman, 2nd District; 1853–1854 (with J. P. McFarland)	Succeeded by Pedro C. Carillo,
Preceded by Charles P. Noell	California State Assemblyman, 1st District); 1854–1858	Succeeded by Isaac W. Smith
