= USS Oxford (APA-189) =

Attack transport ship in United States Navy

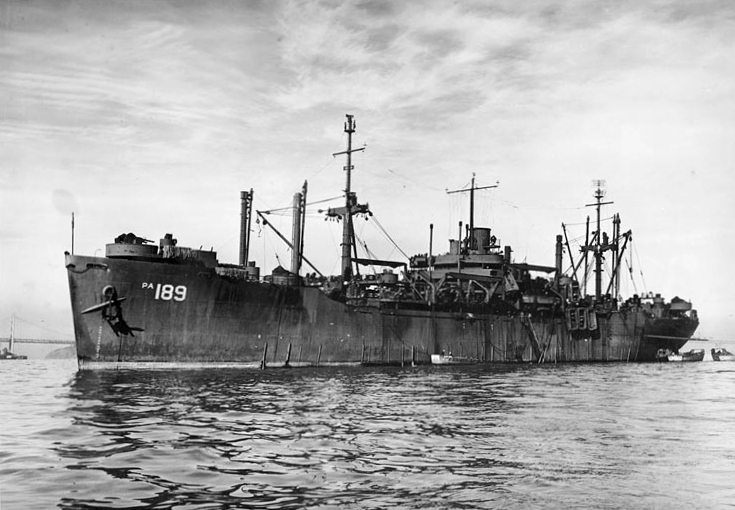
- USS Oxford (APA-189) in San Francisco Bay, late 1945 or early 1946

History

United States
- Namesake: Oxford, Alabama; Oxford, Arkansas; Oxford, Colorado; Oxford, Connecticut; Oxford, Florida; Oxford, Georgia; Oxford, Idaho; Oxford, Indiana; Oxford, Iowa; Oxford, Kansas; Oxford County, Maine; Oxford, Maryland; Oxford, Massachusetts; Oxford, Michigan; Oxford, Mississippi; Oxford, Nebraska; Oxford, New Jersey; Oxford, New York; Oxford, North Carolina; Oxford, Ohio; Oxford, Pennsylvania; Oxford, West Virginia; Oxford, Wisconsin
- Ordered: as type VC2-S-AP5; MCV Hull 657
- Laid down: 17 April 1944
- Launched: 12 July 1944
- Commissioned: 11 September 1944
- Decommissioned: 17 April 1946
- Stricken: 1 May 1946
- Fate: Scrapped, 1974

General characteristics
- Displacement: 12,450 tons (full load)
- Length: 455 ft 0 in (138.68 m)
- Beam: 62 ft 0 in (18.90 m)
- Draught: 24 ft 0 in (7.32 m)
- Speed: 19 knots
- Capacity: 150,000 cu. ft, 2,900 tons
- Complement: 56 Officers 480 Enlisted
- Armament: one 5 in (130 mm) gun mount, twelve 40 mm gun mounts, ten 20 mm gun mounts

USS Oxford (APA-189) was a Haskell-class attack transport acquired by the U.S. Navy during World War II for the task of transporting troops to and from combat areas.

== World War II service ==
The first ship to be named Oxford by the Navy, APA–189 was laid down 17 April 1944 as M.C. Hull 657 by Kaiser Shipbuilding Co., Vancouver, Washington; launched 12 July; underwent trials prior to acceptance by the Navy; and commissioned 11 September at the Naval Station, Astoria, Oregon.

After a brief fitting out period and shakedown in the Seattle, Washington, and San Diego, California, areas, Oxford embarked 1,478 troops at San Francisco, California, and steamed for the Southwest Pacific Ocean 26 October 1944. She arrived Finschhafen, New Guinea 12 November, and then operated between Hollandia and Noumea, New Caledonia, as well as between Florida Island and Mantis Island.

=== Landing troops and their equipment in the Philippines ===
Oxford participated in landing operations in Lingayen Gulf, Luzon, Philippine Islands, 11–13 January 1945 as a unit of task group TG 77.9. She then continued to transport troops between Leyte, Manus, and Wakde Islands. She also provided troop transport services during the initial landings at Okinawa 1–5 April, after which she steamed to Guam, to Pearl Harbor, and finally to San Francisco, California, arriving 11 May to embark replacement troops.

One week later she again steamed for the Southwest Pacific, this time to the Carolines, the Philippines, New Guinea, and Eniwetok, which she reached 22 July. On the 24th, she departed in company with three other ships for San Francisco, but two days out she had to put in at Midway Island to repack her stern tube. She then steamed independently for San Francisco 29 July but, en route was diverted to San Pedro, California, where she tied up the second week of August.

=== End-of-war operations ===
After voyage repairs at Todd Shipyard, San Pedro, and assumption of command by Captain J. C. Goodnough, Oxford called at both San Diego, California, and San Francisco. She departed 23 August for Eniwetok with U.S. Army replacement troops. After calls at Ulithi, Manila, Subic Bay, and Japanese ports, Oxford returned to San Francisco in late November.

== Post-war decommissioning ==
In January 1946 Oxford was released from the naval service for postwar disposal. Assigned to Commander, 5th Naval District, she arrived Norfolk, Virginia, 26 February, decommissioned 17 April, was redelivered to War Shipping Administration (WSA) the next day, and was struck from the Navy List 1 May and scrapped in 1974.

== Military awards and honors ==
Oxford received two battle stars for World War II service.
