= Udal =

Udal may refer to the following topics:

== Film ==
- Udal (film) - 2022 Indian Malayalam language film

== Legal ==
- Udal law - Legal system of Shetland and Orkney

== Locations ==
- Kampong Bukit Udal - A village named after a nearby hill, Bukit Udal
- The Udal, archaeological site on North Uist, Scotland

== People ==
- Udal of Mahoba - Rajput warrior
- Udal (politician) - Indian state politician

== See also ==
- Udal (surname), includes list of people with 'Udal' as their surname
