= Arnold Creek =

Arnold Creek may refer to:

== Streams ==
- Arnold Creek (Georgia), a tributary of the Little River (Withlacoochee River)
- Arnold Creek (Huntington Creek tributary), a tributary of Huntington Creek in Luzerne County, Pennsylvania
- Arnold Creek (Indiana), a tributary of the Ohio River
- Arnold Creek (Texas), a tributary of Indian Creek in the East Fork Trinity River watershed
- Arnold Creek (West Virginia), a tributary of Middle Island Creek

== Others ==
- Arnold Creek, Portland, Oregon, a neighborhood
