= Arnold Creek (West Virginia) =

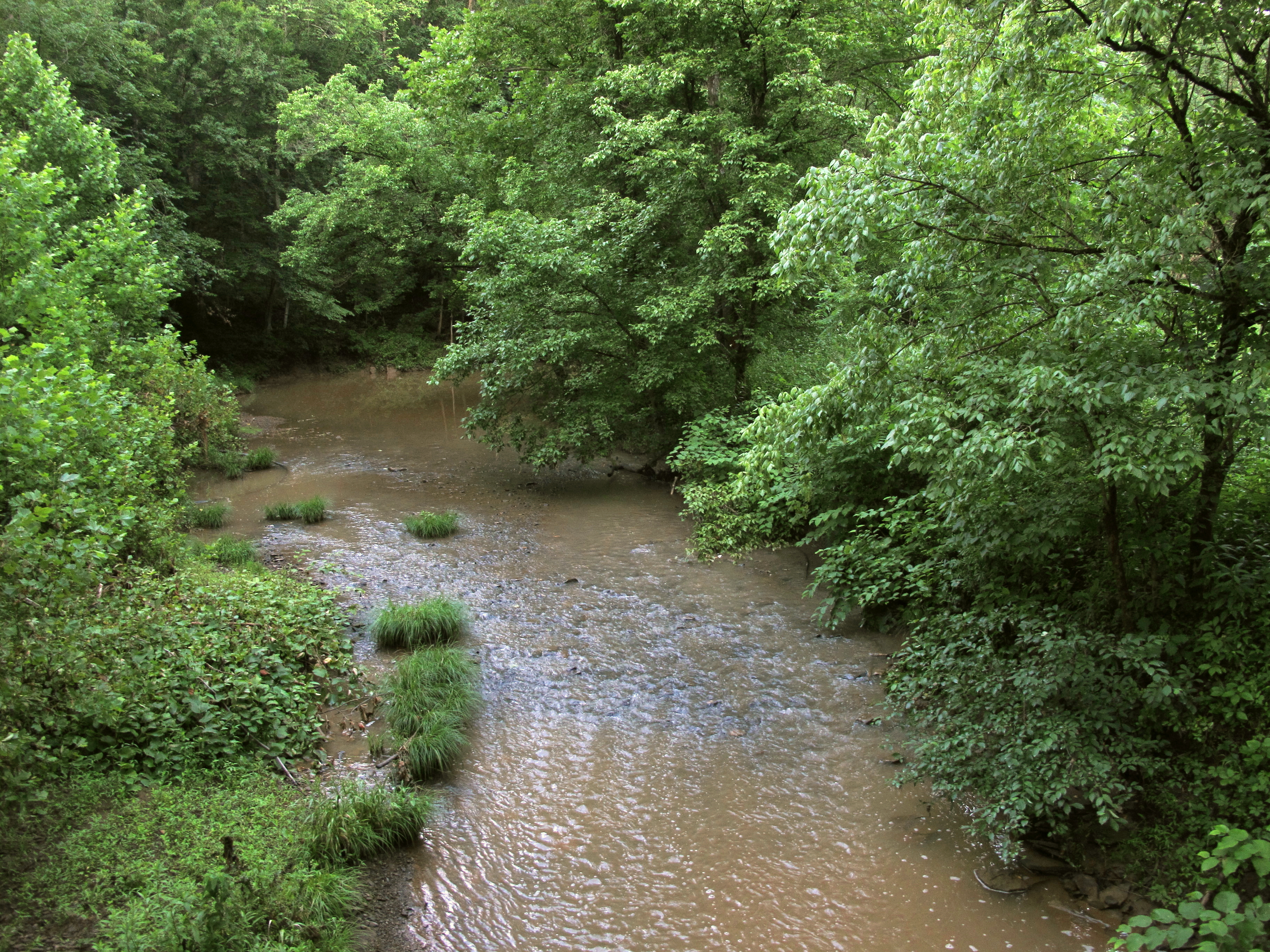
- Arnold Creek in Doddridge County

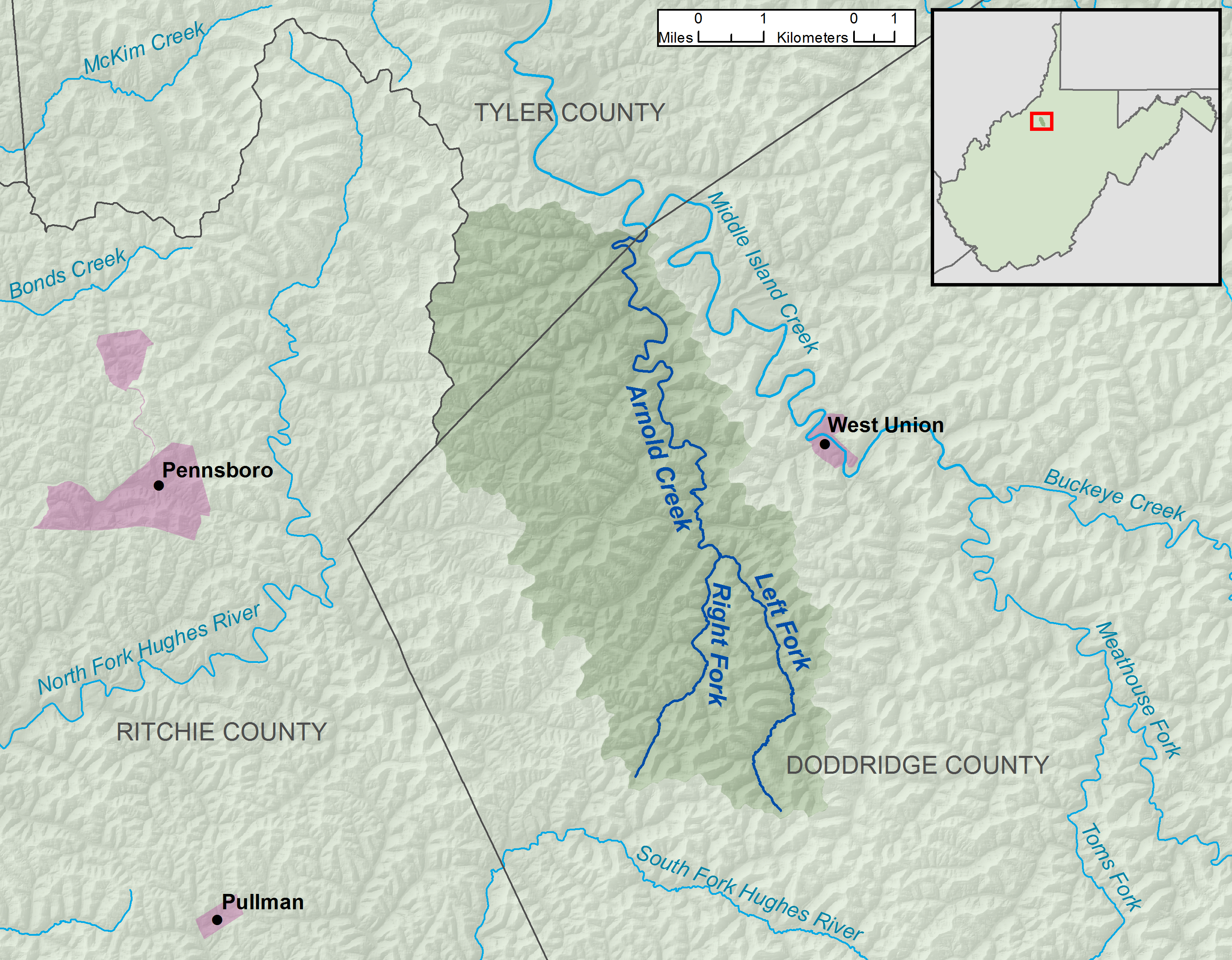
- A map of Arnold Creek and its watershed

Location
- Country: United States
- State: West Virginia
- Counties: Doddridge, Tyler

Physical characteristics
- Source: Left Fork Arnold Creek
  - location: west-northwest of Middle Point, Doddridge County
  - coordinates: 39.2128626°N 80.7878823°W
  - length: 4.9 miles (7.9 km)
  - elevation: 1,100 ft (340 m)
- 2nd source: Right Fork Arnold Creek
  - location: northeast of Oxford, Doddridge County
  - coordinates: 39.2195282°N 80.8301056°W
  - length: 4.6 miles (7.4 km)
  - elevation: 1,045 ft (319 m)
- Source confluence
  - location: southwest of West Union, Doddridge County
  - coordinates: 39.2711943°N 80.8073276°W
  - elevation: 827 ft (252 m)
- Mouth: Middle Island Creek
  - location: east-northeast of Deep Valley
  - coordinates: 39.3434149°N 80.8292723°W
  - elevation: 728 ft (222 m)
- Length: 10.9 mi (17.5 km)
- Basin size: 34.7 sq mi (90 km^{2})

Basin features
- Hydrologic Unit Code: 050302010405 (USGS)

Arnold Creek is a tributary of Middle Island Creek, 10.9 miles (17.5 km) long, in West Virginia in the United States. Via Middle Island Creek and the Ohio River, it is part of the watershed of the Mississippi River, draining an area of 34.7 square miles (90 km^{2}) in a rural region on the unglaciated portion of the Allegheny Plateau.

Arnold Creek is formed in western Doddridge County, approximately 2.4 miles (3.9 km) southwest of West Union, by the confluence of its left and right forks:

- the Left Fork Arnold Creek, 4.9 miles (7.9 km) long, which rises in Doddridge County approximately 2.2 miles (3.5 km) west-northwest of Middle Point and flows generally northward
- the Right Fork Arnold Creek, 4.6 miles (7.4 km) long, which rises in Doddridge County approximately 2.1 miles (3.4 km) northeast of Oxford and flows northeastward.

From this confluence, Arnold Creek flows generally northward through western Doddridge County. Near its mouth, it flows into southern Tyler County for a short distance, returns to Doddridge County, and flows into Middle Island Creek from the south on the boundary of Doddridge and Tyler counties, approximately 0.9 miles (1.4 km) east-northeast of the unincorporated community of Deep Valley.

According to the Geographic Names Information System, the creek has also been known historically by the spelling "Arnolds Creek."

== Tributaries ==
This is a list of named streams in Arnold Creek's watershed. By default, the list is ordered from the mouth of Arnold Creek to its source.

	Name	Flows into	Length	Mouth coordinates	Source coordinates
1	Short Run	Arnold Creek	2.4 miles (3.9 km)	39.339526°N 80.838717°W	39.323136°N 80.888996°W
2	Long Run	Arnold Creek	4.1 miles (6.6 km)	39.325637°N 80.832606°W	39.294248°N 80.885663°W
3	Mudlick Run	Long Run	1.6 miles (2.6 km)	39.310359°N 80.855106°W	39.317025°N 80.88844°W
4	Hugle Run	Long Run	1.4 miles (2.3 km)	39.305915°N 80.85594°W	39.298415°N 80.887329°W
5	Lick Run	Arnold Creek	1.3 miles (2.1 km)	39.311471°N 80.830939°W	39.306111°N 80.847778°W
6	Rock Run	Arnold Creek	1.5 miles (2.4 km)	39.306471°N 80.823717°W	39.306667°N 80.806111°W
7	Wilhelm Run	Arnold Creek	3.5 miles (5.6 km)	39.295082°N 80.821772°W	39.268889°N 80.866667°W
8	Claylick Run	Arnold Creek	3.7 miles (6.0 km)	39.280361°N 80.814272°W	39.261944°N 80.860556°W
9	Pritchard Run	Arnold Creek	2.0 miles (3.2 km)	39.277305°N 80.812328°W	39.268056°N 80.790833°W
10	Middle Run	Arnold Creek	2.1 miles (3.4 km)	39.272028°N 80.812328°W	39.239528°N 80.845662°W
11	Right Fork Arnold Creek	Arnold Creek	4.6 miles (7.4 km)	39.271194°N 80.807328°W	39.219528°N 80.830106°W
12	Left Fork Arnold Creek	Arnold Creek	4.9 miles (7.9 km)	39.271194°N 80.807328°W	39.212863°N 80.787882°W

== See also ==
- List of rivers of West Virginia
