= Middle Point =

Middle Point may refer to:

- Middle Point, Ohio, United States
- Middle Point, West Virginia, United States
- Middle Point, Northern Territory, Australia
