= Udal (surname) =

Udal is a surname. Notable people with this surname include:

- Geoffrey Udal (1908–1980), English cricketer
- John Udal (1848–1925), English cricketer, antiquarian, author
- Robin Udal (1883–1964), English cricketer and colonial administrator
- Shaun Udal (born 1969), English cricketer

== See also ==
- Udall (disambiguation)
