= Peggy Lamm =

American politician (born 1951)

Member of the Colorado House of Representatives from the 13th district
- In office 1994 – January 1997
- Succeeded by: Mark Udall

Personal details
- Born: January 19, 1951 (age 75) Jamestown, New York, U.S.
- Party: Democratic

Peggy Lamm (born January 19, 1951) is an American non-profit administrator and former politician who served as a member of the Colorado House of Representatives from 1994 to January 1997. She was a candidate for Colorado's 7th congressional district seat, in 2006 losing in the Democratic primary election to Ed Perlmutter by a margin of 38% to 53%.

== Career ==
Lamm was a member of the Colorado House of Representatives from 1994 to January 1997. She was also a former school teacher and activist.

While working at the Bighorn Center for Public Policy, Lamm was instrumental in passing the popular Colorado Telemarketing No-Call List. She was also chair of the Colorado Commission on Higher Education and investigated the University of Colorado football/sex scandal. Lamm has also served on numerous boards and commissions including the University of Colorado's Health Sciences Center for Ethics, Humanities and the Law, Hospice of Boulder County, and the National Center for Atmospheric Research Advisory Board. She is currently chair of the board of trustees of Adams State University and worked as a senior program manager at the National Democratic Institute for International Affairs.

In 2016, Lamm became the vice president of development at HopeWest, a non-profit organization based in Grand Junction, Colorado.

== Personal life ==
Born in Jamestown, New York, Lamm was the sister-in-law of Colorado Governor Richard Lamm and journalist Dottie Lamm.
