= Uldall =

Uldall is a surname. Notable people with the surname include:

- Bjørn Uldall (born 1994), Danish ice hockey player
- Elizabeth T. Uldall (1913–2004), American linguist and phonetician
- Gunnar Uldall (1940–2017), German politician and former state minister of Economy and Labour in Hamburg
- Hans Jørgen Uldall (1907–1957), Danish linguist

== See also ==
- Udall (disambiguation)
