= Oxford, Idaho =

- City
- Location of Oxford in Franklin County, Idaho.
- Coordinates: 42°15′35″N 112°01′04″W
- Country: United States
- State: Idaho
- County: Franklin

Area
  - Total: 0.26 sq mi (0.68 km^{2})
  - Land: 0.26 sq mi (0.68 km^{2})
  - Water: 0 sq mi (0.00 km^{2})
- Elevation: 4,777 ft (1,456 m)

Population (2020)
  - Total: 42
  - Density: 198.9/sq mi (76.81/km^{2})
- Time zone: UTC-7 (Mountain (MST))
  - Summer (DST): UTC-6 (MDT)
- Area code: 208
- FIPS code: 16-60040
- GNIS feature ID: 2411346

Oxford was a city in Franklin County, Idaho, United States. The population was 42 at the 2020 census.

== History ==
Oxford was first settled by Members of the Church of Jesus Christ of Latter-day Saints in September 1864.

Oxford has several historical links. It is the location where Harold B. Lee, a future president of the Church of Jesus Christ of Latter-day Saints, taught school. It is also the location where Jefferson Hunt, a colonist who belonged to the Church died. Hunt is buried just behind the hill off the highway at Red Rock Pass.

In a county meeting held on Dec 9, 2024, it was moved by 28-6 vote that Oxford be disincorporated.

== Geography ==
According to the United States Census Bureau, the city has a total area of 0.25 square miles (0.65 km^{2}), all of it land.

== Demographics ==
Historical population
Census	Pop.	Note	%±
1950	110		—
1960	83		−24.5%
1970	75		−9.6%
1980	66		−12.0%
1990	44		−33.3%
2000	53		20.5%
2010	48		−9.4%
2020	42		−12.5%
U.S. Decennial Census

=== 2010 census ===
As of the census of 2010, there were 48 people, 17 households, and 11 families residing in the city. The population density was 192.0 inhabitants per square mile (74.1/km^{2}). There were 22 housing units at an average density of 88.0 per square mile (34.0/km^{2}). The racial makeup of the city was 93.8% White and 6.3% Native American.

There were 17 households, of which 29.4% had children under the age of 18 living with them, 52.9% were married couples living together, 5.9% had a female householder with no husband present, 5.9% had a male householder with no wife present, and 35.3% were non-families. 35.3% of all households were made up of individuals, and 11.8% had someone living alone who was 65 years of age or older. The average household size was 2.82 and the average family size was 3.82.

The median age in the city was 34 years. 41.7% of residents were under the age of 18; 2.1% were between the ages of 18 and 24; 16.8% were from 25 to 44; 27.1% were from 45 to 64; and 12.5% were 65 years of age or older. The gender makeup of the city was 58.3% male and 41.7% female.

=== 2000 census ===
As of the census of 2000, there were 53 people, 18 households, and 14 families residing in the city. The population density was 209.1 inhabitants per square mile (80.7/km^{2}). There were 23 housing units at an average density of 90.8 per square mile (35.1/km^{2}). The racial makeup of the city was 94.34% White and 5.66% Native American. Hispanic or Latino of any race were 5.66% of the population.

There were 18 households, out of which 44.4% had children under the age of 18 living with them, 72.2% were married couples living together, and 22.2% were non-families. 22.2% of all households were made up of individuals, and 11.1% had someone living alone who was 65 years of age or older. The average household size was 2.94 and the average family size was 3.50.

In the city, the population was spread out, with 35.8% under the age of 18, 5.7% from 18 to 24, 20.8% from 25 to 44, 22.6% from 45 to 64, and 15.1% who were 65 years of age or older. The median age was 30 years. For every 100 females, there were 103.8 males. For every 100 females age 18 and over, there were 112.5 males.

The median income for a household in the city was $23,125, and the median income for a family was $28,333. Males had a median income of $15,000 versus $18,750 for females. The per capita income for the city was $9,889. None of the population and none of the families were below the poverty line.
