= Udall family =

American political family

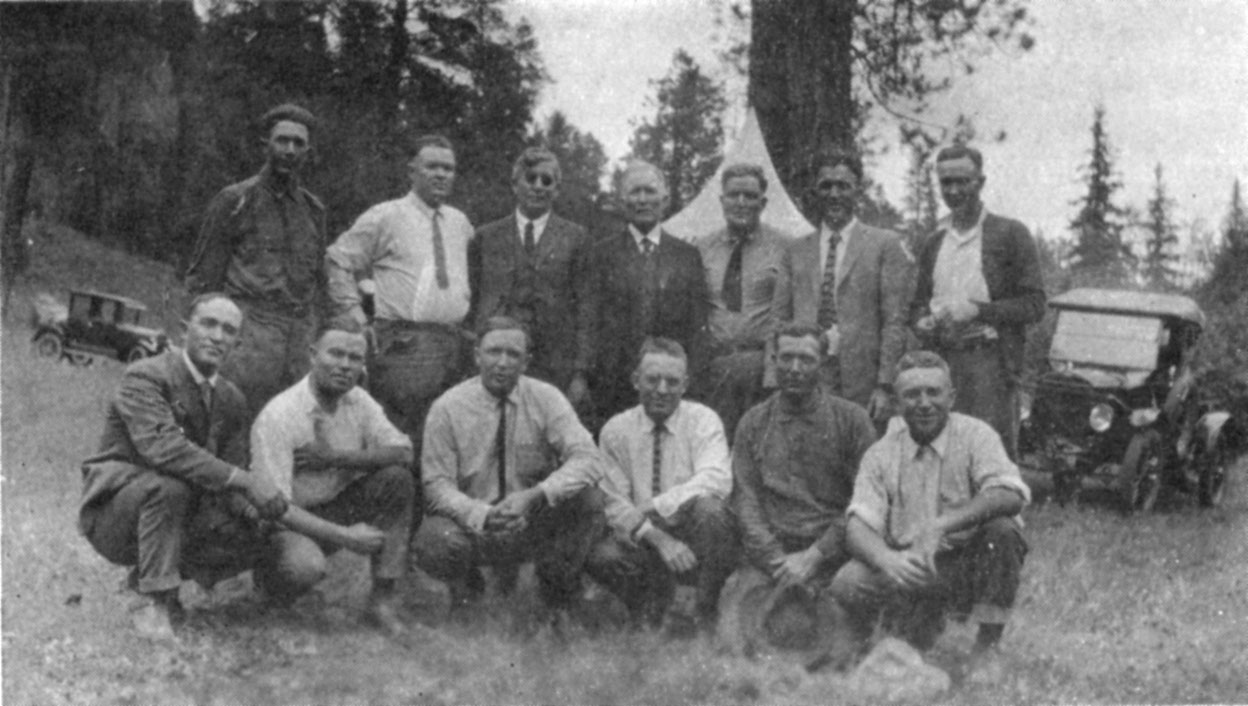
- Standing: Gauis, Joseph K., Joseph, David K., David K. Jr., Jesse, Pratt. Sitting: John, Don, Levi, Gilbert, Harry, Grover (1926)
- Origin: United States
- Titles: List: Governor (of Utah Territory); United States Secretary of the Interior; United States Senator (from New Mexico, Colorado, Oregon); United States Ambassador (to New Zealand, Samoa); Member of the U.S. House of Representatives (from Arizona, New Mexico, Colorado); Member of the Arizona House of Representatives; Chief Justice of the Arizona Supreme Court; Justice of the Arizona Supreme Court; Arizona Territorial Legislature; Mayor (of Phoenix, Kanab, Utah); First Lady (of Phoenix, Kanab, Utah); President of the Oregon Senate; Oregon State Senator; Judge of the United States Court of Appeals for the Ninth Circuit
- Members: Stewart Udall; Mo Udall; Tom Udall; Mark Udall; Mike Lee; Gordon Smith
- Connected families: Hunt, Stewart, Lee, Kimball

The Udall family is a U.S. political family rooted in the American West. Its role in politics spans over 100 years and four generations. Udall politicians have been elected from four different states: Arizona, Colorado, New Mexico, and Oregon. If viewed as a combined entity, the Udall-Hunt-Lee family has been elected from six states: Arizona, California, Colorado, New Mexico, Oregon, and Utah.

Three Udall family cousins were nominated by the two major American political parties for the United States Senate elections of 2008, of which the two Democrats were elected and seated in 2009.

== Pioneer generation ==
David King Udall can be considered the family's founder. He was born in St. Louis, Missouri, to David Udall and Eliza King, recent Mormon converts from England. They immigrated to the United States in 1851. The family traveled across the Great Plains and Rocky Mountains by ox cart and settled in Nephi, Utah. The elder David later became a Mormon bishop.

In this environment, the younger David grew up to be a fervent Mormon as well. He married Ella Stewart, and they settled in Kanab, Utah. Shortly after their marriage, David left to serve as a missionary in England for two years. In 1880, he was called by his church to move with his family to St. Johns, Apache County, Arizona, in order to become the local bishop and facilitate further Mormon migration into that community. This made David unpopular with established residents of St. Johns, who didn't want the Mormons there, but it did make him instantly prominent in the community.

David married a second wife, Ida Hunt, in 1882. She was a granddaughter of Jefferson Hunt. David was prosecuted for, but not convicted of, bigamy in 1884. In 1885, he was indicted for perjury stemming from a sworn statement he made backing a land claim for Miles Romney (the grandfather of George W. Romney). His bail was posted by Baron Goldwater, the father of Barry Goldwater. The trial and its aftermath received heavy regional press coverage. David was convicted and sentenced to three years of imprisonment at a federal penitentiary in Detroit. Later, both the prosecutor and presiding judge at the trial wrote letters to President Grover Cleveland supporting a pardon, stating they believed that David had misunderstood the law and that he lacked any criminal intent. President Cleveland issued a pardon after David had served just three months of his sentence.

In 1887, David was made a stake president, a higher position in the Mormon hierarchy. In that position, he oversaw Mormon affairs over a broad portion of Arizona.

That same year, Tommy Stewart, David's double brother-in-law, was elected to serve in the Utah Territorial Legislature. David's wife Eliza was Tommy's sister, and Tommy was married to David's sister Mary, making Tommy a member of the Udall family by marriage. Tommy would later become mayor of Kanab.

In 1890, the LDS Church officially declared that it opposed its members entering into polygamous marriages. After this, hostility toward Mormons in many communities outside Utah decreased. Between improved relations with non-Mormons and an ever-growing Mormon population in eastern Arizona, David's popularity improved, such that he was elected to a single term in the Arizona Territorial Legislature in 1899 as a Republican. He died as a widely respected member of his community in 1938, living long enough to see several of his sons elected to public office.

David's younger brother, Joseph Udall, also settled in Arizona, becoming a Mormon Bishop in Eagar, Arizona, and was active in local politics. He served as chairman of the Apache County Board of Supervisors, 1906–1920.

== Sons of David King Udall ==
Twelve of David King Udall's children lived to adulthood, six by each of his wives. Four of his sons became attorneys; of those, all were elected or appointed to political and judicial offices. All of the Udall politicians descended from David's wife Eliza have been Democrats, while most of the politicians descended from his wife Ida have been Republicans.

The first of David's children to seek office was Levi Stewart Udall, who ran for clerk to the Arizona Superior Court in 1922 as a Democrat. His older brother, John Hunt Udall, then filed to run for the same office as a Republican. John won.

John was later elected mayor of Phoenix, Arizona, and he served in that office from 1936 to 1938. He later served as a judge and was narrowly defeated as a candidate for the U.S. Congress in 1948. He was first married to Ruth Kimball, sister of Spencer W. Kimball and niece by marriage of Joseph F. Smith. Ruth died at a young age, and he remarried to Leah Smith, daughter of Jesse Nathaniel Smith.

Levi followed a career in the judiciary and was elected Justice of the Arizona Supreme Court in 1946. He served on that Court from 1947 until his death in 1960, and he was Chief Justice 1951–1953 and 1957–1959. Levi was married to Louisa Lee. His brother, Jesse, was married to Louisa's sister, Lela Lee. For this reason, their respective descendants are double cousins. The Lee sisters were granddaughters of John D. Lee and Jacob Hamblin.

Jesse Addison Udall served in the Arizona House of Representatives from 1931 to 1938. Upon his brother Levi's death, he was appointed by the governor to fill the same seat on the Arizona Supreme Court. He served 1960–1972, and he was Chief Justice in 1964 and 1969.

Don Taylor Udall served as Representative to the Arizona State Legislature from 1941–1942. He resigned to serve in World War II and would later become a judge.

== Grandchildren of David King Udall ==
Mayor of
Phoenix, Arizona
Nick Udall
(D) 1948–1952
(1913–2005)
Parent was
John H. Udall

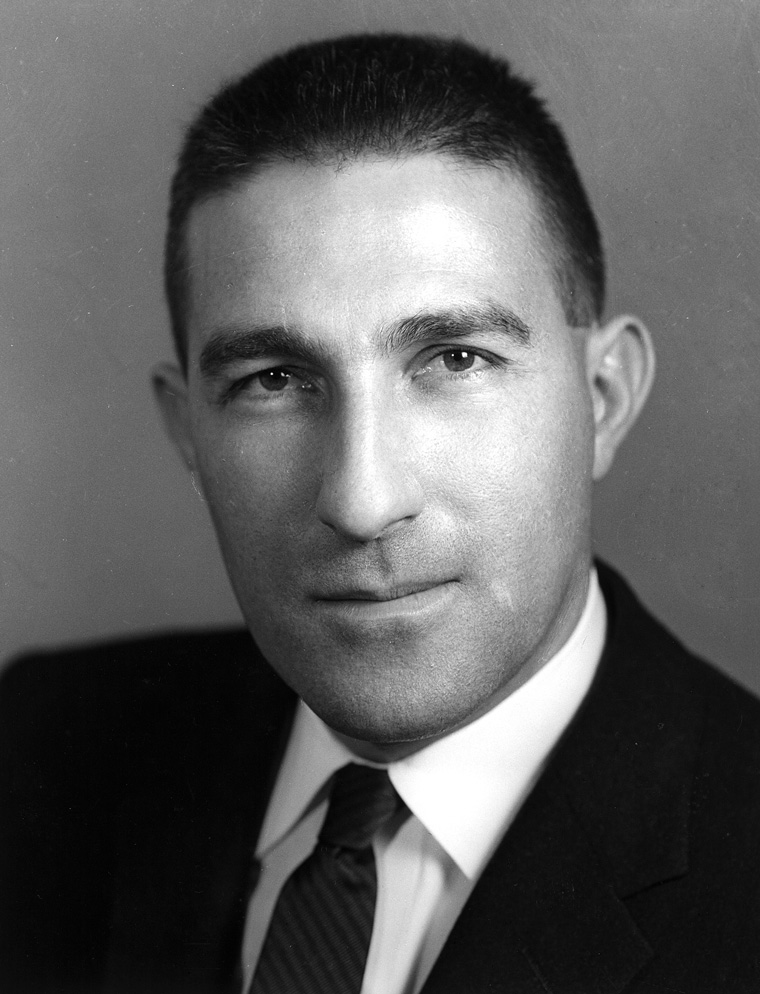
Secretary of Interior
Stewart Udall
(D) 1961–1969
(1920–2010)
Parent was Levi S. Udall

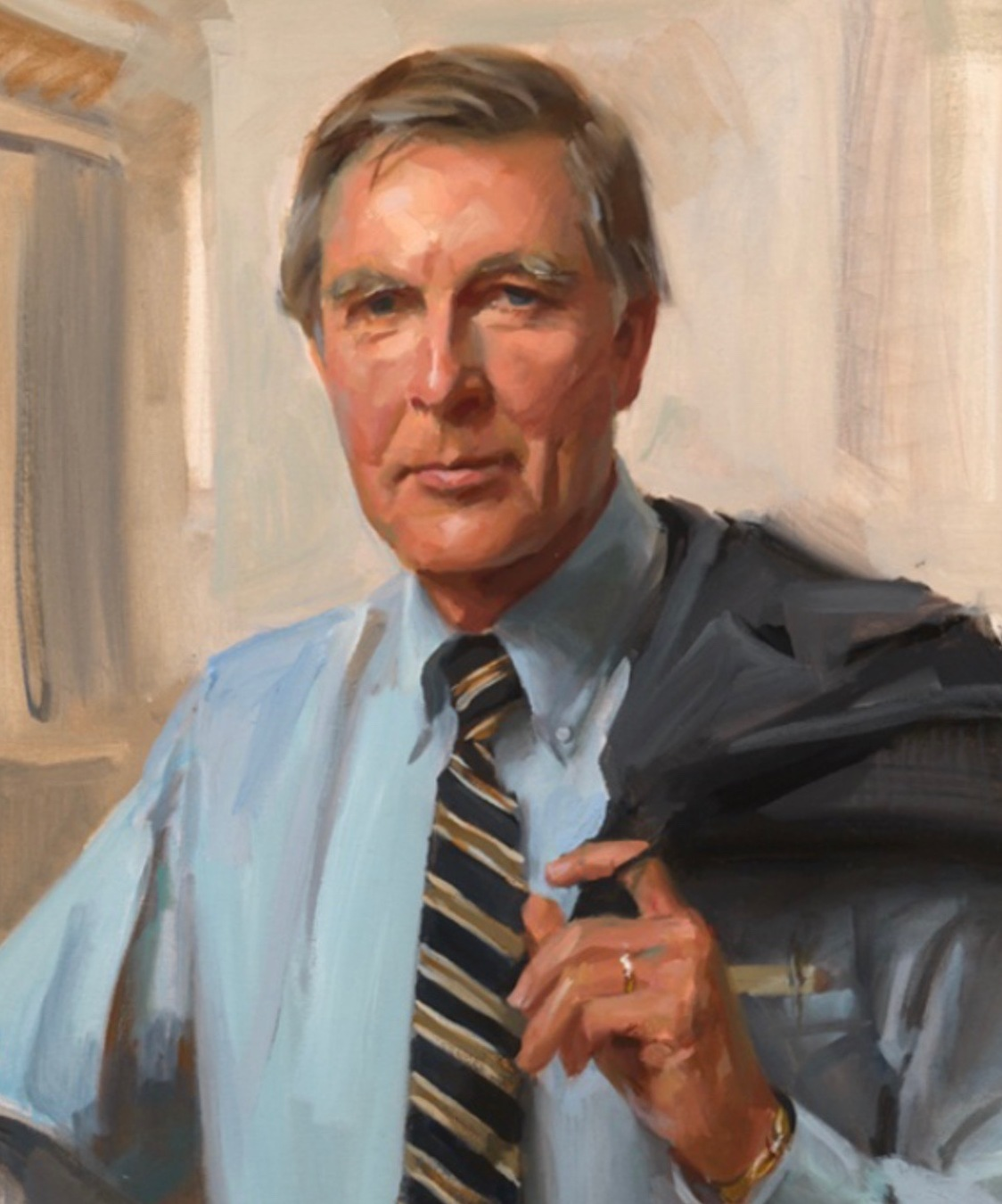
U.S. Representative
Mo Udall
D-Arizona 1961–1991
(1922–1998)
Parent was Levi S. Udall

Nick Udall, son of John H. Udall, followed in his father's footsteps and served as mayor of Phoenix from 1948 to 1952. Unlike his father, he was a Democrat. He also served as a Superior Court Judge in Maricopa County, Arizona, from 1952 to 1956. Many kinships between the Udalls and other politicians and well-known people come through Nick. This is not so surprising when considering that Nick was a great-grandson of Utah Lieutenant Governor Heber C. Kimball, who had 43 wives, 63 children, 176 grandchildren, and 564 great-grandchildren. Among Nick's cousins is U.S. Ambassador J. Reuben Clark.

Stewart Lee Udall, son of Levi S. Udall, served as a Democratic U.S. Representative from Arizona (1955–1961) and also as Secretary of the Interior (1961–1969). Point Udall, U.S. Virgin Islands, the easternmost point in the United States, is named in his honor.

Morris King "Mo" Udall, Stewart's brother, also served as a Democratic U.S. Representative from Arizona (1961–1991) and ran for the Democratic nomination for President of the United States in 1976. Point Udall, Guam, the westernmost point in the United States, is named in his honor.

David K. Udall, son of Jesse A. Udall, served as a city councilman in Mesa, Arizona, for eight years.

L. Kenyon Udall, son of Jesse A. Udall, served as the mayor of Gilbert, Arizona, from January 17, 1956, to June 8, 1959.

Joseph Leon Pace, son of Luella Udall Pace, was mayor of San Jose, California, during the 1960s.

== Fourth generation ==
Current-generation cousins in the United States Senate

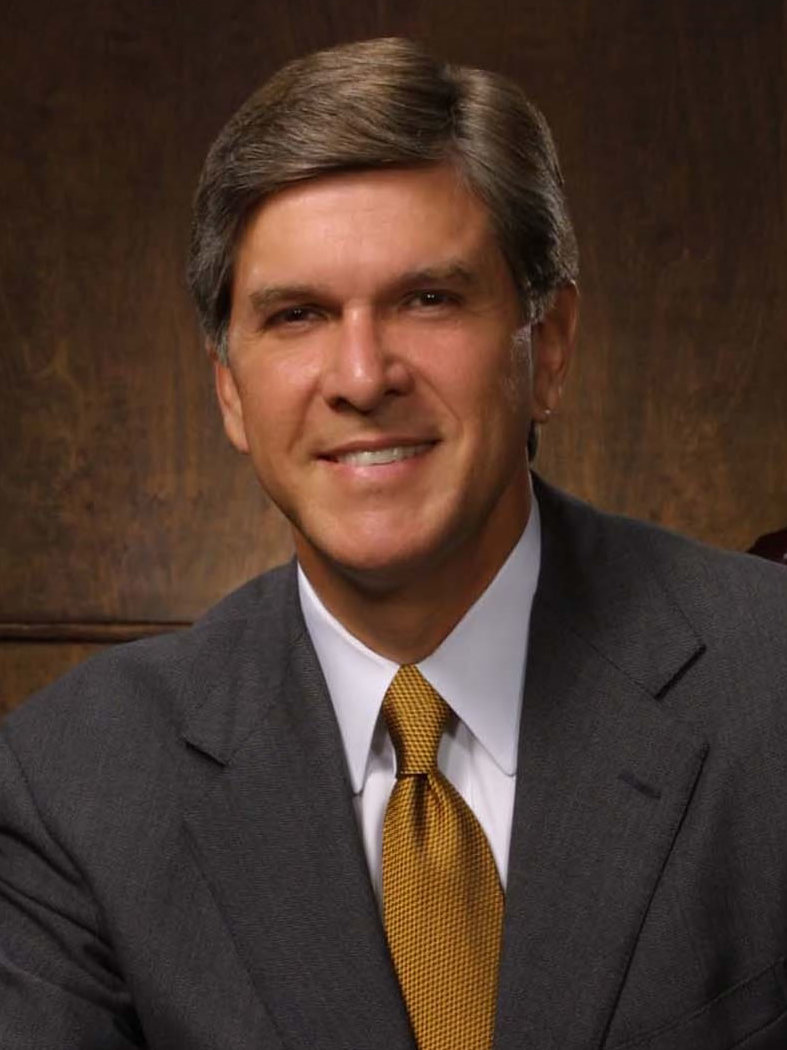
Senator Gordon Smith
R-Oregon 1997–2009
Grandparent was Jesse Udall

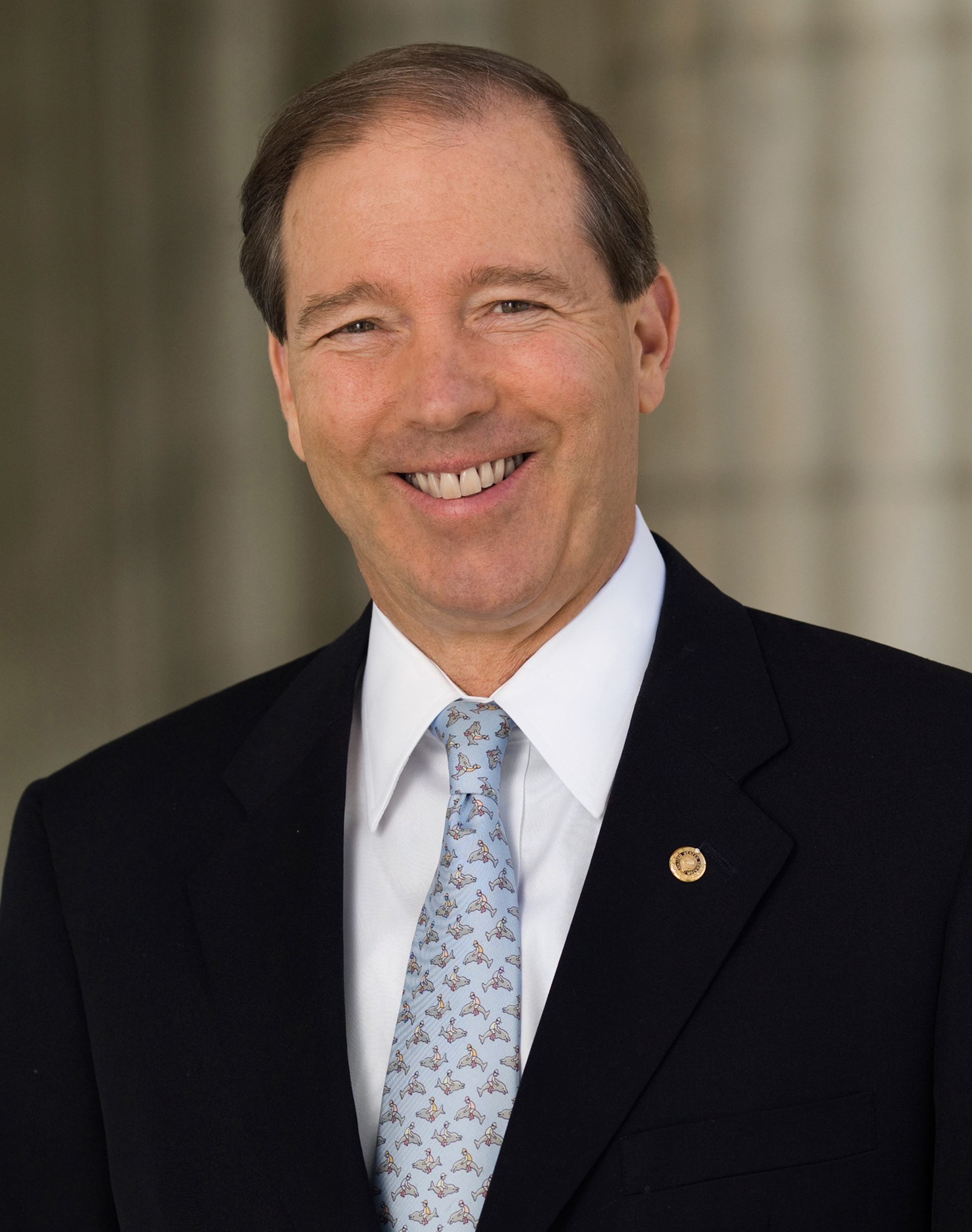
Senator Tom Udall
D-New Mex. 2009–2021
Parent was Stewart Udall

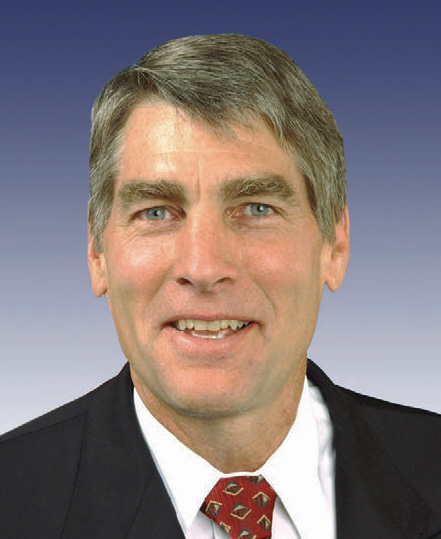
Senator Mark Udall
D-Colorado 2009–2015
Parent was Mo Udall

Thomas Stewart "Tom" Udall, Stewart Udall's son, was the first of David King Udall's great-grandchildren to hold political office. He was a practicing attorney and ran unsuccessfully for Congress as a Democrat in New Mexico in 1984 and 1988. In 1990, he was elected Attorney General of New Mexico, a position he held from 1991–1999. He was finally elected to the U.S. House of Representatives from New Mexico's 3rd District in 1998, and he served as Representative from 1999–2009. During this period, he served in Congress beside his cousins Mark Udall and Gordon Smith (see below), marking one of the very few times in history when three members of the same family have served in Congress simultaneously. In 2008, he was elected to the U.S. Senate from New Mexico in a landslide victory. He took office in January 2009. In 2019, he announced he would not seek a third term.

Gordon Harold Smith, Jesse Udall's grandson through his daughter Jessica Udall Smith, was the next to venture into politics. His father, Milan Dale Smith, Sr., was an Assistant Secretary of Agriculture, and he later built a successful frozen food empire. Gordon obtained a law degree and initially pursued a career as an attorney before later taking over the frozen food business. In 1992, he was elected to the Oregon State Senate as a Republican. He became president of that body in 1995. In 1996, he was narrowly defeated when running for the U.S. Senate in a special election to replace Bob Packwood. Later that year, he won election to Oregon's other U.S. Senate seat, the only time anyone has ever run for the Senate twice in the same year. He served in the Senate from 1997–2009. In 2008, he was narrowly defeated for reelection, following a shift in Oregon politics over the preceding decade toward the Democratic Party. He was the last remaining Republican to hold statewide office at the time. Most Udall politicians have also been either Hunt or Lee descendants. Gordon Smith is unique in being descended from both additional lines.

Mark Emery Udall, Morris Udall's son, pursued a 20-year career as an Outward Bound instructor and director before launching a political career in 1996 with a successful campaign for the Colorado State House of Representatives as a Democrat. He served a single term there before making a successful bid for the U.S. House from Colorado's 2nd Congressional District in 1998. He held that office for ten years. In 2008, he was elected to the U.S. Senate from Colorado, and he was seated in January 2009. Raised Presbyterian, Mark is the first non-Mormon politician in the family. With Barack Obama's nomination of Ken Salazar as Secretary of the Interior, Colorado's other Senate seat was vacated on January 20, 2009, and Mark became Colorado's senior senator after just three weeks in office. In 2014, he was defeated for re-election by Republican Cory Gardner.

Milan Dale Smith, Jr., Gordon Smith's brother, was nominated to the federal judiciary by George W. Bush in 2006. He was unanimously confirmed by the Senate (including his brother), and he currently serves on the U.S. Ninth Circuit.

David King Udall, son of Mesa councilman David K. Udall, serves as a Superior Court Judge in Maricopa County, Arizona (since 2001). His brother Jesse is married [2] to Michelle Udall, who was elected to the Arizona House of Representatives in 2016.

Mike Lee and Thomas R. Lee, though not Udalls, are second cousins to Mark and Tom Udall and Gordon Smith; their father, Rex E. Lee, a well-known scholar of constitutional law and solicitor general from 1981 to 1985, was a first cousin of Stewart and Morris Udall; Mike Lee serves as a United States senator from Utah (since 2011); and Thomas R. Lee is an associate justice of the Utah Supreme Court.

== Family tree ==
| Udall (by blood or by marriage) | Lee | Stewart | Woolley | Hunt | Kimball |
| Republican | | Democrat | | Whig |

== See also ==
- Lee–Hamblin family
- The Church of Jesus Christ of Latter-day Saints in Arizona
