= John Oliver Udal =

British soldier, shipbroker and alderman (1926–2022)

John Udal
- Born: John Oliver Udal; 1926
- Died: 12 September 2022 (aged 96)
- Employers: Irish Guards; Sudan Political Service

John Oliver Udal (1926 – 12 September 2022) was an officer in the Irish Guards who served in Mandatory Palestine. He was then a district commissioner in Anglo-Egyptian Sudan. He was responsible for the Shilluk Kingdom and was privileged to witness the coronation ceremony for Reth Kur Wad Fafiti in Fashoda in 1952.

Udal was the grandson of John Symonds Udal. He was educated at Winchester College and New College, Oxford.

He was a councillor for Kensington South on the London County Council from 1961 to 1965. He started a career as a shipbroker in 1966. He was then an alderman on the Greater London Council from 1967 to 1973.

Udal died on 12 September 2022, at the age of 96.

== Works ==
- The Nile in Darkness: Conquest and Exploration 1504–1862 (1998)
- The Nile in Darkness, a Flawed Unity, 1863–1899 (2005)
- Munich on the Nile – The Road to Sudanese Independence (2016)
