= William Thomas Stewart =

American politician (1853–1935)

Utah Territorial Legislature 1887, 1889 Mayor of Kanab, Utah
- In office 1889–1891

Personal details
- Born: October 18, 1853 Big Cottonwood Canyon, Utah Territory
- Died: August 21, 1935 (aged 81) Alamo, Nevada, US
- Party: unknown
- Spouse(s): Rachel Tamar Hamblin; Fannie Maria Little; Mary Udall

William Thomas Stewart (October 18, 1853 – August 21, 1935) was mayor of Kanab, Utah, from 1889 to 1891, and a Representative to the Utah Territorial Legislature in 1887 and 1889. He is a member of the Udall political family.

The son of Levi Stewart and Margery (Wilkerson) Stewart, he was born and raised in Salt Lake City, Utah Territory. He was a member of the Church of Jesus Christ of Latter-day Saints. He moved to Kanab, Utah in 1870 when his father was called by Brigham Young to create a new settlement there. A few months later his mother and several of his siblings were killed in a fire.

He married Rachel Tamar Hamblin, daughter of Jacob Hamblin, in 1873.

He became a polygamist in 1879 when he married Fannie Maria Little. He took a third wife, Mary Udall in 1880. She was the sister of David King Udall who was already married to William's sister Eliza Stewart.

In 1887 and 1889 he was elected to the Utah Territorial Legislature, and in 1889 he was elected as the mayor of Kanab.

In 1901 he was called by the Church of Jesus Christ of Latter-day Saints to help settle Alamo, Nevada.

He died in Alamo in 1935.

Preceded by James L Bunting	Mayor of Kanab, Utah; 1889–1891	Succeeded by W.S. Lewis
