= Lee–Hamblin family =

American political family in the American West

The Lee–Hamblin family is a political family rooted in the American West. It is intertwined closely with the Udall family, and most, though not all the notable Lees are also Udall descendants. John D. Lee is also a direct descendant of Richard Lee II of the Lee family of Virginia.

J. David Lee (1851–1922), a son of John D. Lee, had two wives. His notable descendants all come through his second wife Inez Hamblin, who was a daughter of Jacob Hamblin. Together they have the distinction of having four great-grandchildren as U.S. senators from four different U.S. states.

One exception was Ettie Lee of Los Angeles who was California Teacher of the Year and U.S. Teacher of the Year in the 60's and who donated $19 million to homes for delinquent boys on her death (Ettie Lee Homes). Her mother was Evaline Dorinda Clark.

Grandchildren:

Rex E. Lee, U.S. Solicitor General
Morris K. Udall, U.S. Representative from Arizona and 1976 U.S. presidential candidate
Stewart Udall, U.S. Representative from Arizona and U.S. Secretary of the Interior

Great-grandchildren:

Mike Lee, U.S. Senator from Utah
Thomas R. Lee, Associate Justice, Utah Supreme Court
Gordon H. Smith, U.S. Senator from Oregon
Milan Smith, Jr., Federal Judge, U.S. 9th Circuit
Mark Udall, U.S. Senator from Colorado
Tom Udall, U.S. Senator from New Mexico

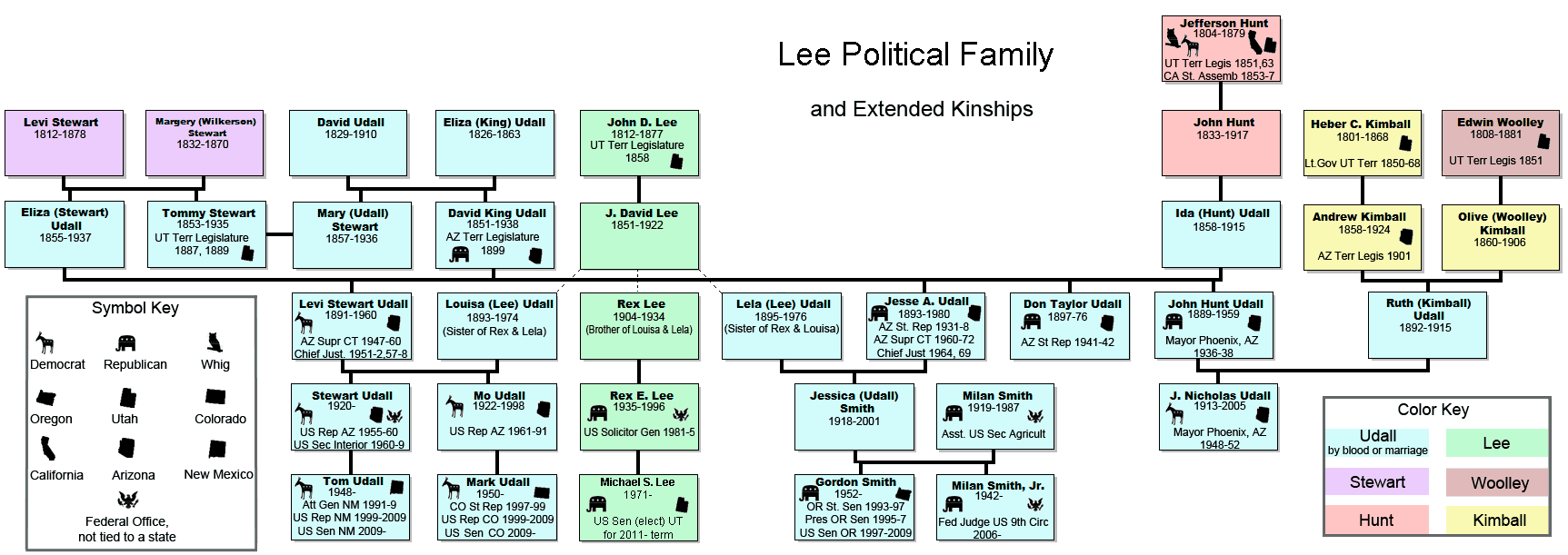
