= Geoffrey Udal =

English cricketer

Geoffrey Francis Uvedale Udal (23 February 1908 – 5 December 1980) was an English cricketer.

Udal was born in Holborn, London on 23 February 1908. He played once as a right-handed batsman and an opening right-arm fast bowler for Middlesex in 1932, while serving in the RAF. He later represented Leicestershire in three matches in 1946. He was found to be suffering from a broken rib during his Leicestershire appearances and played no subsequent first-class cricket. Udal died in Frimley, Surrey on 5 December 1980, at the age of 72.

His grandfather John Udal as Attorney-General in Fiji and did much to encourage cricket there. His grandson Shaun Udal has represented Hampshire, Middlesex and England.
