= Middle Point, West Virginia =

- Unincorporated community
- Location within the state of West Virginia Middle; Point (the United States)
- Coordinates: 39°12′21″N 80°44′48″W
- Country: United States
- State: West Virginia
- County: Doddridge
- Elevation: 1,211 ft (369 m)
- Time zone: UTC-5 (Eastern (EST))
  - Summer (DST): UTC-4 (EDT)
- GNIS ID: 1549821

Middle Point is an unincorporated community in Doddridge County, West Virginia, United States.
