= Oxford, West Virginia =

- Unincorporated community
- Location within the state of West Virginia Oxford (the United States)
- Coordinates: 39°12′20″N 80°51′53″W
- Country: United States
- State: West Virginia
- County: Doddridge
- Elevation: 814 ft (248 m)
- Time zone: UTC-5 (Eastern (EST))
  - Summer (DST): UTC-4 (EDT)
- GNIS ID: 1555288

Oxford is an unincorporated community in Doddridge County, West Virginia, United States. Its post office was in operation until 1908.
