= Mark Udall =

American politician (born 1950)

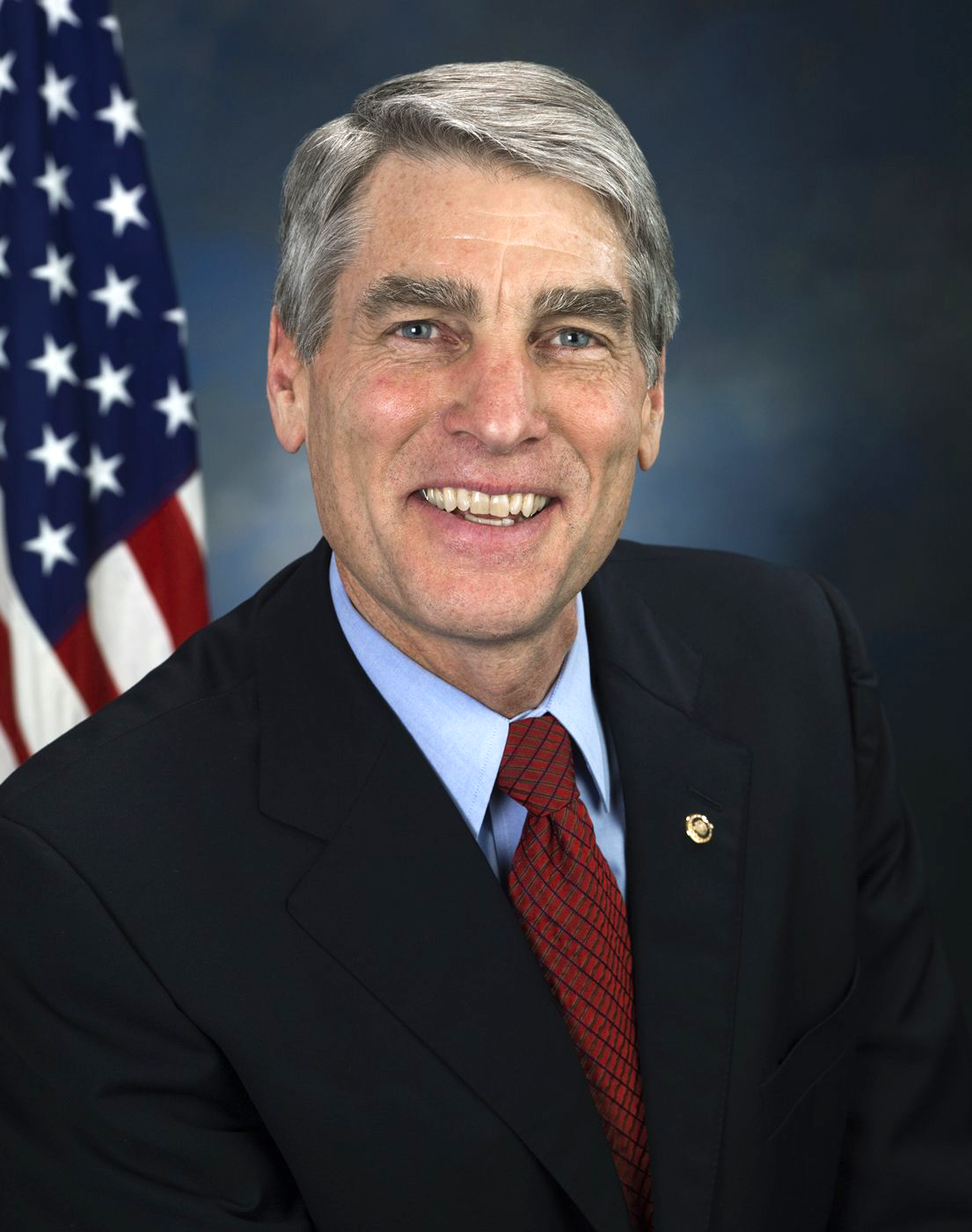
- Official portrait, 2009

United States Senator from Colorado
- In office January 3, 2009 – January 3, 2015
- Preceded by: Wayne Allard
- Succeeded by: Cory Gardner

Member of the U.S. House of Representatives from Colorado's 2nd district
- In office January 3, 1999 – January 3, 2009
- Preceded by: David Skaggs
- Succeeded by: Jared Polis

Member of the Colorado House of Representatives from the 13th district
- In office January 1997 – January 1999
- Preceded by: Peggy Lamm
- Succeeded by: Tom Plant

Personal details
- Born: Mark Emery Udall; July 18, 1950 (age 75) Tucson, Arizona, U.S.
- Party: Democratic
- Spouse: Maggie Fox (m. 1982)
- Children: 2
- Parent: Mo Udall (father)
- Relatives: Udall family
- Education: Williams College (BA)
- Udall's voice Udall questioning Thomas Tidwell, chief of the U.S. Forest Service, at a hearing of the Senate Energy Committee. Recorded February 6, 2014

Mark Emery Udall (/ˈjudɔːl/ YOO-dawl; born July 18, 1950) is an American politician who served as a United States senator from Colorado from 2009 to 2015. A member of the Democratic Party, he previously served in the United States House of Representatives, representing Colorado's 2nd congressional district. Before being elected to Congress, he represented parts of Boulder, Colorado, in the Colorado House of Representatives.

Throughout his career, he has proposed legislation to support renewable energy, expand national parks, and protect natural resources. Born in Tucson, Arizona, he is the son of former U.S. Representative Mo Udall and the nephew of former U.S. Representative Stewart Udall. A member of the Udall family, a western American political family, his relatives include New Mexico's Tom Udall and Utah's Mike Lee. Udall ran for reelection in 2014 to a second term in the U.S. Senate, but was narrowly defeated by Republican challenger Cory Gardner.

== Early life and education ==
Mark Udall was born in Tucson, Arizona, to Patricia J. (née Emery) and Morris "Mo" Udall, the U.S. representative for Arizona's 2nd congressional district from 1961 to 1991, and candidate for the 1976 Democratic nomination for President. Udall attended and graduated from Canyon del Oro High School in 1968, where he was elected student body president. Udall won the Arizona State Golf Championship Boy's division in 1968.

Udall later graduated from Williams College in 1972 with a Bachelor of Arts in American civilization. In 1976 Udall worked as a field coordinator for his father's campaign to win the Democratic nomination against Jimmy Carter.

After college, Udall moved to Colorado and began his career with Outward Bound, a non-profit outdoor education organization. For ten years Udall worked as a course instructor, in which he would bring patrons on outdoor expeditions. During his career in Outdoor Adventure Education he also was an instructor at DoDDS's Project Bold, located at the Hinterbrand Lodge in Berchtesgaden, Germany. Afterward, Udall served as Outward Bound's Executive Director for ten years, after which Udall decided to retire, completing his twenty-year career with Outward Bound.

== Colorado House of Representatives ==
In 1996, Udall was encouraged to run for the Colorado House of Representatives by Peggy Lamm of the 13th district, who had decided to retire. After running a grassroots campaign in the swing district, Udall narrowly defeated Republican Drew Bolin to represent the Longmont and Boulder district. During his two years in office, Udall served on the Judiciary and Agriculture Livestock & Natural Resources Committees.

While in the Colorado House, Udall proposed legislation titled "Renewable Electricity Standard." It would have required at least 10% of energy consumed in Colorado to be provided by renewable sources rather than fossil fuels. The bill died in committee. Udall chose not to run for re-election, instead decided to run for the United States Congress. He was succeeded by fellow Democrat, Tom Plant.

== U.S. House of Representatives ==
=== Elections ===
After one term in the Colorado House of Representatives, Udall opted to run for Colorado's 2nd congressional district, which was being vacated by incumbent David Skaggs. In the primary, Udall had three opponents: Gene Nichol, Paul Weissmann, and Dave Thomas. He won with 44% of the vote, defeating his closest opponent Nichol by 7 percentage points. He faced the Republican nominee, Boulder, Colorado Mayor Bob Greenlee in the general election. The race was unexpectedly close, with Udall narrowly winning, 49% to 47%. Udall was consecutively elected to five terms in the House, without major opposition. He was eventually succeeded by Jared Polis, after he decided to run for the Senate seat being vacated by retiring Republican Wayne Allard.

== U.S. Senate ==
=== Elections ===
2004

In 2004, Udall announced his candidacy for the Senate seat which was being vacated by Ben Nighthorse Campbell. However, the following day, Colorado Attorney General Ken Salazar announced his candidacy as well. Udall bowed out of the race and endorsed Salazar.

2008

Senate election results by county.

On January 15, 2007, incumbent Senator Wayne Allard announced he would not run for a third term. In April 2007, Udall announced his campaign for the Senate. Udall became the Democratic nominee for the race after running unopposed in the primary. In the general election, Udall faced former U.S. Representative Republican Bob Schaffer. By August 28, 2008, over $10 million had been spent on attack ads against Udall by political parties and political action committees, an amount higher than in any other Senate race that year.

The race was especially competitive, with Democrats wanting to expand their majority as much as possible due to that year's presidential election. While both CQ Politics and The Rothenberg Political Report estimated Udall would win, and The Cook Political Report considered it a 'Toss Up,' Udall maintained a steady lead in the polls, but with neither candidate usually topping 50%. Udall described the race as "the toughest climb I've ever taken." On November 4, Udall won the election by 240,265 votes.

2014

Senate election results by county.

On January 7, 2013, Udall announced he was running for re-election. Udall was unopposed in the Democratic primary, and faced Republican U.S. Representative Cory Gardner in the general election. Although Udall was heavily favored in early polls, around September, Gardner gained and held a steady lead thereafter.

Udall's re-election campaign focused on reproductive and women's rights. Throughout, Udall attacked Gardner for his former support of a fetal personhood initiative, and claimed in ads that Gardner "championed an eight-year crusade to outlaw birth control here in Colorado." PolitiFact.com rated his claim "half-true," saying that it "leaves out important details." On MSNBC's The Last Word, Alex Wagner attributed Udall's trailing poll numbers to his "focus on reproductive rights." Due to his campaign's emphasis on these issues, Udall was ridiculed as "Mark Uterus." In an October 2014 Denver Post endorsement of his opponent, the editorial board stated that "Udall's campaign has devoted a shocking amount of energy and money trying to convince voters that Gardner seeks to outlaw birth control despite the congressman's call for over-the-counter sales of contraceptives. Udall is trying to frighten voters rather than inspire them with a hopeful vision."

Towards the end of his campaign, Udall was accompanied by Second Lady of the United States Jill Biden, Massachusetts Senator Elizabeth Warren, and former Secretary of State Hillary Clinton. In July 2014, President Barack Obama headlined a fundraiser for Udall's campaign. Udall lost the election.

=== Senate tenure ===
Less than one month after Udall took office in the Senate, newly elected President Obama nominated senior Colorado Senator Ken Salazar to serve as his Secretary of the Interior. After his confirmation, Udall became the Senate's most junior senior Senator.

=== Committee assignments ===
- Committee on Armed Services
  - Subcommittee on Emerging Threats and Capabilities
  - Subcommittee on Readiness and Management Support
  - Subcommittee on Strategic Forces (Chair)
- Committee on Energy and Natural Resources
  - Subcommittee on Energy
  - Subcommittee on National Parks (Chair)
  - Subcommittee on Public Lands and Forests
- Select Committee on Intelligence

== Political positions ==
=== Abortion ===
The National Right to Life Committee (NRLC) gave Udall a 0% rating for abortion rights, while his opponent in 2014, Cory Gardner, received a 100% rating.

=== Agriculture ===
In February 2014, Udall voted for the Federal Agriculture Reform and Risk Management Act of 2013, a $1 trillion bill that ended direct payments to farmers but expanded crop insurance by $7 billion over the next decade, created new subsidies for rice and peanut growers that will kick in if or when prices drop, and cut food stamp subsidies for 1.7 million people in 15 states.

In 2011, Udall and Senator Susan Collins successfully introduced an amendment to the Senate's agriculture appropriations bill. The amendment to the appropriations bill removed a limit placed on potatoes in the Department of Agriculture's new school nutrition guidelines.

=== Campaign finance reform ===
Udall is a member of the ReFormers Caucus of Issue One, a bipartisan organization dedicated to reducing the influence of money in politics.

=== Cannabis ===
Although Senator to the first state to legalize the recreational sale of marijuana, Udall took no official stance on Colorado Amendment 64 during its campaign. After Amendment 64 and Washington state's similar initiative passed in 2012, Udall and the Senate delegations from Washington addressed a letter to Attorney General Eric Holder and White House Chief of Staff Denis McDonough, imploring them to "let this experiment unfold," as Udall characterized it.

=== Domestic security ===
Udall has opposed the National Security Agency's (NSA) mass surveillance programs. Following the revelation of the NSA's mass surveillance of Americans, Udall has been an advocate for reform. Udall, along with Senators Ron Wyden and Rand Paul, published an Op-ed in the Los Angeles Times expressing their collective desire to "end the dragnet — and to affirm that we can keep our nation secure without trampling on and abandoning Americans' constitutional rights." Udall expressed his support for Edward Snowden to return to America to "make his case." After reports that the Central Intelligence Agency improperly spied on U.S. Senators, Udall called for the resignation of Agency Director John O. Brennan.

After the September 11 attacks, the one-term Representative Udall was one of 66 House members to vote against the Patriot Act. In 2011, Udall voted against reauthorizing the Patriot Act. In July 2014, Udall voted against the CISPA bill, a proposed law that would allow for the sharing of Internet traffic information between the U.S. government and technology and manufacturing companies, voicing his concerns that it "lacks adequate protections for the privacy rights."

During the 2011 debate over the National Defense Authorization Act for Fiscal Year 2012 (NDAA), Udall introduced an amendment to end the practice of military detention of American citizens indefinitely and without trial. In response to the amendment's introduction, the Barack Obama administration threatened to veto the bill. The amendment was rejected by a vote of 60–38 (with 2 abstaining). Udall subsequently voted for the Act in the joint session of Congress that passed it, and though he remained "extremely troubled" by the detainee provisions, he promised to "push Congress to conduct the maximum amount of oversight possible."

Udall has supported PRISM, a clandestine anti-terrorism mass electronic surveillance data mining program launched in 2007 by the National Security Agency (NSA); however, he has also expressed support for introduction of measures to reform and limit the scope of the Patriot Act; 'The Patriot Act should be reformed so Americans' phone records do not get indiscriminately swept up in a federal government database.'

=== Economy ===
Udall voted for the Employee Free Choice Act in 2007, which would have eliminated secret ballot in voting to unionize businesses, and said that he supported the measure because the National Labor Relations Board would be the best forum to deal with concerns raised by the bill's opponents.

On February 10, 2009, Udall voted to pass the American Recovery and Reinvestment Act of 2009. Udall was part of a bipartisan group of 20 senators who negotiated an agreement to set the stimulus bill size to around $600 billion and include $70 billion for the alternative minimum tax.

In December 2010, Udall was one of seven Democrats to have voted against a deal to extend the Bush tax cuts for two years as well as fund unemployment benefits for an additional 13 months, having stated, "Days after the most substantive national conversation we've had about addressing the debt, the debate suddenly has turned to extending tax breaks for millionaires and billionaires that — alone — will cost $700 billion over the next decade."

=== Energy and environment ===
Udall has supported tax breaks for renewable energy and the expansion of national parks. Udall has a lifetime rating of 97% from the League of Conservation Voters.

In 2004, Udall helped lead a statewide ballot initiative (Amendment 37) to adopt the Renewable Electricity Standard, a standard he originally introduced in the Colorado House of Representatives. Working with the Republican Colorado House Speaker, the measure mandating 10% of energy consumed be from renewable sources, passed by a close margin 52% to 48%.

Throughout his career Udall has introduced the "Ski Area Recreational Opportunity Enhancement Act," which was passed in 2011. The act allows ski resorts to offer activities in the summer. In 2009, Udall introduced legislation to address the environmental damage caused by the pine beetle infestation in Colorado's forests, in what Udall described as one of the "biggest natural disasters."

In July 2014, Udall came out in opposition of two Colorado ballot initiative that would have limited hydraulic fracturing, or "fracking," and created an "Environmental Bill of Rights." While his opposition to the initiative aligned him Colorado Governor John Hickenlooper, it put him at odds with the main proponent of the bills and his House district successor, Jared Polis. Udall has repeatedly voted against the Keystone XL pipeline, having said that he wants to wait until a technical review of the project by the State Department is complete.

=== Gun policy ===
One week after the Sandy Hook Elementary School shooting, Colorado Senators Udall and Michael Bennet came out in support of a Federal Assault Weapons Ban. On the issue, Udall commented "if we can save one child in the future from being killed in such a way, I'm ready to push those kinds of policies." On April 17, 2013, Udall supported a failed amendment to expand background checks for gun purchases.

In 2009, Udall upset gun control advocates for supporting an amendment that would have allowed concealed weapons to be transported across state lines. The National Rifle Association (NRA) gave Udall an "F" grade during his time in the House of Representatives. While during his tenure in the Senate, the NRA gave him a "C" grade.

In 2023, Udall said if “in a time machine and going back” he would bring a grim message to himself: “This is going to get worse and worse. More and more people are going to be deeply affected by this.” He would vote for the ban and “take the political heat.”

=== Health policy ===
In December 2009, Udall voted for the Affordable Care Act (also known as Obamacare). Udall has also stated his support for a public option about which he stated, "[t]he reason I support a public option, if it's done in a fiscally responsible way, is it would create competition. Competition drives down cost and what we want to do is make insurance affordable for all Americans."

In November 2013, Udall was critical of the Colorado Division of Insurance concerning the Division's estimates of the number of Colorado residents whose medical insurance was cancelled in response to the requirements of the Affordable Care Act. Udall's office wanted the Division to lower the number from 250,000 because it believed the majority of individuals counted had received renewal options. The Division refused to change the numbers. Administrators at the Colorado Division of Insurance said they felt pressured by members of Udall's staff to change their estimates of policy cancellations. A panel which investigated the matter concluded Udall's office behaved appropriately, however the investigation was criticized because the chair was appointed by Democratic Governor John Hickenlooper; all other members of the panel were selected by the chair, who refused to name the other members of the panel, and left no written records of its investigation.

== Personal life ==
Udall is married to Maggie Fox, an environmental lawyer who previously served as CEO of The Climate Reality Project. The two met while working at Outward Bound, and were married in 1982. They have two children. A golfer, Udall was ranked the 11th best golfer in Congress by Golf Digest in 2011.

Udall has said "there isn't a Coloradan out there who doesn't cycle, hunt, hike... We're an outdoor state. It fits our worldview, and it's how we define ourselves." An experienced mountaineer, Udall has climbed many peaks during his work as an Outward Bound instructor, and in his personal life. Udall has climbed Colorado's 100 tallest peaks, known as "The Colorado Centennials," as well as Kangchenjunga in the Himalayas and Aconcagua, the highest peak in South America. He has also attempted Mount Everest multiple times.

In 1986, Udall and his wife went on a group trek of Mount Garmo. During the climb, Maggie broke her leg, and their fellow climber, Steve Monfredo, died on the mountainside. Udall's 61-year-old brother, Randy Udall, went missing on June 26, 2013, after going on a solo hike in Wyoming's Wind River Range. On July 3, 2013, a body, later identified as that of Randy Udall, was found approximately 80 miles southeast of Grand Teton National Park.

== Electoral history ==
Year	Office	District	Democrat		Republican	
1996	Colorado House of Representatives	13th district	Mark Udall	50%	Drew Bolin	45%
1998	United States House of Representatives	Colorado's 2nd District	Mark Udall	49%	Bob Greenlee	47%
2000	United States House of Representatives	Colorado's 2nd district	Mark Udall	55%	Carolyn Cox	38%
2002	United States House of Representatives	Colorado's 2nd district	Mark Udall	61%	Sandy Hume	37%
2004	United States House of Representatives	Colorado's 2nd district	Mark Udall	67%	Stephen Hackman	30%
2006	United States House of Representatives	Colorado's 2nd district	Mark Udall	68%	Rich Mancuso	28%
2008	United States Senate	Colorado (Class 2)	Mark Udall	52%	Bob Schaffer	42%
2014	United States Senate	Colorado (Class 2)	Mark Udall	46%	Cory Gardner	48%

== See also ==
- Udall family
- Lee-Hamblin family
- Kennedy family

U.S. House of Representatives
Preceded by David Skaggs	Member of the U.S. House of Representatives from Colorado's 2nd congressional district 1999–2009	Succeeded by Jared Polis
Party political offices
Preceded by Tom Strickland	Democratic nominee for U.S. Senator from Colorado (Class 2); 2008, 2014	Succeeded by John Hickenlooper
U.S. Senate
Preceded by Wayne Allard	U.S. Senator (Class 2) from Colorado; 2009–2015; Served alongside: Ken Salazar, Michael Bennet	Succeeded by Cory Gardner
U.S. order of precedence (ceremonial)
Preceded by Hank Brown as Former U.S. Senator	Order of precedence of the United States	Succeeded by Cory Gardner as Former U.S. Senator
