= Don Taylor Udall =

American politician (1897–1976)

Arizona Legislature
- In office 1941–1942

Personal details
- Born: July 20, 1897 Eagar, Arizona Territory
- Died: March 14, 1976 (aged 78) Mesa, Arizona, U.S.
- Party: Democratic
- Spouse: Emily Patterson

Don Taylor Udall (July 20, 1897 – March 14, 1976) was a member of the Arizona State Legislature from the Udall political family.

Born and raised in Arizona, he was the son of David King Udall and Ida Frances (Hunt) Udall.

He graduated from Georgetown University with a law degree, and was admitted to the Arizona Bar in 1923.From 1941–1942 he was a member of the Arizona State Legislature. During World War II, he served as a Lieutenant Colonel in the U.S. Army Judge Advocate Generals Corps, with duty in the South Pacific. In 1945, he was elected to the Navajo Country Superior Court where he served until 1963, while also presiding in Arizona's other county Superior Courts and occasionally sitting on the Arizona Supreme Court.

He died in Mesa, Arizona, in 1976. His wife, Emily Patterson, later died July 19, 1982.
