= John Udal (judge) =

English-born cricketer, antiquarian, author, lawyer and judge

The Honourable John Symonds Udal
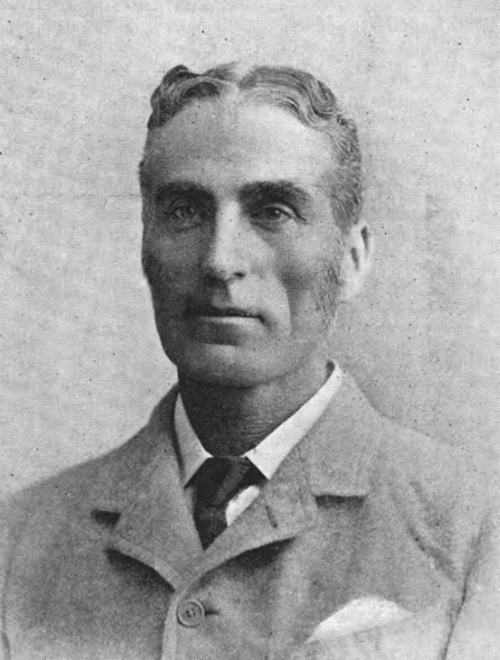
- The Hon. J. S. Udal in 1897

8th Attorney General of Fiji
- In office 1889–1899
- Monarch: Victoria
- Governor: Sir John Thurston; Sir George T. M. O'Brien
- Preceded by: Sir Henry Spencer Berkeley
- Succeeded by: Sir Henry Pollock

Chief Justice of the Leeward Islands
- In office 1900–1911
- Monarch: Victoria
- Governor: Francis Fleming; Sir Henry Jackson

Personal details
- Born: 10 November 1848 West Bromwich, Staffordshire, England
- Died: 13 March 1925 (aged 76) St John's Wood, London, England
- Resting place: Symondsbury, Dorset, England
- Spouse(s): Eva Mary Adelina Routh m. 8 August 1878
- Children: 3 daughters, 2 sons
- Education: Queen's College, Oxford
- Profession: Lawyer, cricketer, author

John Symonds Udal
Cricket information
- Batting: Right-handed
- Bowling: Right-handed
- Role: Batsman

Domestic team information
- Years: Team
- 1871–1875: MCC
- 1895: Fiji
- First-class debut: 24 July 1871 MCC v Sussex
- Last First-class: 22 February 1895 Fiji v Taranaki

Career statistics
Competition	First-class
Matches	9
Runs scored	215
Batting average	13.43
100s/50s	0/1
Top score	50
Balls bowled	6
Wickets	0
Bowling average	–
5 wickets in innings	0
10 wickets in match	0
Best bowling	0/5
Catches/stumpings	3/–
- Source: Cricket Archive, 11 October 2007

John Symonds Udal (10 November 1848 in West Bromwich, Staffordshire, England – 13 March 1925 in London) was an English-born cricketer, antiquarian, author, lawyer and judge. He represented the Fiji national cricket team. He also held government office in Fiji for many years, serving as Attorney-General from 1889 to 1899. He later served as Chief Justice of the Leeward Islands (1900 - 1911).

== Early life and education ==
Educated initially at Bromsgrove School, where he became an accomplished cricketer, Udal went on to train as a barrister at Queen's College, Oxford. He was called to the bar at London's Inner Temple in November 1875, and went on to practice Law on the Western Circuit before becoming Attorney General of Fiji in September 1889. He also became Admiralty Advocate of Fiji.

== Legal career ==
Udal served as Attorney General of Fiji from 1889 to 1899, and as Chief Justice of the Leeward Islands from 1900 to 1911.

While serving as Chief Justice of the Leeward Islands, Udal successfully sued James Townsland Allen, editor of the Montserrat Herald, for libel. On 1 November 1910, Allen was sentenced to nine months' imprisonment after a jury found him guilty on two counts of "wickedly and maliciously contriv[ing] and intend[ing] to scandalise and vilify the said John Symonds Udal in his office of Chief Justice of the said Colony, and to cause it to be believed that the said John Symonds Udal was not a fit and proper person to administer justice in his said office." In particular, the jury condemned Allen for these words: "We as laymen certainly disapprove of His Honour's conduct which to say the least of it was not only ungracious and undignified, but savoured very much of mean cowardice, calculated to bring the administration of justice into contempt."

== Interests ==
A fascination with antiquities, one of Udal's many hobbies, led to an in-depth study of Dorset folklore, customs, and traditions. He was made a member of the Council of the Folklore Society in 1889, and a Fellow of the Society of Antiquaries of London in 1901. His extensive research into Dorset folklore culminated in his work, Dorsetshire Folklore in 1922.

During his time as Chief Justice of the Leeward Islands, Udal was shown a memorial on Nevis to John Pinney, son of Azariah Pinney, formerly of Bettiscombe. This led Udal to believe that the well-known Bettiscombe Skull was that of one of Pinney's slaves. Finding a reference in an old register of slaves on the Pinney estate to "Bettiscombe", he concluded that the skull belonged to a slave named Bettiscombe, who must have been brought to England when or before the Nevis estates were sold. This theory, which Udal published in the Somerset and Dorset Notes and Queries, was disproved long after Udal's death.

== Sporting career ==
A right-handed batsman and bowler, John Udal played minor cricket for Dorset, Somerset and the Free Foresters. He made his first-class debut for the MCC against Sussex in July 1871.

He played a match against "Surrey Club" in July 1873 which was evidently enough to persuade WG Grace to invite him on a tour to Australia, though he was unable to go. He played one final first-class match for the MCC, against Cambridge University in June 1875.

In 1895, whilst Attorney-General of Fiji, he captained the Fiji national cricket team on a tour of New Zealand. He played six further first-class matches on the tour, during which he scored his only first-class half-century against Wellington. He did much to encourage the game in Fiji, doing the same whilst serving as Chief Justice of the Leeward Islands. He later returned to England.

== Family ==
Udal was the second son, and the fourth of nine children born to William Udal and Mary-Anne Symonds, who were cousins. William (born 1802) hailed from Netherbury, where his family had lived for generations. Mary-Anne (born 1817) was from Broadwindsor. William and Mary-Anne then moved to Edgbaston, Birmingham, Staffordshire, where William became a successful businessman.

On 8 August 1878, John Udal married Eva Mary Adelina Routh, with whom he had two sons (Arthur Uvedale and Robin Nicholas) and three daughters (Evelyn Routh, Eva Beatrice, and Ida Vita Isabel). Udal left something of a cricketing dynasty. His son Robin played first-class cricket for Oxford University and the MCC, his grandson Geoffrey played for Middlesex and Leicestershire, whilst his great-great-grandson Shaun has played Test cricket for England.

Udal died suddenly in London, England, on 13 March 1925, and was interred in the churchyard of his hometown of Symondsbury, in Dorset.

Legal offices
Preceded by Sir Henry Spencer Berkeley	Attorney General of Fiji; 1889 — 1899	Succeeded by Sir Henry Pollock
Preceded by	Chief Justice of the Leeward Islands; 1900 — 1911	Succeeded by
