= John Nicholas Udall =

American politician and attorney, mayor of Phoenix, Arizona (1913–2005)

J. Nicholas Udall

44th Mayor of Phoenix
- In office 1948–1952
- Preceded by: Ray Busey
- Succeeded by: Hohen Foster

Personal details
- Born: July 23, 1913 St. Johns, Apache County, Arizona, U.S.
- Died: June 15, 2005 (aged 91) Chandler, Arizona, U.S.
- Party: Democratic
- Spouses: Sybil Webb (died 1998) Joan Romney (m. 2001)
- Children: 7
- Parent(s): John Hunt Udall; Ruth Kimball
- Relatives: Heber C. Kimball (great-grandfather); See Udall family
- Education: The George Washington University Law School (1943)

John Nicholas Udall (July 23, 1913 – June 15, 2005), usually called Nick Udall, was mayor of Phoenix, Arizona from 1948 to 1952. He was a member of the Udall political family and was also a nephew of Spencer W. Kimball, the 12th President of the Church of Jesus Christ of Latter-day Saints.

== Biography ==
Nick Udall (standing left) and other Udall family judges.

Udall was born and raised in Arizona. His parents John Hunt Udall and Ruth Kimball were in the same English literature class at the St. Joseph Stake Academy (now Eastern Arizona College), and when learning about playwright Nicholas Udall, they joked that if they ever got married, that they would name their son Nick, which they did.

Udall attended Brigham Young University and the University of Arizona before enrolling in The George Washington University Law School, graduating in 1943. After graduation, he returned home to Arizona, where he began his law practice.

He followed in his father's footsteps, and served as mayor of Phoenix from 1948 to 1952. He served with then-City Councilman Barry Goldwater. From 1952 to 1956 he served as judge of the Maricopa County Superior Court. Nick left the bench to return to private legal practice at Jennings, Strouss, Salmon & Trask in Phoenix, where he practiced law until retiring in 1992.

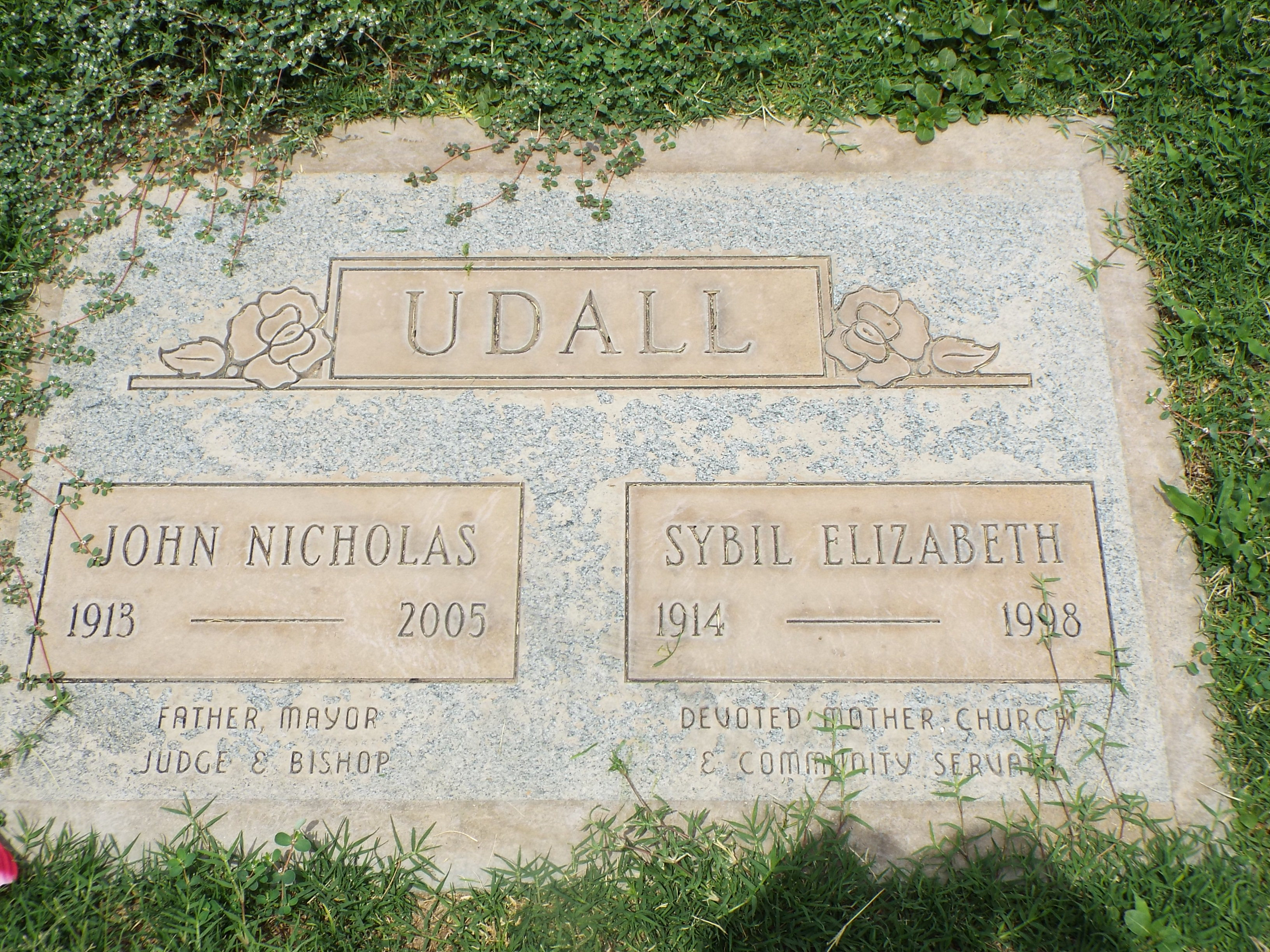
Grave site of Nick and Sybil Udall

A lifelong member of the Church of Jesus Christ of Latter-day Saints, Nick served in various church positions, including service as a full-time missionary in the Eastern Central States mission from 1934 to 1936, as Bishop of the Phoenix Third Ward from 1970 to 1975 ("the most satisfying calling that a worthy priesthood holder can have" because "he is continually helping people"), and as Patriarch of the Phoenix Arizona Stake from 1975 to 1991.

Nick and his wife, Sybil Elizabeth Webb, are the parents of seven children. They are buried alongside each other in Greenwood/Memory Lawn Mortuary & Cemetery in Phoenix, Arizona. Following Sybil's death in 1998, Nick married Joan Romney in 2001.

His autobiography, "The Wonder of It All," was published by FCP Publishing in 2006.

== See also ==
- Udall family

Preceded by Ray Busey	Mayor of Phoenix, Arizona; 1948–1952	Succeeded by Hohen Foster
