= John Hunt Udall =

American politician (1889–1959)

38th Mayor of Phoenix
- In office 1936–1938
- Preceded by: Joseph S. Jenckes
- Succeeded by: Walter J. Thalheimer

Personal details
- Born: August 23, 1889 Snowflake, Arizona Territory
- Died: March 3, 1959 (aged 69) Mesa, Arizona, U.S.
- Party: Republican
- Spouse(s): Ruth Kimball (d. 1915); Leah Smith (1916–1959; his death)

John Hunt Udall (August 23, 1889 – March 3, 1959) was mayor of Phoenix, Arizona from 1936 to 1938. He was a member of the Udall political family.

== Biography ==
The son of David King Udall and Ida Frances (Hunt) Udall, he was born and raised in Arizona. He was a member of the Church of Jesus Christ of Latter-day Saints.

He was a cattleman and farmer.

He married Ruth Kimball, sister of Spencer W. Kimball in 1912. They had a son, Nick. Ruth died in 1915. In 1916, he remarried to Leah Smith, daughter of Jesse Nathaniel Smith. He and Leah had several more children.

In 1922 he was elected as clerk of the Arizona Superior Court, defeating his younger brother Levi Stewart Udall.

From 1936 to 1938 he served as mayor of Phoenix. He also served in the Arizona State Legislature.

He sought, but was defeated for the Republican nomination for Governor of Arizona. In 1948 he was narrowly defeated as the Republican candidate for the U.S. House of Representatives from the Arizona 1st District.

He died in Mesa, Arizona in 1959.

== Legacy ==
His son, Nick Udall served as Mayor of Phoenix from 1948 to 1952.

| Preceded by Joseph S. Jenckes | Mayor of Phoenix, Arizona; 1936–1938 | Succeeded by Walter J. Thalheimer |
