= San Antonio National Cemetery =

Historic veterans cemetery in Bexar County, Texas

- U.S. National Register of Historic Places
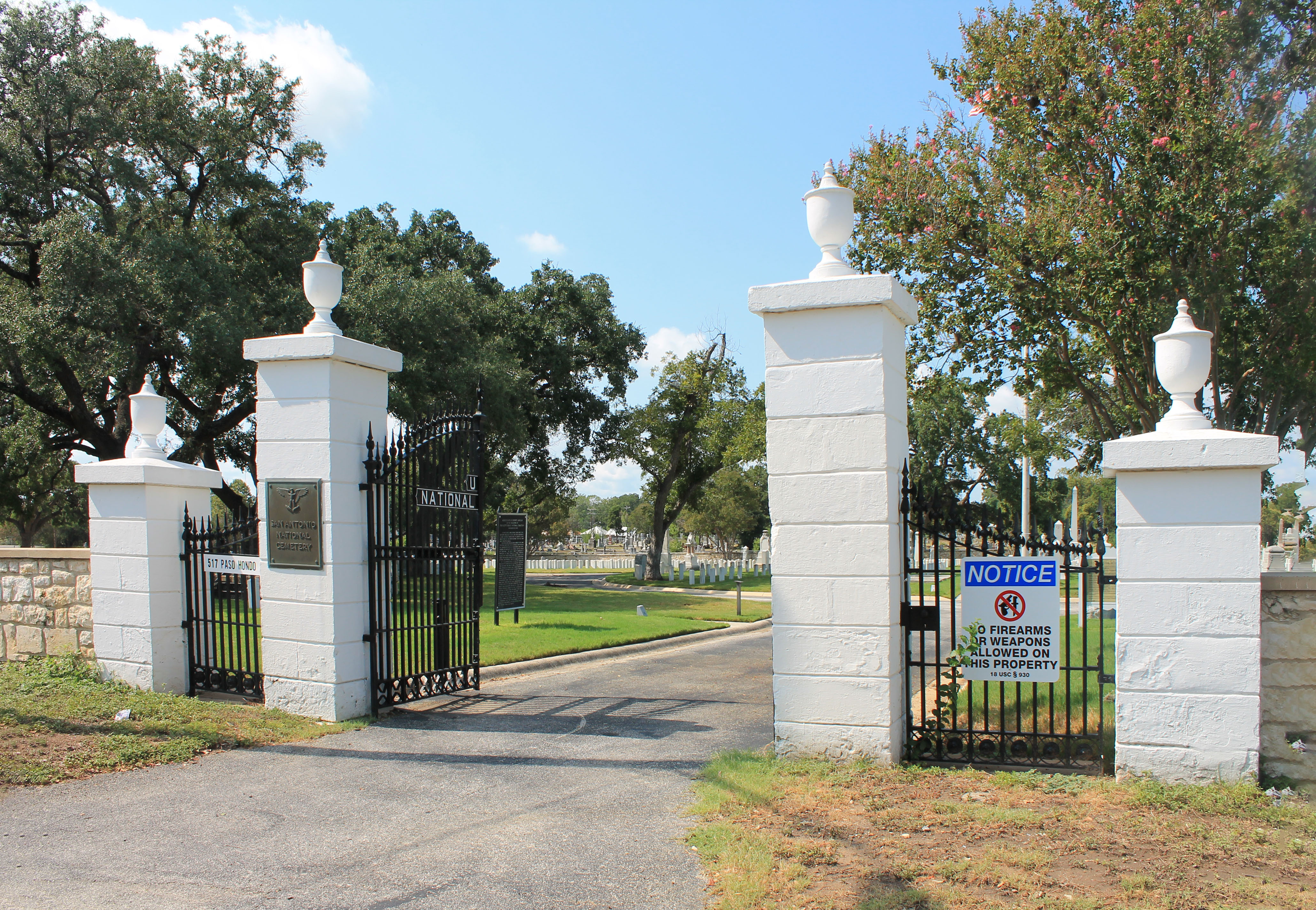
- Location: 517 Paso Hondo St; San Antonio, Texas
- Coordinates: 29°25′18″N 98°28′02″W
- Built: 1867
- MPS: Civil War Era National Cemeteries MPS
- NRHP reference No.: 99001395
- Added to NRHP: November 22, 1999

San Antonio National Cemetery is a United States National Cemetery in the city of San Antonio in Bexar County, Texas. Administered by the United States Department of Veterans Affairs, it encompasses 3.7 acres (1.5 ha), and as of the end of 2005, had 3,163 interments.

== History ==
San Antonio National Cemetery was a part of the city's cemetery, which was deeded to the federal government 1867. The first interments were Civil War Union soldiers reinterred from the city cemetery and outlying cemeteries, over 300 of which are unknown.

San Antonio National Cemetery was listed in the National Register of Historic Places in 1999.

== Notable monuments ==
- A monument dedicated to the unknown dead buried in the cemetery. Erected in 1912.

== Notable interments ==
- Medal of Honor recipients
  - Private David B. Barkley, for action in World War I.
  - Private Frederick Deetline, for action at the Battle of Little Big Horn during the Indian Wars.
  - Sergeant Henry Falcott, for action in Arizona Territory during the Indian Wars.
  - Private John Harrington, for action in the Indian Wars.
  - Corporal Henry A. McMasters, for action in the Indian Wars.
  - Private James J. Nash, for action in the Spanish–American War.
  - Private Solon D. Neal, for action in the Indian Wars.
  - Private Simon Suhler, a.k.a. Charles Gardner, for action in Arizona Territory during the Indian Wars.
  - First Lieutenant Lewis Warrington, for action in the Indian Wars.
- Four Medal of Honor recipients, whose burial locations are unknown, are honored at the cemetery with cenotaphs
  - Private William H. Barnes, for action at the Battle of Chaffin's Farm in the Civil War.
  - Sergeant William De Armond, for action in the Indian Wars.
  - Corporal John J. Given, for action in the Indian Wars.
  - Private George W. Smith, for action in the Indian Wars.
- Other notable interments
  - Brigadier General John L. Bullis, Civil War era military officer of 118th & 41st United States Colored Infantry, later as an officer in the 24th Infantry Regiment, a prominent Buffalo Soldier regiment, and commander of the famed Black Seminole scouts in Texas. Camp Bullis in San Antonio, TX is named for him.
  - Lieutenant Eugene M. Bradley, first person who died at an airfield in Windsor Locks, CT. Airfield was renamed for him. Originally named Bradley Field, its name was changed to Bradley International Airport (BDL).
  - Second Lieutenant George Edward Maurice Kelly, namesake of Kelly Air Force Base.
  - Gustav Schleicher, US Congressman.
  - Private Harry M. Wurzbach in Spanish–American War, as US Congressman served 1921 until his death 1931.
- Other noteworthy interments
  - Captain Solon McAdoo, leader of Belknap Rifles, at outbreak of Spanish–American War the group enlisted as Company F, First Texas Volunteer Infantry, under McAdoo, who died of fever.
  - Private Prince Romerson, a Hawaiian who fought in the Civil War and as a Buffalo Soldier.
  - Brigadier General Robert Francis Catterson American civil war general, physician and later United States Marshall.
  - 281 Buffalo Soldiers

== See also ==
- Old San Antonio City Cemeteries Historic District
- San Antonio Confederate Cemetery
