= Christopher C. Upson =

American politician and lawyer (1829–1902)

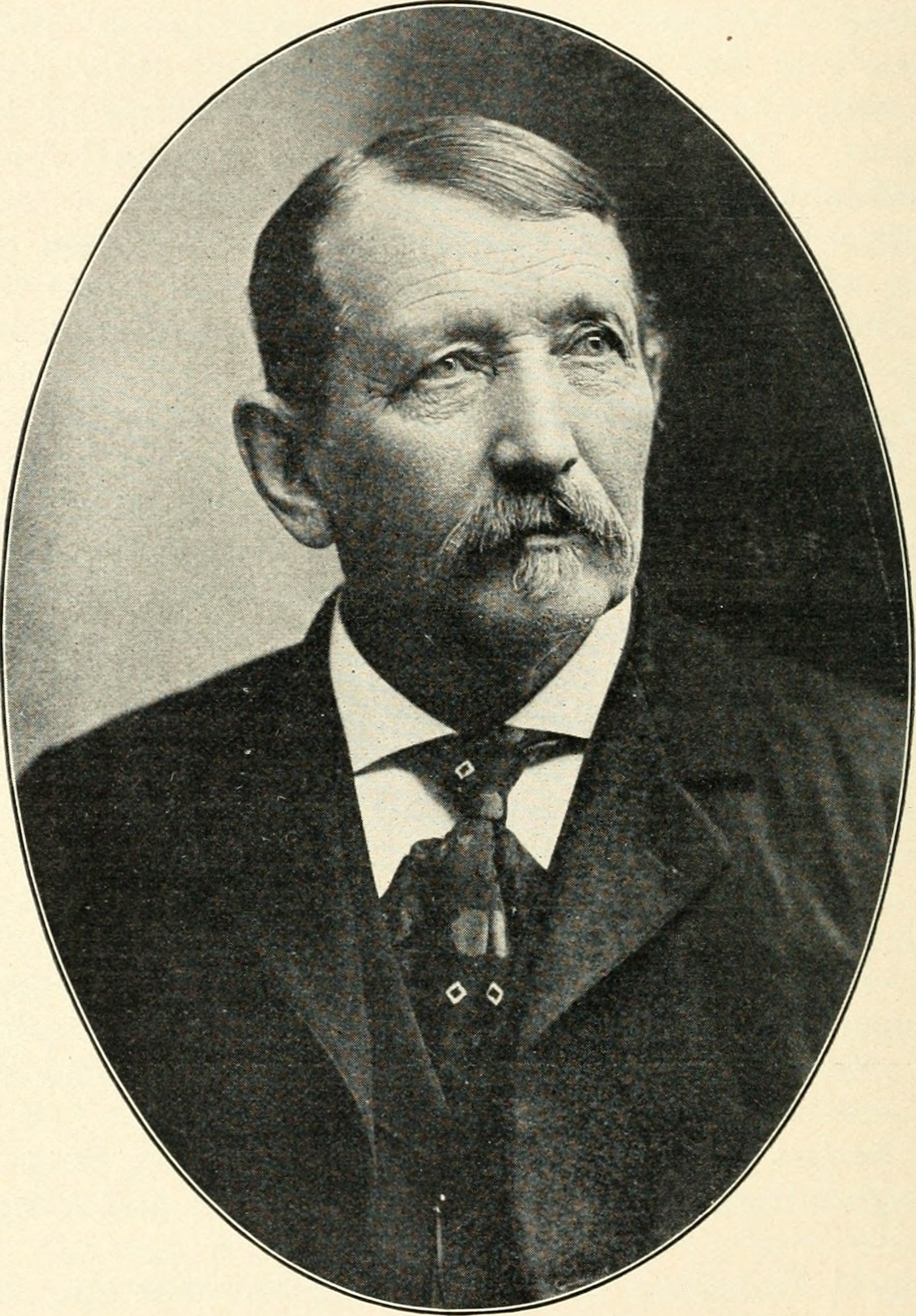
- Upson in a 1910 publication

Member of the U.S. House of Representatives from Texas's 6th district
- In office April 15, 1879 – March 3, 1883
- Preceded by: Gustav Schleicher
- Succeeded by: Olin Wellborn

Associate Justice of the Arizona Territorial Supreme Court
- In office 1862

Personal details
- Born: Christopher Columbus Upson; 17 October 1829 Syracuse, New York, US
- Died: 8 February 1902 (aged 72) San Antonio, Texas, US
- Resting place: San Antonio City Cemetery No. 1 or San Antonio Confederate Cemetery
- Party: Democratic Party
- Relations: Upson family
- Occupation: Politician, lawyer

Military service
- Allegiance: Confederate States of America
- Branch/service: Confederate States Army
- Rank: Colonel
- Battles/wars: American Civil War

Christopher Columbus Upson (October 17, 1829 – February 8, 1902) was an American politician and lawyer. A Democrat, he was a member of the United States House of Representatives from Texas. Born in New York, he served in the Confederate States Army during the American Civil War.

== Early life and education ==
Upson was born on October 17, 1829, near Syracuse, New York, the son of Oren Upson and Betsy Snow (née Wilson) Upson. He was presumably named for Christopher Columbus. He was a member of the Upson family.

Educated at common schools between New York and Boston, Upson later studied at Williams College. According to Charles Anderson, he lived in Buffalo for some time. He read law, and in 1851, was admitted to the bar, after which he began practicing in Syracuse.

== Career ==
In 1854, Upson moved to Castroville, Texas, and in 1859 moved to San Antonio, practicing law in both. During the American Civil War, he served in the Confederate States Army, as an aide-de-camp to William H. C. Whiting, being ranked colonel. In 1862, he was appointed associate justice of the Arizona Territorial Supreme Court.

Days before the war ended, Upson was tasked with transporting $20,000,000 in Confederate States dollars, from Richmond, Virginia, to San Antonio. While traveling, a warrant for his arrest was issued and he was followed by Union men. It was speculated that Jefferson Davis planned to move the capital of the Confederate States of America to San Antonio.

Upson was a Democrat. He was a Presidential elector in the 1876 election. Following the death of Gustav Schleicher, he was elected to the United States House of Representatives, being re-elected to the following Congress. He served from April 15, 1879, to March 3, 1883, representing Texas's 6th district. He was not nominated for the following election. Ideologically, he leaned liberal.

After serving in Congress, Upson returned to practicing law in San Antonio. On October 6, 1896, he gave a speech for the unveiling of the Confederate monument in Travis Park. An admirer of Queen Victoria, he once wrote a poem for her and spent an evening with she and the British royal family.

== Personal life and death ==
On December 27, 1865, Upson married Martha Vance. In 1876, he purchased the Upson Ranch in Denton, a property previously owned by Robert Neighbors. He was described as "colorful" and "flamboyant". He died on February 8, 1902, aged 72, in San Antonio, from illness. His obituary in The New York Times erroneously gave his middle name as "Axx".

Upson was buried either at San Antonio City Cemetery No. 1, or the San Antonio Confederate Cemetery. A collection of his papers is held by the Daughters of the Republic of Texas Library. Another collection is held by the Williams College Archives Repository.

U.S. House of Representatives
| Preceded by Gustave Schleicher | Member of the U.S. House of Representatives from Texas's 6th congressional district April 15, 1879 – March 3, 1883 | Succeeded by Olin Wellborn |
