= Lewis Warrington =

Lewis Warrington may refer to:

- Lewis Warrington (United States Navy officer), officer during the Barbary Wars and the War of 1812
- Lewis Warrington (Medal of Honor), American officer in the U.S. Army
- Lewis Warrington (footballer), English footballer
