= James Wood Bush =

American Union navy sailor of British and Native Hawaiian descent

- Born: c. 1844–45; Honolulu, Oʻahu, Kingdom of Hawaiʻi
- Died: April 24, 1906 (aged 61–62); Kealia, Kauaʻi, Territory of Hawaii
- Relatives: John E. Bush (brother)
- Military career
- Allegiance: United States; Union
- Branch: Union navy
- Service years: 1864–65
- Conflicts: American Civil War

James Wood Bush (c. 1844–45 – April 24, 1906) was an American Union navy sailor of British and Native Hawaiian descent. He was among a group of more than one hundred Native Hawaiian and Hawaii-born combatants in the American Civil War, at a time when the Kingdom of Hawaii was still an independent nation.

Enlisting in the Union navy in 1864, Bush served as a sailor aboard USS Vandalia and the captured Confederate vessel USS Beauregard, which maintained the blockade of the ports of the Confederacy. He was discharged from service in 1865 after an injury, which developed into a chronic condition in later life. The impoverished Bush was unable to return to Hawaii for more than a decade, during which time he traveled through New England and much of the Pacific. Back in Hawaii, he worked as a government tax collector and road supervisor for the island of Kauai, where he settled down. In later life, he converted to Mormonism and became an active member of the Hawaiian Mission. After the annexation of Hawaii to the United States, Bush was recognized for his military service, and in 1905 was granted a government pension for the injuries he received in the Navy. He died at his home on Kauai on April 24, 1906.

For a long period after the Civil War, the legacy and contributions of Bush and other documented Hawaiian participants were largely forgotten except in the private circles of descendants and historians. There has been a revival of interest, especially through the efforts of his great-grandniece Edna Bush Ellis and others in the Hawaiian community. In 2010, the "Hawaiʻi Sons of the Civil War" were commemorated with a bronze plaque erected along the memorial pathway at the National Memorial Cemetery of the Pacific in Honolulu.

== Early life ==
James Wood Bush was born in Honolulu, on the island of Oahu. The date of his birth is uncertain; sources claim it to be October 1844, 1845, or 1847–1848. The 1900 United States census records his birth date as November 1845. He was the son of George Henry Bush, a native of Suffolk, England, who settled in Hawaii in 1825, and his Hawaiian wife. Bush was thus of mixed Native Hawaiian and Caucasian descent, known as hapa haole in Hawaiian, although in the United States he was referred to as a "half-caste". His older brother was John Edward Bush, who became a newspaper publisher and politician, serving as royal governor of Kauaʻi and a cabinet minister under the reign of King Kalākaua. Little is known about Bush's life before 1864. Like his brother, he began his career as a sailor working on either merchant or whaling ships in the Pacific. Hawaiian sailors were highly regarded in the 18th- and 19th-century maritime industry.

== American Civil War ==
After the outbreak of the American Civil War, the Kingdom of Hawaiʻi, under King Kamehameha IV, declared its neutrality on August 26, 1861. Some Native Hawaiians and Hawaiian-born Americans (mainly descendants of American missionaries) both abroad and in the islands volunteered to enlist in the military regiments of various states in the Union and the Confederacy. Individual Native Hawaiians had been serving in the United States Navy and Army since the War of 1812, and more served during the Civil War. Many Hawaiians sympathized with the Union because of Hawaiʻi's ties to New England through its missionaries and the whaling industries, and the ideological opposition of many to the institution of slavery.

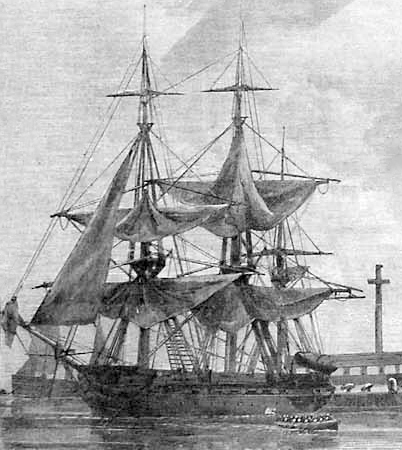
Bush served as a sailor on USS Vandalia during the war.

Arriving in New England at the beginning of the war, Bush enlisted at Portsmouth, New Hampshire, for a three-year term as an "ordinary seaman" on September 27, 1864. During his service, he worked on USS Vandalia and later the captured Confederate vessel USS Beauregard, which chased blockade runners off West Florida as part of the squadrons responsible for maintaining the blockade of the ports of the Confederacy. He developed chronic laryngitis and spinal injuries due to his service in the Union navy and was discharged in September 1865 at the Brooklyn Naval Hospital. When the war ended, the impoverished Bush had no way of returning to Hawaii. For the next decade, he lived in New Bedford, San Francisco, and Tahiti, finally returning to Hawaii in 1877. In 1905, after Hawaii became a US territory, Bush was granted a pension for his service in the Civil War, with back pensions dating from May 8, 1897.

== Later life ==
After returning to Hawaii, Bush settled on the island of Kauai. In 1880, he was listed as the tax collector of Kawaihau, Kauai. In 1882, his older brother, in his capacity as Minister of the Interior, appointed Bush the Road Supervisor for the District of Hanalei to replace Christian Bertlemann, who had resigned. In 1887, Bush converted to Mormonism and was ordained an elder after two years, undertaking missionary work in the islands. He became the bishop of the Latter-day Saints ward in Kealia and hosted Mormon historian Andrew Jenson during his 1895 visit to Kauai. In around 1894, Bush married a young Hawaiian girl named Sarah Kaloaaole Makahi (1879–1963) at Lahaina, traveling to Kona after their marriage.

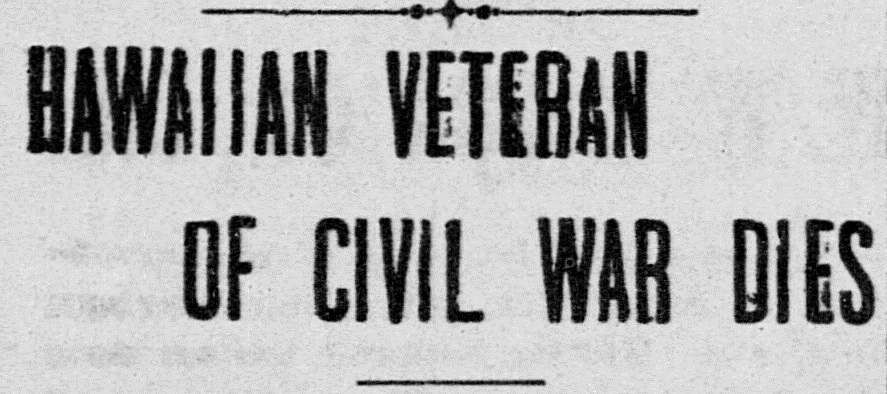
"Hawaiian Veteran of Civil War Dies", Bush's death announcement in The Pacific Commercial Advertiser, 1906

Bush died of heart failure at Kealia, Kauai, on April 24, 1906. In the last years of his life, he was a janitor at the Kealia prison. He was survived by his wife Sarah and son James Jr. Lorenzo Taylor, writing for the Deseret News shortly after Bush's death, said, "[H]e has taken an active part in the missionary work, doing much good among his fellow men. He has also been very kind to the elders, and his doors were always open to them. He was greatly beloved and respected by all who knew him. His life was a noble example of faithful and untiring devotion to the Gospel." Bush is believed to be buried on Kauai, but the location of his grave is uncertain. According to Anita Manning, an Associate in Cultural Studies at Bishop Museum, "even the family can't find him".

== Legacy ==
After the war, the military service of Hawaiians, including James Wood Bush and many others, was largely forgotten, disappearing from the collective memories of the American Civil War and the history of Hawaii. Hawaiian residents, historians, and descendants of Hawaiian combatants in the conflict have insisted on the need to remember the legacy of the Hawaiians who fought. Renewed interest in the stories of these individuals and this particular period of Hawaiian-American history has inspired efforts to preserve the memories of the Hawaiians who served in the war.

Stating that "our boys from Hawaii" should be remembered, Bush's great-grandniece Edna Bush Ellis was influential in reviving interest and in the effort to install a memorial recognizing their legacy. On August 26, 2010, on the anniversary of the signing of the Hawaiian Neutrality Proclamation, a bronze plaque was erected along the memorial pathway at the National Memorial Cemetery of the Pacific in Honolulu recognizing the "Hawaiʻi Sons of the Civil War", the more than one hundred Hawaiians who were documented as serving during the American Civil War for both the Union and the Confederacy. As of 2014, researchers have identified 119 documented Native Hawaiian and Hawaii-born combatants from historical records. The exact number still remains unclear because many Hawaiians enlisted and served under Anglicized names, and little is known about them due to the lack of detailed records.

In 2015, the sesquicentennial of the end of the American Civil War, the National Park Service released the publication Asians and Pacific Islanders and the Civil War about the service of the many combatants of Asian and Pacific Islander descent who fought during the war. The history of Hawaii's involvement and the biographies of Bush and others were written by historians Anita Manning, Justin Vance, and others.

== See also ==
- Hawaii and the American Civil War

== Bibliography ==
Books and journals

- Grzyb, Frank L. (2016). The Last Civil War Veterans: The Lives of the Final Survivors, State by State. Jefferson, NC: McFarland & Company, Inc. ISBN 978-1-4766-2488-4. OCLC 946085079.
- Kuykendall, Ralph Simpson (1953). The Hawaiian Kingdom 1854–1874, Twenty Critical Years. Vol. 2. Honolulu: University of Hawaii Press. ISBN 978-0-87022-432-4. OCLC 226356000. Archived from the original on December 13, 2014.
- Manning, Anita; Vance, Justin W. (2014). "Hawaiʻi at Home During the American Civil War". The Hawaiian Journal of History. 47: 145–170. hdl:10524/47259. OCLC 60626541.
- Manning, Anita (2013). "Keaupuni: A Hawaiian Sailor's Odyssey". The Hawaiian Journal of History. 47: 87–102. hdl:10524/36267. OCLC 60626541.
- Schmitt, Robert C. (1998). "Hawaiʻi's War Veterans and Battle Deaths". The Hawaiian Journal of History. 32: 171–174. hdl:10524/521. OCLC 60626541.
- Shively, Carol A., ed. (2015). "Pacific Islanders and the Civil War". Asians and Pacific Islanders and the Civil War. Washington, DC: National Park Service. pp. 130–163. ISBN 978-1-59091-167-9. OCLC 904731668.
  - Vance, Justin; Manning, Anita. Introduction. In Shively (2015), pp. 132–135.
  - Vance, Justin; Manning, Anita. "James Wood Bush". In Shively (2015), p. 158.
  - Vance, Justin; Manning, Anita. "The Impact of the Civil War on the Kingdom of Hawaii". In Shively (2015), pp. 161–163.
- Vance, Justin W.; Manning, Anita (October 2012). "The Effects of the American Civil War on Hawaiʻi and the Pacific World". World History Connected. 9 (3). Archived from the original on August 26, 2015.

Newspapers and online sources

- Burlingame, Burl (August 26, 2008). "Reviving History". Honolulu Star-Bulletin. Honolulu. Archived from the original on August 26, 2011.
- "Bush, John Edward office record". Hawaii State Archives digital collections. state of Hawaii. Archived from the original on April 3, 2012.
- Cole, William (February 23, 2014). "Civil War Veteran's Grave Will Remain Unmarked". Honolulu Star-Advertiser. Honolulu. Archived from the original on July 3, 2020 – via Questia.
- Cole, William (May 31, 2010). "Native Hawaiians served on both sides during Civil War". Honolulu Star-Advertiser. Honolulu. Archived from the original on February 17, 2016.
- Damon, Ethel M. (April 1, 1941). "Punahou Volunteers of 1863". The Friend. Vol. CXI, no. 4. Honolulu. p. 67. Archived from the original on June 4, 2016.
- Davis, Chelsea (October 26, 2014). "Hawaiian Civil War soldier finally recognized". Hawaii News Now. Archived from the original on August 22, 2015.
- Foenander, Terry; Milligan, Edward; et al. (March 2015). "Hawaiians in the Civil War" (PDF). National Park Service. Archived from the original (PDF) on November 23, 2015.
- "Gets Pension". The Hawaiian Star. Vol. XIII, no. 4132. Honolulu. June 19, 1905. p. 2. Archived from the original on December 9, 2014.
- Hawaiʻi Pacific University (July 15, 2015). "HPU partners with National Park Service, Hawaii Civil War Round Table for July 17 talk". HPU News. Archived from the original on July 20, 2015.
- "Hawaiian Veteran of Civil War Dies". The Pacific Commercial Advertiser. Vol. XLIII, no. 7399. Honolulu. April 26, 1906. p. 11. Archived from the original on December 9, 2014.
- Jenson, Andrew (1895). "Jenson's Travel – Letter No XVII". The Deseret Weekly. Salt Lake City. pp. 524–525.
- Lewis, Keisha (February 14, 2014). "HPU prof speaks at National Prisoner of War Museum". Kalamalama. Honolulu. Archived from the original on October 14, 2015.
- "Local Brevities". The Pacific Commercial Advertiser. Vol. XX, no. 3848. Honolulu. November 21, 1894. p. 7. Archived from the original on December 9, 2014.
- "Local Brevities". The Pacific Commercial Advertiser. Vol. III, no. 129. Honolulu. June 18, 1905. p. 12. Archived from the original on August 10, 2014.
- "Message from the Interior Office". The Pacific Commercial Advertiser. Vol. XXVII, no. 14. Honolulu. September 30, 1882. p. 2. Archived from the original on August 16, 2018.
- "Sale By Order of the Supreme Court". The Polynesian. Vol. XIX, no. 47. Honolulu. March 21, 1863. p. 3. Archived from the original on August 10, 2014.
- "Tax Collectors for 1880". The Pacific Commercial Advertiser. Vol. XXV, no. 10. Honolulu. September 4, 1880. p. 3. Archived from the original on March 6, 2016.
- Taylor, Lorenzo (1906). "A Native Elder Dies". Elder's Journal of the Southern States Mission. Vol. 3. Chattanooga, TN. p. 359.
- Taylor, Lorenzo (1906). Anderson, Edward H. (ed.). "Events and Comments: James W. Bush Dead". The Improvement Era. Vol. 9. Salt Lake City. p. 827.
- "Two New Divorce Cases". The Pacific Commercial Advertiser. Vol. XXXII, no. 5650. Honolulu. September 14, 1900. p. 7. Archived from the original on December 9, 2014.
