= Keālia, Hawaii =

Unincorporated community in Hawaii, United States

Keālia
- Unincorporated community
- Location within the state of Hawaii
- Coordinates: 22°6′7″N 159°18′31″W
- Country: United States
- State: Hawaii
- County: Kauaʻi
- Elevation: 16 ft (4.9 m)

Population (2020)
  - Total: 103
- Time zone: UTC−10 (Hawaii–Aleutian)
- ZIP codes: 96751
- GNIS feature ID: 360952

Keālia (literally, "the salt encrustation" in Hawaiian) is an unincorporated community on the island of Kauaʻi in Kauaʻi County, Hawaii, United States. Its elevation is 16 feet (5 m). The Board on Geographic Names officially designated it "Kealia" in 1914. It has a post office with the ZIP code 96751. James Wood Bush, a Hawaiian veteran of the American Civil War and later Mormon convert was a resident of Kealia.
