= Prince Romerson =

19th-century American Civil War Union soldier

- Born: c. 1840; Hawaii Island, Kingdom of Hawaii
- Died: March 30, 1872 (aged 31–32); Fort Griffin, Texas, United States
- Burial place: San Antonio National Cemetery
- Military career
- Allegiance: United States; Union
- Branch: Union navy Union army United States Army
- Service years: 1863–72
- Rank: Sergeant
- Units: 5th Regiment Massachusetts Colored Volunteer Cavalry; 25th United States Infantry Regiment
- Conflicts: American Civil War; American Indian Wars

Prince Romerson (c. 1840 – March 30, 1872) was a Union army soldier of Native Hawaiian descent. One of the "Hawaiʻi Sons of the Civil War", he was among a group of more than 100 documented Native Hawaiian and Hawaii-born combatants who fought in the American Civil War while the Kingdom of Hawaii was still an independent nation.

Living in the American Northeast before the war, Romerson enlisted in the Union navy in 1863 as part of the Blockading Squadrons responsible for maintaining the blockade of the ports of the Confederacy. After being discharged from naval service, he reenlisted in the Union army under the 5th Regiment Massachusetts Colored Volunteer Cavalry, a United States Colored (USCT) regiment, and was promoted to the rank of sergeant on June 1, 1864. Romerson fought with the 5th USCC until the end of the war. Illness prevented him from continuing with his regiment's reassignment to Clarksville, Texas, and he was mustered out in 1865. After the war, like many former USCT veterans, he remained in the army on the frontier as one of the Buffalo Soldiers. He died in 1872.

Romerson's military career shows the diverse attitudes of officers to the Native Hawaiians and people of color who served on segregated units during and shortly after the Civil War. In 2010, the Hawaiʻi Sons of the Civil War were commemorated with a bronze plaque erected along the memorial pathway at the National Memorial Cemetery of the Pacific in Honolulu.

== Context ==
After the outbreak of the American Civil War, King Kamehameha IV declared the Kingdom of Hawaii's neutrality on August 26, 1861. Despite this stance of neutrality, many Native Hawaiians and Hawaii-born Americans (mainly descendants of American missionaries) abroad and in the islands acted independently and enlisted in the military regiments of various states in the Union and the Confederacy. Native Hawaiian participation in American wars was not unheard of; Native Hawaiians had served in the United States Navy and Army since the War of 1812, and even more fought during the American Civil War. There were varying reasons for joining the war. Hawaiians abroad often sought economic gains and adventures through their enlistment. These included the unemployed sailors on whaling ships who joined the Union navy and sailors on whaling ships captured by the Confederate Navy who served on the CSS Shenandoah. There was also an ideological sympathy for the cause of the war. Many Hawaiians sympathized with the Union because of Hawaii's ties to New England through missionaries and the whaling industry, and the opposition of many people in the islands to slavery.

== Life ==
Prince Romerson was born around 1840, but little is known about his life before the war. There is no indication that his first name denotes any royal status, and his surname was often listed as "Robinson". Different versions of his enlistment records noted his birthplace as "Owyhee, Sandwich Island" (the island of Hawaii (Note: Also interpreted as Oahu or "Nyhee".)), or "India". There is also disagreement over his ethnicity. Some Filipino historians have claimed him as one of their own, and he is included in lists of Filipino American Civil War combatants.

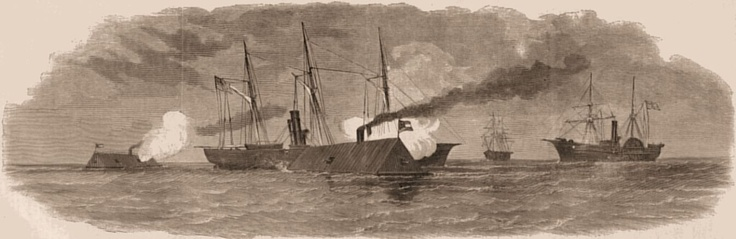
The Union Blockading Fleet engaging Confederate Rams off the coast of South Carolina, 1863

Romerson worked as a barber before his enlistment in 1863. It is thought that he came to the United States as a sailor aboard a merchant or whaling ship in the Pacific; Hawaiian sailors were highly regarded in the 18th- and 19th-century maritime industry and sought out as crew members. Regardless, it is known that Romerson was living in New York prior to joining the Navy. Probably helped by his experience at sea, he enlisted on January 22, 1863, as a landsman in the Union navy. He served on USS Wamsutta and USS Mercedita as part of the Blockading Squadrons, responsible for maintaining the blockade of the ports of the Confederate States.

After serving in the Navy for a year, Romerson joined as a private in Company M of the 5th Regiment Massachusetts Colored Volunteer Cavalry. Led by Lieutenant Cornelius Kaler, Company M was the last be mustered in on May 5, 1865. Like most Native Hawaiians who participated in the war, Romerson was assigned to the colored regiments probably because of his dark skin color and the military's segregation policy. Romerson is one of the few Hawaiian soldiers of the Civil War whose real name is known; many combatants served under anglicized pseudonyms (nom de guerre) because they were easier for English-speaking Americans to pronounce than Hawaiian names. They were often registered as kanakas, the 19th-century term for Hawaiians and Pacific Islanders, with the "Sandwich Islands" (i.e. Hawaii) noted as their place of origin. Serving in the same regiment was another Hawaiian soldier named Charles Heatley.

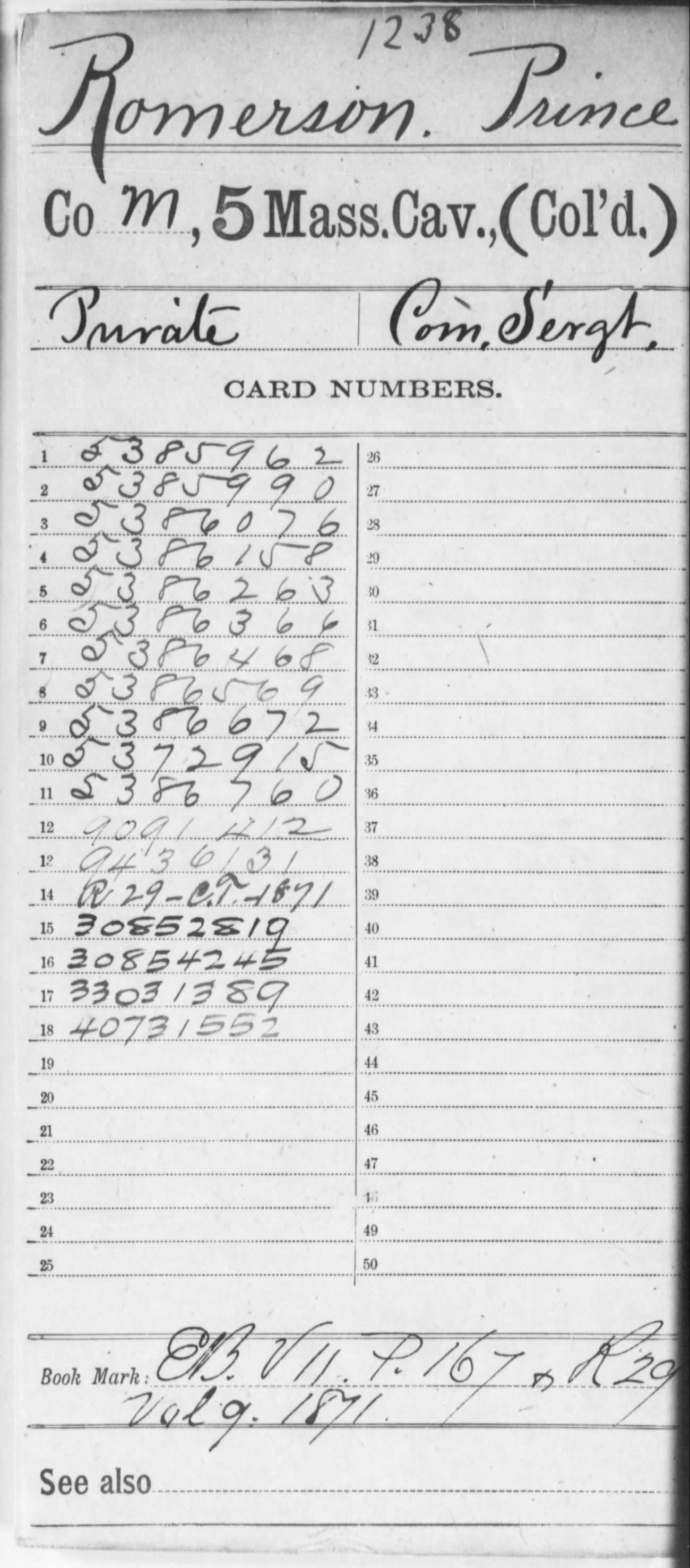
Enlistment card for Prince Romerson

Historian Ruthanne Lum McCunn noted, "The military records of Hawaii-born Prince Romerson reveal both his service [with] the US and the diverse attitudes of officers toward people of color." Romerson was quickly promoted to sergeant on June 1, 1864, possibly because he was literate. Romerson fought with his regiment at the Second Battle of Petersburg and took part in the Richmond–Petersburg Campaign, better-known as the siege of Petersburg. He also served as a guard for the Union prison camp for Confederates at Camp Lookout, Maryland. Between the Union victory at Appomattox and the 5th Regiment's reassignment to Clarksville, Texas, Romerson fell ill and was sent to the Corps d'Afrique USA General Hospital in New Orleans on July 8, 1865. Never recovering sufficiently to rejoin his regiment, he was transferred to De Camp USA General Hospital, Davids Island, New York, before being mustered out on October 9, 1865.

In the post-war period, Romerson sought to rejoin the military, and in 1867 he enlisted in the 39th United States Infantry Regiment at the reduced rank of private. The 39th later consolidated with the 40th to create the 25th United States Infantry Regiment. A racially segregated unit of the United States Army, its personnel were dubbed "Buffalo Soldiers" and included many Civil War veterans from colored regiments such as the 5th USCC. Romerson served in the 25th for a full three-year term fighting in the American Indian Wars along the Texas frontier. He died on March 30, 1872, possibly at Fort Griffin, where he was initially buried. On May 11, 1872, he was re-interred at the San Antonio National Cemetery.

== Legacy ==
Prince Romerson's service in the war illustrated one of the many examples of Hawaiian recruits assigned to segregated regiments and the diverse attitude towards them. McCunn noted, "Indisputable is his commitment to honorable service." After the war, the military service of Hawaiians, including Prince Romerson and many others, was largely forgotten, disappearing from the collective memories of the American Civil War and the history of Hawaii. In recent years, Hawaiian residents, historians, and descendants of Hawaiian combatants in the conflict have insisted on the need to remember "our boys from Hawaii". Renewed interest in the stories of these individuals and this particular period of Hawaiian-American history has inspired efforts to preserve the memories of the Hawaiians who served in the war. On August 26, 2010, on the anniversary of the signing of the Hawaiian Neutrality Proclamation, a bronze plaque was erected along the memorial pathway at the National Memorial Cemetery of the Pacific in Honolulu recognizing these Hawaiʻi Sons of the Civil War, the more than 100 documented Hawaiians who served during the American Civil War for both the Union and the Confederacy. As of 2014, researchers have identified 119 documented Native Hawaiian and Hawaii-born combatants from historical records. The exact number still remains unclear because many Hawaiians enlisted and served under anglicized pseudonyms, and little is known about them due to the lack of detailed records.

In 2015, the sesquicentennial of the end of the American Civil War, the National Park Service released a publication entitled Asians and Pacific Islanders and the Civil War. It concerned the service of the large number of combatants of Asian and Pacific Islander descent who fought during the war. The history of Hawaii's involvement and the biographies of Romerson and others were written by historians Ruthanne Lum McCunn, Anita Manning and Justin Vance.

== See also ==
- Hawaii and the American Civil War

== Bibliography ==
- Bautista, Veltisezar B. (2002). The Filipino Americans (1763–present): Their History, Culture and Traditions. Naperville, IL: Bookhaus Publishers. ISBN 978-0-931613-17-3. OCLC 50325908.
- Cox, Christopher (2013). History of Massachusetts Civil War Regiments: Artillery, Cavalry, and Infantry. Raleigh, NC: Lulu Publishing. ISBN 978-1-304-46992-2. OCLC 897834743.
- Dyer, Frederick H. (1908). A Compendium of the War of the Rebellion. Vol. 1. Des Moines, IA: The Dyer Publishing Company. p. 1240. OCLC 8697590.
- Grzyb, Frank L. (2016). The Last Civil War Veterans: The Lives of the Final Survivors, State by State. Jefferson, NC: McFarland & Company, Inc., Publishers. ISBN 978-1-4766-2488-4. OCLC 934885367.
- Kuykendall, Ralph Simpson (1953). The Hawaiian Kingdom 1854–1874, Twenty Critical Years. Vol. 2. Honolulu: University of Hawaii Press. ISBN 978-0-87022-432-4. OCLC 47010821.
- Manning, Anita; Vance, Justin W. (2014). "Hawaiʻi at Home During the American Civil War". Hawaiian Journal of History. 47. Honolulu: Hawaiian Historical Society: 145–170. hdl:10524/47259. OCLC 60626541.
- Massachusetts. Adjutant General's Office (1933). Massachusetts Soldiers, Sailors, and Marines in the Civil War. Vol. VI. Norwood, MA: Norwood Press. OCLC 11485612.
- Mercene, Floro L. (2007). Manila Men in the New World: Filipino Migration to Mexico and the Americas from the Sixteenth Century. Diliman, Quezon City: University of the Philippines Press. ISBN 978-971-542-529-2. OCLC 154714440.
- Okihiro, Gary (2015). American History Unbound: Asians and Pacific Islanders. Oakland: University of California Press. ISBN 978-0-520-96030-5. OCLC 914255697.
- Raphael-Hernandez, Heike; Steen, Shannon (2006). AfroAsian Encounters: Culture, History, Politics. New York: New York University Press. p. 321. ISBN 978-0-8147-7581-3. OCLC 181536004.
- Schmitt, Robert C. (1998). "Hawaiʻi's War Veterans and Battle Deaths". Hawaiian Journal of History. 32. Honolulu: Hawaiian Historical Society: 171–174. hdl:10524/521. OCLC 60626541.
- Shively, Carol A., ed. (2015). "Pacific Islanders and the Civil War". Asians and Pacific Islanders and the Civil War. Washington, DC: National Park Service. pp. 130–163. ISBN 978-1-59091-167-9. OCLC 904731668.
  - McCunn, Ruthanne Lum. "Prince Romerson". In Shively (2015), pp. 142–145.
  - Vance, Justin; Manning, Anita. "The Impact of the Civil War on the Kingdom of Hawaii". In Shively (2015), pp. 161–163.
- Vance, Justin W.; Manning, Anita (October 2012). "The Effects of the American Civil War on Hawai'i and the Pacific World". World History Connected. 9 (3). Champaign: University of Illinois.

Newspapers and online sources

- Burlingame, Burl (August 26, 2008). "Reviving History". Honolulu Star-Bulletin. Honolulu.
- Cole, William (May 31, 2010). "Native Hawaiians served on both sides during Civil War". Honolulu Star-Advertiser. Honolulu. Archived from the original on February 17, 2016.
- Davis, Chelsea (October 26, 2014). "Hawaiian Civil War soldier finally recognized". Hawaii News Now.
- Foenander, Terry; Milligan, Edward; et al. (March 2015). "Asians and Pacific Islanders in the Civil War" (PDF). National Park Service. Archived from the original (PDF) on February 22, 2016.
- Foenander, Terry; Milligan, Edward; et al. (March 2015). "Hawaiians in the Civil War" (PDF). National Park Service. Archived from the original (PDF) on November 23, 2015.
- Hawaiʻi Pacific University (July 15, 2015). "HPU partners with National Park Service, Hawaii Civil War Round Table for July 17 talk". HPU News. Archived from the original on July 20, 2015.
- Punaboy (June 20, 2015). "Hawaiʻi Sons of the Civil War". Aloha Valley. Archived from the original on July 17, 2015.
- Smith, Jeffrey Allen (August 13, 2013). "The Civil War and Hawaii". The New York Times: Opinionator. New York.
