= USS Norfolk Packet =

Gunboat of the United States Navy

History

United States
- Name: USS Norfolk Packet
- Laid down: date unknown
- Launched: date unknown
- Acquired: 10 September 1861
- Commissioned: 7 February 1862
- Decommissioned: 12 July 1865
- Stricken: 1865 (est.)
- Home port: Port Royal, South Carolina
- Fate: Sold, 10 August 1865

General characteristics
- Tonnage: 349
- Length: 108 ft (33 m)
- Beam: 28 ft 2 in (8.59 m)
- Propulsion: schooner sail
- Speed: not known
- Complement: 40
- Armament: one 13" mortar; two 32-pounder guns; two 12-pounder guns

USS Norfolk Packet was a large schooner purchased by the Union Navy during the American Civil War. She was assigned to gunboat duty in the inland waterways of the Confederate States of America.

== Purchase ==
Schooner Norfolk Packet was purchased by the Navy from George Goodspeed of New York City 10 September 1861; altered for naval service by J. Engles; and commissioned 7 February 1862 at the New York Navy Yard, Lt. Watson Smith in command.

== Mississippi River mortar fleet ==
The schooner was assigned to the Mortar Flotilla assembled under Comdr. David Dixon Porter for Flag Officer David Farragut's attack on New Orleans, Louisiana. The flotilla arrived in the Mississippi River 18 March; and, after eight days of arduous work in getting the larger vessels of the fleet over the bars, was ready for action.

The flotilla moved into position on 16 April and the mortars opened fire on Forts Jackson and St. Philip which protected New Orleans from attack by sea. From 16 until 24 April the mortar schooners bombarded the Confederate works. On the night of the 24th, Farragut's deep-draft ships raked the forts and the next day New Orleans surrendered.

== Vicksburg ==
Norfolk Packet bombarded Vicksburg, Mississippi 27 June through 8 July 1862 supporting Farragut during his run past the batteries to meet Flag Officer Davis's Western Flotilla. Following this operation the schooner sailed to Baltimore, Maryland, for repairs.

== South Atlantic blockade ==
Norfolk Packet was next assigned to the South Atlantic Blockading Squadron, and arrived Port Royal, South Carolina, 7 November 1862. For the rest of the war, she blockaded the Confederate coast operating in the coastal waters of South Carolina, Georgia, and Florida.

She participated in the bombardment of Fort McAllister, Georgia. 3 March 1863; captured schooner Ocean Bird off St. Augustine Inlet, Florida. 23 October; assisted Beauregard in capturing British schooner Linda attempting to slip into Mosquito Inlet, Florida. 11 March 1864. She took sloop Sarah Mary 26 June.

== Decommissioning and disposal ==
After fighting stopped, Norfolk Packet departed Port Royal, South Carolina, on 23 June 1865. She was decommissioned at the Philadelphia Navy Yard on 12 July, and was sold at public auction on 10 August.
