= Henry Falcott =

French-born soldier in the U.S. Army

- Born: 1835; Champagne, France
- Died: December 2, 1910 (aged 74–75); San Antonio, Texas, United States
- Burial place: San Antonio National Cemetery
- Military career
- Allegiance: United States of America
- Branch: United States Army
- Service years: c. 1868–1869
- Rank: First Sergeant
- Unit: 8th U.S. Cavalry
- Conflicts: Indian Wars; Apache Wars
- Awards: Medal of Honor

Henry Falcott (1835 – December 2, 1910) was a French-born soldier in the U.S. Army who served with the 8th U.S. Cavalry during the Apache Wars. He was one of thirty-four men received the Medal of Honor for gallantry in several battles against the Apache Indians in the Arizona Territory from August to October 1868.

== Biography ==
Henry Falcott was born in Champagne, France in 1835. He emigrated to the United States and enlisted in the U.S. Army in San Francisco, California. He joined Company L of the 8th U.S. Cavalry and eventually reached the rank of first sergeant. He was part of a small cavalry force numbering 50 to 60 soldiers, primarily from Company B and Company L, who were charged with protecting settlers from Apache raiding parties in the Arizona Territory during the summer and fall of 1868. Falcott and his comrades faced the Apache in fierce fighting, often being ambushed or sniped at from hidden ravines, in a campaign lasting 90 days. The following summer, Falcott and 33 other members of his regiment received the Medal of Honor for "bravery in scouts and actions against Indians" on July 24, 1869. It was one of the largest MOH presentations at the time. Falcott died in San Antonio, Texas on December 2, 1910, at the age of 75. He was interred at the San Antonio National Cemetery.

== Medal of Honor citation ==
Rank and organization: Sergeant, Company L, 8th U.S. Cavalry. Place and date: Arizona, August to October 1868. Entered service at: ------. Birth: France. Date of issue: July 24, 1869.

Citation:

Bravery in scouts and actions against Indians.

== See also ==
- List of Medal of Honor recipients for the Indian Wars
