= John L. Bullis =

John Lapham Bullis (April 17, 1841 – May 26, 1911) was a much-decorated American soldier and later an entrepreneur. Camp Bullis in San Antonio, Texas, built in 1917, was named in his honor.

He was born at Macedon, New York, the eldest of the seven children of Dr. Abram R. and Lydia P. (Lapham) Bullis. Although brought up as a Quaker, he did not attend services regularly.

Bullis served in the Civil War, Indian Wars, and Spanish–American War.

In the 1870s and 1880s Bullis used his knowledge of West Texas to make very shrewd investments in land. In 1886 Bullis was a partner in the Shafter Silver Mine in Presidio County, Texas, with famed Colonel William R. Shafter and rancher John A. Spencer. These investments made him a very wealthy man.

== Civil War ==
On August 8, 1862, Bullis enlisted as a private in the 126th New York Volunteer Infantry. He was quickly promoted to corporal.

Bullis was wounded and captured at the Battle of Harpers Ferry (September 12–15, 1862). During the Battle of Gettysburg (July 1–3, 1863), he was wounded and captured again. He then was imprisoned for 10 months at the brutal Libby Prison in Virginia until he was exchanged for a Confederate soldier in the spring of 1864.

In August 1864 he was commissioned as a captain in the 118th USCT Infantry. The United States Colored Troops were a unit composed of runaway and freed black slaves who had volunteered to fight against the Confederacy. Their officers and most senior non-commissioned officers were white; they had to volunteer for the assignment and received a promotion. Distinguished enlisted men or experienced non-commissioned officers were offered subaltern ranks (ensign, lieutenant, or captain), and officers were granted promotions to field rank (major, lieutenant colonel, or colonel).

In February 1866, he was mustered out of the Army after failing to acquire a regular commission in the drastically-reduced postwar Army.

== Indian Wars ==
In September 1867, he was offered a commission as a Second Lieutenant in the 41st (Colored) Infantry, an all-black regiment. In 1869, there was a downsizing of the Corps of Infantry from 45 regiments to 25 and he was reassigned as a Lieutenant in the 24th (Colored) Infantry, a famed Buffalo Soldier regiment in Texas.

In 1873, Bullis was promoted to First Lieutenant, and re-assigned to command the Seminole-Negro Indian Scouts at Fort Clark, Texas.

From 1873–1876 and 1878–1879 he served under General Ranald S. Mackenzie, where he received citations for bravery.

From 1882 to 1888 he served at Fort Supply in the Indian Territory.

In 1886, he served under General Nelson A. Miles on his campaign to capture Geronimo.

From 1888 to 1893 Bullis served as an Indian Agent to the Apaches on the San Carlos Reservation. From 1893 to 1897 he was stationed in Santa Fe, New Mexico Territory, where he served as an Indian Agent to the Puebloes and Jicarilla Apaches.

Bullis was promoted to major in 1897 and served as a paymaster at Fort Sam Houston.

In 1898–1899 Bullis served in the Spanish–American War in Cuba with the 24th Colored Infantry of Buffalo Soldiers.

In 1904, shortly before his retirement, he was promoted to brigadier general by President Theodore Roosevelt.

=== Battles ===
==== Eagle's Nest Crossing (April 1875) ====
On April 5, Lieutenant Bullis and three Seminole-Negro Indian scouts (Sergeant John Ward, Trumpeter Issac Payne, and Private Pompey Factor) went out on patrol to intercept a band of raiders who had attacked a stage coach. On April 18, Bullis and his men came upon a band of 25-30 Lipan Apache driving a herd of 75 stolen horses towards Mexico. The horses were presumed stolen because some had bridles and were shod and the others weren't. Although outnumbered, they decided to track and apprehend the horse thieves. On the afternoon of April 26, they caught up with the band at Eagle's Nest Crossing just before the Pecos River. They surprised the band and recovered the horses. The band soon recovered and set out after the scouts. There was a pitched battle in which Sergeant Ward had his carbine's buttstock shattered by bullets. Low on ammunition and outnumbered, the scouts had to retreat and leave the horses behind. Bullis, on foot after his horse reared him off, was saved by Sergeant Ward, who picked him up on horseback at a trot. Bullis recommended Sergeant Ward, Trumpeter Payne, and Private Factor for the Medal of Honor, which they received on May 28, 1875.

== Life after the Army ==
Bullis retired from the Army in 1905 with the rank of Brigadier General.

Bullis was at Fort Sam Houston watching a boxing match in the fort's gymnasium on the evening of May 25, 1911, when he became ill. He died in the Post Hospital at Fort Sam Houston from an apoplexic stroke on May 26, 1911.

John Lapham Bullis was buried in a plot at the San Antonio National Cemetery along with 281 Buffalo Soldiers. He was later followed by his second wife Josephine (Withers) Bullis in 1934 and his eldest daughter Lydia L. Bullis in 1973.

== Family ==
In 1872, Bullis married Alice Rodríguez (?-1887) of San Antonio, Texas. She died in 1887 and they had no children.

In 1891 he married Josephine Withers (September 8, 1865 - December 3, 1934) of San Antonio, Texas. They had three daughters.

- Lydia P. Bullis (born September 7 (elder twin), 1892 Fort Bayard, New Mexico Territory - died September 20, 1973, San Antonio, TX)
- Anita Withers Bullis (born September 8 (younger twin), 1892 Fort Bayard, New Mexico Territory - died October 2, 1944, San Antonio, TX) Anita was buried in San Fernando Cemetery #1 (Cemeterio de San Fernando), San Antonio, Texas.
- Octavia M. Bullis (born April 5, 1894, Santa Fe, New Mexico Territory - died June 30, 1975, San Antonio, TX) Octavia was buried in her husband William's plot in San Antonio National Cemetery.

- Octavia married William (Sumner Teall) Halcomb (b. March 12, 1893 - d. September 30, 1974), an officer in the US Army, on (date?). They had a son.

- William Sumner Halcomb (born October 28, 1927), William S. Halcomb retired from the Army with the rank of Lieutenant-Colonel.

== Awards ==
In 1881, Bullis received a pair of engraved presentation swords (one gold and one silver) from the grateful citizens of Kinney County, in West Texas for his services. They can be seen on display at the Witte Museum in San Antonio, Texas.

On April 7, 1882, Bullis received the thanks of the Texas Legislature in a special Joint Resolution "in behalf of the people of the frontier of this State, in repelling the depredations of Indians and other enemies of the frontier of Texas."

In 1890, Bullis received overdue brevet citations for gallant service for the fights at Remolino (Coahuila, Mexico) (1873), Eagle's Nest Crossing (Pecos River, Texas) (1875), Saragosa (Coahuila, Mexico) (1876), and Burro Mountains (Coahuila, Mexico) (1881).

Camp Bullis in San Antonio, Texas, built in 1917, was named in his honor.
