= Solon D. Neal =

- Born: 1846; Hanover, New Hampshire, United States
- Died: November 1, 1920 (aged 74); Fort Sam Houston, San Antonio, Texas
- Burial place: San Antonio National Cemetery
- Military career
- Allegiance: United States of America
- Branch: United States Army
- Service years: 1866–1897
- Rank: Sergeant
- Units: 6th U.S. Cavalry; 8th U.S. Cavalry; 10th U.S. Infantry; 11th U.S. Infantry; 16th U.S. Infantry; 19th U.S. Infantry
- Conflicts: Indian Wars; Texas–Indian Wars
- Awards: Medal of Honor

Solon D. Neal (1846 – November 1, 1920) was an American soldier in the U.S. Army who served with the 6th U.S. Cavalry during the Texas-Indian Wars. He was one of thirteen men who received the Medal of Honor for gallantry against the Kiowa and Chief Kicking Bird at the Battle of the Little Wichita River on July 12, 1870.

== Biography ==
Solon D. Neal was born to Eli and May Neal in Hanover, New Hampshire in 1846. One of four children, he had two brothers, Joseph and Frank, and a sister Mary. Neal was educated in local public schools and, upon outbreak of the American Civil War in 1861, the 15-year-old Neal attempted to enlist in the Union Army but his father refused to give his permission. Solon remained in school and later became a carpenter's apprentice however, on March 1, 1866, he left home and made his way to Boston, Massachusetts where enlisted in the U.S. Army. He was sent to Carlisle Barracks in Pennsylvania for basic cavalry training and assigned to Company L of the 6th U.S. Cavalry. Neal spent his first three years in East Texas at Bonham, McKinney, Jefferson, and Greenville during Reconstruction assisting civil authorities in law enforcement, patrolling against vigilante groups, and monitoring elections. He was also involved in pursuing outlaws in the region, most notably, Bob Lee and his gang. On February 20, 1867, less than a year after his enlistment, Neal was promoted to the rank of sergeant.

When his term of enlistment expired on March 1, 1869, Neal immediately reenlisted and was transferred to Fort Richardson where he served as post librarian. In early-1870, he was called for frontier duty against raiding bands of Kiowa and Comanches. He was among the cavalrymen under Captain Curwen B. McClellan who fought against the Kiowa and Chief Kicking Bird near the Little Wichita River on July 12, 1870, and one of thirteen soldiers who received the Medal of Honor for "gallantry in action" a month later. On the final day of the battle, Neal volunteered with Corporal James Watson and Sergeants John May and John Kirk to clear snipers high up on the cliffs who were preventing the cavalry's retreat. Two of the snipers were killed and all four men were able to hold the hill until the command was safely past. The fighting ended half an hour later as the Kiowa withdrew and rode off.

Afterwards, Neal was transferred to Fort Harker in Kansas in early 1871 and where he was discharged on May 29 of that year. He returned to military service a year later and joined Company K of the 11th U.S. Infantry at Fort Richardson, Texas. Neal spent the next several years escorting railroad-surveying crews, mail coaches and supply trains until April 15, 1877. He then reenlisted with the 10th U.S. Infantry at Fort Clark, Texas on January 8, 1878, but obtained a transfer to the 8th U.S. Cavalry shortly after and spent five years fighting against Mexican bandits and trans-border Indian raiders. After his reenlistment on February 20, 1883, Neal served with 19th U.S. Infantry from 1883 to 1888, and with the 16th U.S. Infantry until 1893. He was appointed to the Indianapolis Arsenal as an ordnance sergeant and remained there until his retirement in 1897. Returning to Texas, he lived in San Antonio until his death in the Station Hospital at Fort Sam Houston on November 1, 1920, and interred at the San Antonio National Cemetery. In accordance to his final wishes, his entire life savings ($5,000) was left to the American Red Cross. His residence at 106 Wyoming Street later became the site of the HemisFair '68 Tower.

== Medal of Honor citation ==
Rank and organization: Private, Company L, 6th U.S. Cavalry. Place and date: At Wichita River, Tex., 12 July 1870. Entered service at: ------. Birth: Hanover, N.H. Date of issue: 25 August 1870.

Citation:

Gallantry in action.

== See also ==
- List of Medal of Honor recipients for the Indian Wars
