= 5th Massachusetts Cavalry Regiment =

5th Regiment Massachusetts Colored Volunteer Cavalry
- Active: January 9, 1864-October 31, 1865
- Disbanded: October 31, 1865
- Country: United States
- Allegiance: Union
- Branch: Cavalry
- Size: Regiment
- Engagements: American Civil War: Baylor's Farm; Siege of Petersburg

The 5th Regiment Massachusetts Colored Volunteer Cavalry (or 5th Regiment, Massachusetts Cavalry (Colored)) was a cavalry regiment from Massachusetts, that served in the Union Army during the American Civil War. It was the third regiment to recruit black soldiers in Massachusetts, after the famous 54th and 55th regiments.

== Service ==
The regiment was organized from January 9-May 5, 1864, at Camp Meigs, Readville, near Boston. Battalion moved to Washington, D. C., May 5-8, 1864. Regiment moved to Fort Monroe, Va., thence to City Point, Va., May 13-16. Attached to Rand's Provisional Brigade, 18th Army Corps, Dept. of Virginia and North Carolina, May, 1864. From May 12, 1864, it served dismounted and equipped as infantry until the end of war.

Assigned to Brig. Gen. Hinks' Colored Division, 18th Army Corps, to June, 1864. 1st Brigade, 3rd Division, 18th Army Corps, to July, 1864. Point Lookout, Md., District of St. Mary's, 22nd Army Corps, to March, 1865. Unattached, 25th Army Corps, Dept. of Virginia, to June, 1865. Dept. of Texas to October, 1865. Mustered out October 31, 1865, in Boston.

== Detailed service ==
After the success in recruiting black volunteers for the 54th and 55th Massachusetts Infantry Regiments, Massachusetts Governor John Albion Andrew called for the creation of a third black regiment in January of 1864. The regiment organized at Camp Meigs, near Boston, and left for Washington D.C. in early May, where they recruited more black soldiers. The 5th was then commanded moved to City Point, Virginia, the headquarters for General Ulysses S. Grant and the Union Army during the Siege of Petersburg.

The regiment was assigned to the XVIII Corps under Maj. Gen. William F. "Baldy" Smith, and made up a considerable portion of Brig. Gen. Edward Winslow Hincks' "Colored Brigade". Under Maj. Gen. Smith, the 5th engaged in combat for the first and only time at Baylor's Farm during the Second Battle of Petersburg from June 14-15, 1864. The regiment was held back in reserve during the battles at Jerusalem Plank Road, Staunton River Bridge, and Sappony Church.

On June 28, 1864, the 5th was sent to Point Lookout, Maryland, to guard a prisoner of war camp housing 20,000 Confederate soldiers. In March of 1865, the regiment was commanded to return to the Richmond-Petersburg Campaign, where they were allegedly one of the first regiments to enter the city of Richmond after its capture. On June 16, 1865, the 5th was sent to Clarksville, Texas, to intervene in growing French hostilities in Mexico. They did not engage in combat and were sent back to Boston, Massachusetts in October. The regiment mustered out on October 31, 1865.

== Casualties ==
The regiment lost 123 enlisted men; 7 enlisted men were killed or mortally wounded, and 116 enlisted men died of disease.

== Commanders ==
- Colonel Henry S. Russell (March 7-June 14, 1864; wounded at Baylor's Farm)
- Major Henry Pickering Bowditch (June 14-September 30, 1864)
- Colonel Henry S. Russell (September 30, 1864 – February 14, 1865; resigned)
- Colonel Charles Francis Adams, Jr. (February 14-August 1, 1865)
- Colonel Samuel Chamberlain (August 1-October 31, 1865; regiment mustered out)

== Notable soldiers and officers ==
- Private Prince Romerson (c. 1840–1872), a Native Hawaiian soldier from the Kingdom of Hawaii who also fought as a Buffalo Soldier.
- Joshua Dunbar, the father of renowned American poet Paul Laurence Dunbar, served as a volunteer soldier in both the 5th Regiment Massachusetts Colored Volunteer Cavalry and the 55th Massachusetts Volunteer Regiment.
- Corporal William R. Meadows (c. 1842-May 6, 1868), moved to Claiborne Parish, Louisiana after the war. He served as a representative to the state constitutional convention of 1868 after Louisiana was readmitted to the Union. He was murdered by unknown parties outside his home on the evening May 6, 1868. [New Orleans Republican, May 22, 1868, p. 1]
- 2nd Lt. Daniel Henry Chamberlain, who'd become Attorney General and eventually Governor of South Carolina.
- George Lawrence Mabson, who becomes the first black lawyer in North Carolina

== See also ==
- List of Massachusetts Civil War Units
- Massachusetts in the Civil War
