= Hawaii and the American Civil War =

After the outbreak of the American Civil War, the Kingdom of Hawaii under King Kamehameha IV declared its neutrality on August 26, 1861. However, many Native Hawaiians and Hawaii-born Americans (mainly descendants of the American missionaries), abroad and in the islands, enlisted in the military regiments of various states in the Union and the Confederacy.

== Governmental policy ==
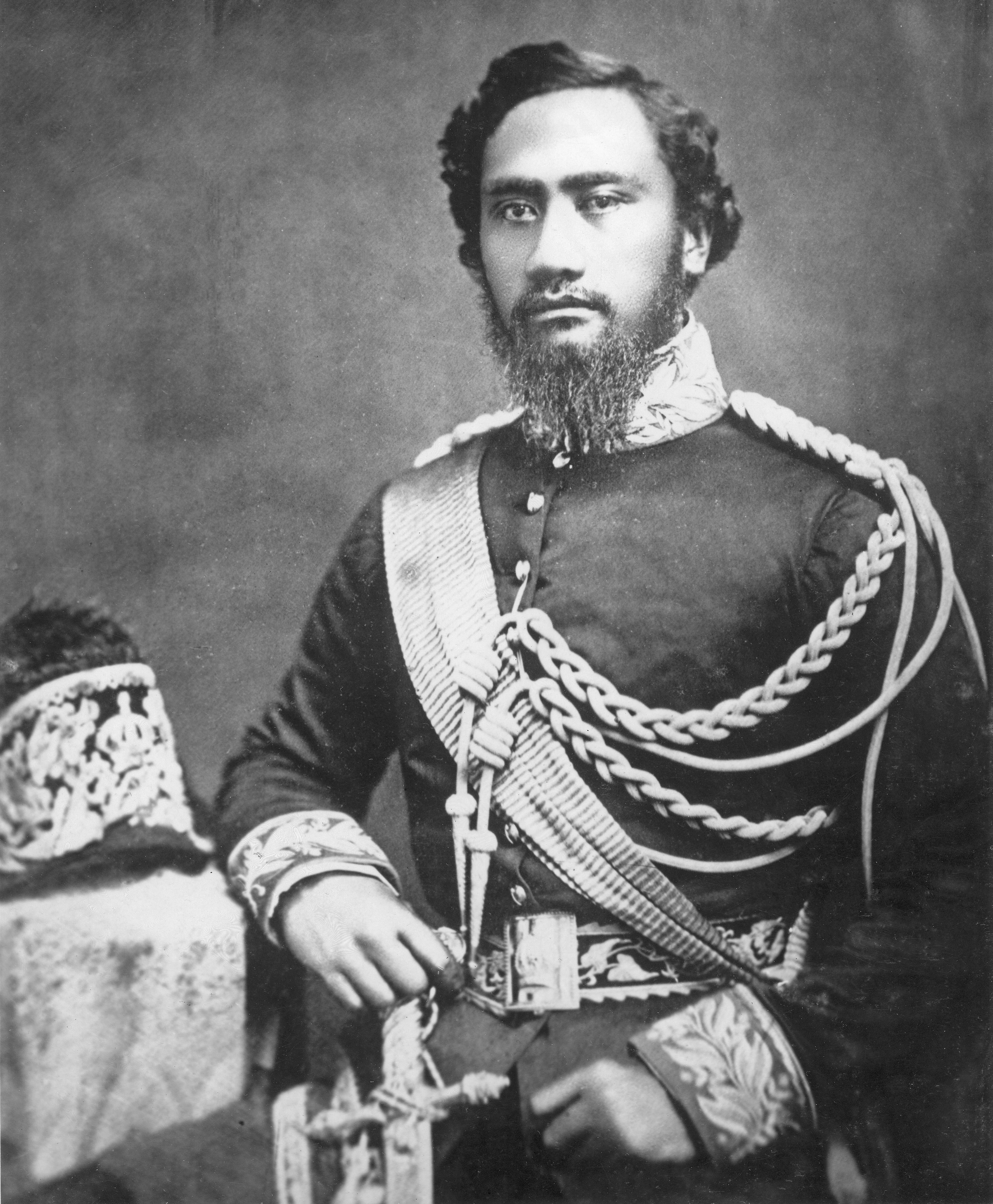
Kamehameha IV declared Hawaii's neutrality in 1861.

After the outbreak of the American Civil War, Hawaii was concerned with the possibility of attacks by Confederate privateers in the Pacific. There were debates in the Hawaiian government in regards to the best course of action. Minister of Foreign Affairs Robert Crichton Wyllie advocated for a declaration of neutrality, following the one made by the previous King Kamehameha III during the Crimean War in 1854, while King Kamehameha IV and Minister of Finance David L. Gregg feared the diplomatic repercussions of recognizing the belligerent status of the Confederate States of America and were initially reluctant to risk displeasing the United States with any form of recognition of the Confederacy. After the United Kingdom and France declared their neutrality in the conflict, the King, and Gregg relented.

On August 26, 1861, King Kamehameha IV signed the formal proclamation of neutrality:

Be it known to all whom it may concern, that we, Kamehameha IV, King of the Hawaiian Islands, having been officially notified that hostilities are now unhappily pending between the government of the United States and certain States thereof styling themselves "The Confederate States of America," hereby proclaim our neutrality between said contending parties. That our neutrality is to be respected to the full extent of our jurisdiction, and that all captures and seizures made within the same are unlawful, and in violation of our rights as a sovereign. And be it further known that we hereby strictly prohibit all our subjects, and all who reside or may be within our jurisdiction, from engaging, either directly or indirectly, in privateering against the shipping or commerce of either of the contending parties, or of rendering any aid to such enterprises whatever; and all persons so offending will he liable to the penalties imposed by the laws of nations, as well as by the laws of said States, and they will in no wise obtain any protection from us as against any penal consequences which they may incur. Be it further known that no adjudication of prizes will be entertained within our jurisdiction, nor will the sale of goods or other property belonging to prizes be allowed. Be it further known that the rights of asylum are not extended to the privateers or their prizes of either of the contending parties, excepting only in cases of distress or of compulsory delay by stress of weather or dangers, of the sea, or in such cases as may be regulated by treaty stipulation. Given at our marine residence of Kailua this 26th day of August, A. D. 1861, and the seventh of our reign.

A few months before the neutrality proclamation, an American expatriate and businessman, Captain Thomas Spencer, personally funded and drilled a company of infantry composed mostly of Native Hawaiians from Hilo on the island of Hawaii. They were sworn in at a Fourth of July luau hosted by Spencer at his residence in Hilo. These volunteers, dubbed the "Spencer's Invincibles," offered their services to President Abraham Lincoln and the Union. However, to avert diplomatic controversy and in defense of the Hawaii's neutrality, King Kamehameha IV and Foreign Minister Wyllie officially denied permission for the men to go as a unit. When Captain Spencer heard the news, he reportedly burst into tears.

== Hawaiian combatants ==
Despite the Hawaiian government's reluctance to be involved in the conflict, many Native Hawaiians and Hawaii-born Americans (mainly descendants of the American missionaries) both abroad and in the islands volunteered and enlisted in the military regiments of various states in the Union and the Confederacy. Individual Native Hawaiians had been serving in the United States Navy and Army since the War of 1812, and even more served during the American Civil War. Many Hawaiians sympathized with the Union because of Hawaii's ties to New England through its missionaries and the whaling industries, and the ideological opposition of many to the institution of slavery, which the Constitution of 1852 had specifically officially outlawed in the Kingdom. The sons of American missionaries in Hawaii, many studying in American universities, also enlisted; twenty-one were students at Punahou School. Notable volunteers from Hawaii include: Henry Hoʻolulu Pitman, Samuel C. Armstrong, Nathaniel Bright Emerson, James Wood Bush, Prince Romerson, and J. R. Kealoha.

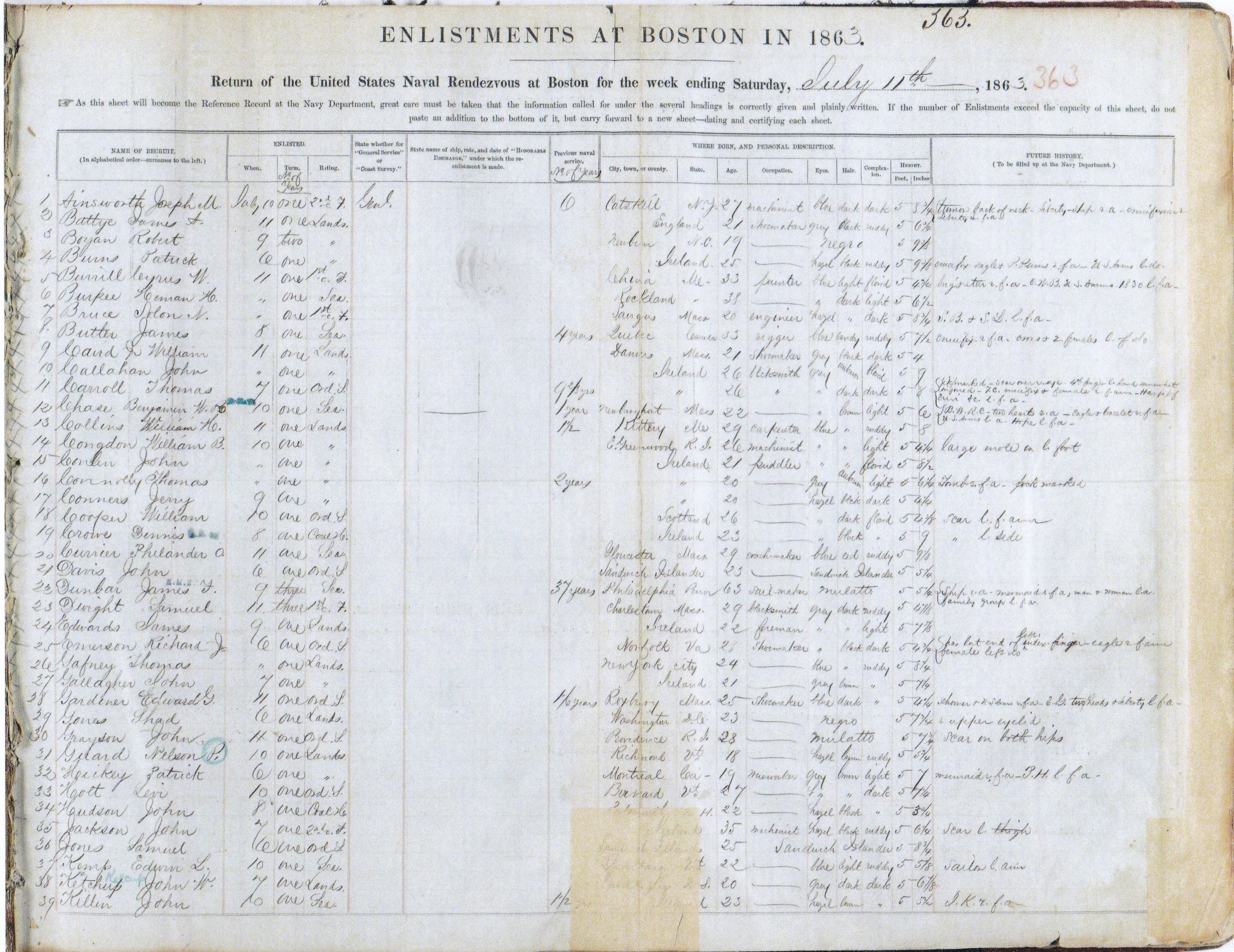
Naval Enlistments at Boston July 1863 no. 21 John Davis Ord Seaman and no.36 Samuel Davis Ord Seaman, both from Sandwich Islands (Hawaii)

Two mariners on the Boston Massachusetts Naval Rendezvous July 1863 (see thumbnail) list of naval recruits were from Hawaii, listed as the "Sandwich Islands". These Hawaiian sailors are enumerated as John Davis (no. 21) Ordinary Seaman, age 23 and Samuel Jones Ordinary Seaman, age 25 (no. 36), both men are described as born in the Sandwich Islands and as a "Sandwich Islander".

According to the 2014 survey, researchers have identified 119 documented Native Hawaiian and Hawaii-born combatants from historical records. The exact number still remains unclear because many Hawaiians enlisted and served under Anglicized names and little is known about them due to the lack of detailed records.

== Legacy ==
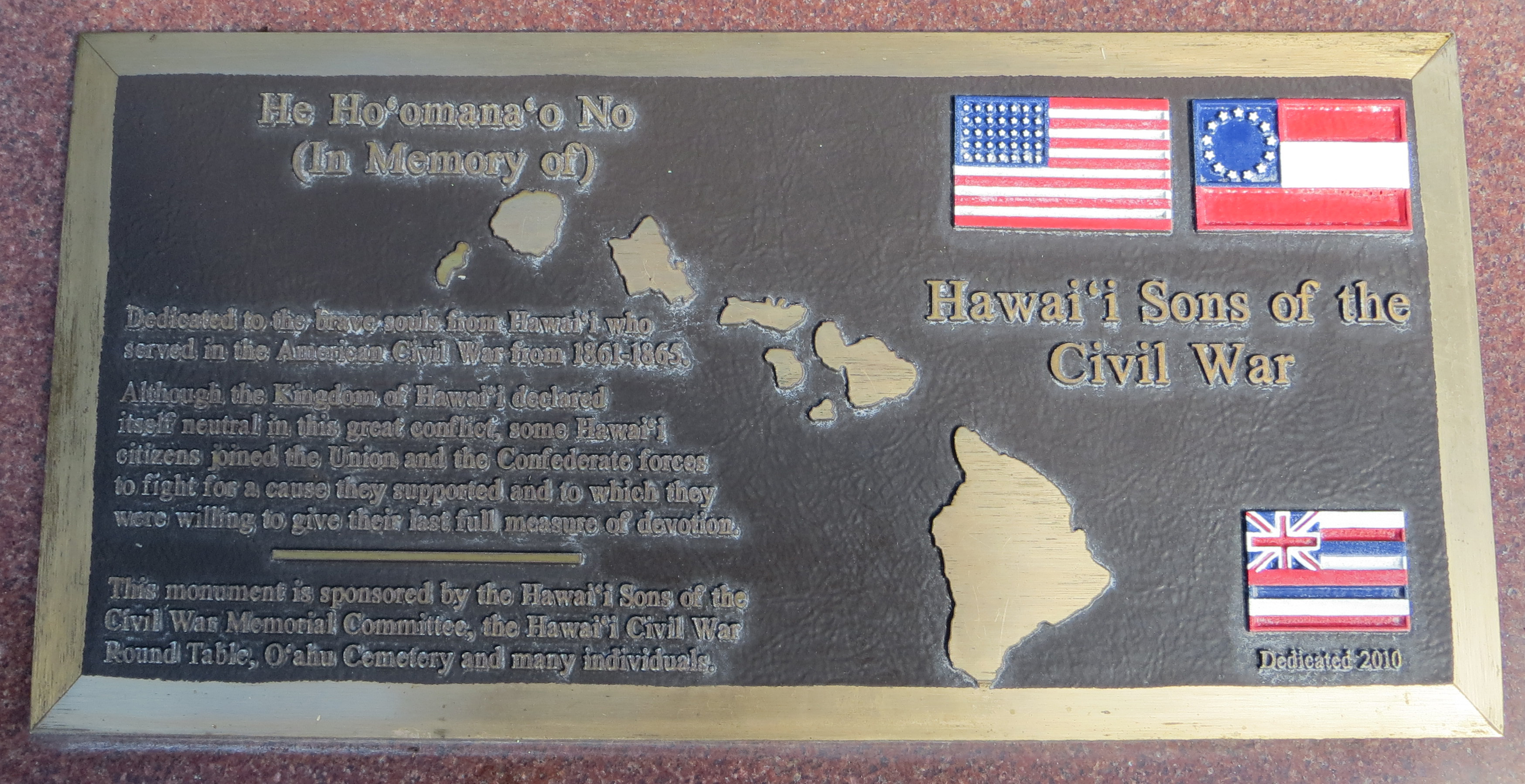
Memorial plaque for Hawaii Sons of the Civil War in the National Memorial Cemetery of the Pacific, Honolulu

Many veterans of the Civil War are buried in Honolulu's Oʻahu Cemetery, although most of the marked graves belong to veterans from other states who later settled in Hawaii. On August 26, 2010, on the anniversary of the signing of the Hawaiian Neutrality Proclamation, a bronze plaque was erected along the memorial pathway at the National Memorial Cemetery of the Pacific in Honolulu recognizing the "Hawaii Sons of the Civil War", the more than one hundred documented Hawaiians who served during the American Civil War for both the Union and the Confederacy.

In 2013, Todd Ocvirk, Nanette Napoleon, Justin Vance, Anita Manning and others began the process of creating a historical documentary about the individual experiences and stories of Hawaii-born soldiers and sailors of the American Civil War from both the Union and the Confederacy. In 2015, the sesquicentennial of the end of the war, the National Park Service released a publication titled Asians and Pacific Islanders and the Civil War about the service of the large number of combatants of Asian and Pacific Islander descent who fought during the war. The history of Hawaii's involvement and the biographies of Pitman, Bush, Kealoha, and others were co-written by historians Anita Manning, Justin Vance and others.

== See also ==
- Kingdom of Hawaii–United States relations

== Bibliography ==
- Bernard, Mountague (2009). The Neutrality of Great Britain during the American Civil War. Bedford, MA: Applewood Books. ISBN 978-1-4290-1642-1. OCLC 316824474.
- Daws, Gavan (1968). Shoal of Time: A History of the Hawaiian Islands. Honolulu: University of Hawaii Press. ISBN 978-0-8248-0324-7. OCLC 45815755.
- Dye, Bob (1997). Merchant Prince of the Sandalwood Mountains: Afong and the Chinese in Hawaiʻi. Honolulu: University of Hawaii Press. ISBN 978-0-8248-1772-5. OCLC 247424976.
- Forbes, David W., ed. (2001). Hawaiian National Bibliography, Vol 3: 1851–1880. Honolulu: University of Hawaii Press. ISBN 978-0-8248-2503-4. OCLC 314293370.
- Grzyb, Frank L. (2016). The Last Civil War Veterans: The Lives of the Final Survivors, State by State. Jefferson, NC: McFarland & Company, Inc., Publishers. ISBN 978-1-4766-2488-4. OCLC 934885367.
- Kam, Ralph Thomas (2009). "Commemorating the Grand Army of the Republic in Hawaiʻi: 1882–1930". Hawaiian Journal of History. 43. Honolulu: Hawaiian Historical Society: 125–151. hdl:10524/12242.
- Kuykendall, Ralph Simpson (1978) [1953]. The Hawaiian Kingdom 1854–1874, Twenty Critical Years. Vol. 2. Honolulu: University of Hawaii Press. ISBN 978-0-87022-432-4. OCLC 47010821.
- Manning, Anita; Vance, Justin W. (2014). "Hawaiʻi at Home During the American Civil War". Hawaiian Journal of History. 47. Honolulu: Hawaiian Historical Society: 145–170. hdl:10524/47259.
- Schmitt, Robert C. (1998). "Hawaiʻi's War Veterans and Battle Deaths". Hawaiian Journal of History. 32. Honolulu: Hawaiian Historical Society: 171–174. hdl:10524/521.
- Schuessler, Mark (January 2012). "A Surprising Civil War Dedication". American Digger. 8 (1). Acworth, GA: Greybird Publishing: 66.
- Shively, Carol A., ed. (2015). "Pacific Islanders and the Civil War". Asians and Pacific Islanders and the Civil War (PDF). Washington, D. C.: National Park Service. pp. 130–163. ISBN 978-1-59091-167-9. OCLC 904731668.
