= Old San Antonio City Cemeteries Historic District =

Historic district in Texas, United States

- U.S. National Register of Historic Places
- U.S. Historic district
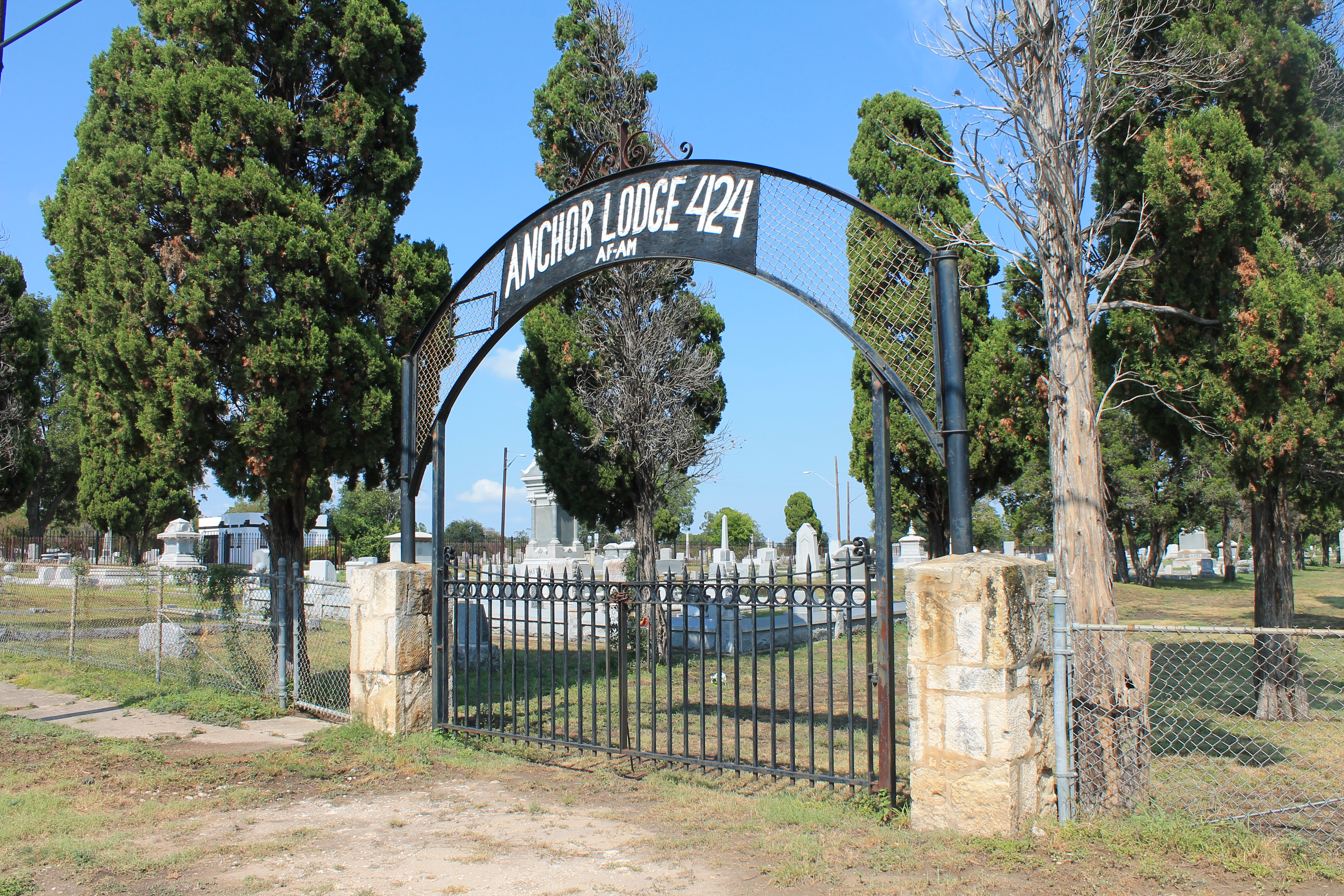
- Anchor Masonic Lodge Cemetery

- Location within Texas Location within the United States
- Location: Roughly bounded by Nevada, New Braunfels, Paso Hondo, Palmetto, Potomac, St. James, Pine, E. Commerce, Dakota, Monumenta, San Antonio, Texas
- Coordinates: 29.419°N 98.464°W
- Area: 103 acres (42 ha)
- NRHP reference No.: 00000772
- Added to NRHP: October 11, 2000

The Old San Antonio City Cemeteries Historic District, also known as the Eastside Cemetery Historic District, is a 103-acre complex collection of the oldest cemeteries in San Antonio, all established between 1853 and 1904. The individual cemeteries in the district were once part of land acreage that the City of San Antonio parceled off and sold to local churches and other organizations to be used as their private cemeteries. It was listed on the National Register of Historic Places in 2000.

The cemeteries are notable for their layout and size, their diversity of design (from simple to formal), their funerary monuments (from works of accomplished sculptors to folk design), and for the array of community leaders interred there. While burials in 24 of the cemeteries are predominantly Anglo, seven cemeteries are solely or largely African American. There are scattered Hispanic burials, though the majority of Hispanics in the 19th century were interred in San Fernando Cemetery, established in ca. 1855 on San Antonio's west side.

The exact number of individual cemeteries in the complex is either 31 or 32, depending on the sourcing. Officially, the count is usually 31. However, the sourced table below contains 32 listings. San Antonio Parks and Recreation Department puts the number at 31. Both the University of the Incarnate Word and the San Antonio Conservation Society list 32.

By far, the largest burial ground in the complex is the San Antonio National Cemetery, approximately one square block in size. It was created in 1867, when the City of San Antonio parceled off a plot of land from its municipal cemetery and donated it to the Federal Government. Within the grounds are the graves of veterans of the American Civil War, both those who served in the Confederate States Army, as well as Union soldiers who served in the conflict and had originally been buried elsewhere. It is believed that older graves predating the American Civil War were also moved to the cemetery, as private monuments. Over 300 of the graves are unknown soldiers. Among the dead are African American Buffalo Soldiers, and other military veterans of all races. Thirteen Congressional Medal of Honor recipients, four of whom are buried as "unknown soldiers", rest in the cemetery.

== List of cemeteries in the district ==
Old San Antonio City Cemeteries Historic District
Property	Image	Address	Notes	Ref(s)
Agudas Achim Cemetery		1400 E. Crockett		
Alamo Masonic Lodge Cemetery		1703 Commerce St. E		
Anchor Masonic Lodge Cemetery		1701 Commerce St. E		
Beacon Light Masonic Lodge No. 50 Cemetery		200 Chestnut		
City Cemetery No. 1				
City Cemetery No. 2				
City Cemetery No. 3				
City Cemetery No. 4				
City Cemetery No. 5				
City Cemetery No. 6				
Confederate Cemetery (San Antonio)				
Dignowity Cemetery		Poyomac St		
Dullnig Family Plot				
Emmanuel German Lutheran Cemetery		325 New Braunfels Ave S		
Grand United Order of Odd Fellows Cemetery				
Hermann Sons Cemetery – Harmonia Lodge No. 1				
Hermann Sons Cemetery				
Independent Order of Odd Fellows Cemetery				
Knights of Pythias Cemetery		2102 Commerce St E		
St. Michael's Polish Catholic Cemetery				
Nat Lewis Plot & Mausoleum				
Old German Lutheran Cemetery				
San Antonio Lodge No. 1 Cemetery				
San Antonio National Cemetery		517 Paso Hondo Street		
St Elmo Lodge No. 25 Knights of Pythias Cemetery				
St. John's Lutheran Cemetery				
St. Joseph's Society Catholic Cemetery				
St. Joseph's Catholic Cemetery				
St. Mary's Catholic Cemetery				
St. Peter Claver Catholic Cemetery				
Temple Beth-El Cemetery		1350 E Crockett St		
United Brothers of Friendship Cemetery			Otis E. Fitzgerald, president of the local NAACP buried there.	

== Additional sourcing ==
Texas, San Antonio (2021). "City of San Antonio Designated Historic Landmarks" (PDF). City of San Antonio.
