= Lewis Warrington (Medal of Honor) =

American officer in the U.S. Army

- Born: 1848; Washington, D.C., United States
- Died: January 5, 1879; San Antonio, Texas
- Burial place: San Antonio National Cemetery
- Military career
- Allegiance: United States
- Branch: United States Army
- Service years: 1867–1879
- Rank: First Lieutenant
- Unit: 4th U.S. Cavalry
- Conflicts: Indian Wars; Texas–Indian Wars
- Awards: Medal of Honor

First Lieutenant Lewis Warrington III (unknown – January 5, 1879) was an American officer in the U.S. Army who served with the 4th U.S. Cavalry during the Texas–Indian Wars. He won distinction while commanding a small cavalry detachment against a hostile band of Comanche Indians in the Muchague Valley on December 8, 1874, and was one of three men received the Medal of Honor in the engagement. He is the only officer during the Indian Wars to receive the award immediately after the battle rather than in subsequent years.

== Biography ==
Lewis Warrington III, the grandson of War of 1812 naval hero Commodore Lewis Warrington, was born in Washington, D.C. and later entered the United States Army there. He was assigned to the 4th U.S. Cavalry Regiment as a second lieutenant on June 18, 1867, and then made a first lieutenant on July 31, 1869. Warrington spent most of his career on the Texas frontier and served under Colonel Ranald S. Mackenzie during the Texas-Indian Wars of the 1870s. On December 8, 1874, he and ten cavalrymen pursued a group of hostile Comanche Indians through the Muchague Valley. Both groups were riding at a full gallop and several riders of Warrington's unit were left behind. Warrington personally captured one Indian, turning him over to a trooper whose horse could not continue, and resumed the pursuit with Privates Frederick Bergendahl and John O'Sullivan. After five miles, their horses exhausted, the Comanches dismounted and decided to shoot it out with the troopers. Climbing out of the valley onto the plain, they opened fire on Warrington and his men as they climbed up after them. Warrington eventually became separated from the others and found himself at the mercy of five Comanche warriors. He was forced to fight them off single-handed and, after exhausting his ammunition, used his rifle as a club in hand-to-hand combat. Bergendahl and O'Sullivan found themselves in a similar situation and killed all but one of their attackers. O'Sullivan pursued the lone survivor but was unable to catch him. All three men received the Medal of Honor four months later, Warrington being the only officer of the Indian Wars to receive the award following the battle rather than years afterwards like other officers. Warrington died on January 5, 1879, and was buried in San Antonio National Cemetery.

== Medal of Honor citation ==
Rank and organization: First Lieutenant, 4th U.S. Cavalry. Place and date: At Muchague Valley, Tex., 8 December 1874. Entered service at Washington, D.C. Birth: Washington, D.C. Date of issue: 12 April 1875.

Citation:

Gallantry in a combat with 5 Indians.

== See also ==
- List of Medal of Honor recipients for the Indian Wars
