= USS Beauregard =

Gunboat of the United States Navy

History

Confederate States
- Name: Beauregard
- Owner: A group headed by A. F. W. Abrams
- Launched: 1850
- Commissioned: Oct 14, 1861
- Fate: Captured by Union Navy forces, Nov 12, 1861
- Notes: ex-Priscilla C. Ferguson

General characteristics (Confederate Privateer)
- Type: Schooner
- Tonnage: 101
- Propulsion: Sail
- Speed: 7 knots
- Complement: 40
- Armament: 1 × 24-pdr rifle

United States
- Name: USS Beauregard
- Namesake: P. G. T. Beauregard
- Acquired: Feb 24, 1862
- Commissioned: Mar 28, 1862

General characteristics (US Navy)
- Armament: 1 × 30-pdr rifle; 2 × 12-pdr howitzers

The USS Beauregard began the war as a Confederate privateer. The Union Navy acquired the schooner from the prize court and outfitted the vessel for blockade duty.

== Privateer ==
As one method to counter Union naval power, the Confederacy issued letters of marque to facilitate the use of privateers against northern shipping. A group headed by A. F. W. Abrams of Charleston, S.C. acquired the schooner Priscilla C. Ferguson to arm her as a privateer. They renamed her vessel Beauregard and fitted out with a single 24–pounder rifled gun and accommodations for a 40-man crew. The privateer Beauregard was commissioned in Charleston, S.C. on October 14, 1861. The ship's preparations did not go unreported. By October 24, 1861, a northern ship master had notified Secretary of the Navy Welles that both Beauregard and Dixie were at Charleston preparing for service as privateers.

Captain Gilbert Hay, with two lieutenants, one purser, and 23 crewmen, succeeded in running the blockade unobserved on November 5, 1861. During the Beauregard's time as an active privateer, no captures were reported. On November 12, 1861 Lt. William C. Rogers commanding the USS William G. Anderson spotted Beauregard in the Bahama Channel. Even though Beauregard sailed with fewer men than originally planned, the "many men on her decks" attracted Lt. Rogers’ attention to the schooner when only 4 miles off." After a 2-hour chase, Anderson was able to capture the vessel. When Captain Hay finally surrendered, he presented his letter of marque from Jefferson Davis to his captors. After taking control of Beauregard and putting a prize crew on board, Lt. Rogers proceeded to take the prisoners and the prize to Key West for adjudication. Anderson and its prize arrived in Florida on November 19, 1861. The prize court condemned the schooner with gross proceeds of $2,146.67 and $1,854.92 for distribution after costs and expenses.

== U. S. Navy ==
The U.S. Navy purchased the Beauregard from the prize court for $1,810 on February 24, 1862 and began fitting the schooner for service with the blockading squadrons. To replace the 24 pound rifled gun that the privateer's crew had spiked, the navy armed the Beauregard with a single 30 pound rifle and two 12 pound howitzers. The ship was allocated to the East Gulf Blockading Squadron, then commanded by Flag Officer William McKean. Flag Officer McKean assigned Acting Master David Stearns to command the Beauregard and the ship was commissioned on March 28, 1862.

During the Beauregard's service with the Eastern Gulf squadron, she patrolled the coasts of Florida and was credited with capturing 11 blockade runners. Like other ships assigned to blockade duty, the Beauregard was also called upon to participate in attacks against coastal locations. On April 2, 1863, she supported an attack against Tampa, Florida, and on July 28, 1863, she was in action at New Smyrna, Florida.

=== Prizes and adjudication ===
Date	Ship Type	Prize Name	Gross Proceeds	Costs and Expenses	Amount for Distribution	Where Adjudicated	Sent to 4th Auditor for Distribution	Vessels Entitled to Share
Jun 20, 1862		Lucy						
Aug 26, 1863		Phoebe						
Oct 6, 1863		Last Trial						
Nov 5, 1863	Schooner	Volante	$1,355.11	$144.20	$1,210.91	Key West	Nov 17, 1864	Beauregard
Jan 15, 1864	Schooner	Minnie	$3,362.16	$296.76	$3,065.40	Key West	Apr 26, 1865}	Beauregard
Jan 28, 1864	Sloop	Racer	$6,350.38	$741.13	$5609.25	Key West	Mar 22, 1865	Beauregard
Mar 11, 1864	Sloop	Hannah	$339.50	$123.00	$216.59	Key West	Mar 22, 1865	Beauregard
Mar 11, 1864	Schooner	Linda	$1,237.65	$171.50	$1,066.15	Key West	Mar 22, 1865	Beauregard, Norfolk Packet
Apr 7, 1864	Schooner	Spunky	$5,396.81	$484.02	$4,912.79	St. Augustine	Mar 28, 1865	Beauregard
Apr 18, 1864	Schooner	Oramoneta	$856.20	$249.96	$606.24	St. Augustine	Nov 4, 1864	Beauregard
May 12, 1864	Sloop	Resolute	$563.25	$122.53	$440.79	Key West	Mar 22, 1865	Beauregard

== Post-war record ==
The schooner was sold at Key West, Florida, June 28, 1865.
