= San Antonio Confederate Cemetery =

Cemetery in San Antonio, Texas, United States

- Interactive map of San Antonio Confederate Cemetery

Details
- Location: San Antonio, Texas
- Country: United States
- Coordinates: 29°25′13″N 98°27′49″W
- Type: Private
- No. of graves: ~900

The San Antonio Confederate Cemetery is a private cemetery in the city of San Antonio, Texas, which is now surrounded by the Old San Antonio City Cemeteries Historic District. There are more than 900 graves of Confederate veterans in the 2 acre (0.8 ha) cemetery, including those of colonels John S. Ford and George W. Baylor. The Confederate Cemetery Association - San Antonio, Texas are the caretakers of this cemetery, allowing access to all visitors and the decedents of those intured within its grounds, under Texas State cemetery laws. The CCA has maintained the grounds, roads, and gravesites of the cemetery since the City of San Antonio decided not to renew its contract for maintenance in 2019.

== See also ==
- San Antonio National Cemetery
