= Dallol =

Dallol may refer to:

Ethiopia:

- Dallol (ghost town)
- Dallol (hydrothermal system)
- Dallol (woreda)
- Dallol (volcano)
