= Danakil Depression =

Geological feature in East Africa

Coordinates: 14.2417°N 40.3°E

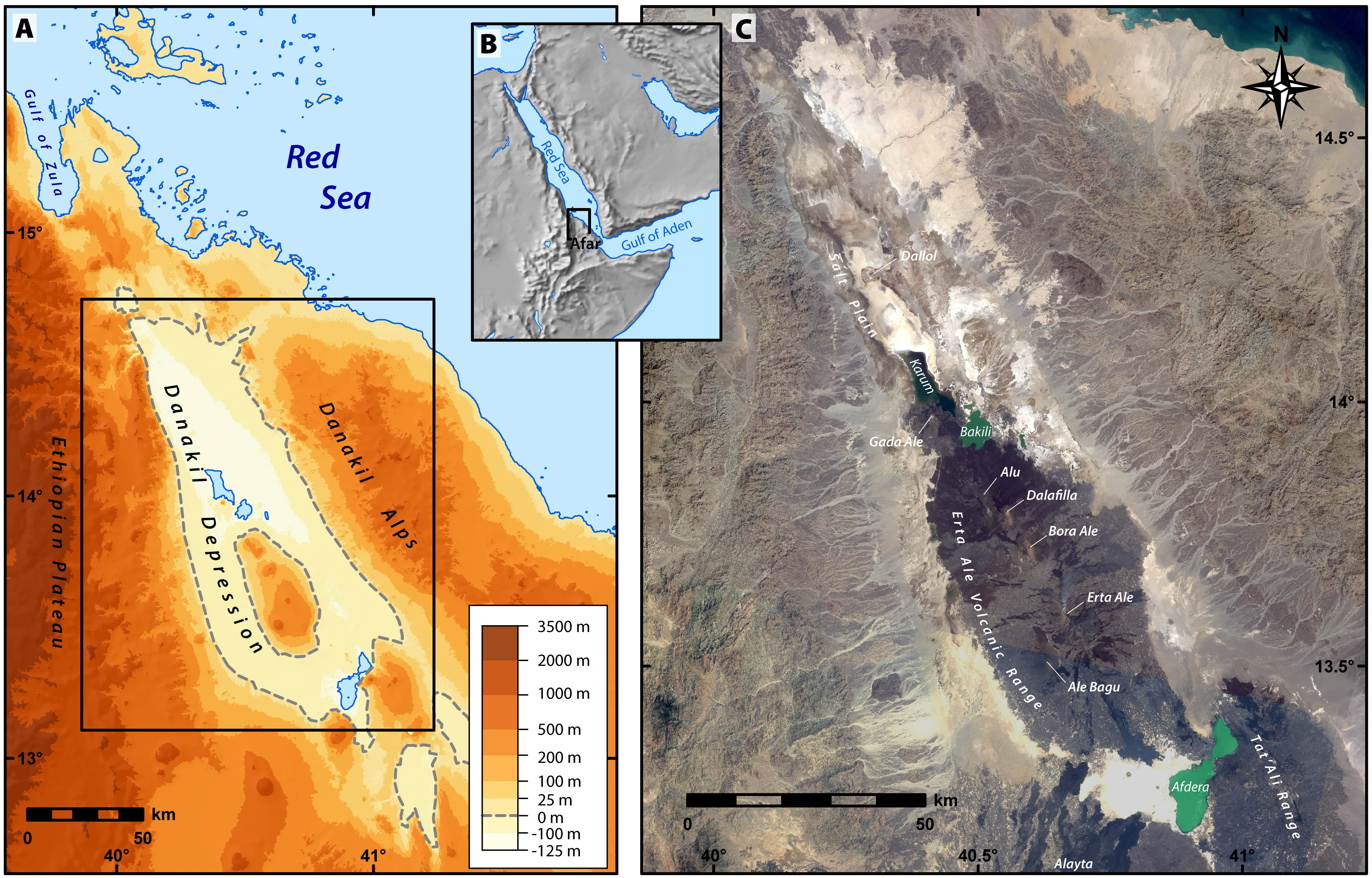
Map of the Danakil Depression. Panel A shows the topography and the parts of the Depression situated below sea-level. Panel C show a satellite image showing the dark colours of the volcanic rocks in the south and the light colours of the salt plain and marine sediments in the north.

The Danakil Depression is a large valley of approximately 200 by 50 km (124 by 31 mi), across the north of the Afar Region of Ethiopia and Eritrea. It is about 125 m (410 ft) below sea level and is bordered to the west by the Ethiopian Plateau and to the east by the Danakil Alps, beyond which is the Red Sea. It is the third lowest-lying location on the continent of Africa.

The Danakil Depression is a geological depression formed by rifting. It constitutes the northern part of the Afar Triangle or Afar Depression.

== Geology ==
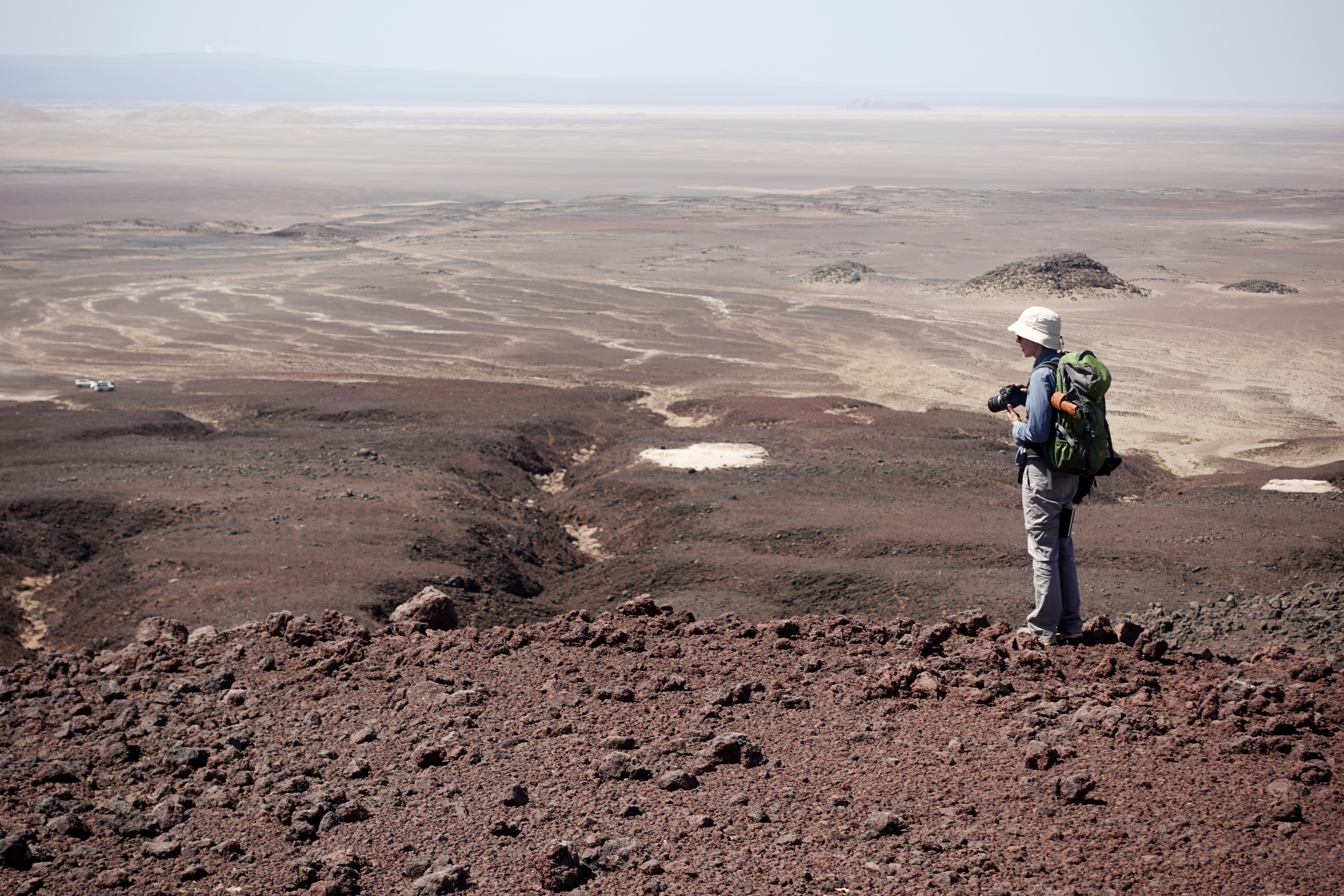
Landscape of the Danakil Depression. The bright white coloured rocks are Pleistocene marine sediments. The Erta Ale range is visible in the background.

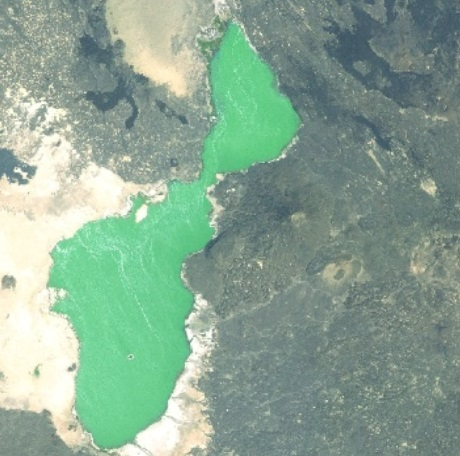
Lake Afrera, Danakil Depression, Ethiopia

The Danakil Depression is a large valley caused by the extension between the Nubian plate and the Danakil (or Arrata) microplate (on which lie the Danakil Alps). The velocity between these two plates is approximately 18 mm/yr in the south of the Depression and 8 mm/yr in the north of it. The Danakil Depression is thus a rift, more precisely the northern tip of the Afar rift.

The formation of the rift started approximately 11 million years ago (Ma) with the counterclockwise rotation of the Danakil microplate. Since then, tectonic extension caused the thinning of the crust and the subsidence of the basin where both sediments and volcanic rocks accumulated. In contrast to the neighbouring central Afar region which is closer to the Afar hotspot, the Danakil Depression only experienced moderate volcanic activity during its first rifting phase. However, this volcanic activity increased significantly since at least 0.6 Ma, forming the Erta Ale volcanic range. This volcanic activity was probably triggered by the thinning of the crust and the adiabatic decompression of the underlying mantle, producing large quantities of magma.

The southern part of the depression is dominated by the Erta Ale range featuring multiple shield and stratovolcanoes such as the Gada Ale, Alu, Dalafilla, Bora Ale, Erta Ale and Ale Bagu. These volcanoes mainly produced basaltic rocks. The petrology and geochemistry of these rocks indicate an absence of continental crust under the volcanic range, suggesting that the Nubian and Danakil plates are probably detached there. This indicates that the rift is at an advanced stage of evolution, close to continental breakup and oceanisation. However, the Erta Ale range does not represent a normal oceanic crust yet, but rather a transitional crust. In this part of the depression, most of the extension is accommodated by dike intrusions, and not by faulting.

The northern part of the Depression is dominated by sedimentary rocks. The extension is accommodated by tectonic faulting. Volcanic activity is less significant than in the southern part of the depression, but two volcanoes can be found: Maraho and Dallol. The intrusion of dikes has also been measured. Close to the western margin of the depression, ephemeral rivers bring coarse sediments, forming alluvial fans dominated by conglomerates. During the Mid- and Late Pleistocene, the basin was flooded at least four times by the Red Sea during periods of high sea-level. The last flooding happened approximately 130,000 years ago. These floods are testified by fossil coral reefs and by thick (>500m) evaporite deposits (mainly halite, i.e. salt) found in the central part of the basin. The lower part of the evaporites, featuring halite and potash minerals, deposited directly by evaporating seawater coming from the Red Sea during the last flooding. The upper part of the evaporites deposited in continental waters forming salt lakes and salt pans. These continental waters became saline after dissolving older marine evaporites at the margins of the basin or at depth. This process is still ongoing, in particular around Lake Karum.

=== Dallol ===
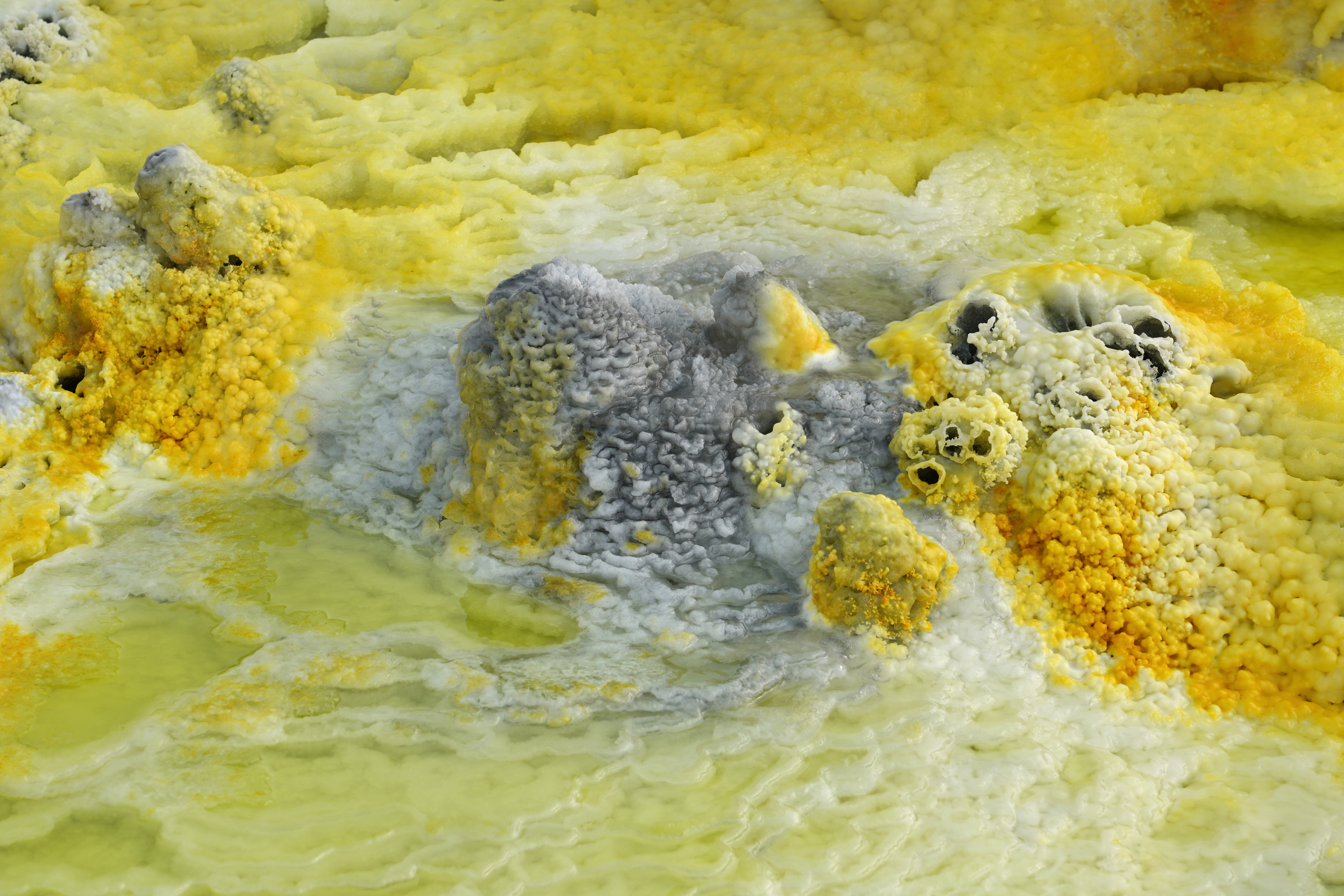
Landscape at Dallol, Afar Triangle, East Africa

Dallol is a unique volcano situated in the central part of the salt plain. Magmatic fluids interact at depth with the evaporites, dissolving them and causing their ascent to the surface, and forming a salt volcano. The fluids escaping at the surface are extremely acidic, salty and hot. The oxidation of dissolved salts, the complexation of iron and chlorine sulfates, and evaporation create complex coloured structures. These extreme conditions are also studied by biologists looking for extremophiles, organisms living in conditions usually fatal to life. They found microorganisms in most of Dallol's ponds, but not in the immediate proximity of the hot chimneys where the fluids reach the surface.

=== Hot springs ===
Around Dallol, several other hydrothermal springs are present, such as Gaet'Ale Pond (also called Yellow Lake).

Gaet'ale Pond is a small hypersaline lake located over a tectonic hot spring in the depression. With a salinity of 43%, the pond is the saltiest water body on Earth. The pond was created in January 2005 following an earthquake, according to residents of Ahmed'ela village, which reactivated the hot spring.

=== IUGS geological heritage site ===
In recognition of it demonstrating "the ongoing birth of an ocean witnessed through tectonics and volcanism in an extreme evaporite arid environment", the International Union of Geological Sciences (IUGS) included The Danakil Rift depression and its volcanism in its assemblage of 100 geological heritage sites around the world in a listing published in October 2022. The organisation defines a geological heritage site as "a key place with geological elements and/or processes of international scientific relevance, used as a reference, and/or with a substantial contribution to the development of geological sciences through history."

== Features ==
The Danakil Depression is the hottest place on Earth in terms of year-round average temperatures. It is also one of the lowest places on the planet at 100 metres (330 ft) below sea level, and without rain for most of the year.

It features several endorheic and saline lakes, such as Lake Afdera, Lake Karum, and Lake Bakili that sit on volcano-tectonic depressions.

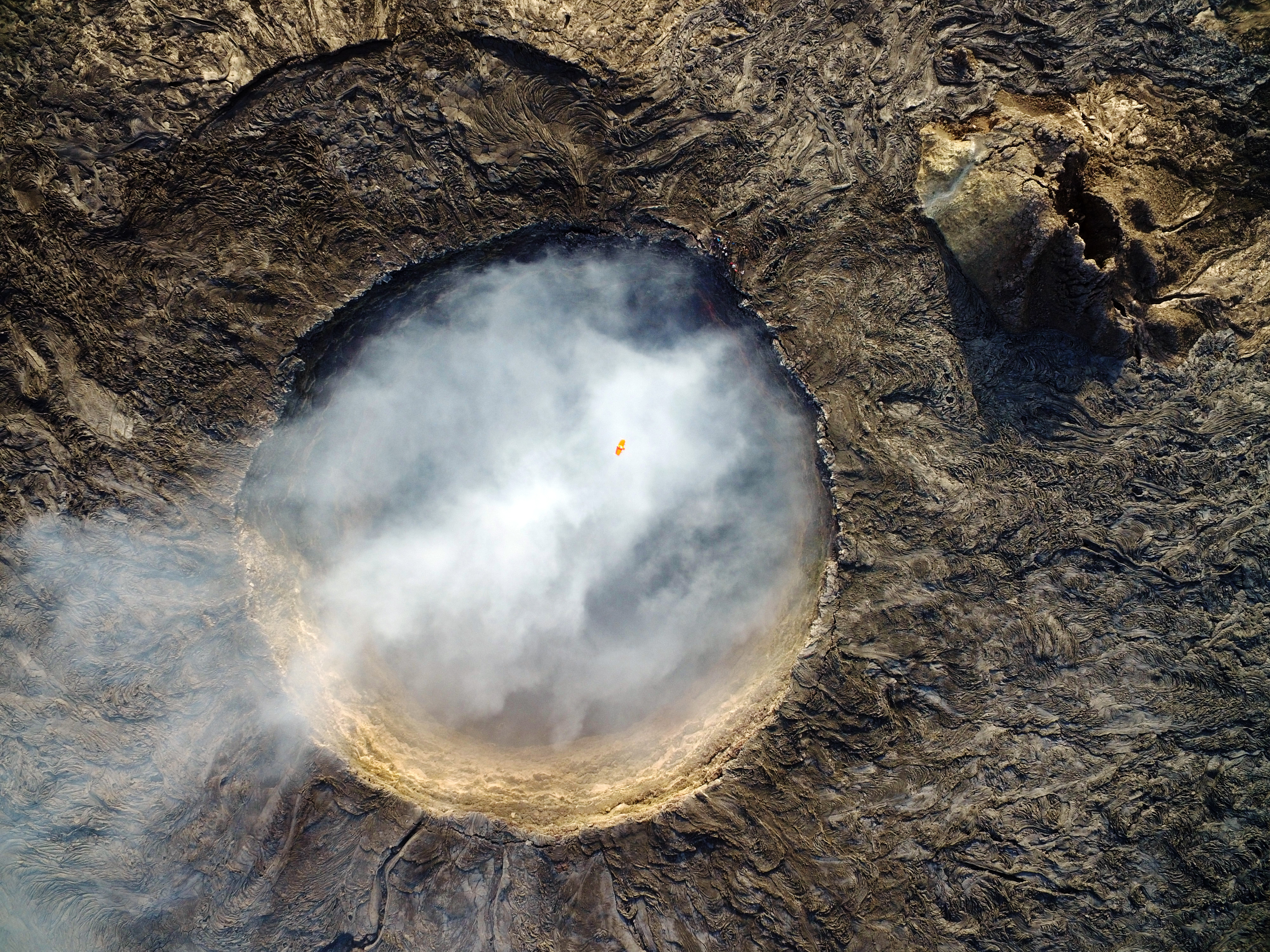
The crater of Erta Ale

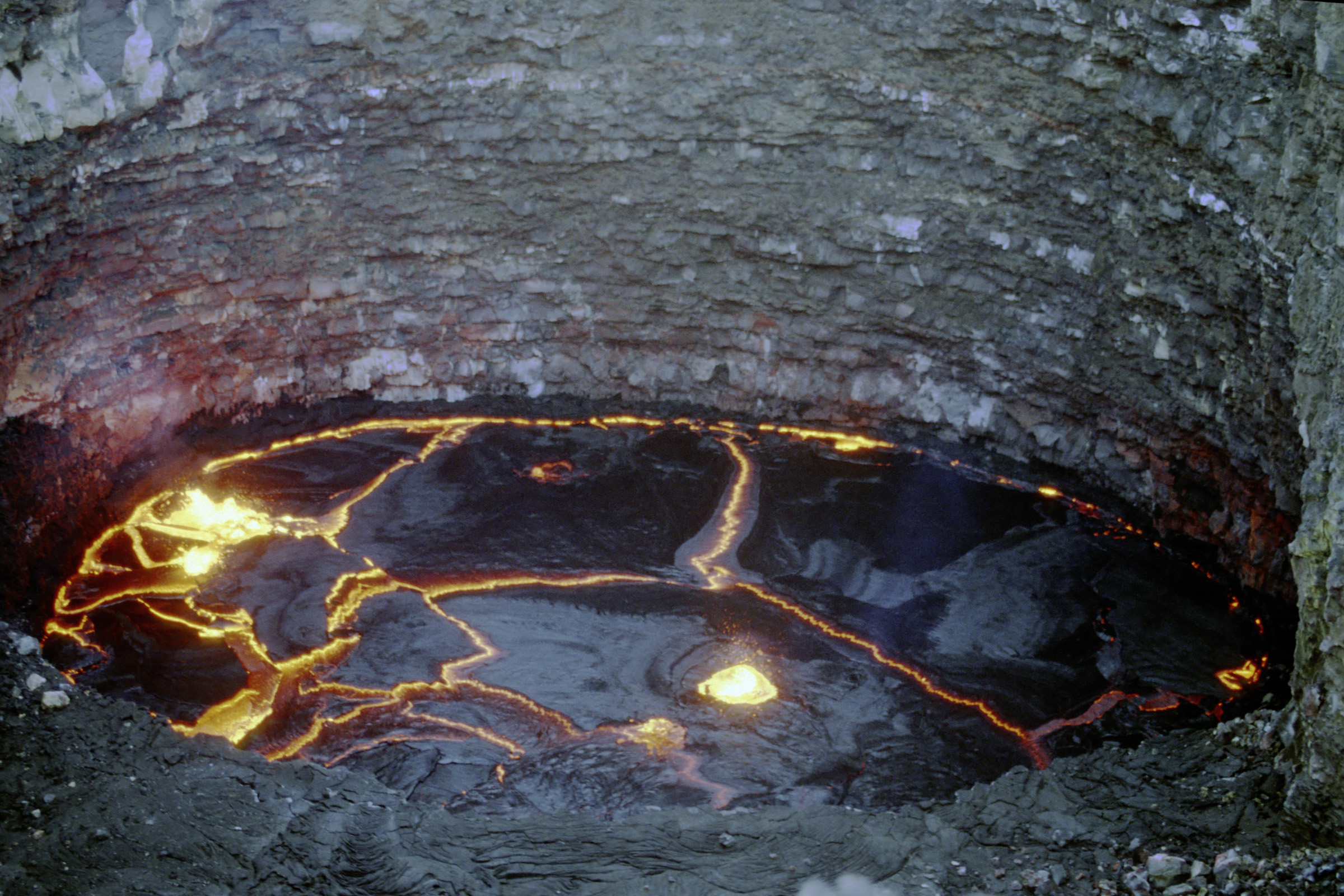
A lava lake in the caldera of Erta Ale

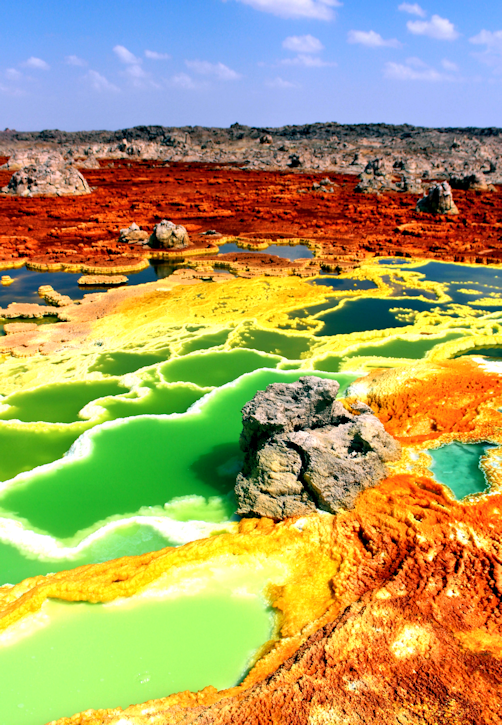
The Dallol salt volcano

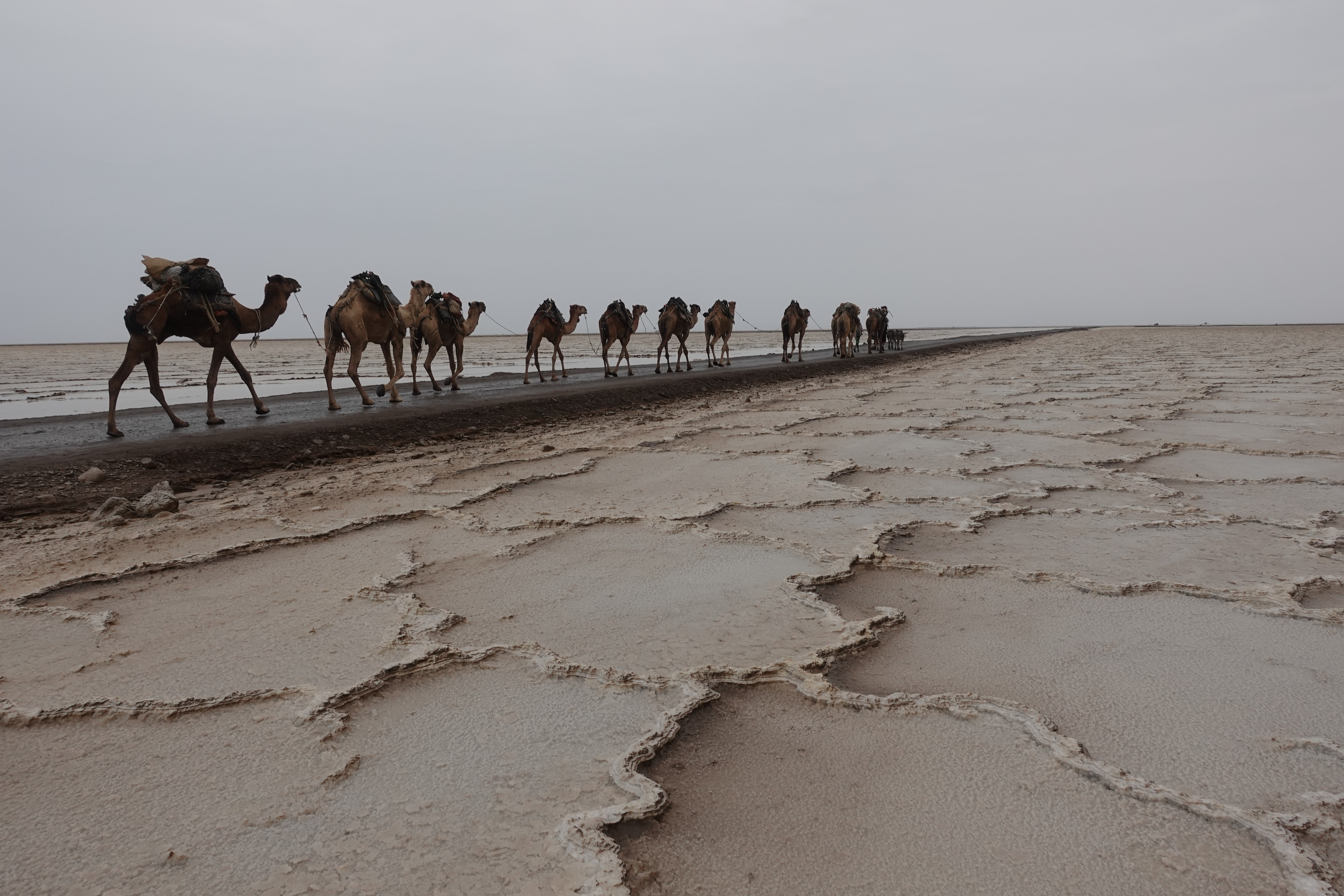
The salt pan

== See also ==
- Danakil Desert
