= Hayli Gubbi =

Volcano in Ethiopia

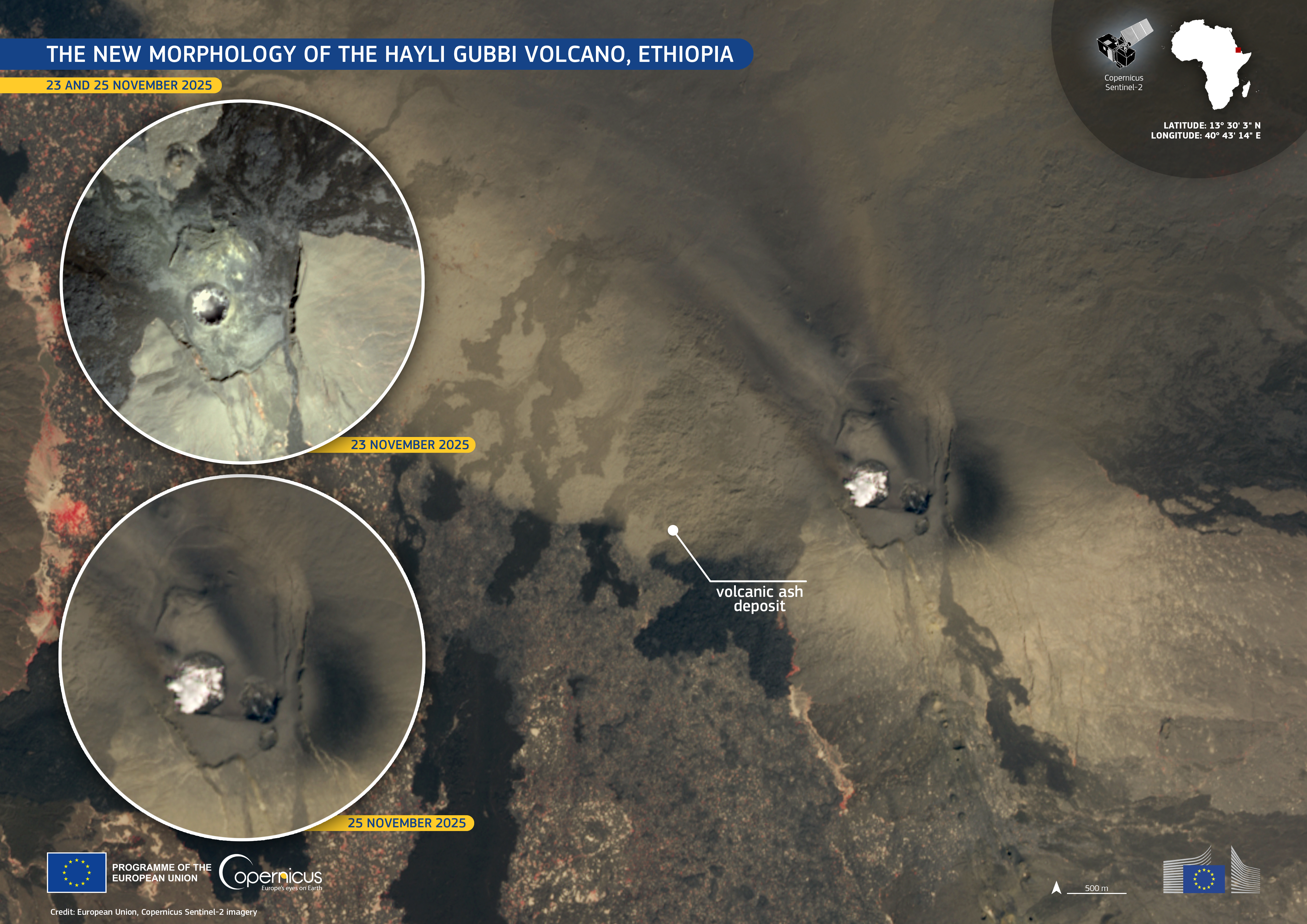
- Satellite view of the Hayli Gubbi volcano, after its November 2025 eruption

Highest point
- Elevation: 493 m (1,617 ft)
- Coordinates: 13°30′36″N 40°42′59″E

Geography
- Location: Afar Region, Ethiopia
- Parent range: Erta Ale Range

Geology
- Mountain type: Shield volcano
- Last eruption: 23 November 2025

Hayli Gubbi (/haɪli ˈɡuːbi/ hy-lee goo-bee Amharic: ሃይሊ-ጉቢ, romanized: Haylē-Gubi) is a shield volcano located in the Afar Region of Ethiopia. It is the southernmost volcano of the Erta Ale Range. Until November 2025, there was no direct record of any eruptions of this volcano, although records of eruptions in the area are limited by the remoteness of the region. However, studies in 1969 and 1970 identified lava flows on Hayli Gubbi's southern flank that overflowed rock formations which had formed around 8200 years Before Present (BP), showing the volcano must have erupted some time more recently than 8250 years ago prior to 2025.

== 2025 eruption ==
On 23 November 2025, the Toulouse Volcanic Ash Advisory Centre (VAAC) released an advisory bulletin stating that an explosive volcanic eruption was underway, and an ash plume had been detected in satellite imagery. The initial eruption is reported to have occurred at 08:30 UTC, with an ash plume reaching 45,000 feet (14,000 m) (flight level 450). The ash plume later drifted northeastward across the Arabian Peninsula, including Yemen and Oman and eventually into North India and parts of China, causing flight disruptions. The eruption is likely a sub-plinian eruption, with a buoyant eruption plume visible in photographs of the event. By 20:00 UTC, the explosive phase of the eruption was considered to have stopped. Volcanic activity subsided on 25 November. A field expedition already in the area reported observations of the volcano and ejecta on 25 November suggesting that the eruption was produced by a steam explosion.

Following the eruption, there were concerns about impacts on air quality in some locations, and on the impacts on air travel from the drifting ash plume. However, there were no reports of significant impacts away from the location of the eruption itself.

In a research paper published shortly after the eruption, authors from the Universities of Addis Ababa, Pisa and Southampton and colleagues reported that they had detected an underground intrusion of magma beneath the nearby volcano, Erta Ale, during July and August 2025. The dike intrusion began on 10–16 July, and accompanied a major eruption of Erta Ale on 15 July 2025, which involved explosions, crater collapse and lava flows. Satellite imagery and modelling showed that the dike propagated southwards in July and August 2025, underneath Hayli Gubbi. The eruption was likely caused by the mixing of the basaltic magma from a dyke from Erta Ale with a preexisting trachytic magma chamber over the span of four months before breaking through.

== See also ==
- List of volcanoes in Ethiopia
- 2005 Dabbahu eruption
- 2011 Nabro eruption
- East African Rift
- 2025 in the environment
