= Danakil Desert =

Desert in northeast Ethiopia

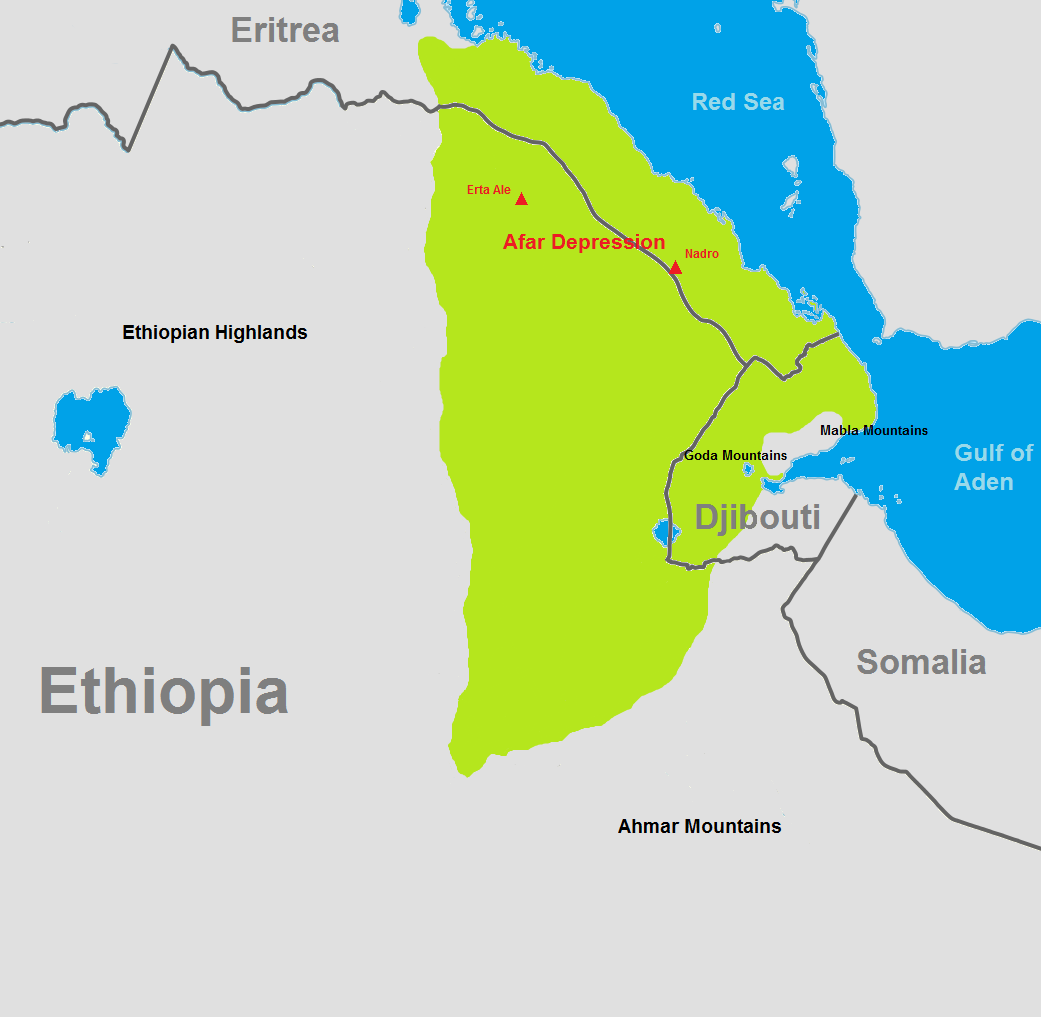
- Area: 136,956 km^{2} (52,879 mi^{2})

Geography
- Country: Ethiopia; Eritrea; Djibouti
- Coordinates: 14.2417°N 40.3°E

The Danakil Desert (or Afar Desert) is a desert in northeast Ethiopia, southern Eritrea, and northwestern Djibouti. Situated in the Afar Triangle, it stretches across 136,956 square kilometres (52,879 mi^{2}) of arid terrain. It is inhabited by a few Afar, who engage in salt mining. The area is known for its volcanoes and extreme heat, with daytime temperatures surpassing 50 °C (122 °F). Less than 25 mm (1 in) of rainfall occurs each year. The Danakil Desert is one of the lowest and hottest places on Earth.

== Climate ==
Dallol (92 metres below sea level), has the highest average temperature recorded on earth. Dallol features an extreme version of a hot desert climate (Köppen climate classification BWh) typical of the Danakil Desert. Dallol is the hottest place year-round on the planet and currently holds the record high average temperature for an inhabited location on Earth, where an average annual temperature of 34.6 °C (94.3 °F) was recorded between the years 1960 and 1966. The annual average high temperature is 41.2 °C (105.4 °F) and the hottest month has an average high of 46.7 °C (116.1 °F). The highest temperature ever recorded is 49 °C (121 °F). In addition to being extremely hot year-round, the climate of the lowlands of the Danakil Depression is also extremely dry and hyperarid in terms of annual average rainy days as only a few days record measurable precipitation. The hot desert climate of Dallol is particularly hot due to the extremely low elevation, it being inside the tropics and near the hot Red Sea during winters, the very low seasonality impact, the constants of the extreme heat and the lack of nighttime cooling.

Climate data for Dallol & Danakil Desert (1940-2025) at 10 meters above ground level
Month	Jan	Feb	Mar	Apr	May	Jun	Jul	Aug	Sep	Oct	Nov	Dec	Year
Record high °C (°F)	39.2 (102.6)	42.6 (108.7)	44.8 (112.6)	46.1 (115.0)	47.6 (117.7)	48.4 (119.1)	48.4 (119.1)	47.6 (117.7)	46.8 (116.2)	44.2 (111.6)	41.6 (106.9)	40.1 (104.2)	48.4 (119.1)
Mean maximum °C (°F)	37.9 (100.2)	40.2 (104.4)	42.9 (109.2)	44.7 (112.5)	46.0 (114.8)	46.9 (116.4)	46.2 (115.2)	45.5 (113.9)	44.7 (112.5)	42.3 (108.1)	40.3 (104.5)	38.1 (100.6)	45.80 (114.44)
Mean daily maximum °C (°F)	36.1 (97.0)	36.1 (97.0)	38.9 (102.0)	40.6 (105.1)	44.4 (111.9)	46.7 (116.1)	45.6 (114.1)	45.0 (113.0)	42.8 (109.0)	41.7 (107.1)	39.4 (102.9)	36.7 (98.1)	41.2 (106.1)
Daily mean °C (°F)	30.3 (86.5)	30.5 (86.9)	32.5 (90.5)	33.9 (93.0)	36.4 (97.5)	38.6 (101.5)	38.7 (101.7)	37.6 (99.7)	37.3 (99.1)	35.6 (96.1)	33.2 (91.8)	30.8 (87.4)	34.6 (94.3)
Mean daily minimum °C (°F)	23.4 (74.1)	23.9 (75.0)	26.0 (78.8)	27.1 (80.8)	28.5 (83.3)	30.4 (86.8)	31.8 (89.2)	31 (88)	29.3 (84.7)	29.6 (85.3)	27.1 (80.8)	25.7 (78.3)	27.8 (82.1)
Mean minimum °C (°F)	20.7 (69.3)	21.6 (70.9)	22.4 (72.3)	24.4 (75.9)	26.1 (79.0)	27.2 (81.0)	28.9 (84.0)	28.1 (82.6)	27.8 (82.0)	25.5 (77.9)	23.8 (74.8)	21.4 (70.5)	19.65 (67.37)
Record low °C (°F)	17.4 (63.3)	16.0 (60.8)	18.1 (64.6)	21.1 (70.0)	22.8 (73.0)	24.5 (76.1)	22.0 (71.6)	23.0 (73.4)	24.1 (75.4)	22.5 (72.5)	20.0 (68.0)	17.6 (63.7)	16.0 (60.8)
Average precipitation mm (inches)	3 (0.1)	2 (0.1)	16 (0.6)	18 (0.7)	7 (0.3)	1 (0.0)	9 (0.4)	16 (0.6)	5 (0.2)	4 (0.2)	2 (0.1)	1 (0.0)	84 (3.3)
Average precipitation days (≥ 1 mm)	1.7	1.2	3.7	7.0	3.9	1.4	8.4	12.5	4.9	2.5	1.5	0.9	49.6
Average relative humidity (%)	54.5	55.2	52.2	48.5	47.1	42.5	44.2	46.2	51.5	43.9	42.0	50.4	48.2
Average dew point °C (°F)	16.62 (61.92)	16.99 (62.58)	17.56 (63.61)	18.56 (65.41)	19.30 (66.74)	18.62 (65.52)	19.87 (67.77)	20.71 (69.28)	21.47 (70.65)	17.46 (63.43)	14.94 (58.89)	16.03 (60.85)	18.18 (64.72)
Mean monthly sunshine hours	266	250	273	268	309	257	192	188	230	276	294	307	3,110
Percentage possible sunshine	75.3	73.7	73.4	72.6	79.1	66.9	48.4	48.5	63.4	75.4	85.2	87.7	70.8
Average ultraviolet index	10.5	12	14	14.5	13	11	11.5	11.5	11.5	10.5	9.5	9.5	11.6

Mean theoretical maximum sunshine hours
Mois	Jan	Feb	Mar	Apr	May	Jun	Jul	Aug	Sep	Oct	Nov	Dec	Année
Mean monthly sunshine hours	310	295	310	320	350	360	335	340	330	325	310	305	3 890

== Geology ==
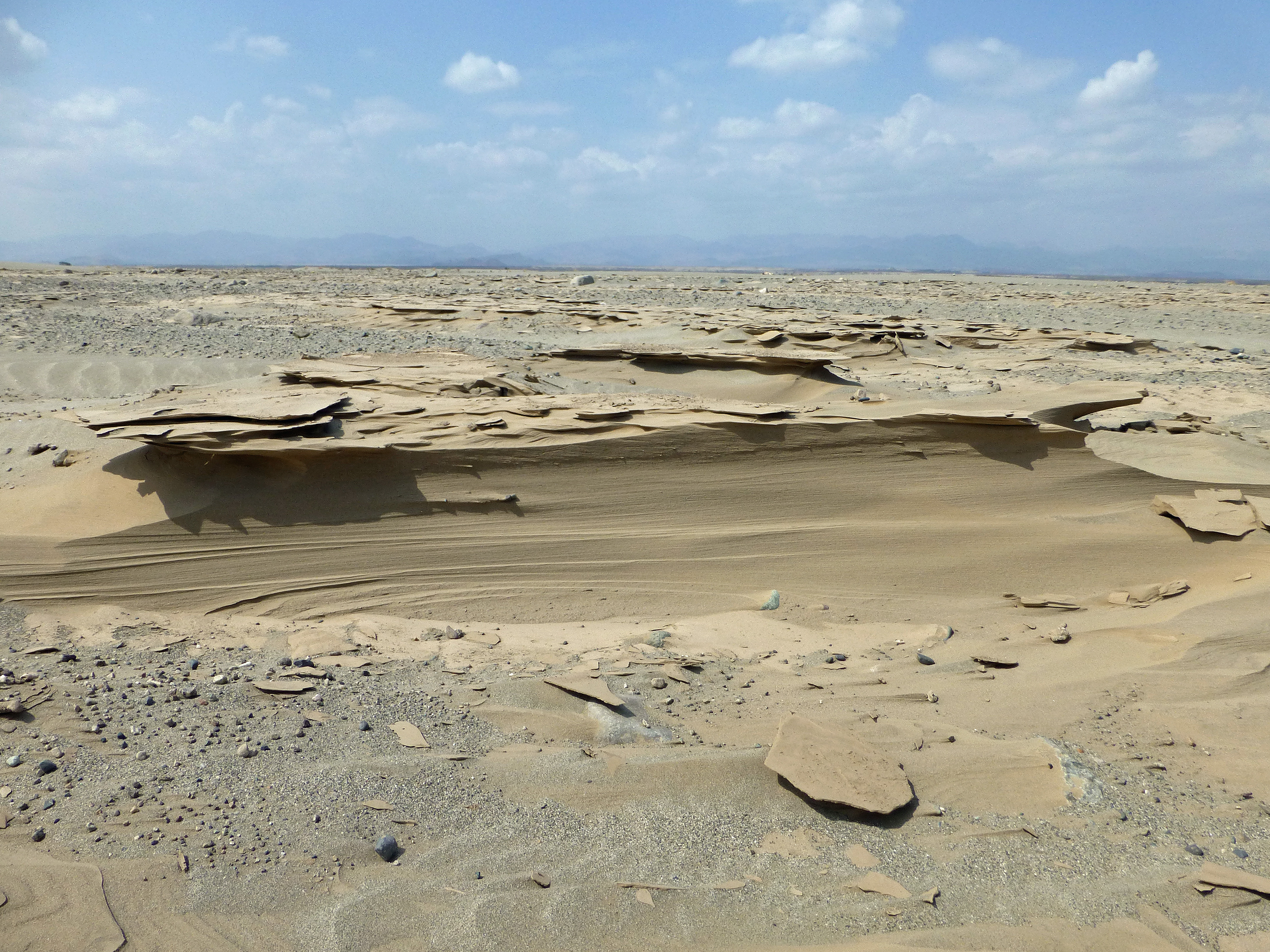
Danakil landscape

Local geology is characterized by volcanic and tectonic activity, various climate cycles, and discontinuous erosion. The basic geological structure of this area was caused by the movement of tectonic plates as Africa moved away from Asia. Mountain chains formed and were eroded again during the Paleozoic. Inundations by the sea caused the formation of layers of sandstone, and limestone was deposited further offshore. As the land rose again, further sandstone formed above the limestone. Further tectonic shifts caused lava to pour out of cracks and cover the sedimentary deposits.

The Danakil Desert has a number of lakes formed by lava flows that dammed up several valleys. Among these is Lake Afrera, which has thick saline crusts on its banks. Other areas of the Danakil became sinks, dry endorheic basins as precipitation evaporates faster than it can collect in permanent lakes. The area is flanked toward the east by the Danakil Alps, a tabular mountain system that has a few volcanic cones which peak in height in Mount Ramlo (2,130 metres (6,990 ft)).

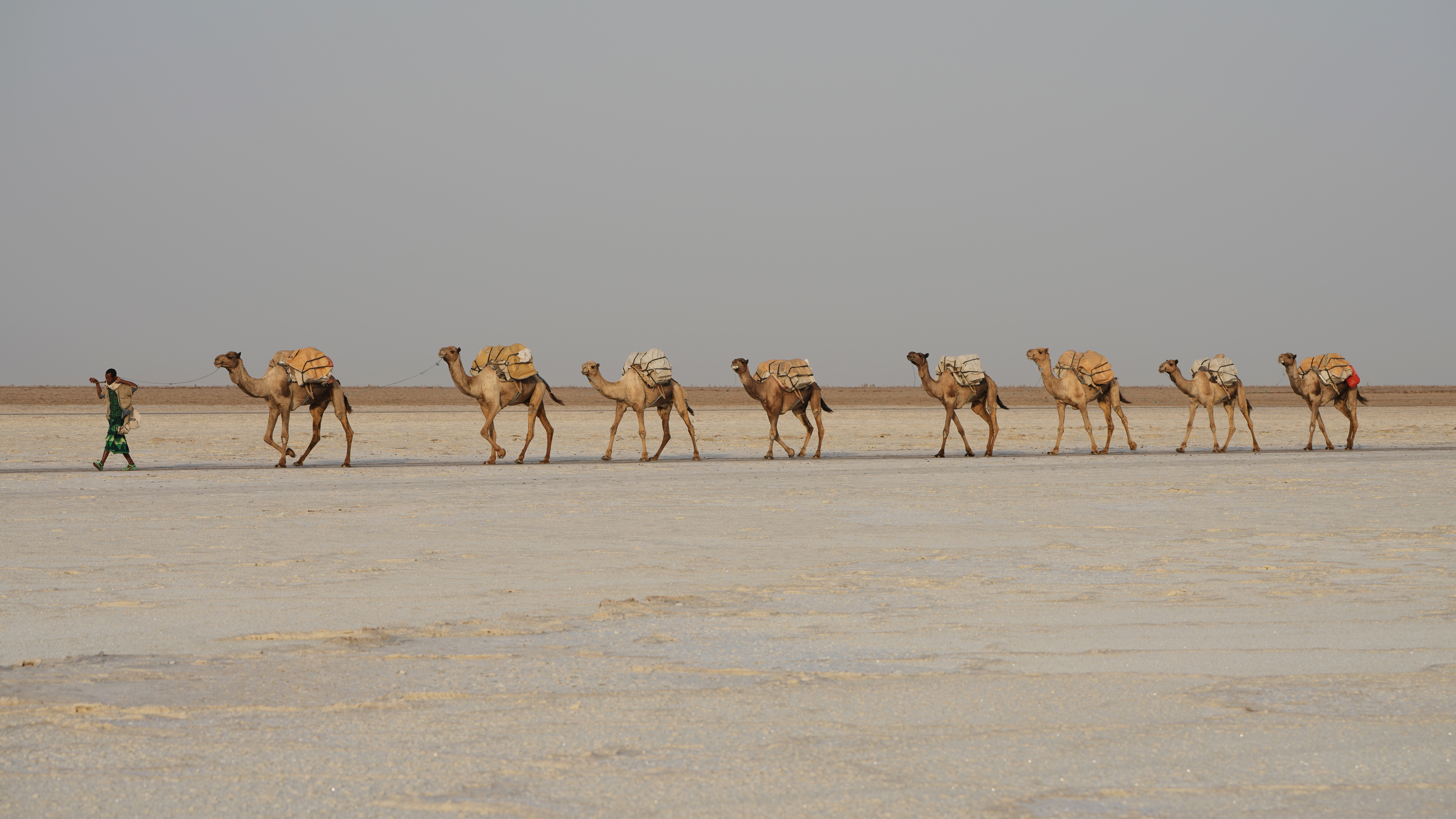
Salt transport by a camel train on Lake Karum

The land surrounding the Danakil Depression was once part of the Red Sea. The salt deposits were created when water from the Red Sea flooded the area and then evaporated. The most recent flood was roughly 30,000 years ago. While the water is gone, salt remains in extraordinarily large quantities, and has proven to be a valuable — and fatal — commodity for locals.

A deposit of salt up to 800 metres (2,600 ft) thick can also be found in the Salt Plain flatlands. Other local lakes include Lake Asale (116 metres (381 ft) below sea level) and Lake Giuletti/Afrera 80 metres (260 ft) below sea level, both of which possess cryptodepressions in the Danakil Depression. The Afrera contains many active volcanoes, including the Maraho, Dabbahu, Afdera and Erta Ale.

== Human presence ==
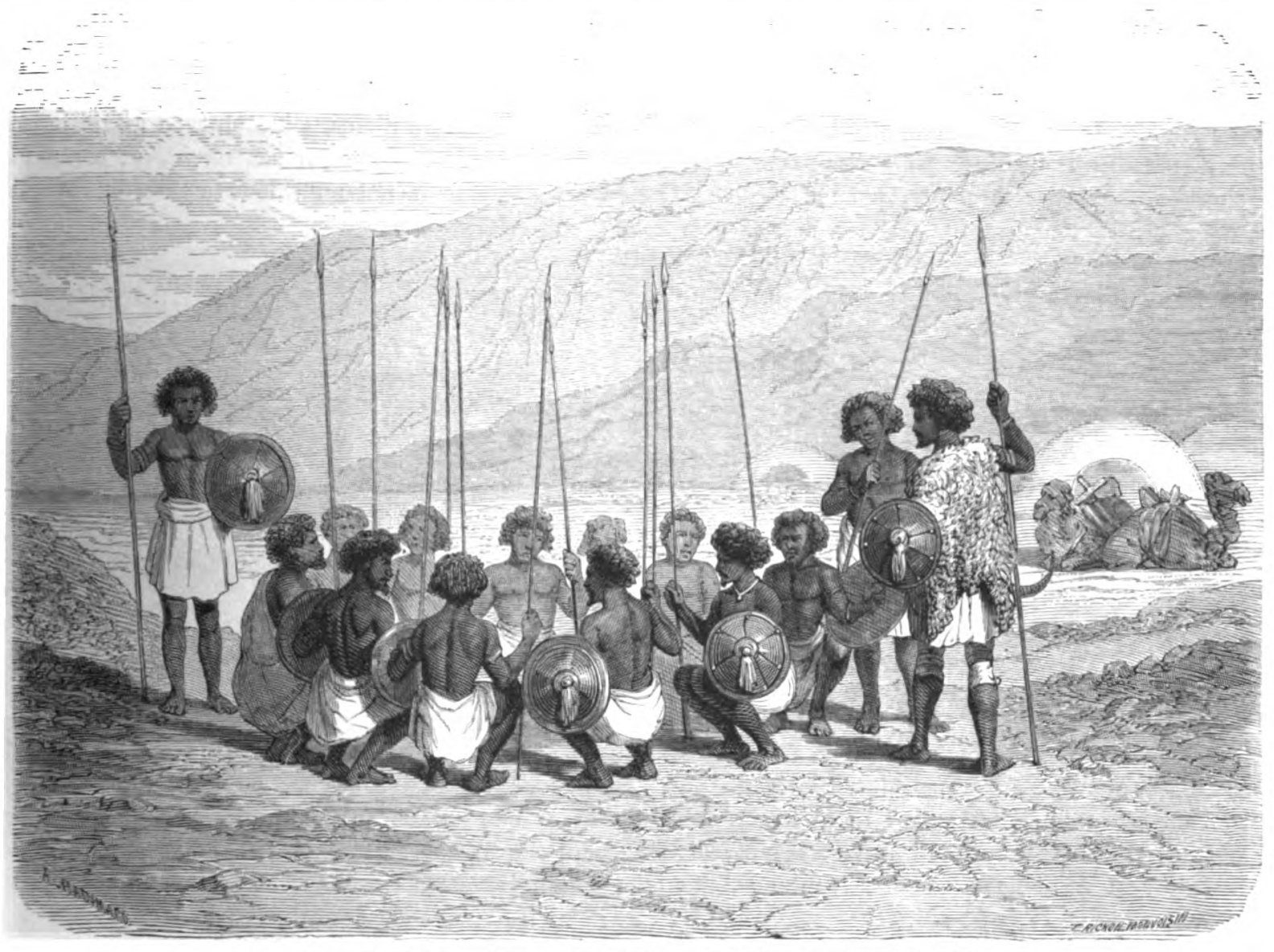
Afar men in the Danakil Desert, circa 1862

In 1974, anthropologists discovered an Australopithecus afarensis fossil at Hadar, Ethiopia in the Awash Valley. The remains were found to be female and named Lucy.

The Afar people mine salt, loading each of their camels with up to thirty salt bricks weighing four kilograms each. It will then take two days to get to the nearest town, with guards watching the camels and guarding them from bandits. There is a project to flood the depression by carrying out a channel from the ocean. In the past, salt was used as a form of currency in the region, but now the miners use regular cash to conduct transactions.

== See also ==
- Eritrean coastal desert
- Guban desert
