= Borale Ale =

Ethiopian stratovolcano

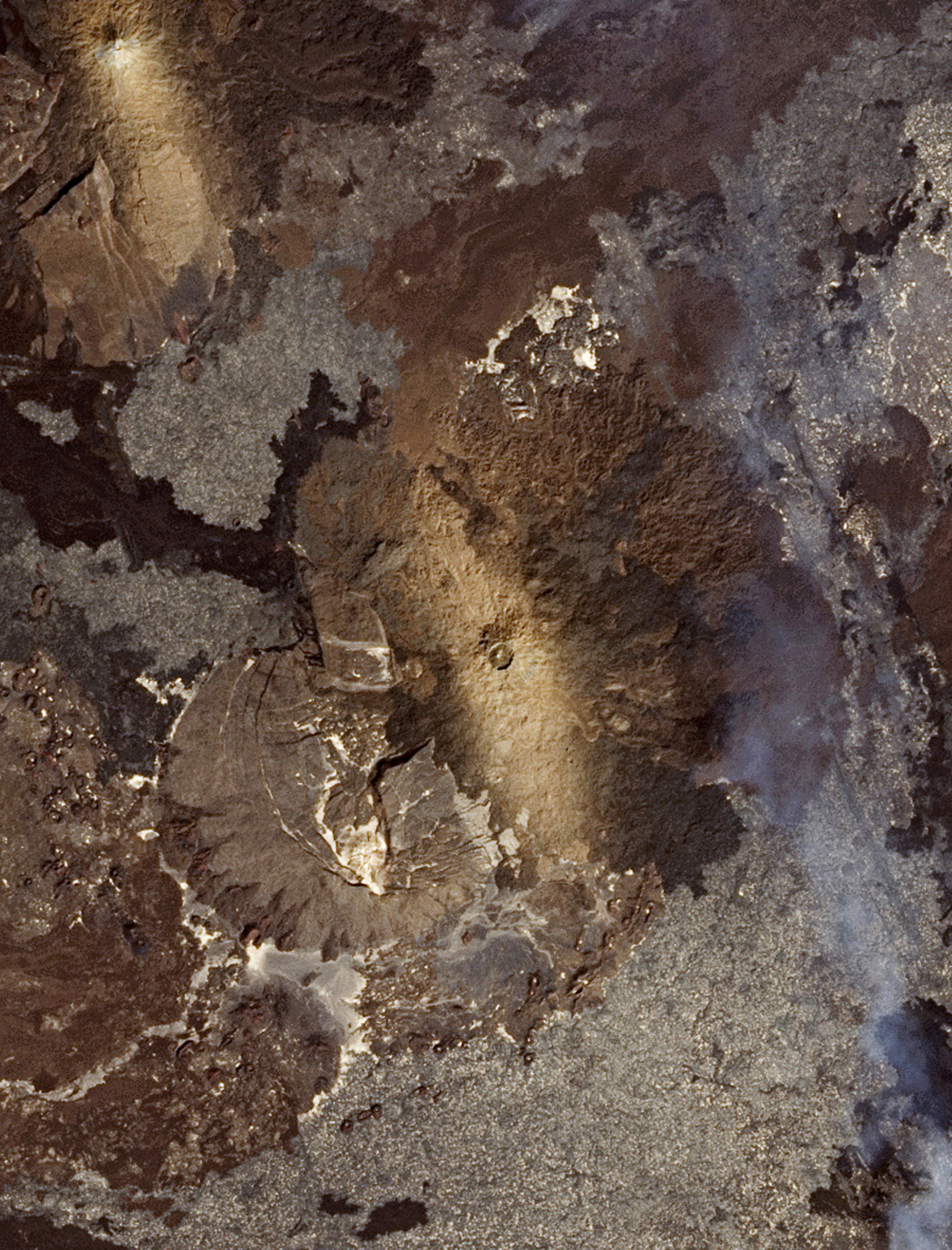
- Borale Ale volcano (centre) in a 2017 image taken during the eruption of Erta Ale volcano.

Highest point
- Elevation: 668 m (2,192 ft)
- Listing: List of volcanoes in Ethiopia
- Coordinates: 13°43′30″N 40°35′51″E

Geography
- Location within Ethiopia
- Location: Afar Region, Ethiopia
- Parent range: Erta Ale Range

Geology
- Mountain type: Stratovolcano
- Last eruption: Unknown

Borale Ale is a stratovolcano located in the Great Rift Valley, Ethiopia.

It is part of the Erta Ale Volcanic Segment in the northern Afar Region of Ethiopia, which contains seven volcanoes including Erta Ale, Alu, and Dalafilla. The mountain consists of two structures: a stratovolcano reaching 625 meters in elevation, surrounded by a shield volcano composed dominantly of fissural lavas.

== See also ==
- List of stratovolcanoes
