= Dallol (hydrothermal system) =

Terrestrial hydrothermal system of Danakil Depression in northeastern Ethiopia

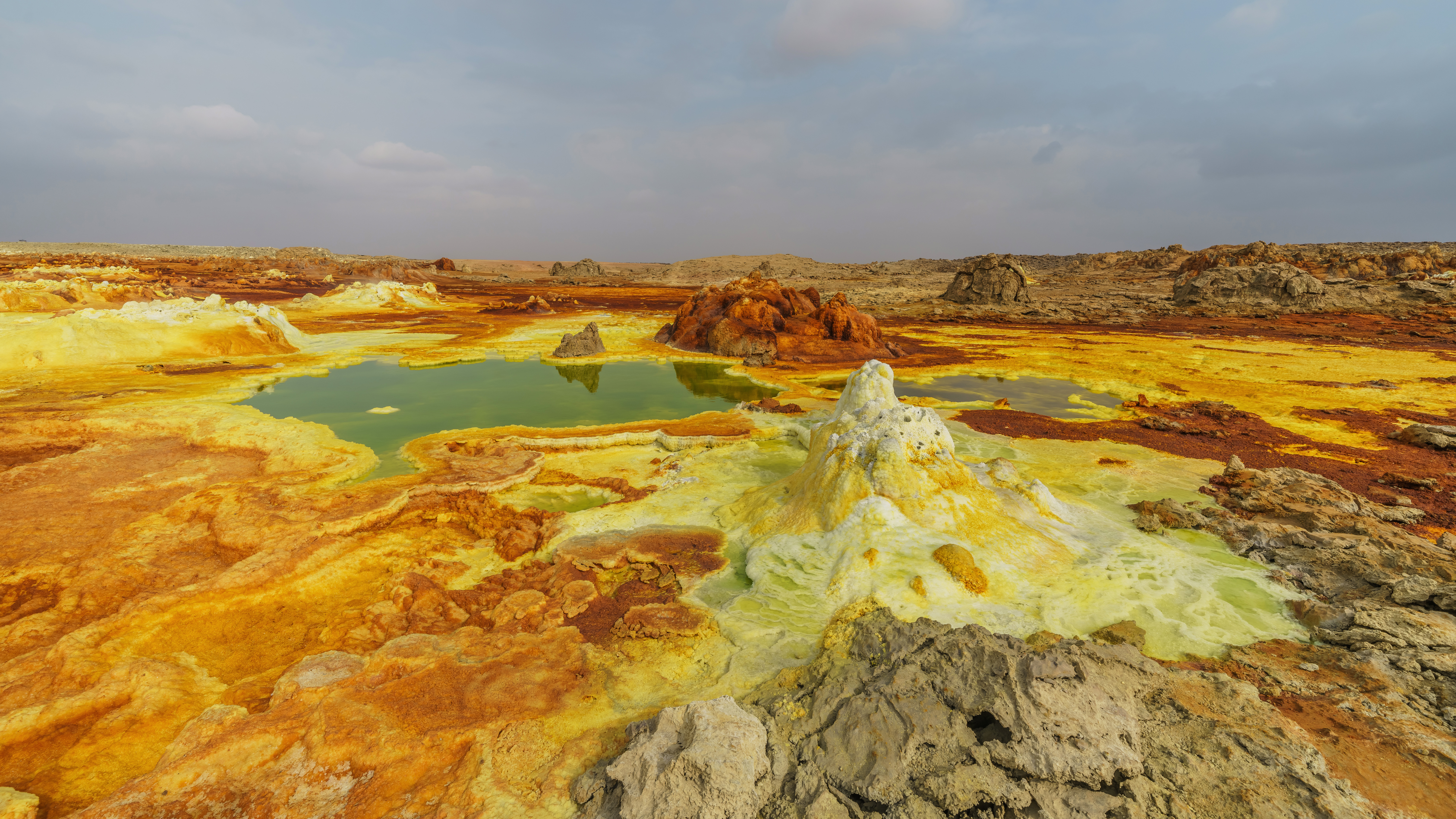

Highest point
- Elevation: −48 m (−157 ft)
- Coordinates: 14°14′30″N 40°18′00″E

Geography
- Location within Ethiopia
- Location: Ethiopia
- Parent range: Danakil Depression

Geology
- Mountain type: Explosion craters
- Last eruption: 2011

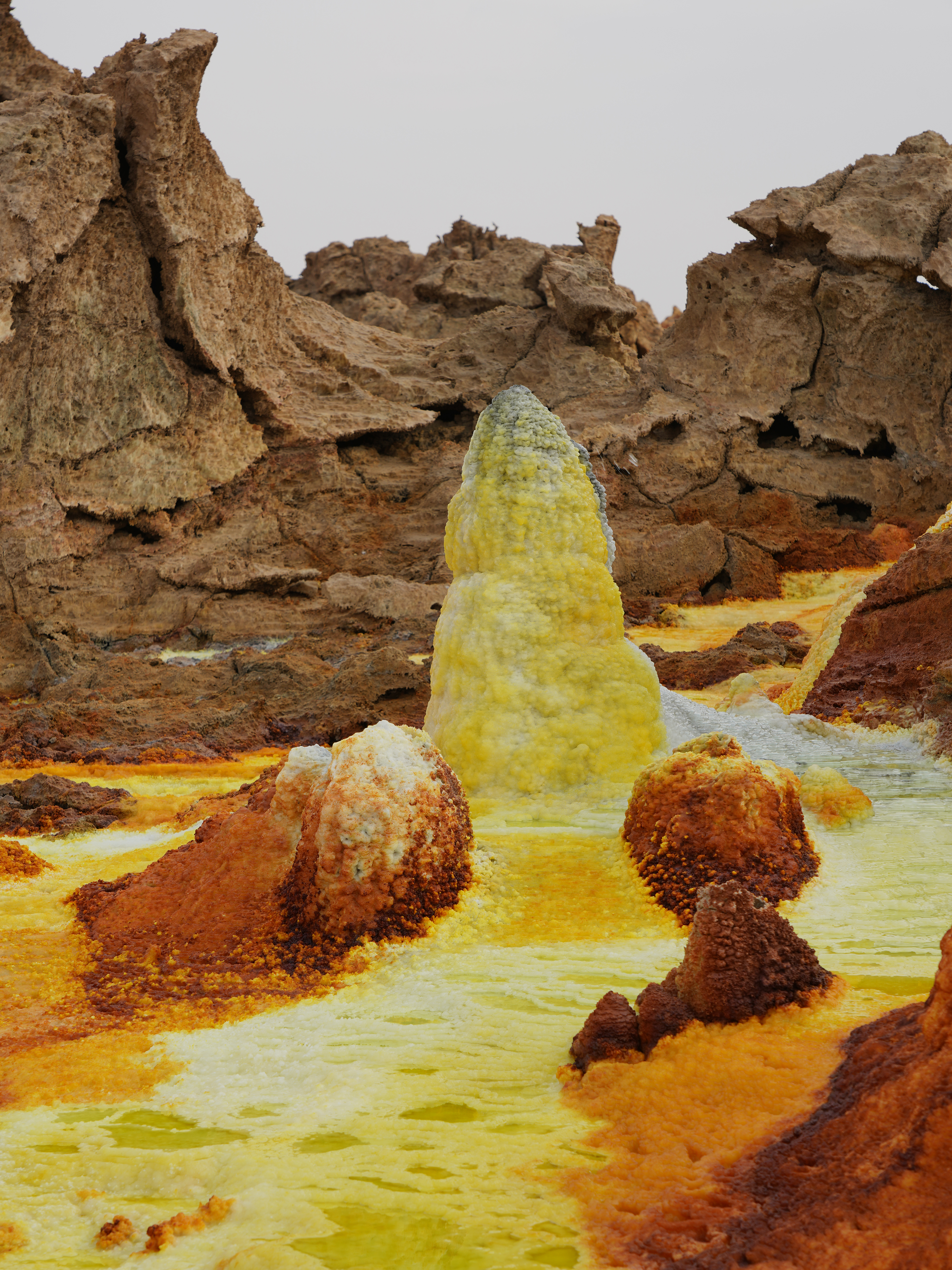
Salt, iron, and sulfur deposits create these intense colors in Dallol, Ethiopia

Dallol is a terrestrial hydrothermal system around a cinder cone volcano in the Danakil Depression, northeast of the Erta Ale Range in Ethiopia. It is known for its unearthly colors and mineral patterns, and the very acidic fluids, commonly noted as some of the most acidic on Earth, that discharge from its hydrothermal springs.

== Etymology ==
The term Dallol was coined by the Afar people and means dissolution or disintegration, describing a landscape of green acid ponds and geysers (pH-values less than 1) and iron oxide, sulfur and salt desert plains.

== Description ==
Dallol Mountain covers about 3 by 1.5 km (1.9 by 0.9 mi), and rises about 60 m (200 ft) above the surrounding salt plains. A circular depression near the centre is probably a collapsed crater. The southwestern slopes have water-eroded salt canyons, pillars, and blocks. There are numerous saline springs and fields of small fumaroles.

Numerous hot springs discharge brine and acidic liquid. Small, widespread, temporary geysers produce cones of salt. The Dallol deposits include significant bodies of potash found directly at the surface. The yellow, ochre and brown colourings are the result of the presence of iron and other impurities. Older, inactive springs tend to be dark brown because of oxidation processes.

== Formation ==
Dallol was formed by the intrusion of basaltic magma into Miocene salt deposits and subsequent hydrothermal activity. Phreatic eruptions took place here in 1926, forming Dallol Volcano; numerous other eruption craters dot the salt flats nearby. These craters are the lowest known subaerial volcanic vents in the world, at 45 m (148 ft) or more below sea level. In October 2004, the shallow magma chamber beneath Dallol deflated and fed a magma intrusion southwards beneath the rift. The most recent signs of activity occurred in January 2011 in what may have been a degassing event from deep below the surface.

== Physical properties ==
Dallol lies in the evaporitic plain of the Danakil Depression at the Afar Triangle, in the prolongation of the Erta Ale basaltic volcanic range. The intrusion of basaltic magma in the marine sedimentary sequence of Danakil resulted in the formation of a salt dome structure, where the hydrothermal system is hosted. The age of the hydrothermal system is unknown and the latest phreatic eruption that resulted in the formation of a 30 m (100 ft) diameter crater within the dome, took place in 1926. The wider area of Dallol is known as one of the driest and hottest places on the planet. It is also one of the lowest land points, lying 125 m (410 ft) below mean sea level. Other known hydrothermal features nearby Dallol are Gaet'Ale Pond and Black Lakes.

The hydrothermal springs of Dallol discharge anoxic, hyper-acidic (pH < 0), hyper-saline (almost 10 times more saline than seawater), high temperature (hotter than 108 °C or 226 °F) brines that contain more than 26 g/L of iron. The main gases emitted from the springs and fumaroles are carbon dioxide, hydrogen sulfide, nitrogen, sulfur dioxide; and traces of hydrogen, argon, and oxygen. Although several other hyper-acidic (pH < 2) volcanic systems exist, mainly found in crater lakes and hydrothermal sites, the pH values of Dallol decrease far below zero. The coexistence of such extreme physicochemical characteristics (pH, salinity, high temperature, lack of oxygen, etc.) render Dallol one of the very few ‘poly-extreme’ sites on Earth. This is why Dallol is a key system for astrobiological studies investigating the limits of life.

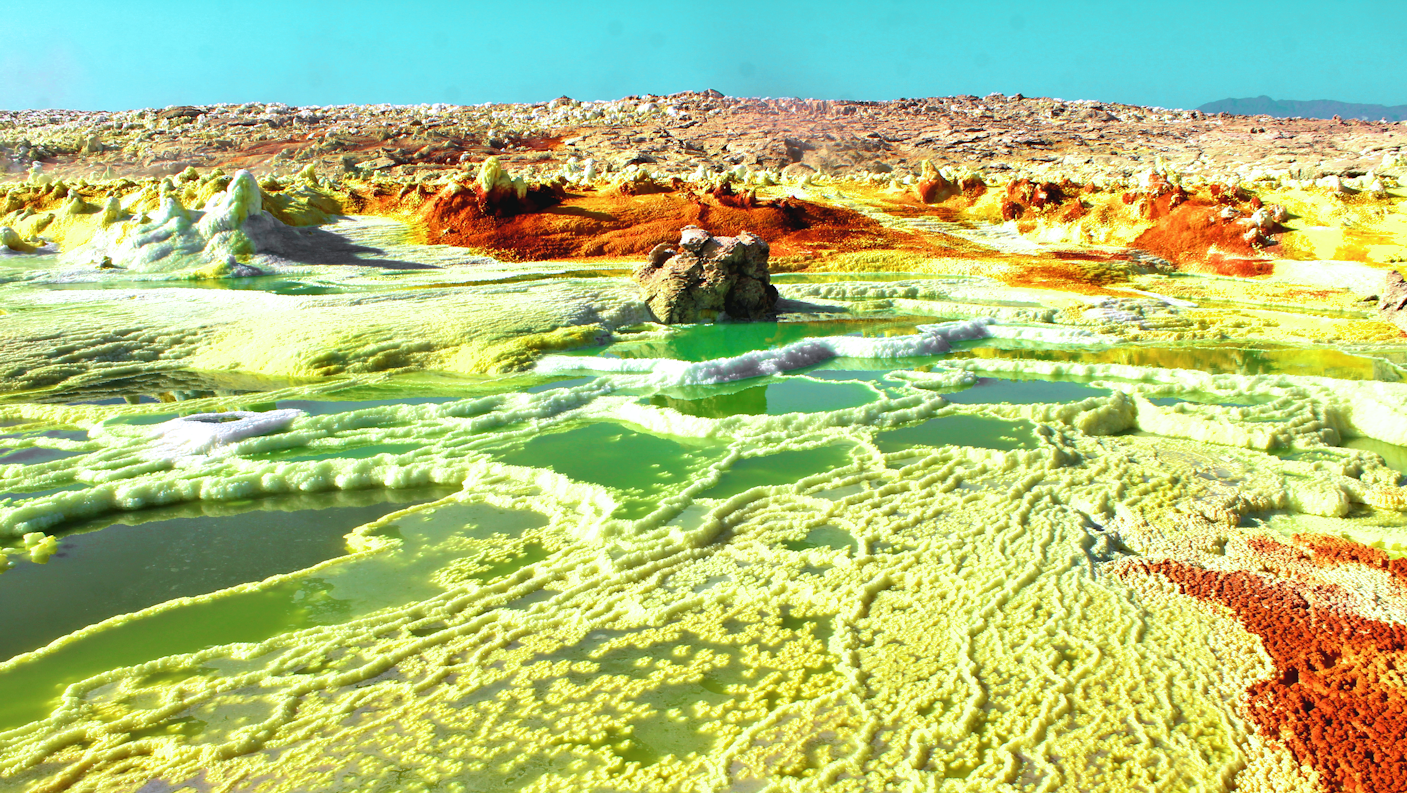
Hydrothermal chimneys, salt pillars and terraces of Dallol, Ethiopia.

Dallol is highly dynamic; active springs go inactive and new springs emerge in new places in the range of days, and this is also reflected in the colors of the site that change with time, from white to green, lime, yellow, gold, orange, red, purple and ochre. In contrast to other hydrothermal systems known for their colorful pools (e.g. Grand Prismatic Spring), where the colors are generated by biological activity, the color palette of Dallol is produced by the inorganic oxidation of the abundant iron phases. Dallol has a wide array of mineral patterns such as salt-pillars, miniature geysers, water-lilies, flower-like crystals, egg-shaped crusts, and pearl-like spheres. The main mineral phases encountered at Dallol are halite, jarosite, hematite, akaganeite and other Fe-oxyhydroxides, gypsum, anhydrite, sylvite and carnallite.

== Absence of life ==
In May 2019, a team reported for the first time evidence of life existing with the hot springs using a combination of morphological and molecular analyses. Ultra-small structures were shown to be entombed within mineral deposits, which were identified as members of the Order Nanohaloarchaea.

However, in October 2019, a French-Spanish team of scientists published an article in Nature Ecology & Evolution that concludes that while the salt plains are teeming with halophilic microorganisms, there is no life in Dallol's multi-extreme ponds due to the combination of hyperacidic and hypersaline environments, and the abundance of magnesium (which catalyzes the denaturation of biomolecules). In a follow-up paper published in Ecology and Evolution, one of the scientists noted that the rounded mineral nanoprecipitates they found could be confounded with microbial cells, if chemical mapping was not performed to reveal their silica-rich composition.

== History ==
The Dallol area lies up to 120 metres (390 ft) below sea level, and has been repeatedly flooded in the past when waters from the Red Sea have flowed into the depression. The last separation from the Red Sea was about 30,000 years ago.

The discovery of the volcano was by an Italian Colony, and they stayed there to extract sulfur. It dates from the first colonization and expeditions in the region, in the 17th or 18th century. But the hostility of the depression, the unbearable heat which reigns there, and the dangers of the site (acid basins, toxic fumes), did not favour the exploration of the zones close to the crater. On the contrary, the Erta Ale was much more accessible, especially because the part of the rift where it is located (called the Erta Ale Range), is significantly higher. The last eruption of this phreato-magmatic volcano dates back to 2011.

== Gallery ==
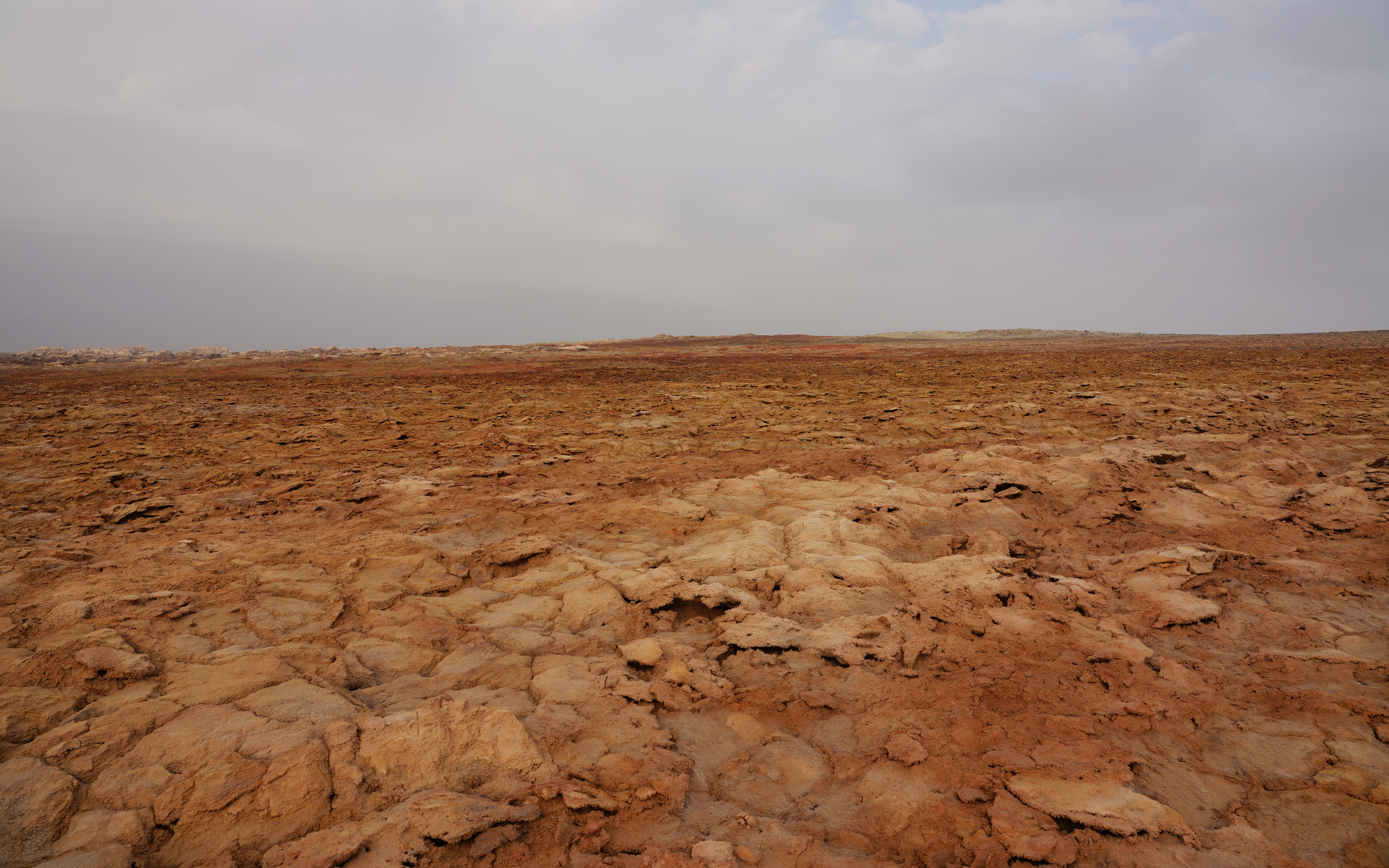
The Danakil desert seen from Dallol

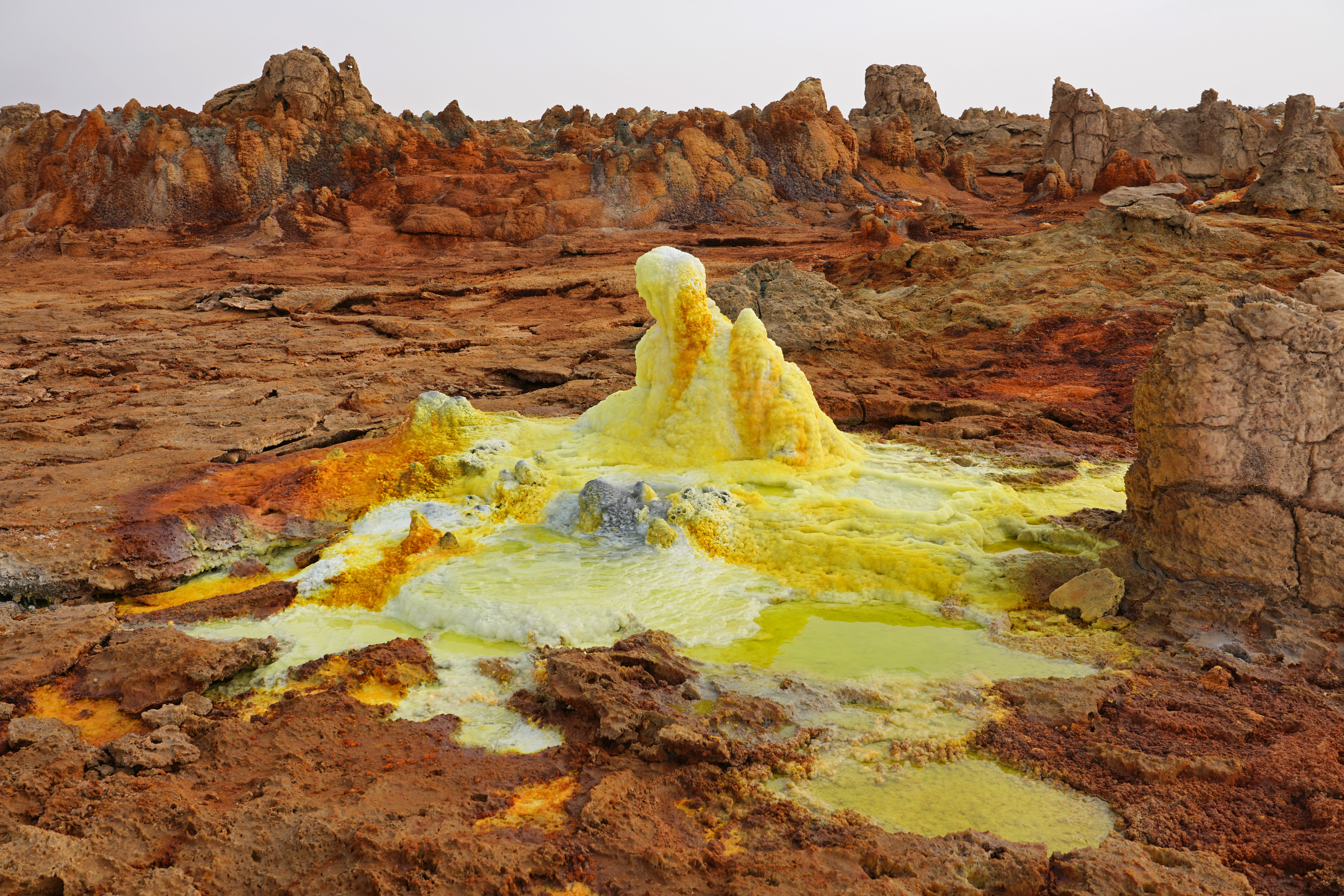
Salt and sulfur formations at Dallol

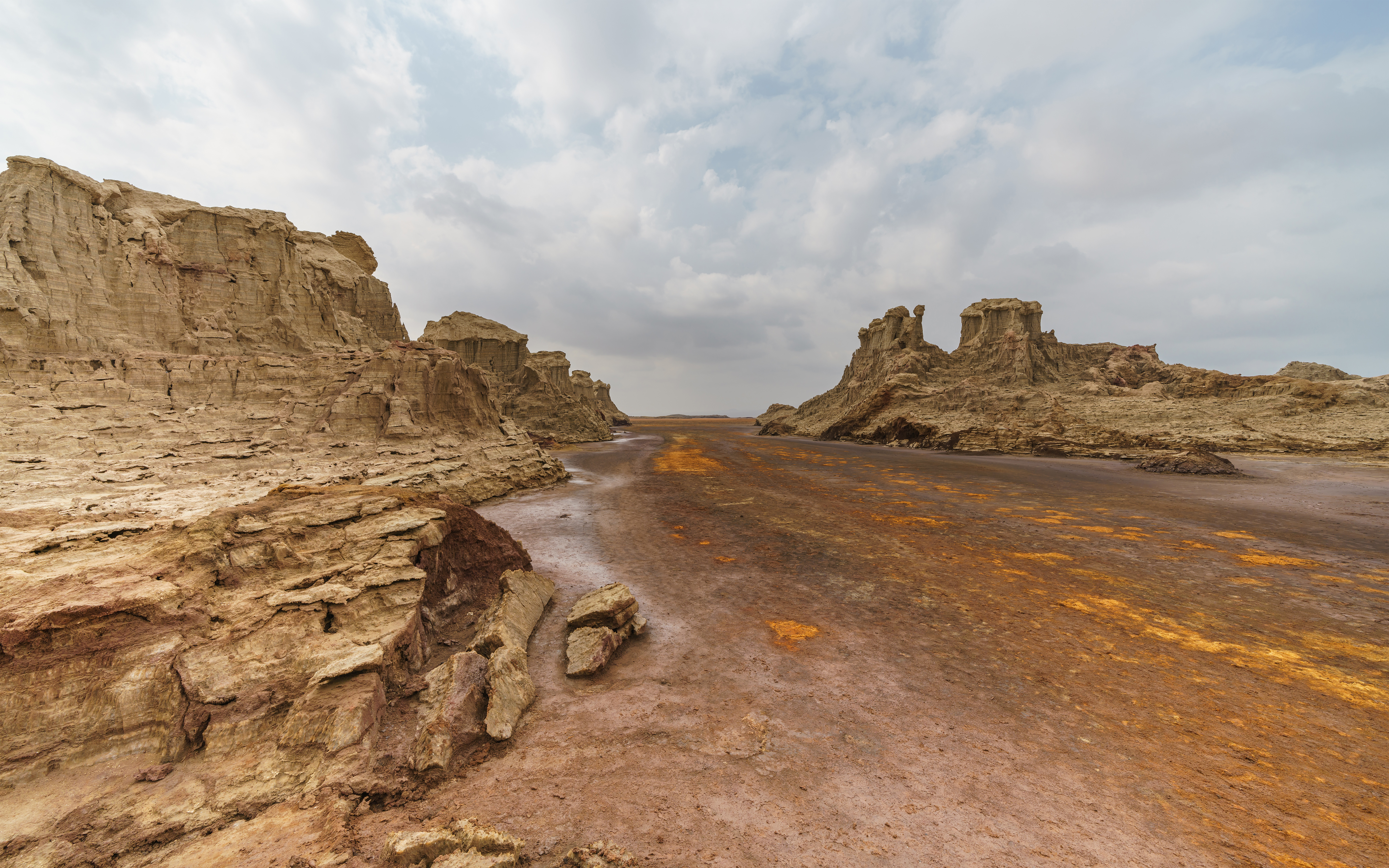
Salt canyons

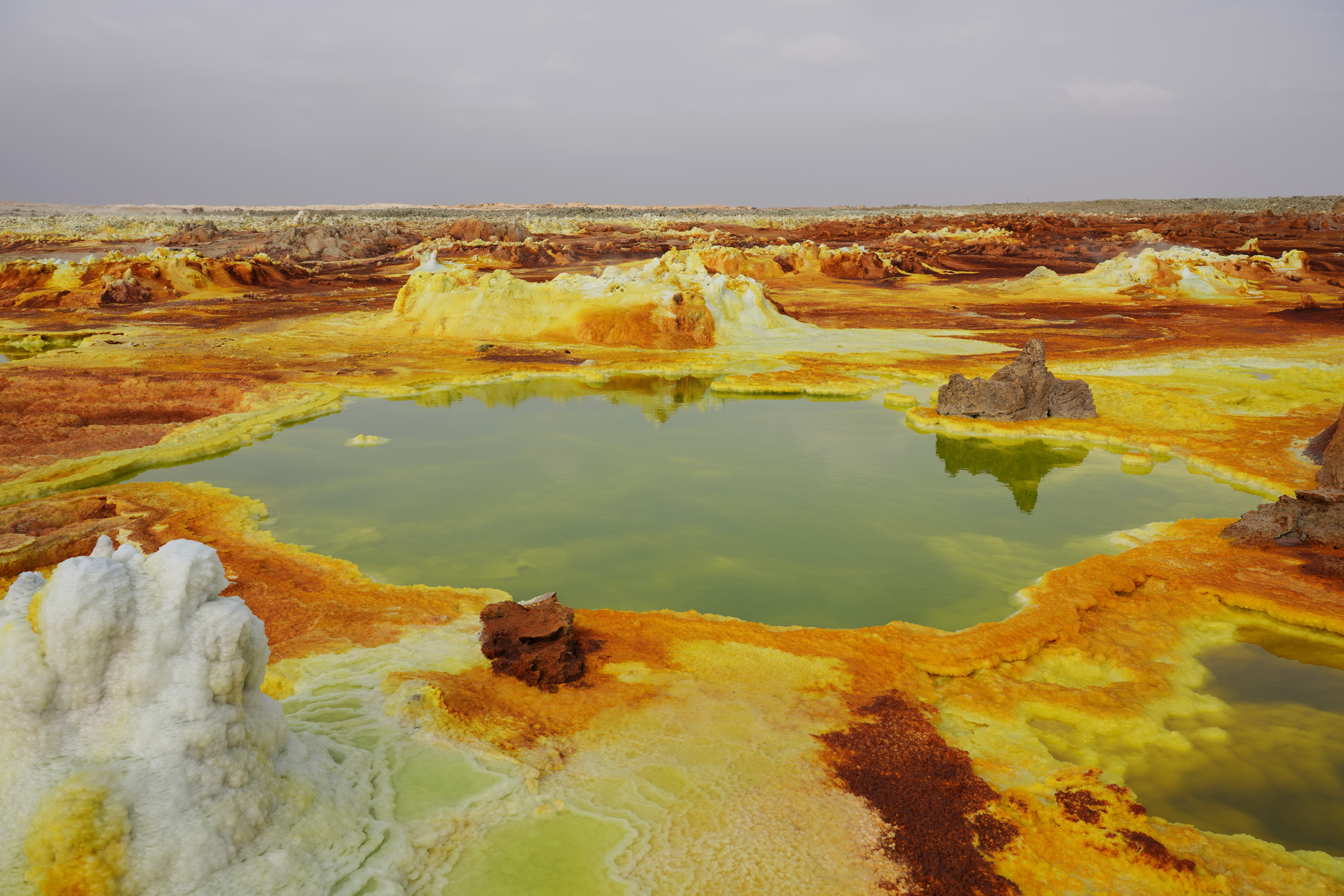
Sulfur ponds

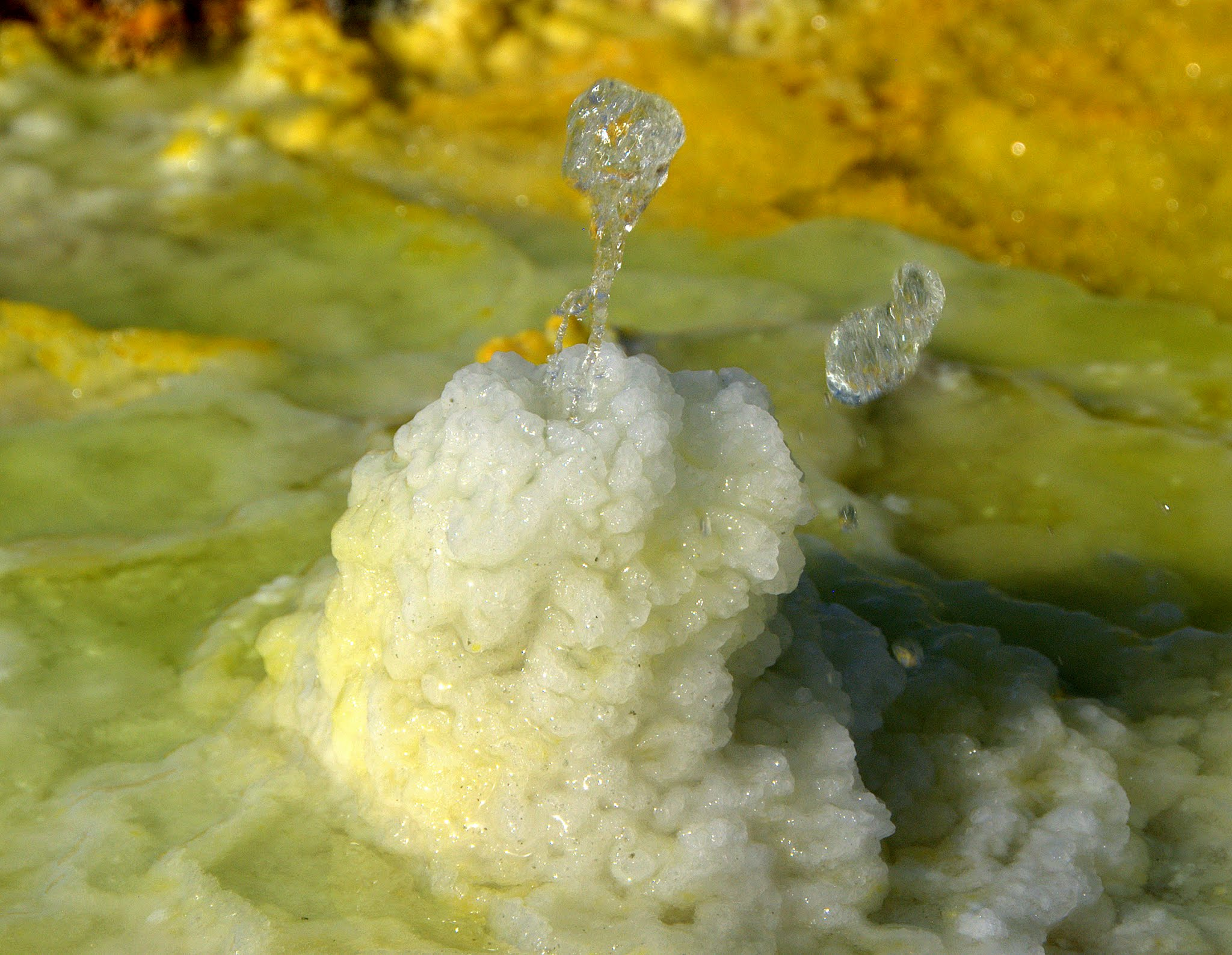
Dallol Salt Geyser

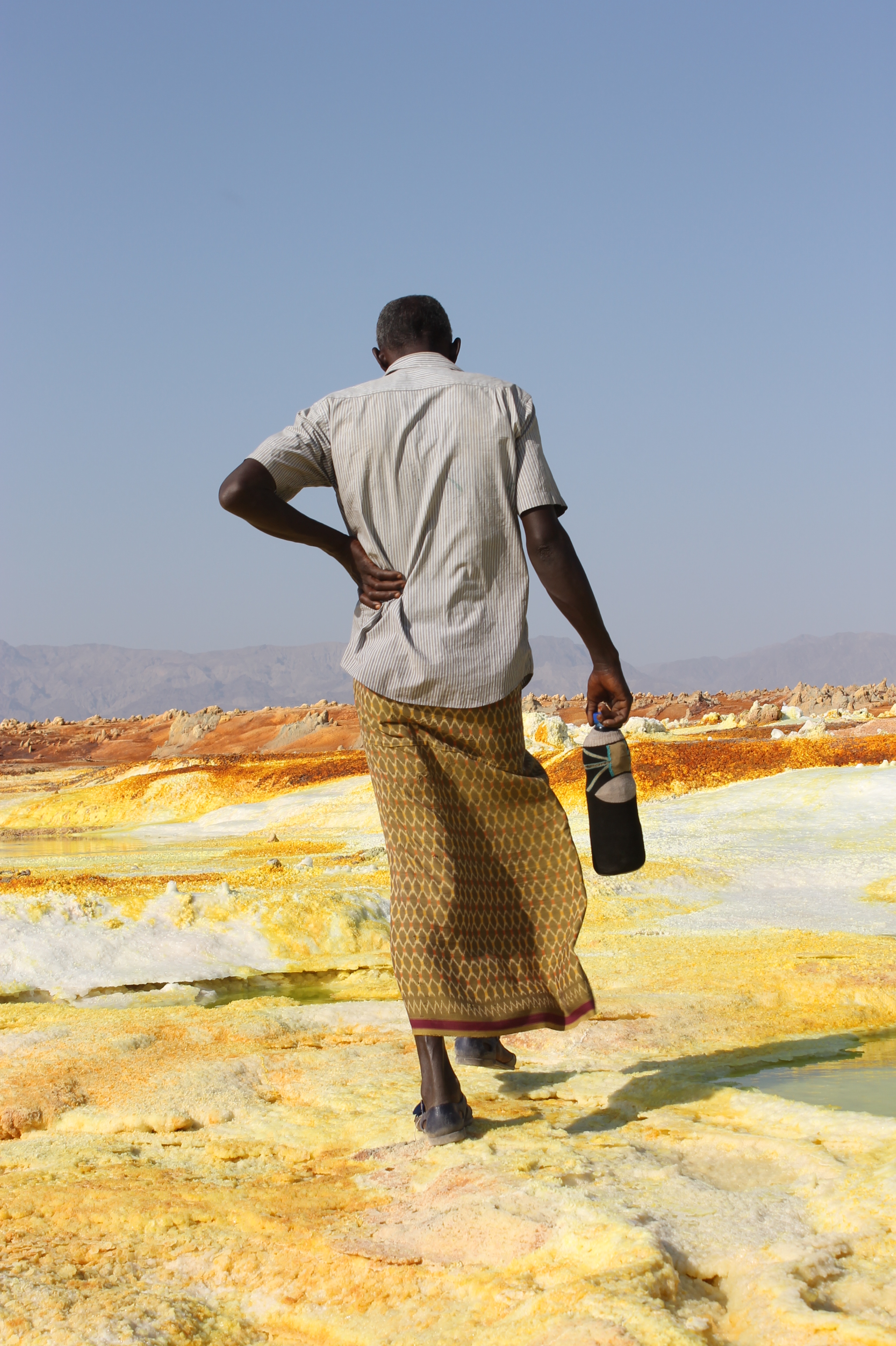
Guide walking on Dallol

== See also ==
- List of volcanoes in Ethiopia
- Dallol – a ghost town in the Dallol crater. It had the record high average temperature for an inhabited location on Earth.
- Blue lava

== Bibliography ==
- On the Volcanoes of the World episode The Horn of Africa (2008; Science Channel)
