= Dallol (ghost town) =

Ghost town in Afar Region, Ethiopia

Dallol ዳሎል
- Ghost town
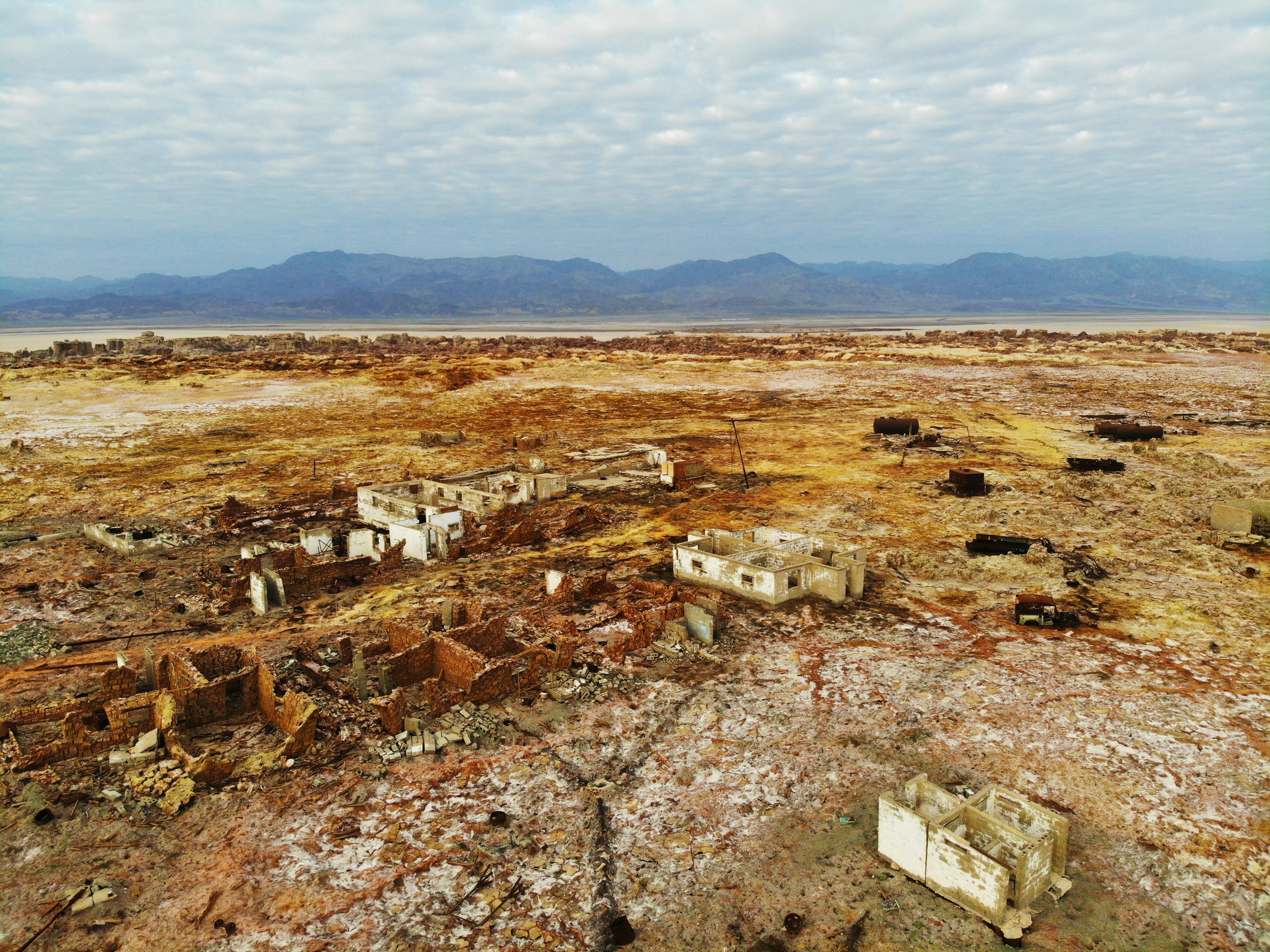
- Ruins of the town of Dallol, Ethiopia, an abandoned Italian sulfur mine.

- Location in Ethiopia
- Coordinates: 14°14′19″N 40°17′37″E
- Country: Ethiopia
- Region: Afar
- Zone: Kilbet Rasu
- Elevation: −130 m (−430 ft)

Population
  - Total: 0
- Time zone: UTC+03:00 (EAT)

Dallol (Amharic: ዳሎል) is a locality in the Dallol woreda of northern Ethiopia. Located in Kilbet Rasu, Afar Region, in the Afar Depression, it has a latitude and longitude of 14°14′19″N 40°17′38″E with an elevation of about 130 metres (430 ft) below sea level. The Central Statistical Agency has not published an estimate for the 2005 population of the village, which has been described as a ghost town.

Dallol currently holds the official record for record high average temperature for an inhabited location on Earth, and an average annual temperature of 35 °C (95 °F) was recorded between 1960 and 1966. Dallol is also one of the most remote places on Earth, but paved roads in the area were built in 2015. Still, the most important mode of transport besides off-road vehicles are the camel caravans that travel to the area to collect salt.

In the region is the highly active hydrothermal system of Dallol, with numerous springs, terrace systems and fumaroles.

== History ==
A railway from the port of Mersa Fatma in Eritrea to a point 28 km (17 mi) from Dallol was completed in April 1918. Built from 1917 to 1918 by using the 600 mm (24 in) gauge Decauville system (ready-made sections of small-gauge track that can be rapidly assembled), it transported salt from the "Iron Point" rail terminal near Dallol via Kululli to the port.

== Economy ==
Potash production is said to have reached about 51,000 metric tons after the railway was constructed. Production was stopped after World War I because of large-scale supplies from Germany, the US, and the USSR. Unsuccessful attempts to reopen production were made from 1920 to 1941. Between 1925 and 1929, an Italian company mined 25,000 tons of sylvite, averaging 70% KCl, which was transported by rail to Mersa Fatma. After World War II, the British administration dismantled the railway and removed all traces of it.

The Dallol Co. of Asmara sold a few tons of salt from the site to India in 1951–1953. In the 1960s, the Parsons Company of the US, a mining company, conducted a series of geological surveys at Dallol. By 1965, about 10,000 holes had been drilled at 65 locations.

Dallol became more known in the West in 2004 when it was featured in the Channel 4/National Geographic documentary Going to Extremes. As of 2004, some buildings still stand in Dallol, all built with salt blocks.

== Climate ==
Dallol features an extreme version of a hot desert climate (Köppen climate classification BWh) typical of the Danakil Desert. Dallol is the hottest place year-round on the planet and currently holds the record high average temperature for an inhabited location on Earth, where an average annual temperature of 34.6 °C (94.3 °F) was recorded between the years 1960 and 1966. The annual average high temperature is 41.2 °C (106.1 °F) and the hottest month has an average high of 46.7 °C (116.1 °F). The highest temperature ever recorded is 49 °C (120 °F). In addition to being extremely hot year-round, the climate of the lowlands of the Danakil Depression is also extremely dry and hyperarid in terms of annual average rainy days as only a few days record measurable precipitation. The hot desert climate of Dallol is particularly hot due to the extremely low elevation, it being inside the tropics and near the hot Red Sea during winters, the very low seasonality impact, the constants of the extreme heat and the lack of nighttime cooling.

Dallol

Climate chart (precipitation, max. and min. temperature)
J	F	M	A	M	J	J	A	S	O	N	D
0 36 25	0 36 25	0 39 26	0 41 27	0 44 29	0 47 30	0 46 32	0 45 31	0 43 32	0 42 30	0 39 27	0 37 26
- █ Average max. and min. temperatures in °C
- █ Precipitation totals in mm
- Source: Met Office
Imperial conversion
J	F	M	A	M	J	J	A	S	O	N	D
0 97 76	0 97 76	0 102 79	0 105 81	0 112 83	0 116 87	0 114 89	0 113 88	0 109 89	0 107 85	0 103 81	0 98 78
- █ Average max. and min. temperatures in °F
- █ Precipitation totals in inches

Climate data for Dallol (1960–1966)
Month	Jan	Feb	Mar	Apr	May	Jun	Jul	Aug	Sep	Oct	Nov	Dec	Year
Record high °C (°F)	39 (102)	42 (108)	48 (118)	46 (115)	49 (120)	48 (119)	49 (120)	48 (119)	48 (119)	46 (115)	44 (111)	41 (106)	49 (120)
Mean daily maximum °C (°F)	36.1 (97.0)	36.1 (97.0)	38.9 (102.0)	40.6 (105.1)	44.4 (111.9)	46.7 (116.1)	45.6 (114.1)	45.0 (113.0)	42.8 (109.0)	41.7 (107.1)	39.4 (102.9)	36.7 (98.1)	41.2 (106.1)
Daily mean °C (°F)	30.3 (86.5)	30.5 (86.9)	32.5 (90.5)	33.9 (93.0)	36.4 (97.5)	38.6 (101.5)	38.7 (101.7)	37.6 (99.7)	37.3 (99.1)	35.6 (96.1)	33.2 (91.8)	30.8 (87.4)	34.6 (94.3)
Mean daily minimum °C (°F)	24.6 (76.3)	24.6 (76.3)	26.0 (78.8)	27.1 (80.8)	28.5 (83.3)	30.4 (86.8)	31.8 (89.2)	31.1 (88.0)	31.6 (88.8)	29.6 (85.3)	27.1 (80.8)	25.7 (78.3)	28.2 (82.7)
Record low °C (°F)	22 (72)	22 (72)	21 (70)	21 (70)	23 (73)	25 (77)	24 (75)	24 (75)	27 (81)	26 (79)	24 (75)	24 (75)	21 (70)
