= Ale Bagu =

Mountain in Ethiopia

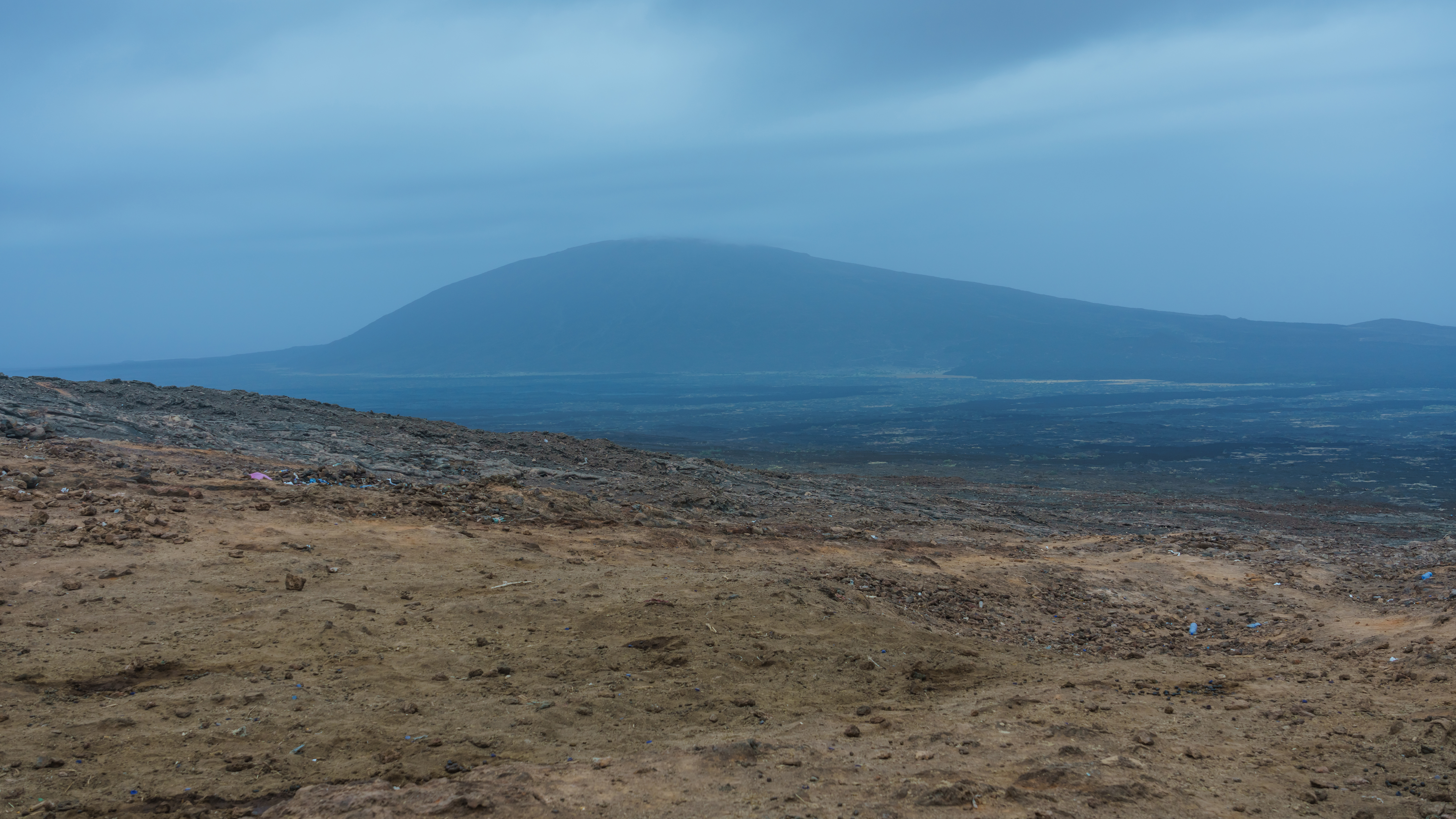
- View of Ale Bagu from Erta Ale

Highest point
- Elevation: 1,031 m (3,383 ft)
- Prominence: 1,084 m (3,556 ft)
- Listing: List of volcanoes in Ethiopia; Ribu
- Coordinates: 13.52°N 40.63°E

Geography
- Location: Afar Depression, Afar Region, Ethiopia
- Parent range: Erta Ale Range

Geology
- Mountain type: Stratovolcano
- Last eruption: 23 November 2025

Ale Bagu is a stratovolcano located in the Afar Region, Ethiopia. It is the highest volcano of Erta Ale Range. The village of El Dom sits at the base of Ale Bagu.

Ale Bagu is a rare example of a mountain with a prominence higher than its elevation figure. This is due to the key col being below sea level.

== See also ==
- Afar Depression
- Geography of Ethiopia
- List of volcanoes in Ethiopia
