= Dalaffilla =

Ethiopian stratovolcano

- Location within Ethiopia

Highest point
- Elevation: 578 m (1,896 ft)
- Coordinates: 13°47′27″N 40°33′16″E

Geography
- Location: Ethiopia

Geology
- Mountain type: Stratovolcano with Fissure vents
- Last eruption: 2008

Dalaffilla, also called Gabuli, or Alu-Dalafilla is a 578 m (1,896 ft) high stratovolcano in Ethiopia. It is the highest point of Gulina. The only recorded eruption of Dalaffilla occurred in 2008 when lava flows from its western and northwestern flanks traveled to the northeast.

Dalaffilla is part of the Erta Ale Volcanic Segment in the northern Afar Region of Ethiopia, which contains seven volcanoes including Erta Ale, Alu, Dalaffilla and Borale Ale. It has a shallow gradient in its lower section, but the upper portion of the volcano is extremely steep.

The Global Volcanism Program describes the volcano's location as "a hot, arid, and desolate rift basin" that lies up to 100 meters below sea level. Few people live in the area, which has limited monitoring and scientific observation of the volcano. For example, because there were no observers, it was not known at first which volcano in the area had erupted in 2008. Initial reports of the 2008 eruption claimed a level of lava output that turned out to be 20 times too large. The location of the eruption was also erroneously thought to be further east than it really was, due to older and imprecise maps.

Dalaffilla means "cut neck" in the Afar language.
