= Erta Ale Range =

Volcanic chain in Ethiopia

Coordinates: 13°36′N 40°40′E

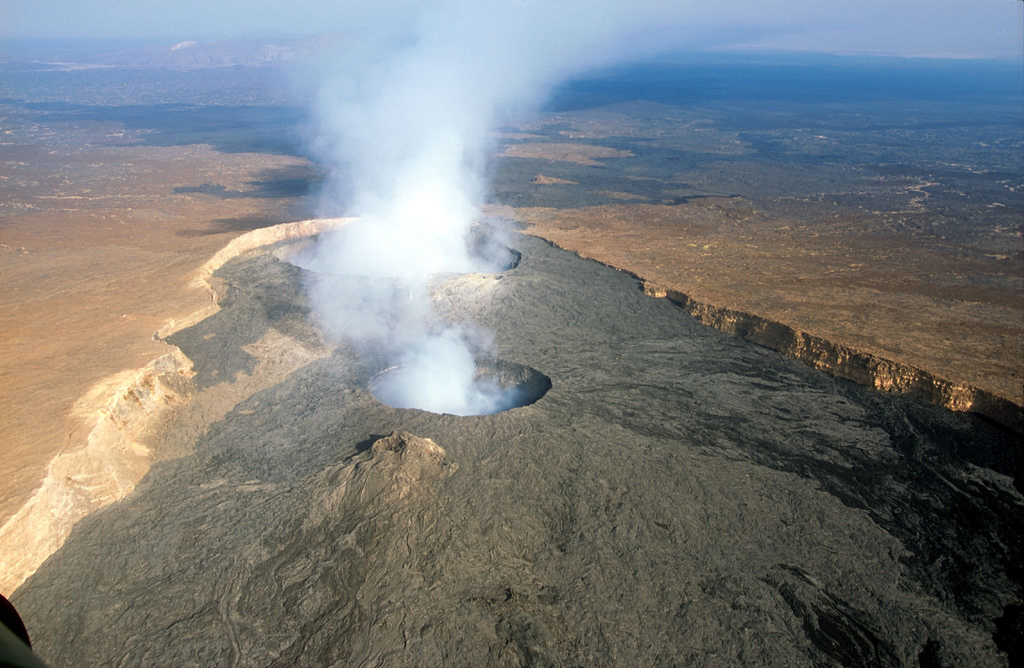
Erta Ale

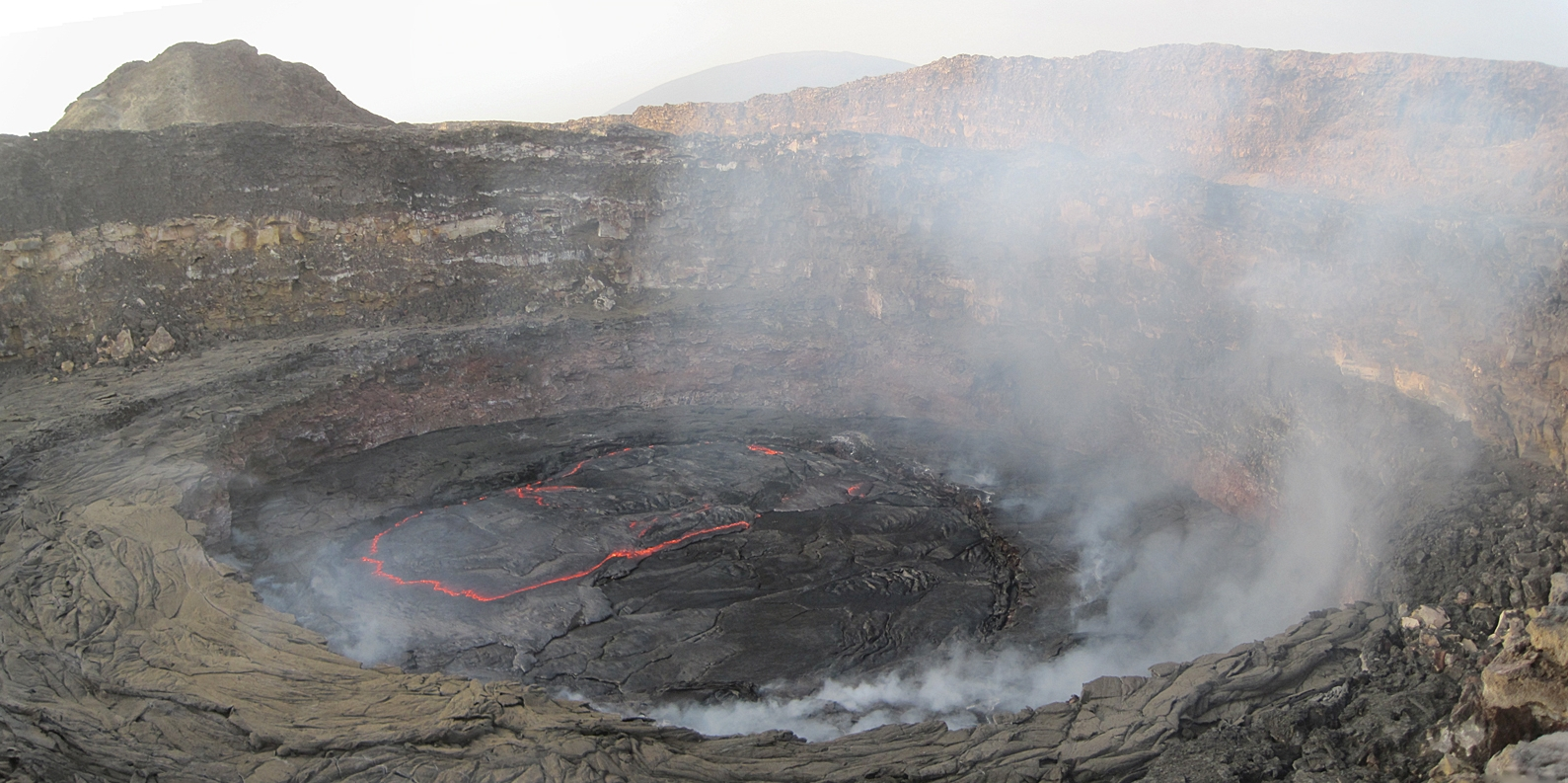
Summit caldera of Volcán Erta Ale (Etiopía), 2009

Erta Ale Range is the most important axial volcanic chain of the Afar Depression, Afar Region, Ethiopia. It consists mostly of shield volcanoes.

The active volcano Erta Ale is a prominent feature of the range. The highest volcano of the range is Ale Bagu, with an elevation of 1,031 m (3,383 ft) above sea level. Other named peaks (with their elevations) include Alu (429 m (1,407 ft)), Dalaffilla (578 m (1,896 ft)) and Borale Ale (668 m (2,192 ft)). The southernmost Hayli Gubbi (493 m (1,617 ft)) erupted on 23 November 2025 according to scientific sources for the first time within the past 12,000 years.

== Erta Ale ==
Erta Ale is the most active volcano in Ethiopia and rises to 613 m (2,011 ft) at its highest point. It is one of many shield volcanoes in the area and is 50 km (31 mi) wide with a 1.6 kilometres (1 mi) elliptical summit containing many steep pit craters. Its perpetually active pit craters are renowned for their churning lava lakes.

== See also ==
- Danakil Alps
- Geography of Ethiopia
- List of volcanoes in Ethiopia
