= Erta Ale =

Active basaltic shield volcano in Afar Region, Ethiopia

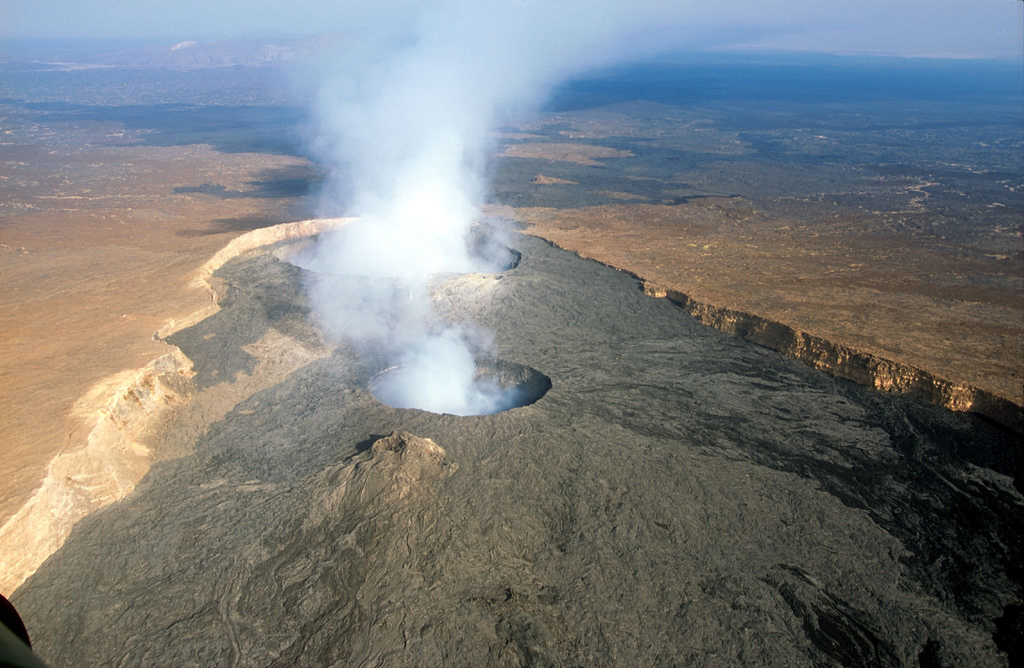
- Erta Ale in May 2008

Highest point
- Elevation: 613 m (2,011 ft)
- Listing: List of volcanoes in Ethiopia
- Coordinates: 13°36′23″N 40°39′41″E

Geography
- Location within Ethiopia
- Location: Afar Depression, Afar Region, Ethiopia
- Parent range: Erta Ale Range

Geology
- Mountain type: Shield volcano
- Last eruption: 2005 to 2025 and continuing

Erta Ale (or Ertale or Irta'ale; /ˈərtə ˈeɪl/ Amharic: ኤርታሌ) is a continuously active shield volcano in the Afar Region of northeastern Ethiopia, which is itself part of the wider Afar Triangle (a barren desert region straddling Djibouti, Ethiopia and Eritrea). The volcano is located in the Danakil Depression, an area on the border between Ethiopia and Eritrea that is below sea level. It is composed of basalt, and it is the most active of the volcanoes in Ethiopia.

== Geology ==
Erta Ale is 613 metres (2,011 ft) high, with one or sometimes two active lava lakes at the summit which occasionally overflow on the south side of the volcano. It is notable for holding the longest-existing lava lake, present since at least 1906. Volcanoes with lava lakes are rare: there were only eight in the world reported in 2019.

Erta Ale means "smoking mountain" in the local Afar language and its southernmost pit is known locally as "the gateway to hell". In 2009, it was mapped by a team from the BBC using three-dimensional laser techniques, in order for the mapping team to maintain a distance and avoid the lakes' searingly hot temperatures.

Erta Ale is located in the Afar triple junction where three tectonic plates split apart: the African plate, the Arabian plate and the Somali plate. Specifically, it lies almost at the end of the southern Red Sea Rift, where tectonic extension (via normal faults) proceeds in conjunction with igneous intrusions to generate a new oceanic crust between Africa and Arabia. The volcano comprises mainly mafic lavas which were brought up to the surface by dike emplacement during a rifting event.

A major eruption occurred on 25 September 2005 which killed 250 heads of livestock and forced thousands of nearby residents to flee. There was further lava flow in August 2007, forcing the evacuation of hundreds and leaving two missing. A new eruption started on November 3, 2008 at the Alu-Dalafilla volcanic centre, at the northern end of the Erta Ale range. The latest eruptive activity started in January 2017, with outpouring of lava flows extending for kilometers from the vent, and lasted until March 2020; volcanic pulses have occurred since that time, lasting until at least April 2024.

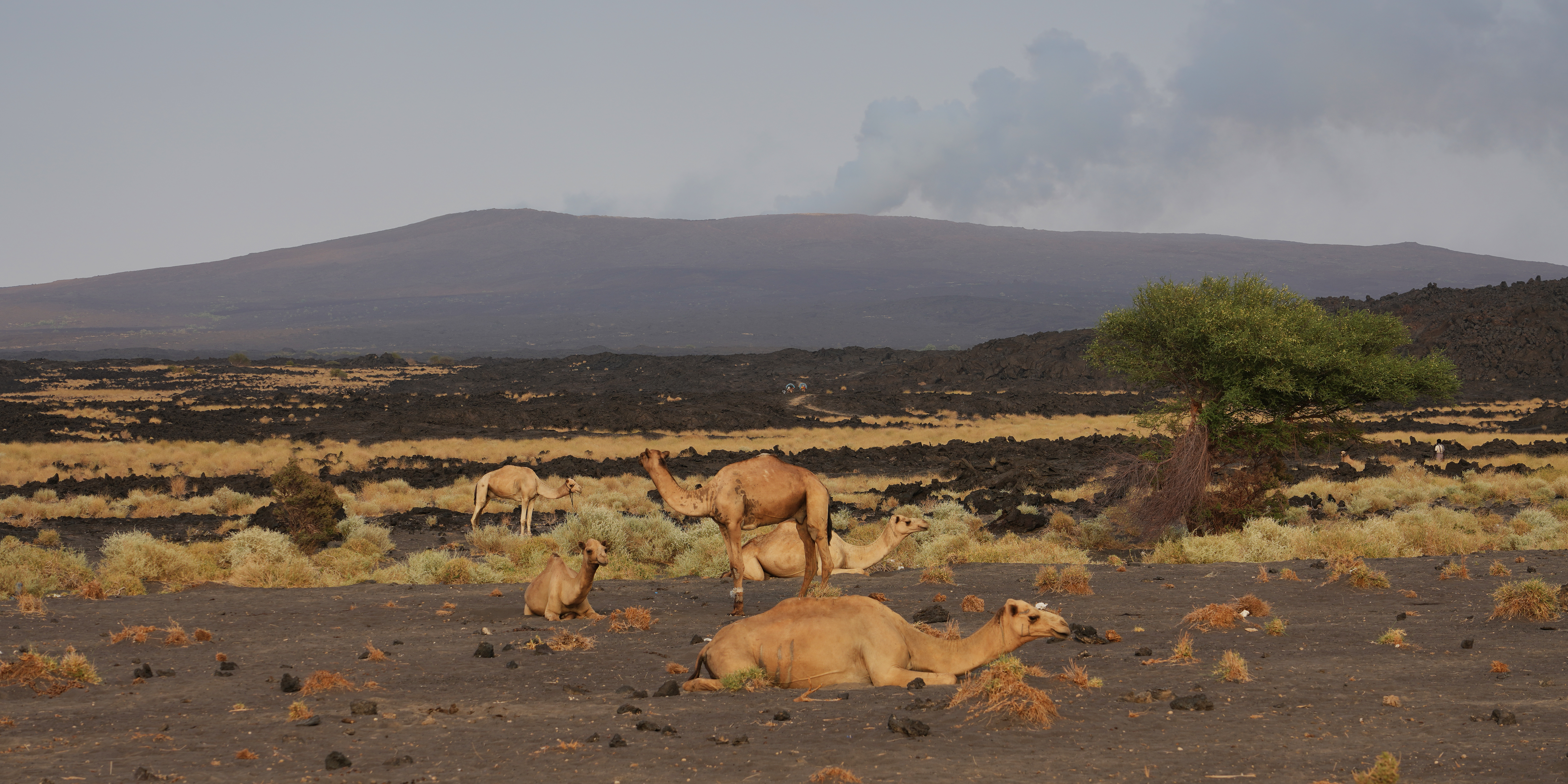
View of Erta Ale from the base camp

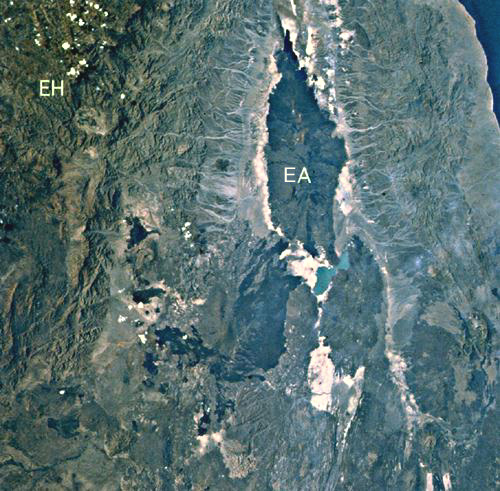
Erta Ale volcano (EA) and Ethiopian Highlands (EH) as seen from space

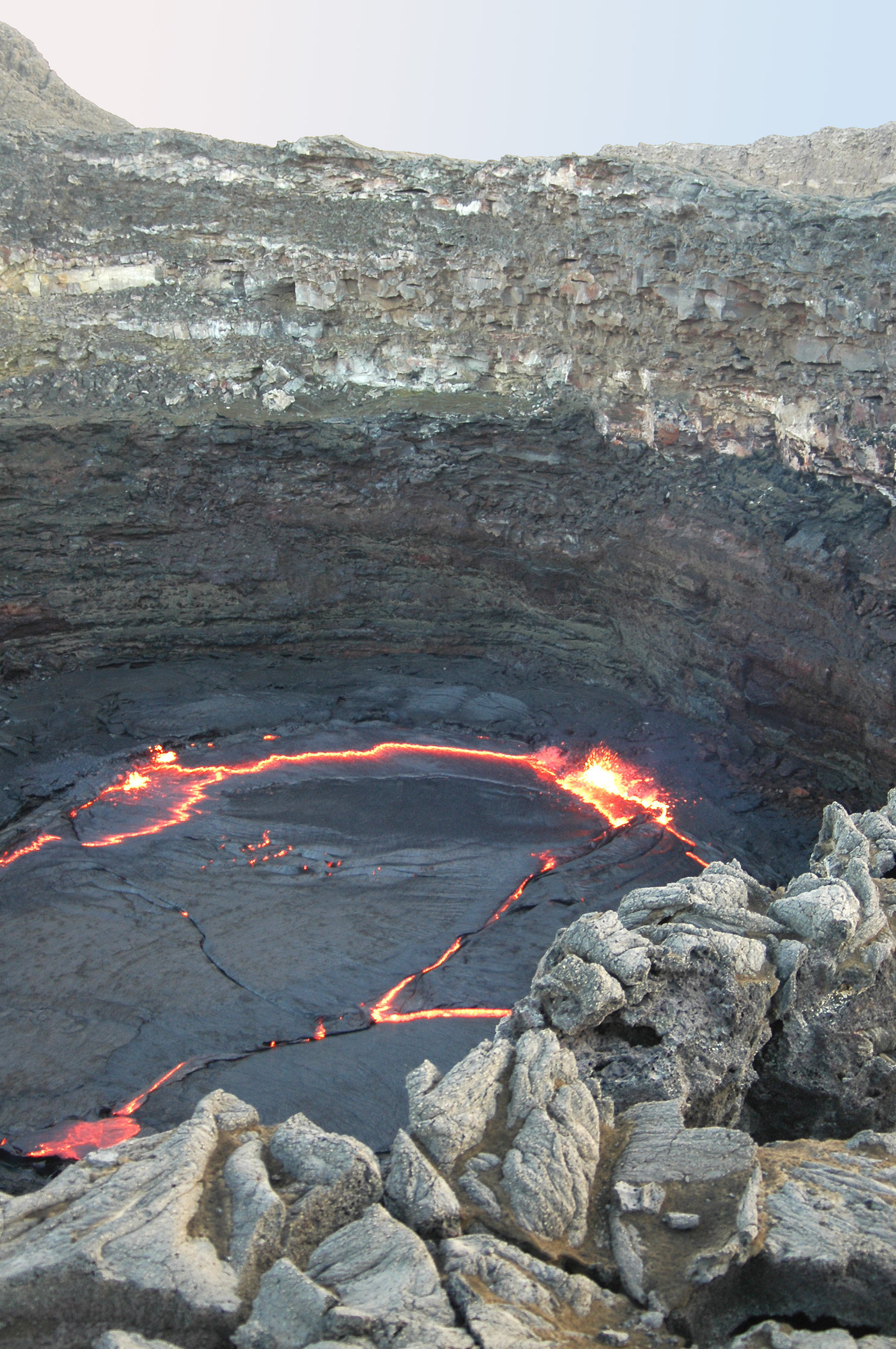
The lava lake in the caldera of Erta Ale

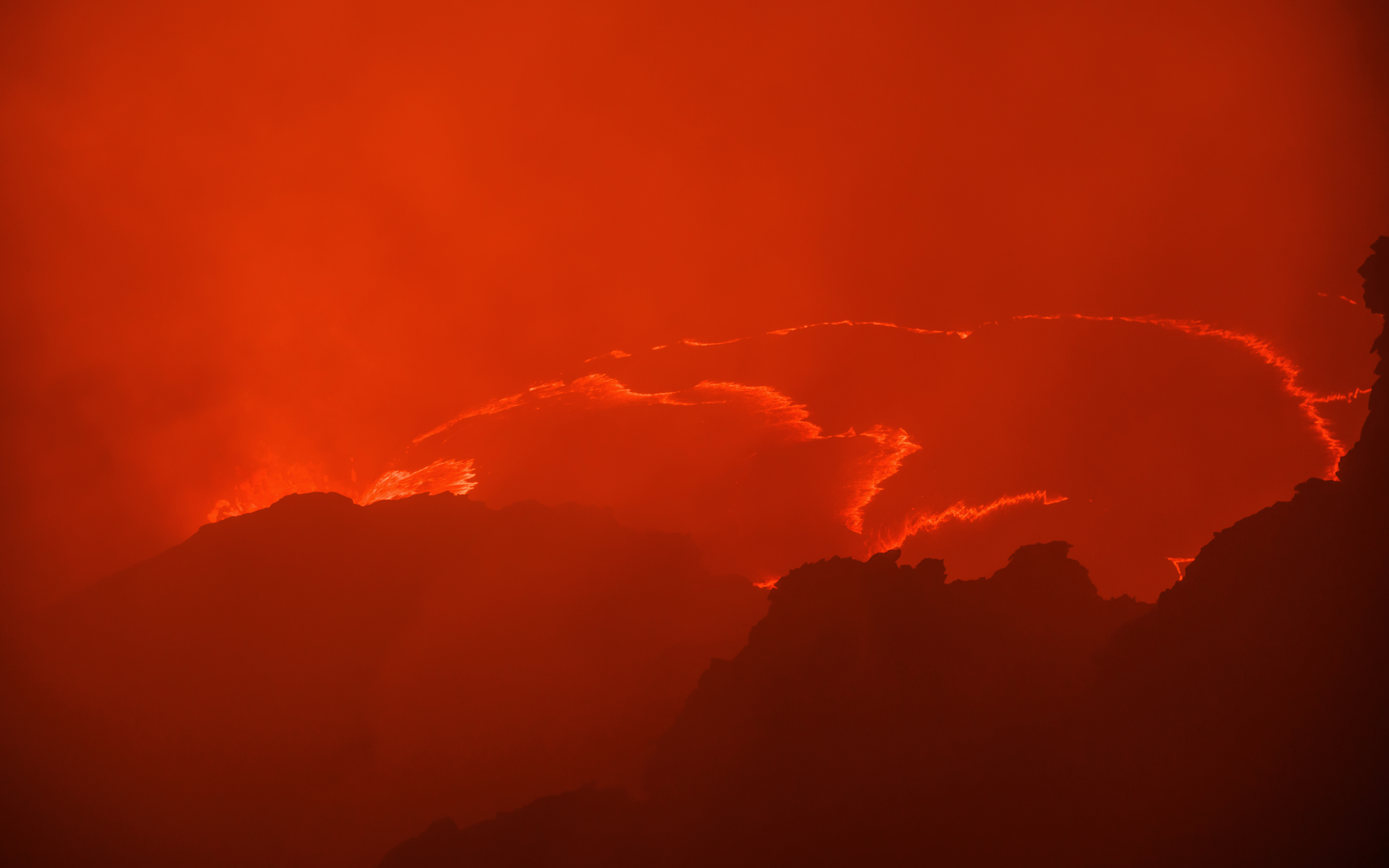
The lava lake's activity in January 2018

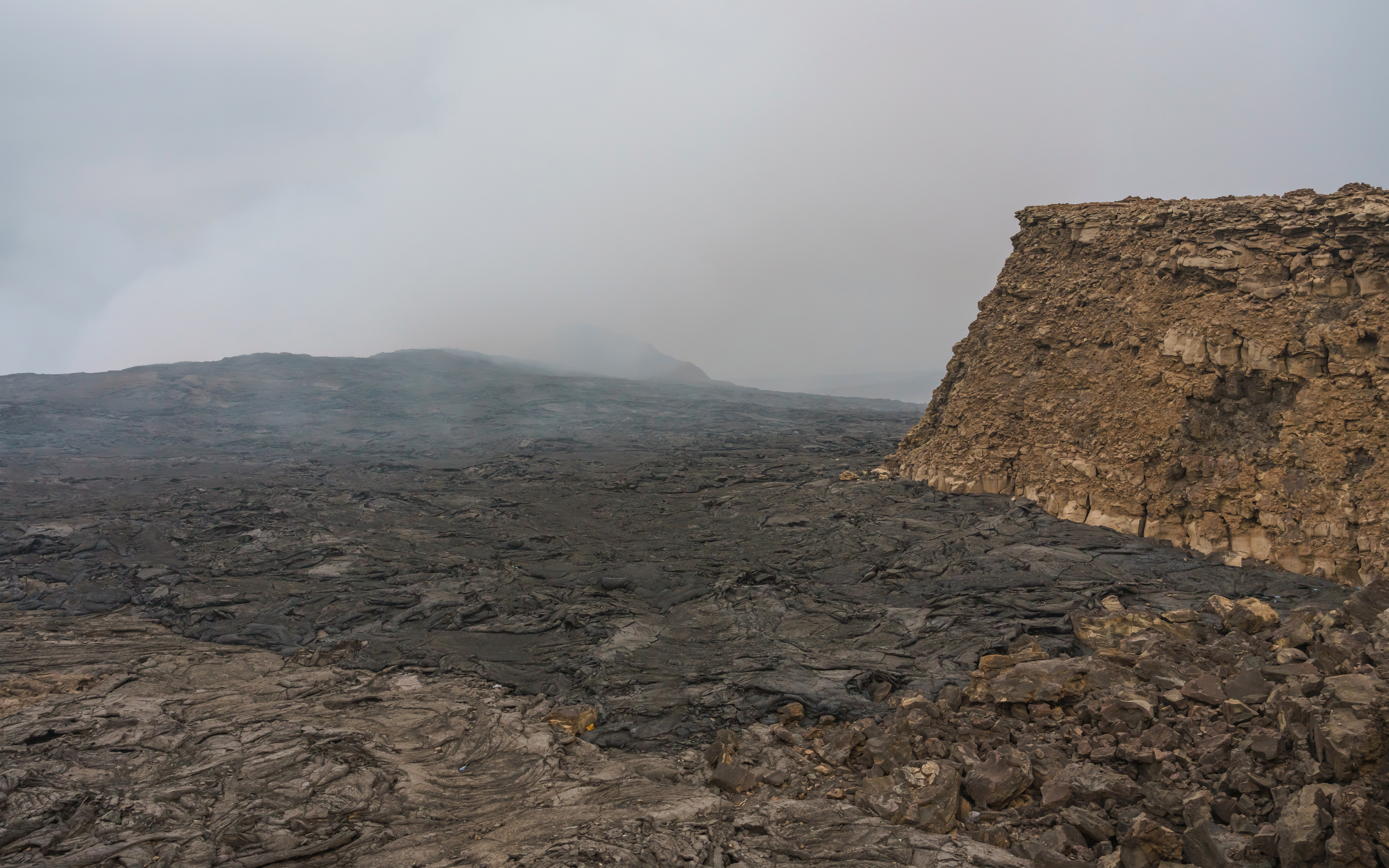
Dry lava field on the top

== Tourism ==
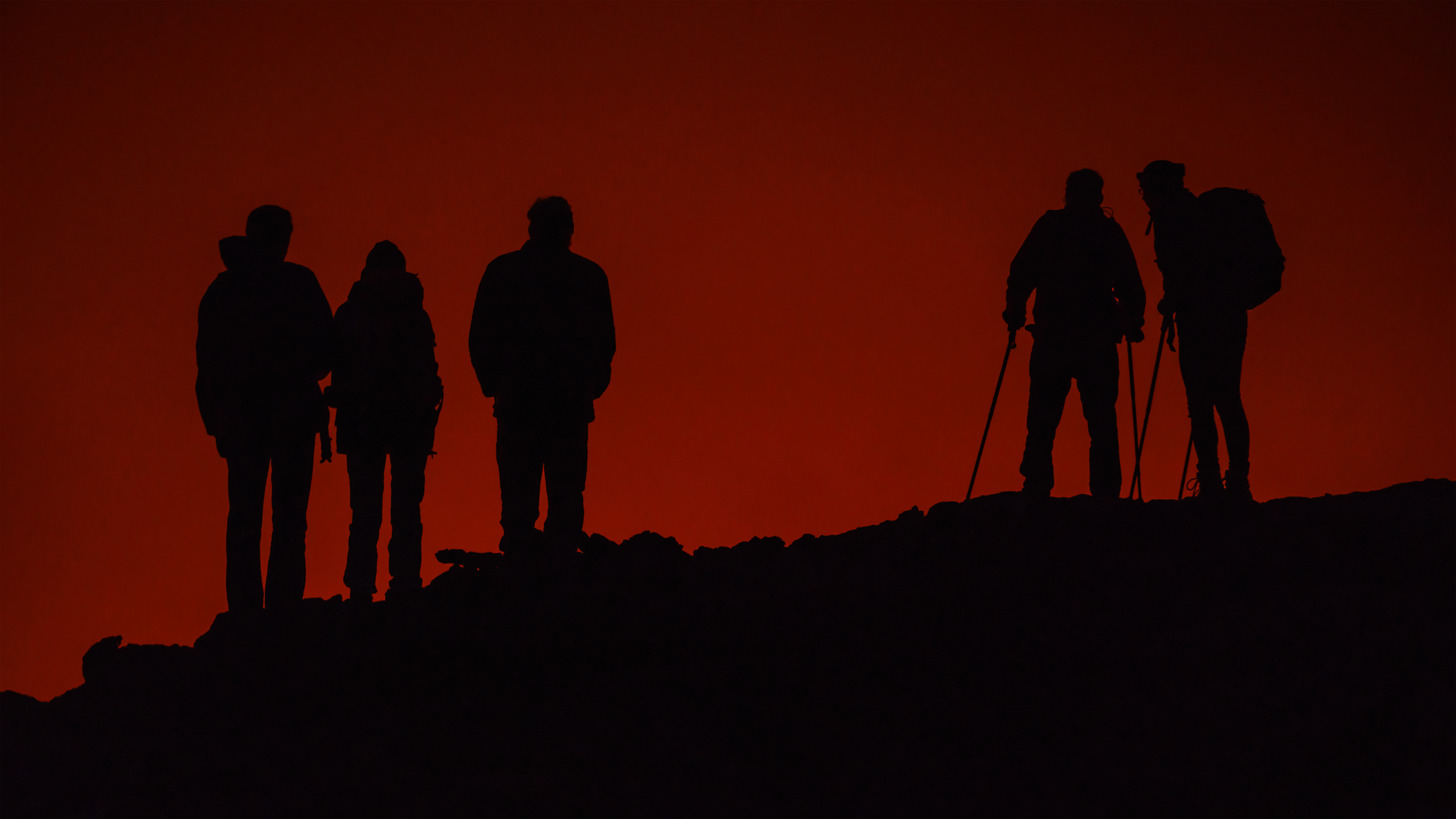
Tourists standing at the crater and watching the lava lake's activity

Erta Ale is the most regularly visited volcano in the Danakil Depression. However, not much is known about the volcano, and the surrounding terrain is some of the most inhospitable on Earth, making travel difficult and dangerous. The Afar region also experiences intermittent ethnic violence due to unification struggles by the native Afar people. On January 17, 2012, a group of European tourists was attacked at Erta Ale. Five tourists were killed, two taken as hostages and seven others wounded. The Afar Revolutionary Democratic Unity Front (ARDUF) claimed responsibility for the attack and released the two kidnapped tourists in March 2012. One travel guide recommends hiring "one or maybe two armed guards or police" as guides to visit Erta Ale. Commercial tour companies offer tours to Erta Ale which are generally accompanied by military escort.

In December 2017, a German tourist was fatally shot while descending Erta Ale.

== In popular culture ==
Erta Ale was featured in the episode "Volcano" of the 2008 documentary series Earth: The Biography. The lava lake on Erta Ale was shown briefly during the 2010 movie Clash of the Titans during the journey sequence where Perseus travels to the underworld. Erta Ale is featured in the 2016 Werner Herzog documentary Into the Inferno.

== See also ==
- Erta Ale Range
- Geography of Ethiopia
- List of volcanoes in Ethiopia
