= Geography of Kenya =

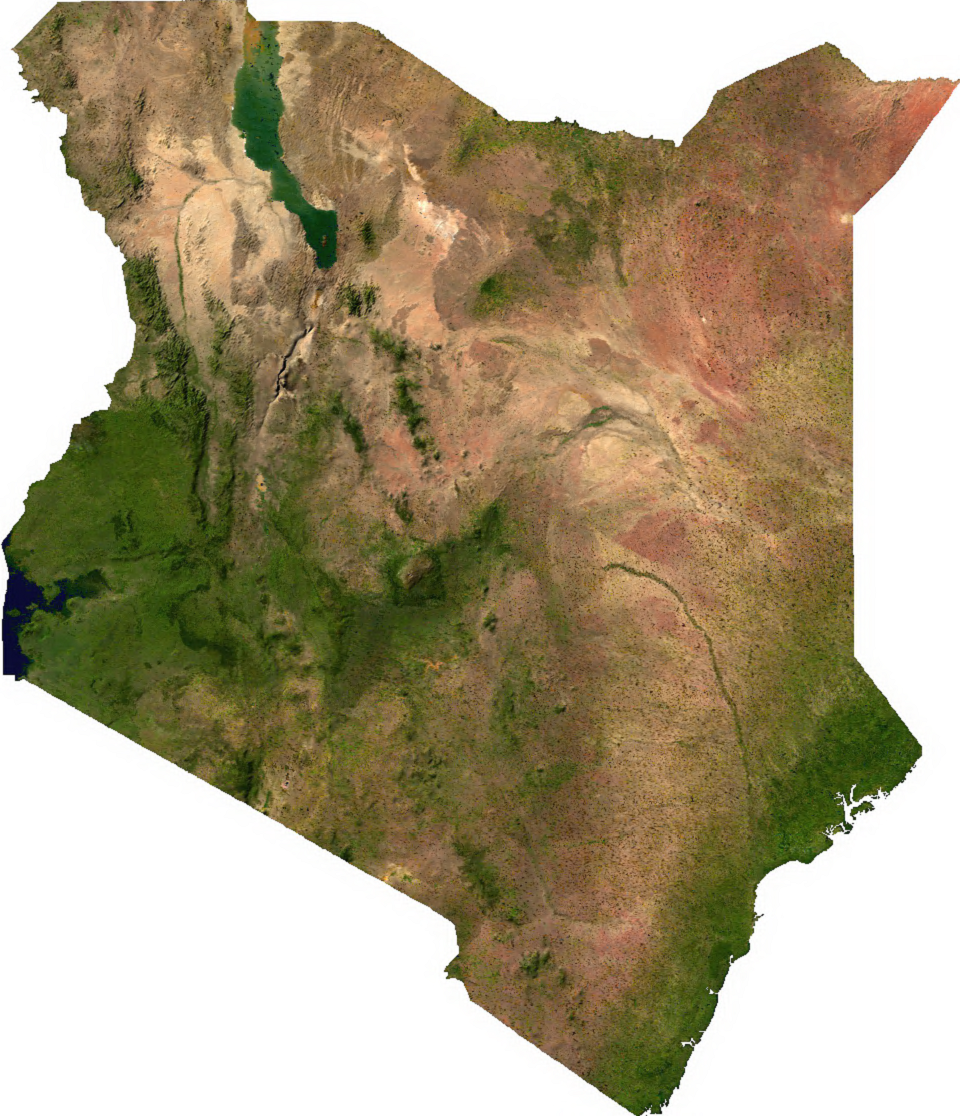
- Continent: Africa
- Region: East Africa
- Coordinates: 1°00′N 38°00′E
- Area: Ranked 48th
  - Total: 580,367 km^{2} (224,081 sq mi)
  - Land: 98.07%
  - Water: 1.93%
- Coastline: 536 km (333 mi)
- Borders: 3,446 km (2,141 mi)
- Highest point: Mount Kenya; 5,197 metres (17,051 ft)
- Lowest point: Indian Ocean; 0 metres (0 ft)
- Longest river: Tana River (Kenya) (wholly within Kenya); 800 km (500 mi)
- Largest lake: Lake Turkana; 6,405 km^{2} (2,473 mi^{2})
- Exclusive economic zone: 116,942 km^{2} (45,152 mi^{2})

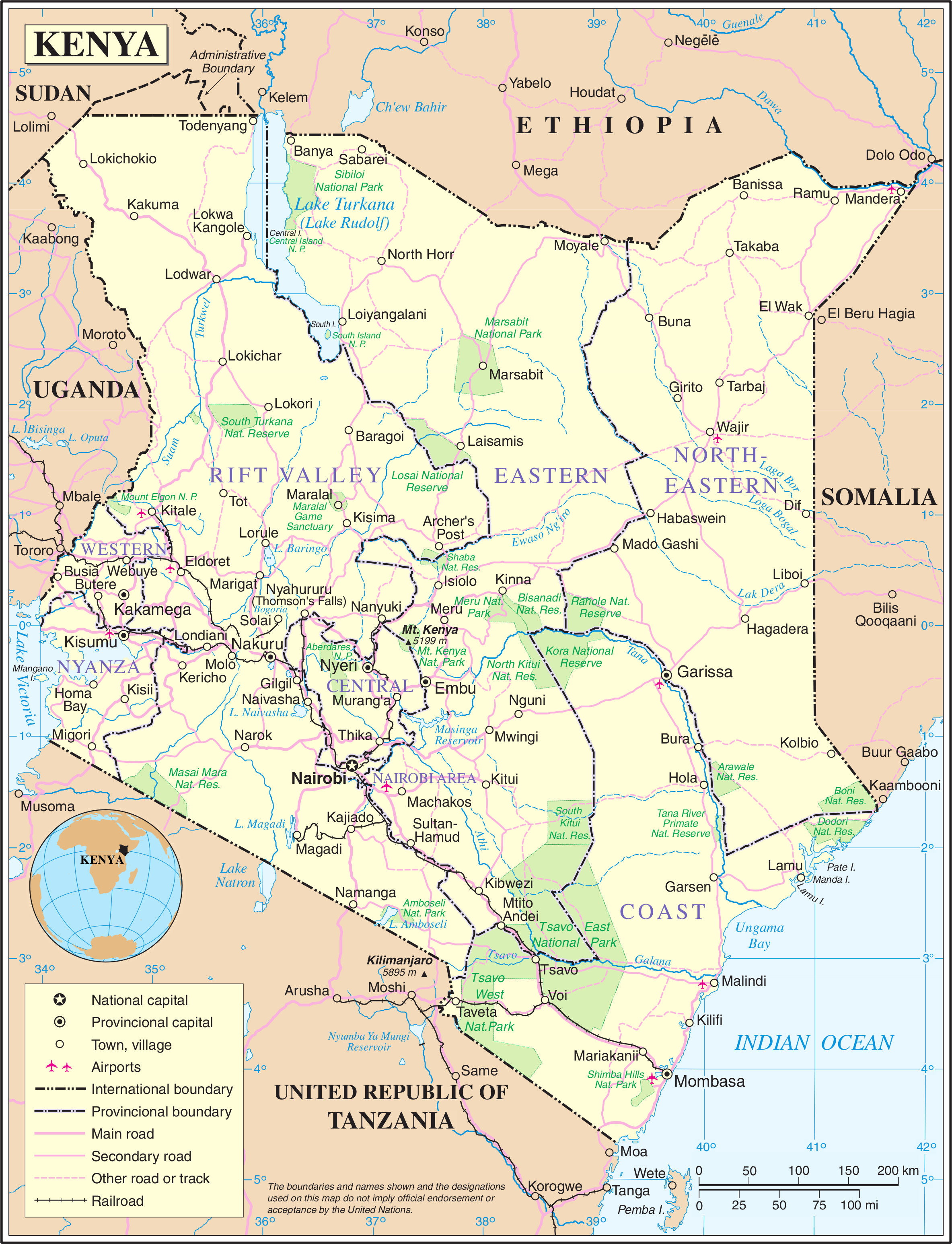
A United Nations map of Kenya

Location of Kenya

The Geography of Kenya is diverse, varying amongst its 47 counties. Kenya has a coastline on the Indian Ocean, which contains swamps of East African mangroves. Inland are broad plains and numerous hills. Kenya borders South Sudan to the northwest, Uganda to the west, Somalia to the east, Tanzania to the south, and Ethiopia to the north. Kenya currently faces border disputes with South Sudan over the Ilemi Triangle and with Somalia over Jubbaland which, if the Somali Government gives it up, could be a new part of Kenya and would bring the total land area of Kenya to approximately 692,939 km^{2}.

Central and Western Kenya is characterized by the Kenyan Rift Valley and central Province home to the highest mountain, Mount Kenya and Mount Elgon on the border between Kenya and Uganda. The Kakamega Forest in western Kenya is a relic of an East African rainforest. Much bigger is Mau Forest, the largest forest complex in East Africa.

== Location ==
- Eastern Africa on the Indian Ocean coast between Somalia and Tanzania
- Geographic coordinates: 1°00′N 38°00′E

== Area ==
- Total: 582,650.2 km^{2} (224,962.5 sq mi)
- Land: 569,140 km^{2} (219,750 sq mi)
- Water: 11,227 km^{2} (4,335 sq mi)

Area comparative
- Australia comparative: approximately 5/7 the size of New South Wales
- Canada comparative: slightly smaller than Saskatchewan
- United Kingdom comparative: approximately 2 1/2 times the size of the United Kingdom
- United States comparative: approximately twice the size of Arizona
- EU comparative: slightly less than twice the size of Italy

== Land boundaries ==
- Total: 3,457 km (2,148 mi)
- Border countries: Ethiopia 867 km (539 mi), Somalia 684 km (425 mi), South Sudan 317 km (197 mi), Tanzania 775 km (482 mi), Uganda 814 km (506 mi)

== Coastline ==
- 536 km (333 mi) along the Indian Ocean.

=== Maritime claims ===
- Territorial sea: 12 nmi (22.2 km; 13.8 mi)
- Exclusive economic zone: 116,942 km^{2} (45,152 mi^{2}) and 200 nmi (370.4 km; 230.2 mi)
- Continental shelf: 200 m depth or to the depth of exploitation

== Geology ==
Much of the western two-thirds of the country consists of the Pliocene–Pleistocene volcanics deposited on Precambrian basement rocks. The southeast corner of the country is underlain by sediments of the Karoo System of Permian to Late Triassic age and a strip of Jurassic age sediments along the coast in the Mombasa area. The Anza trough is a NW–SE trending Jurassic rift extending from the Indian Ocean coast to the Sudan northwest of Lake Turkana. The Anza Rift resulted from the break–up of Gondwana.

== Climate ==
Köppen climate classification map of Kenya

The climate of Kenya varies by location, from mostly cool every day, to always warm/hot by mid afternoon. The climate along the coast is tropical. This means rainfall and temperatures are higher than inland throughout the year. At the coastal cities, Mombasa, Lamu and Malindi, the air temperature changes from cool to hot, almost every day. (See chart below).

The further inland one is in Kenya, the more arid the climate becomes. An extremely arid climate is nearly devoid of rainfall, and temperature varies widely according to the general time of the day/night. For many areas of Kenya, the daytime temperature rises about 12 °C (corresponding to a rise of about 22 °F), almost every day.

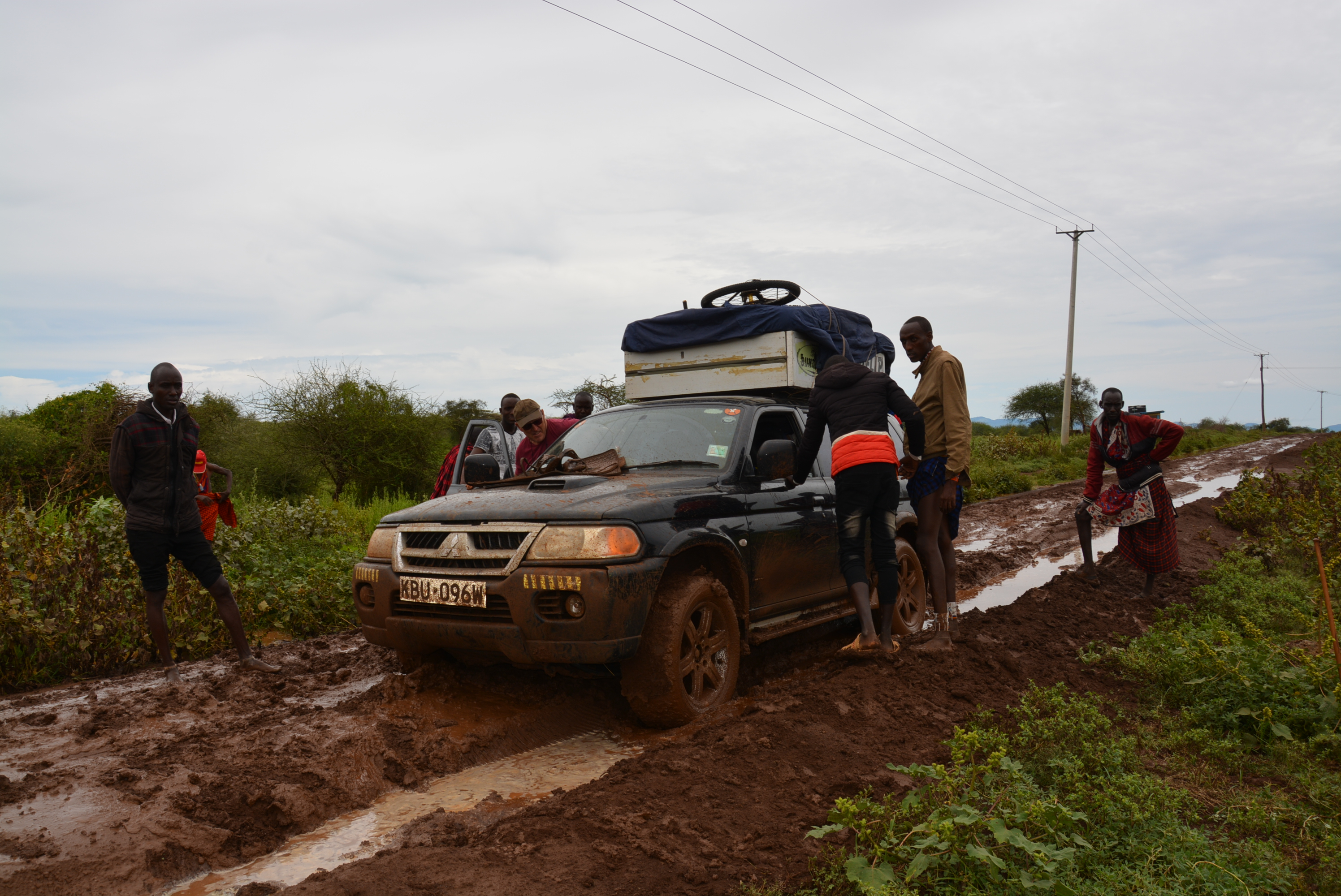
Transportation problems during the rainy season (March 2020)

Elevation is the major factor in temperature levels, with the higher areas, on average, about 11 °C (20 °F) cooler, day or night. The many cities over a kilometre in elevation have temperature swings from roughly 10–26 °C (50–79 °F). Nairobi, at 1,798 m (5,899 ft), ranges from 9–27 °C (49–80 °F), and Kitale, at 1,825 m (5,988 ft), ranges from 11–28 °C (51–82 °F). At night, heavy clothes or blankets are needed, in the highlands, when the temperature drops to about 10–12 °C (50–54 °F) every night.

At lower altitudes, the increased temperature is like day and night, literally: like starting the morning at the highland daytime high, and then adding the heat of the day, again. Hence, the overnight low temperatures near sea level are nearly the same as the high temperatures of the elevated Kenyan highlands. However, locations along the Indian Ocean have more moderate temperatures, as a few degrees cooler in the daytime, such as at Mombasa (see chart below).

There are slight seasonal variations in temperature, of 4 °C or 7.2 °F, cooler in the winter months. Although Kenya is centred at the equator, it shares the seasons of the Southern Hemisphere: with the warmest summer months in December–March and the coolest winter months in June–August, again with differences in temperature varying by location within the country.

On the high mountains, such as Mount Kenya, Mount Elgon and Kilimanjaro, the weather can become bitterly cold for most of the year. Some snowfall occurs on the highest mountains.

Climate data for Mombasa (at Indian Ocean)
NOAA Code	Statistic	Jan	Feb	Mar	Apr	May	Jun	Jul	Aug	Sep	Oct	Nov	Dec	Avg
0101	Temperature; Average F	81.7	82.6	82.9	81.7	79.2	76.6	75.2	75.2	76.5	78.3	80.4	81.3	79.3
0201	Temperature; High value F	91.8	92.7	92.7	90.5	87.6	84.9	83.7	83.8	85.5	86.9	88.9	91	88.3
0301	Temperature; Low value F	71.6	72.5	73.2	72.9	70.9	68.2	66.7	66.7	67.5	69.6	71.8	71.6	70.3
0615	Precipitation in inches	1.4	0.6	2.3	6.3	9.7	3.6	2.9	2.8	2.8	4.2	4.3	3.1	3.7
0101	Temperature; Average C	27.6	28.1	28.3	27.6	26.2	24.8	24.0	24.0	24.7	25.7	26.9	27.4	26.27
0201	Temperature; High value C	33.2	33.7	33.7	32.5	30.9	29.4	28.7	28.8	29.7	30.5	31.6	32.8	31.29
0301	Temperature; Low value C	22.0	22.5	22.9	22.7	21.6	20.1	19.3	19.3	19.7	20.9	22.1	22.0	21.26
0615	Precipitation in mm	33.9	14.0	55.6	154.3	246	88.3	71.8	68.2	67.2	103.4	104.7	75.8	89.39
1109	Humidity; Maximum %	76.0	76.0	78.0	82.0	85.0	84.0	86.0	85.0	82.0	81.0	80.0	78.0	81.08
1110	Humidity; Minimum %	62.0	59.0	61.0	66.0	70.0	67.0	67.0	66.0	65.0	66.0	68.0	65.0	65.17

=== Climate change ===
Köppen climate classification map for Kenya for 1980–2016

2071–2100 map under the most intense climate change scenario. Mid-range scenarios are currently considered more likely.

Climate change is posing an increasing threat to global socioeconomic development and environmental sustainability. Developing countries with low adaptive capacity and high vulnerability to the phenomenon are disproportionately affected. Climate change in Kenya is increasingly impacting the lives of Kenya's citizens and the environment. Climate change has led to more frequent extreme weather events like droughts which last longer than usual, irregular and unpredictable rainfall, flooding and increasing temperatures.

The annual fossil fuel carbon dioxide emissions, in million metric tons of carbon, for a variety of non-overlapping regions covering the Earth

== Terrain ==
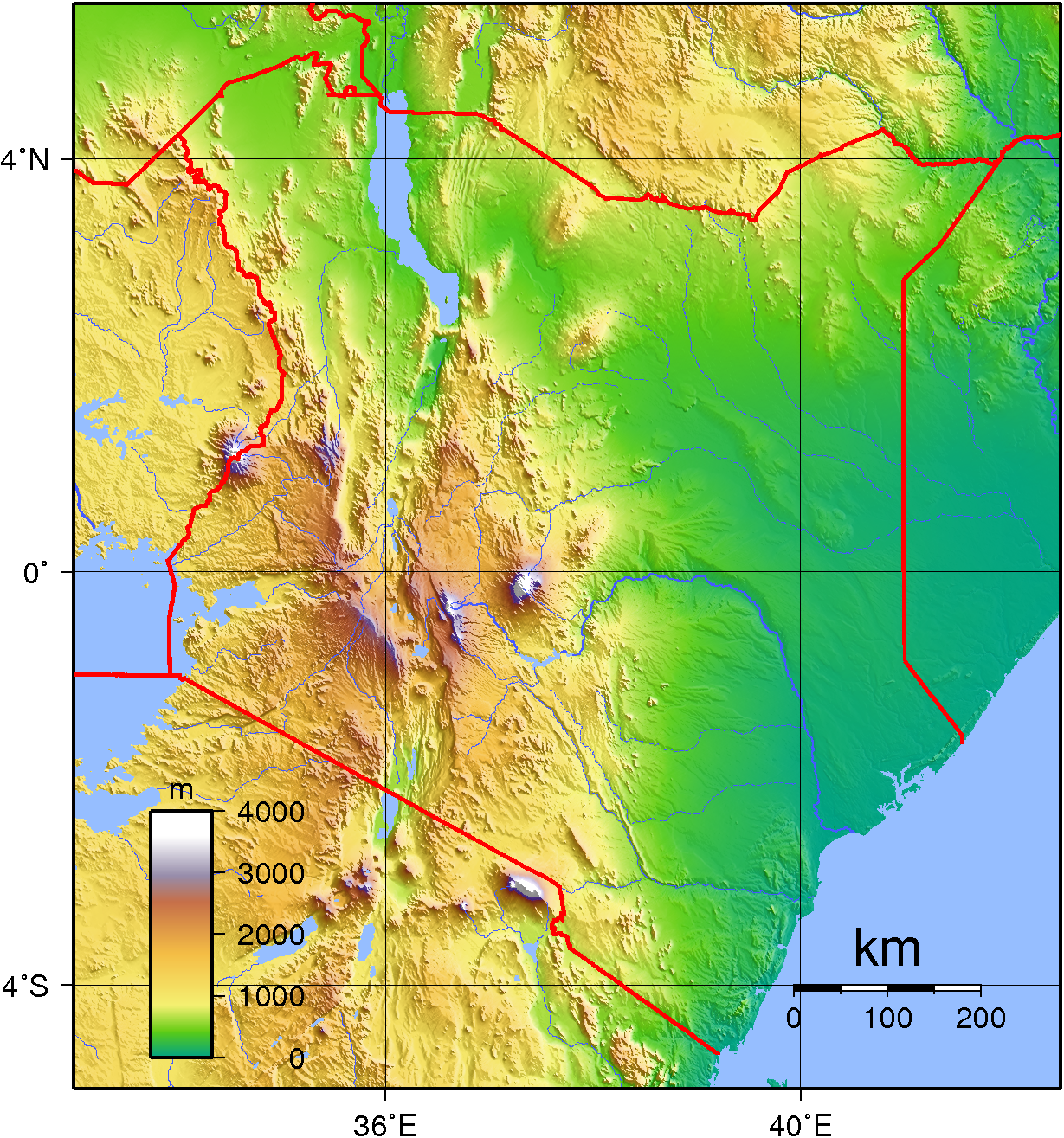
The topography of Kenya.

Kenya's terrain is composed of low plains that rise into central highlands that are, in turn, bisected by the Great Rift Valley. There is also a fertile plateau in the west of the country.

=== Elevation extremes ===
The lowest point on Kenya is at sea level on the Indian Ocean. The highest point on Kenya is 5,199 meters above sea level at Mount Kenya.

=== Rivers ===
The notable rivers in Kenya are the Athi-Galana-Sabaki River, which at a total length of about 390 kilometers while draining an area of about 70,000 square kilometers, is the second longest river in the country, the Tana River, the longest river in the country at a total length of just over 1000 kilometers, covering a catchment area of over 100,000 square kilometers, and the Nzoia River, which is a 257-kilometre-long (160 mi) river, rising from Mount Elgon, which flows south.

=== Natural resources ===
Natural resources that are found in Kenya include: limestone, soda ash, salt, gemstones, fluorite, zinc, diatomite, oil, titanium, gas, gold, gypsum, wildlife and hydropower.

=== Land use ===
9.8% of the land is arable; permanent crops occupy 0.9% of the land, permanent pasture occupies 37.4% of the land; forest occupies 6.1% of the land. Other uses make up the rest of Kenya's land. This is as of 2011.

1,032 km^{2} of Kenyan land was irrigated in 2003.

=== Total renewable water resources ===
30.7 km^{3} (2011)

=== Freshwater withdrawal ===
- Total: 2.74 km^{3}/yr (17%/4%/79%)
- Per capita: 72.96 m^{3}/yr (2003)

=== Gallery ===
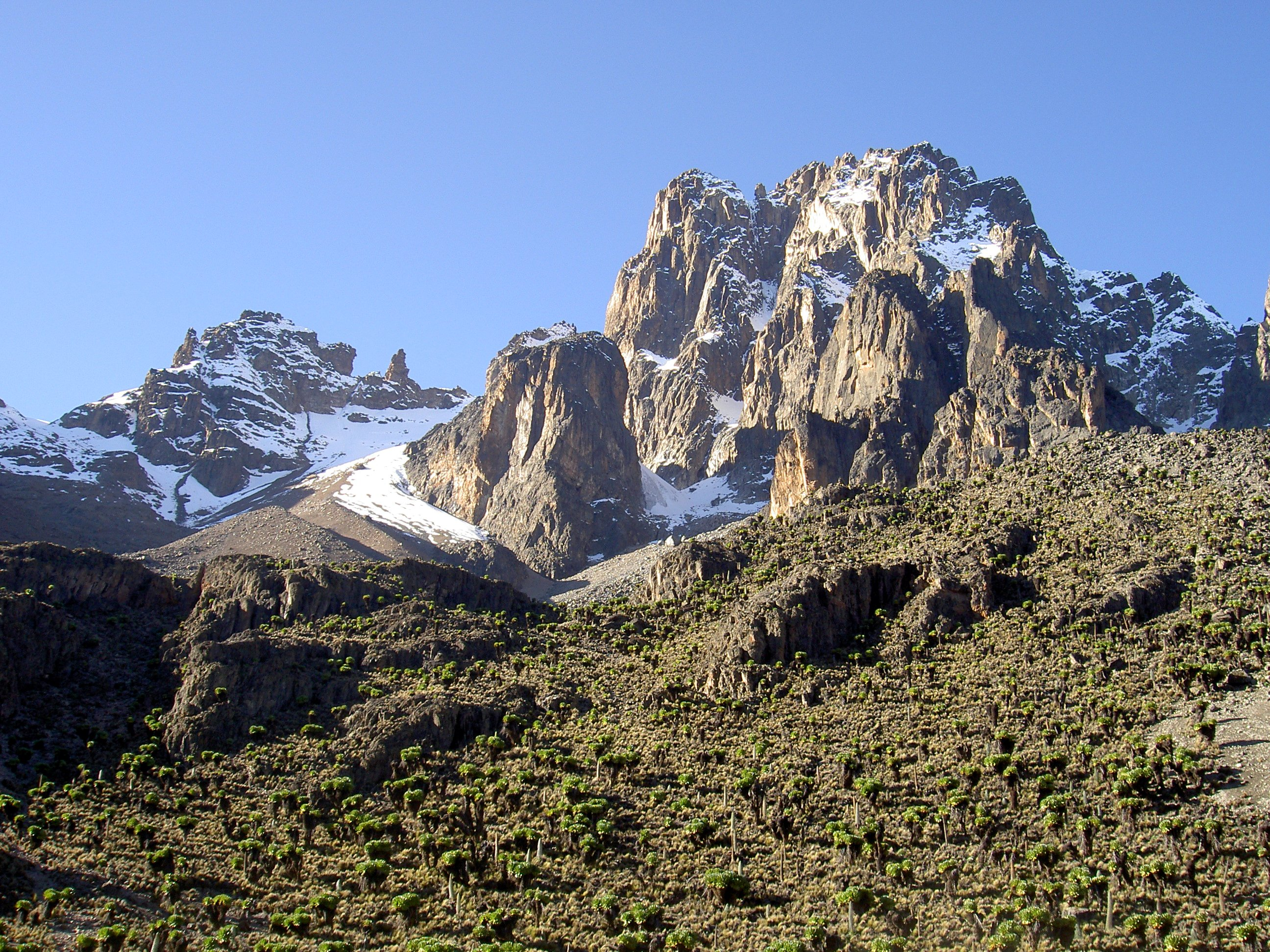
Lenana (4955 m), Batian (5199 m) and Nelion (5188 m) on Mt Kenya

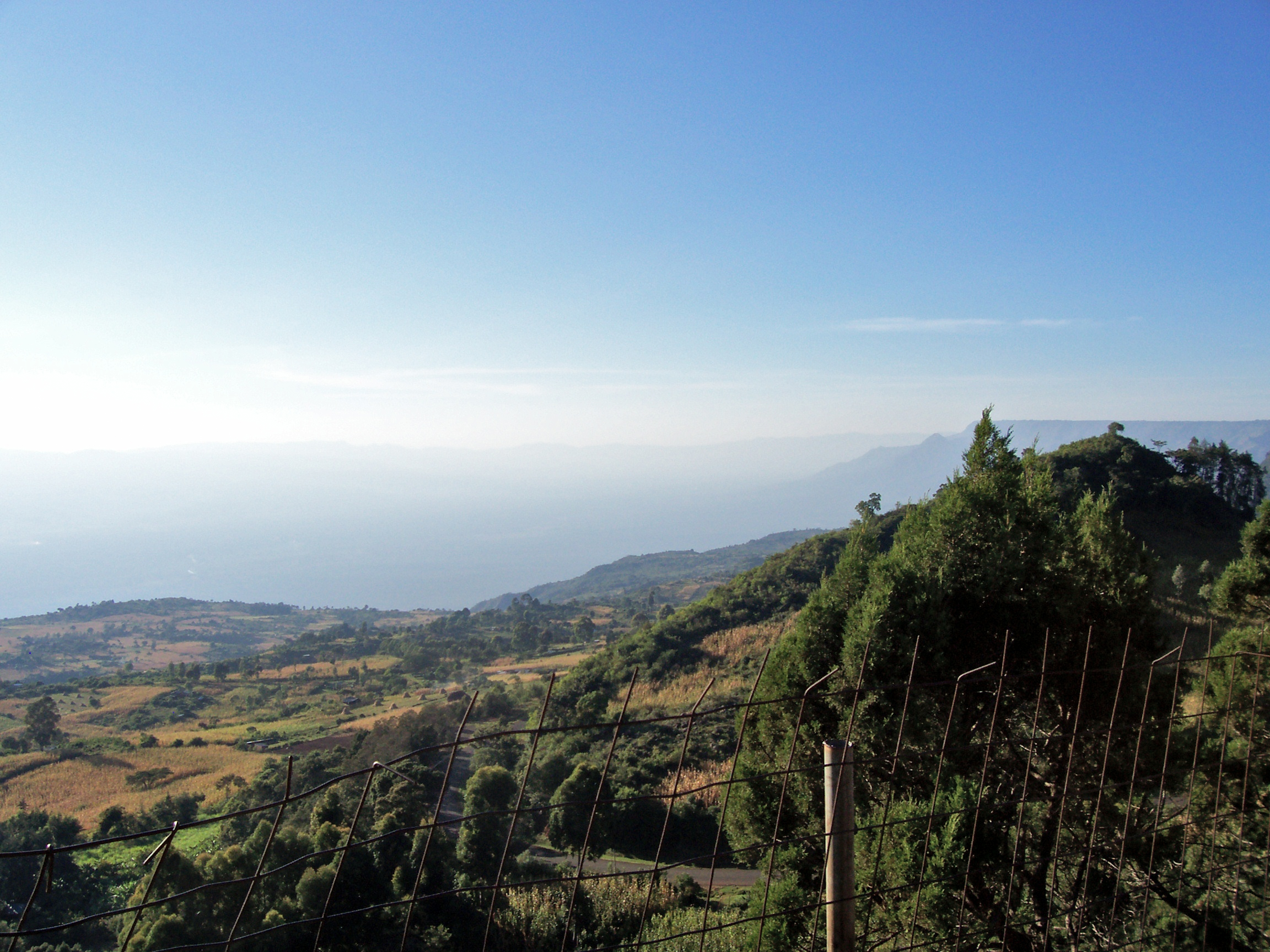
The Great Rift Valley as it is visible near Eldoret, Kenya

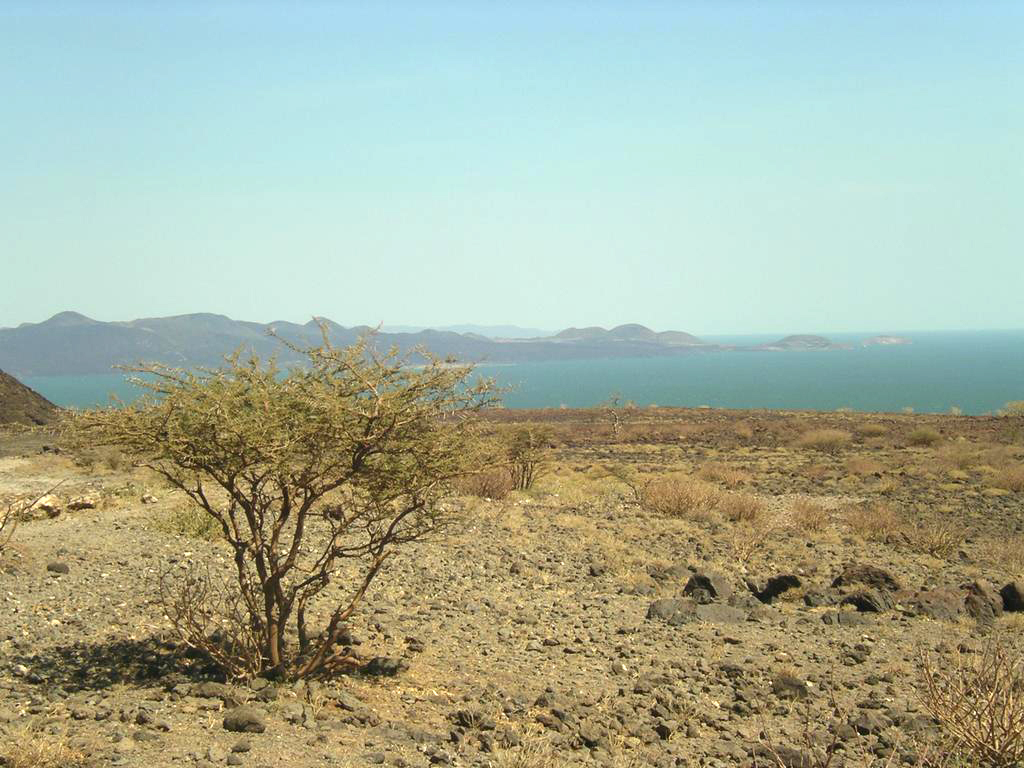
Lake Turkana

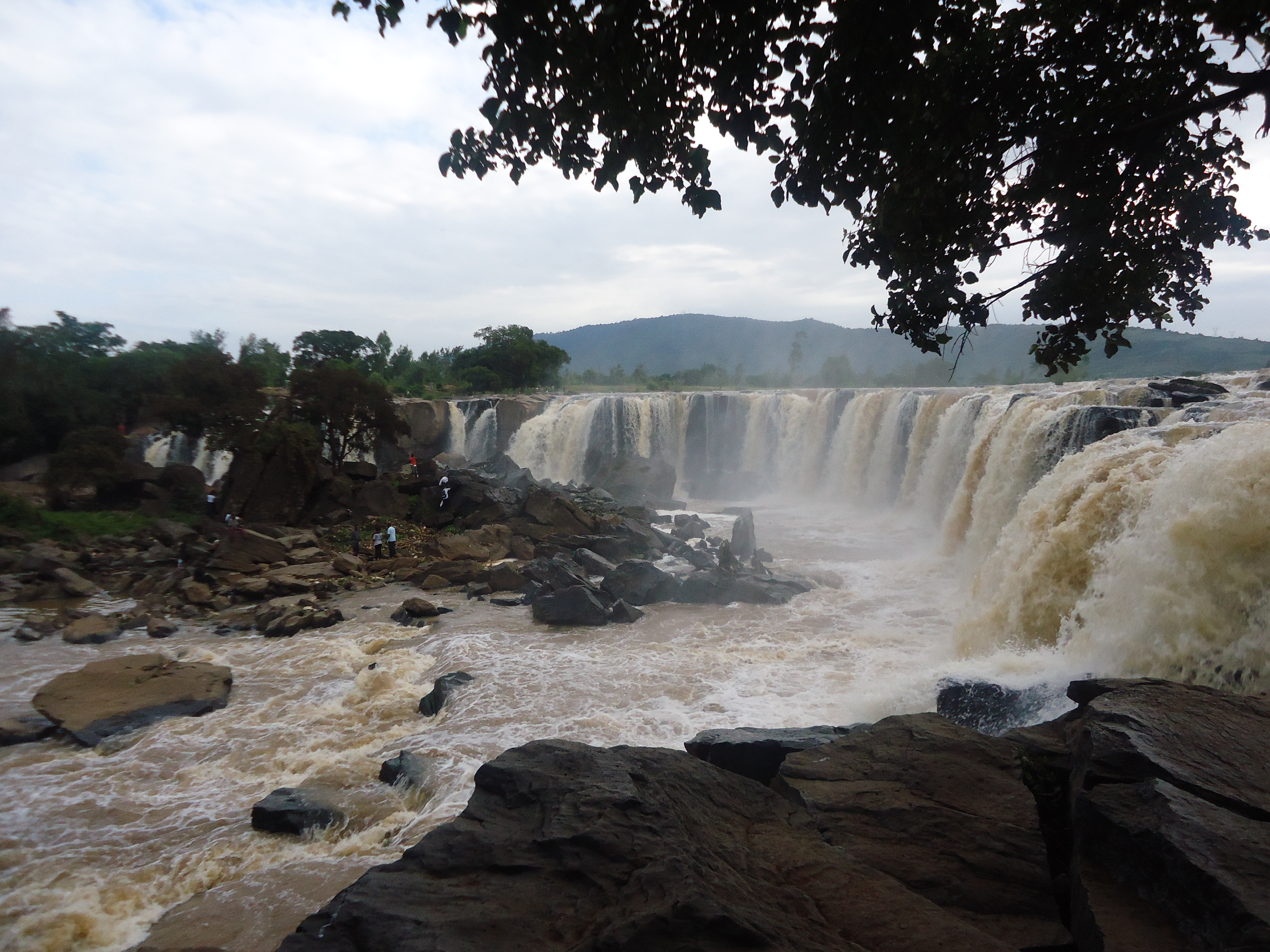
The Fourteen Falls near Thika

== Natural hazards ==
Natural hazards include recurring drought and flooding during the rainy seasons.

There is limited volcanic activity in the country. Barrier Volcano (elev. 1,032 m) last erupted in 1921. Several others have been historically active (see List of volcanoes in Kenya).

=== Environmental issues ===
==== Current issues ====
Current issues that threaten the environment at the moment include water pollution from urban and industrial wastes; degradation of water quality from the increased use of pesticides and fertilisers; deforestation; water hyacinth infestation in Lake Victoria; soil erosion; desertification; and poaching.

==== International agreements ====
- Party to: Biodiversity, Climate Change, Climate Change-Kyoto Protocol, Desertification, Endangered Species, Hazardous Wastes, Law of the Sea, Marine Dumping, Marine Life Conservation, Ozone Layer Protection, Ship Pollution (MARPOL 73/78), Wetlands, Whaling.

== Extreme points ==
This is a list of the extreme points of Kenya, the points that are further north, south, east or west than any other location.

- Northernmost point – Kalukwakerith Mountain, Turkana County
- Easternmost point – the tripoint with Ethiopia and Somalia, Mandera County
- Southernmost point – the point where the border with Tanzania enters the Indian Ocean, Kwale County
- Westernmost point – unnamed land west of Port Victoria, Busia County
  - Note: Kalukwakerith Mountain is in the disputed Ilemi Triangle region. If this area is excluded then Kenya does not have a northernmost point, the northern border being a straight line.

== See also ==
- Environmental issues in Kenya
- List of national parks of Kenya
- Ilemi Triangle
- Mandera triangle
