= Mandera triangle =

Coordinates: 3°55′N 41°50′E

The Mandera triangle is a geographical region in Eastern Africa where the countries of Ethiopia, Kenya and Somalia meet. The tri-border region is centered on the city of Mandera in Mandera County and corresponds with the Juba and Shabelle river basins.

The residents of the area are mainly ethnic Somalis. Pastoralists routinely move across the various borders while seeking water and pasture for their herds. Experiencing large-scale violence as a result of the civil strife in Somalia, engagements between the Ethiopian military and Somali insurgents, inter-clan warfare, livestock raids between rival herders, targeted attacks, and frequent banditry, the United States Department of State has labeled the area "one of the most conflict-prone areas in the world". It has been reported that weapons shipments from Yemen arrive in Somalia, then make their way across the Mandera triangle prior to being moved across the rest of the African continent.

== See also ==
- Geography of Ethiopia
- Geography of Kenya
- Geography of Somalia
- Ilemi Triangle
