= Climate of Ethiopia =

The Climate of Ethiopia is highly diverse, ranging from equatorial rainforest with high rainfall and humidity in the south and southwest, to Afromontane regions on the summits of Semien and Bale Mountains to desert region in northeast, east and southeast Ethiopia. Ethiopia’s climate is traditionally divided into five distinct zones, based on altitude and temperature: Bereha (hot arid), Kolla (warm semi-arid), Dega (cool and humid), Weyna Dega (cool sub-humid), and Wurch (cool and moist).

Köppen climate classification of Ethiopia

Ethiopian seasons are classified into three: the driest season is called Bega (October to January), Belg (February to May) and the rainy season Kiremt (June to September). This seasonal rainfall is impacted by the oscillation and migration of the Intertropical Convergence Zone (ITCZ) across the equator of northern region of the country in July and August, to its south bending its position over the southern Kenya in January and February.

Climate change is of great concern in Ethiopia, especially since the 1970s. Between the mid-1970s and late 2000s, Ethiopia's rainfall in some areas and seasons decreased by 15-20 percent. Furthermore, numerous studies predict climate change will increasingly affect the country's ecosystem, causing drought and famines. The government of Ethiopia has initiated a green economy policy to counter climate change and foster economic development such as the 2011 Climate Resilient Green Economy (CRGE).

== Features ==
Ethiopia features diverse climates and landscapes, ranging from equatorial rainforest with high rainfall and humidity in the south and southwest, to the Afro-Alpine summits of the Semien and Bale Mountains, to desert like conditions in the northeast, east and southeast lowlands. The country is generally divided into three zones, the Alpine vegetated cool zones, also known as Dega, with areas over 2,600 meters above sea level; temperate zones known as Woyna Dega, where much of the country's population concentrated in areas between 1,500 and 2,500 meters above sea level where temperatures range between 16°C and 30°C; and the hot zone known as Qola. Most of the highland regions like Lalibela and Gondar are at an elevation above 2,000m (6,561ft), enjoying a moderate climate year-round. Mean annual temperatures are around 15–20°C in these high-altitude regions, whilst 25–30°C in the lowlands.

== Seasons ==
Ethiopia has distinct types of season: the Bega (October to January), Belg (February to May) and Kiremt (June to September). The driest season is Bega, whereas the main rainy season is Kiremt. Rains typically begin in the south and central parts of the country during the Belg season, then spread northward, with central and northern Ethiopia receiving most of their precipitation during the Kiremt season.

Seasonal rainfall in Ethiopia occurs because of the migration of the intertropical Convergence Zone (ITCZ), which oscillates across the equator over the course of the year from its northern-most position over northern Ethiopia in July and August to the south, over southern Kenya, in January and February.

== Climate change effects ==
During the mid-1970s and the late 2000s, rainfall decreased during Belg and Kiremt seasons by 15–20% across parts of southern, southwestern, and southeastern Ethiopia. The area receiving sufficient rainfall for agriculture during the Belg season decreased by 16 percent in the twenty years up to 2012.

Ethiopia's climate is predicted to warm between 0.7°C and 2.3°C by the end of the 2020s and between 1.4°C and 2.9°C by the 2050s. The county's vulnerability to climate change could increase poverty and dependency on rain-fed agriculture. Other factors are environmental degradation (e.g., deforestation), chronic food security, and recurring natural droughts, that may contribute for shaping the effects of climate change in Ethiopia.

In response to experience, the Ethiopian government began developing a green economy policy to counter climate change under a single policy: the 2011 Climate Resilient Green Economy (CRGE) strategy. The strategy aimed to promote a green economy with economic development by curbing greenhouse gas emissions.

== See also ==
- Geography of Ethiopia
