= Ilemi Triangle =

Disputed territory between South Sudan and Kenya

- Disputed territory
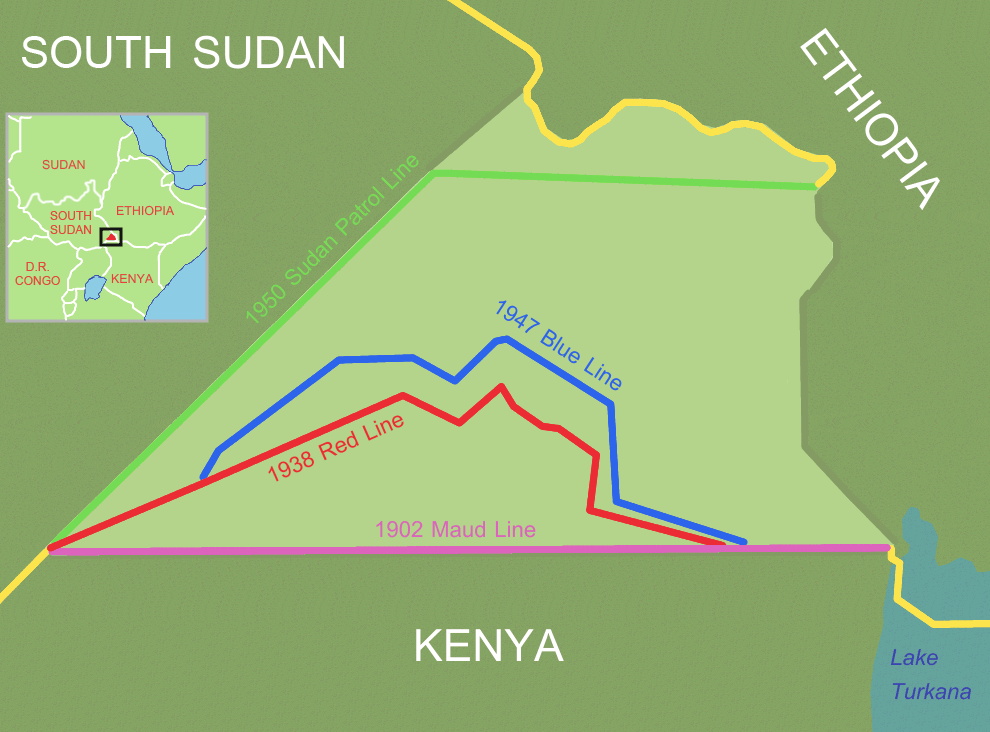
- Ilemi Triangle map
- Interactive map of Ilemi Triangle
- Coordinates: 04°59′29″N 35°19′38″E
- Country: De jure Disputed area between: Kenya; South Sudan De facto Administered by: Kenya
- Counties: Turkana County (Kenya)
- Counties: Kapoeta East County (South Sudan)

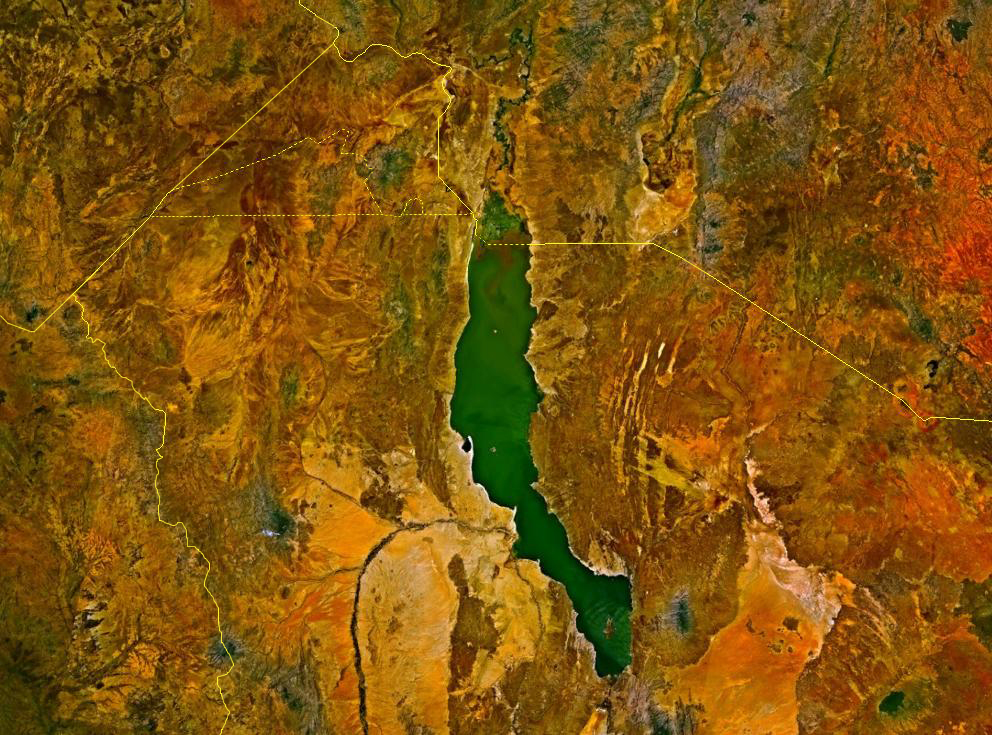
The Ilemi Triangle region is at the north-western corner of Lake Turkana.

The Ilemi Triangle, sometimes called only Ilemi, is a disputed area in East Africa, claimed by both Kenya and South Sudan. Arbitrarily defined, it measures about 11,000 square kilometres (4,200 sq mi). The territory also borders Ethiopia and, despite use and trespass into the triangle by border tribes from within Ethiopia, the Ethiopian government has not made any official claim on the area, instead agreeing that the land was Sudanese territory in the 1902, 1907, and 1972 treaties.

Kenya now has de facto control of all the territory in the Ilemi Triangle up to the northern 1950 Sudanese Patrol Line. The dispute arose from the 1914 treaty in which a straight parallel line was used to divide territories that were both part of the British Empire. However the Turkana people—nomadic herders—continued to move to and from the border and traditionally grazed in the area.

The perceived economic marginality of the land as well as decades of Sudanese conflicts are two factors that have delayed the resolution of the dispute.

== Peoples ==
The nomadic Toposa move in the territory between South Sudan and Kenya and have been vulnerable to attacks from surrounding peoples. The other peoples in this area are the Didinga in South Sudan and Turkana in Kenya, and the Nyangatom (Inyangatom) who move between South Sudan and Ethiopia, and the Dassanech who live east of the triangle in Ethiopia.

These pastoral people have historically engaged in raids on livestock. While in the past they used traditional weapons, from the late nineteenth century onwards the use of firearms has been common.

== History ==
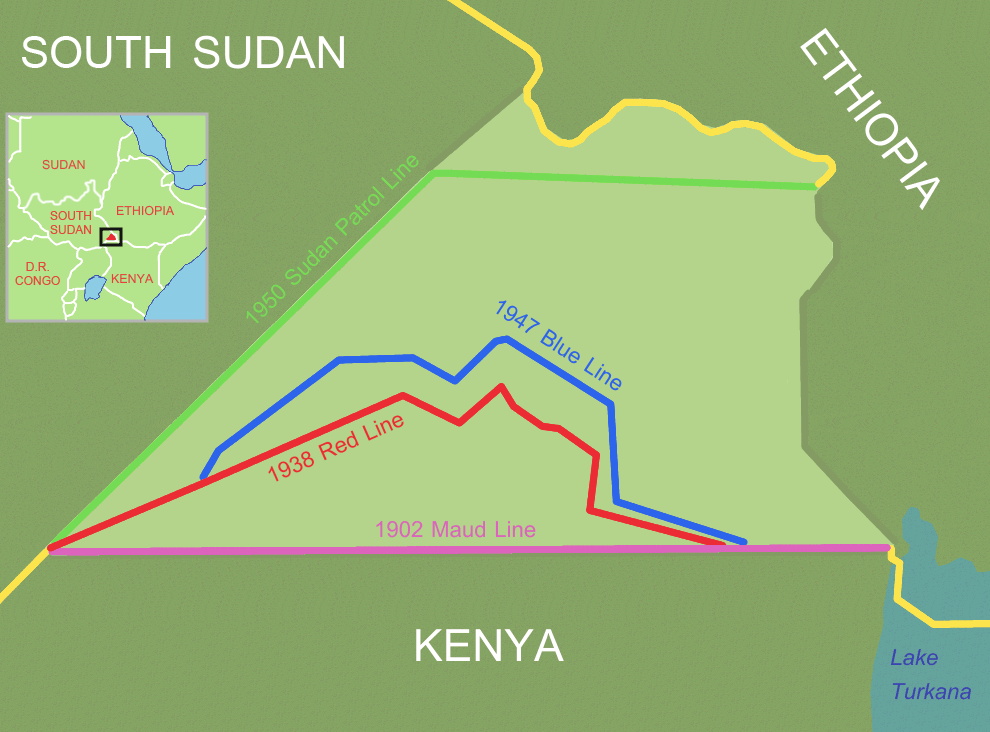
A map of the Ilemi Triangle showing 1938 "red line" or "Wakefield Line", 1947 "blue line" and Sudan's 1950 patrol line (green).

To the southeast of the Ilemi triangle, Ethiopian emperor Menelik laid claim to Lake Turkana and proposed a boundary with the British to run from the southern end of the lake eastwards to the Indian Ocean, which was shifted northwards when the British and Ethiopian governments signed a treaty in 1907, reaffirmed by a 1970 Ethiopia-Kenya treaty.

The Ethiopia-Sudan boundary, the "Maud Line", was surveyed by Captain Philip Maud of the Royal Engineers in 1902–03. It was adopted by the Anglo-Ethiopian Agreement treaty of December 6, 1907 between Ethiopia and British East Africa. Though vague on the precise details of where the Kenya-Sudan border was located, it clearly placed the entire Ilemi on the west side of the Ethiopia-Sudan line.

In 1914 the Uganda-Sudan Boundary Commission agreement provided Sudan access to Lake Turkana via the now-dry Sanderson Gulf at the southeast corner of the Ilemi (at the time Lake Turkana was the border between the British territories of Uganda and Kenya). After World War I, the Ethiopians armed the Nyangatom and Dassanech peoples, whereby the traditional raids turned into battles where hundreds died.

=== 1920s ===
In 1928, Sudan agreed to allow Kenyan military units across the 1914 line to protect the Turkana against the Dassanech and Nyangatom, although it cost £30,000 per year. In 1929, Kenya began subsidising Sudan to occupy the territory, which it did not wish to continue because of the perceived useless nature of it. In 1931, it was Sudan that agreed to subsidise Kenya to occupy the territory.

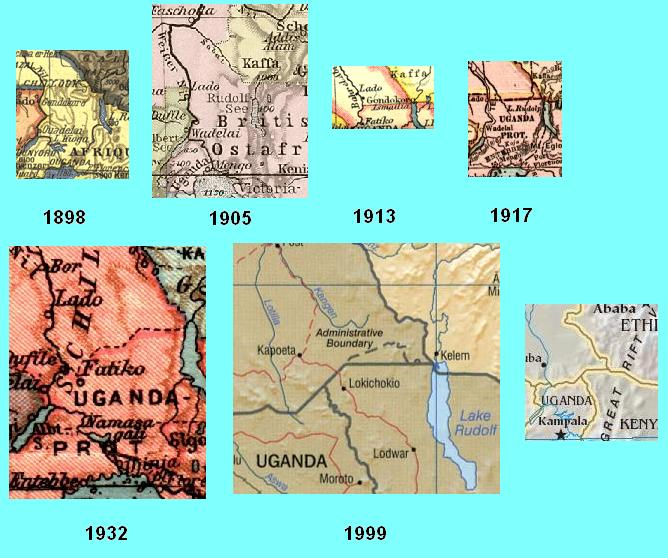
The Ilemi Triangle in different maps

=== 1930s ===
In 1931 the Red Line (the Glenday Line) was drawn to represent the northern boundary of Turkana grazing. "In a series of agreements from 1929 to 1934, the Governor-General of the Anglo-Egyptian Sudan and the Governor of Kenya agreed that this Red Line should be accepted as the Turkana grazing boundary."

After Italy invaded Ethiopia in 1936, Italy briefly claimed the area of the Ilemi triangle. A joint Kenya-Sudan survey team in 1938 demarcated the "Red Line" or "Wakefield Line", very close to the delimitation a few years earlier of this Red Line, marking the northern limit of grazing of Turkana.

While Egypt and Britain agreed on this, Italy did not. The Dassanetch and Nyangatom had suffered because of the Italian occupation, and wished to recoup their losses by making a raid against the Turkana. Several hundred Turkana people were killed in a raid in July 1939 by the Nyangatom and Dassanech peoples. Italy gave up their claim on the Ilemi subsequently, and allowed the British to respond with a raid on the Inyangatom and Dassanech supported by the Royal Air Force.

=== 1940s ===
British troops of the King's African Rifles occupied Ilemi in 1941 after the East African Campaign during World War II. The King's African Rifles passed through Ilemi on their way to southwestern Ethiopia. In 1944 Britain's Foreign Office surveyed a "blue line" which was further northwest than the "red line".

=== 1950s ===
Sudan, in 1950, established its own patrol line even further northwest into Sudan up to the border with Ethiopia, where they prohibited Kenyan and Ethiopian pastoralists from moving across it, giving up policing and development of the area south east of it. However, that Kenya-Sudan agreement specified that this patrol line in no way affected sovereignty; that it was not an international boundary, and money continued to be paid to Kenya to patrol this Sudanese territory.

There was conflict between 1949 and 1953 as Sudan attempted to keep the Nyangatom behind this line.

=== 1960s and 1970s ===
In 1967 President Jomo Kenyatta's administration had made overtures to the British in order to secure support for the cession of the Triangle to Kenya. The British were unresponsive and the results amounted to little. The matter was sidelined and successive Kenyan administrations have been seemingly willing to accept the territorial status quo and their de facto territorial control, even though Kenyan influence did diminish after the relocation of the Sudan People's Liberation Army to Sudan in the 1980s–90s.

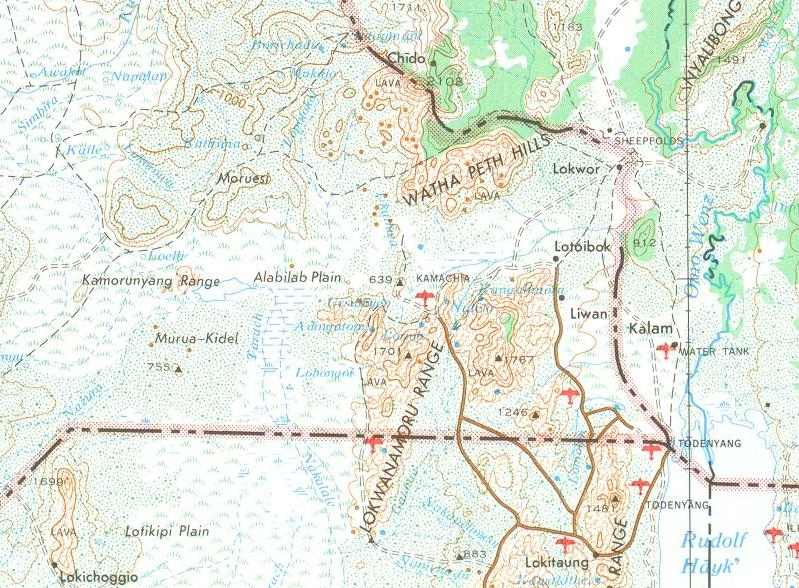
A 1978 topographic map of the Ilemi triangle, showing the "Maud line" as the only international border.

In 1964 Kenya and Ethiopia reaffirmed their boundary, confirming Kenyan sovereignty to Namuruputh, which is just south of the southeastern point of the triangle. In 1972 a Sudan-Ethiopia boundary alteration did not solve the Ilemi issue because it did not involve Kenya, but did confirm that Ethiopia had no claim to the Ilemi Triangle.

In 1978 Kenya began to publicly, unilaterally regard the Turkana grazing line of 1938 (Wakefield Line) as an international boundary between Kenya and Sudan.

=== 1980s ===
In 1986, Kenya began to widely circulate a new map which for the first time displayed the Ilemi Triangle as an integral part of its territory (no longer displaying the straight horizontal "Maud line").

=== Since the 1990s ===
In the 1990s, Ethiopia armed the Dassanech with Kalashnikov automatic rifles, perhaps in response to the Kenyan government arming in 1978 of the Turkana. Beginning in the 1960s, many Kenyan maps have marked the Red Line as the official boundary of Kenya, rather than a dotted boundary which it had been previously. More recently, many Kenyan maps depict the 1950 patrol line, the furthest northwest, as the boundary. There was a question as to whether a secret agreement was broached between Kenya and South Sudan to allow Kenya to administer this territory, in return for support in the Sudanese Civil War. In recent decades, the countries involved have had other priorities, delaying a resolution to the issue. The recent discovery of oil in the region also complicates resolution.

With the independence of South Sudan in 2011, the Sudanese claim to the Ilemi Triangle was transferred to the new national government in Juba.

== In fiction ==
The Ilemi Triangle is the main setting of the 2015 novel Land of Promise by New York Times bestseller list author James Wesley Rawles.

The area is the setting for the fictional country of Wakanda created by Marvel Comics in the Marvel Cinematic Universe.

== See also ==
- Halaib Triangle
- Al-Fashaga triangle
- Mandera triangle
