= Great Rift Valley =

Continuous geographic trench from Asia to Southeast Africa

The Great Rift Valley (GRV) is a series of contiguous geographic depressions, approximately 6,500 kilometres (4,000 mi) in total length, which, in its original definition, runs from "the plains of northern Syria" in the north, (Note: Ottoman Syria at the end of the 19th-century included what is now the southern Turkish Hatay Province.) through the Red Sea, to Mozambique in the south. The term remains in use in the fields of geography, zoology, ecology, paleontology and other disciplines, but it is now rarely used in geology where the term "Afro-Arabian Rift System" is preferred, which describes the series of geological structures that have given rise to the geographical feature. Great Rift Valley is also often used to refer to valleys, such as the Kenyan Rift Valley, within the East African Rift system.

The term was introduced by British geologist John Walter Gregory in 1896, following on from the work of Austrian geologist Eduard Suess, who first proposed the existence of a linked set of features extending from Syria to Mozambique.

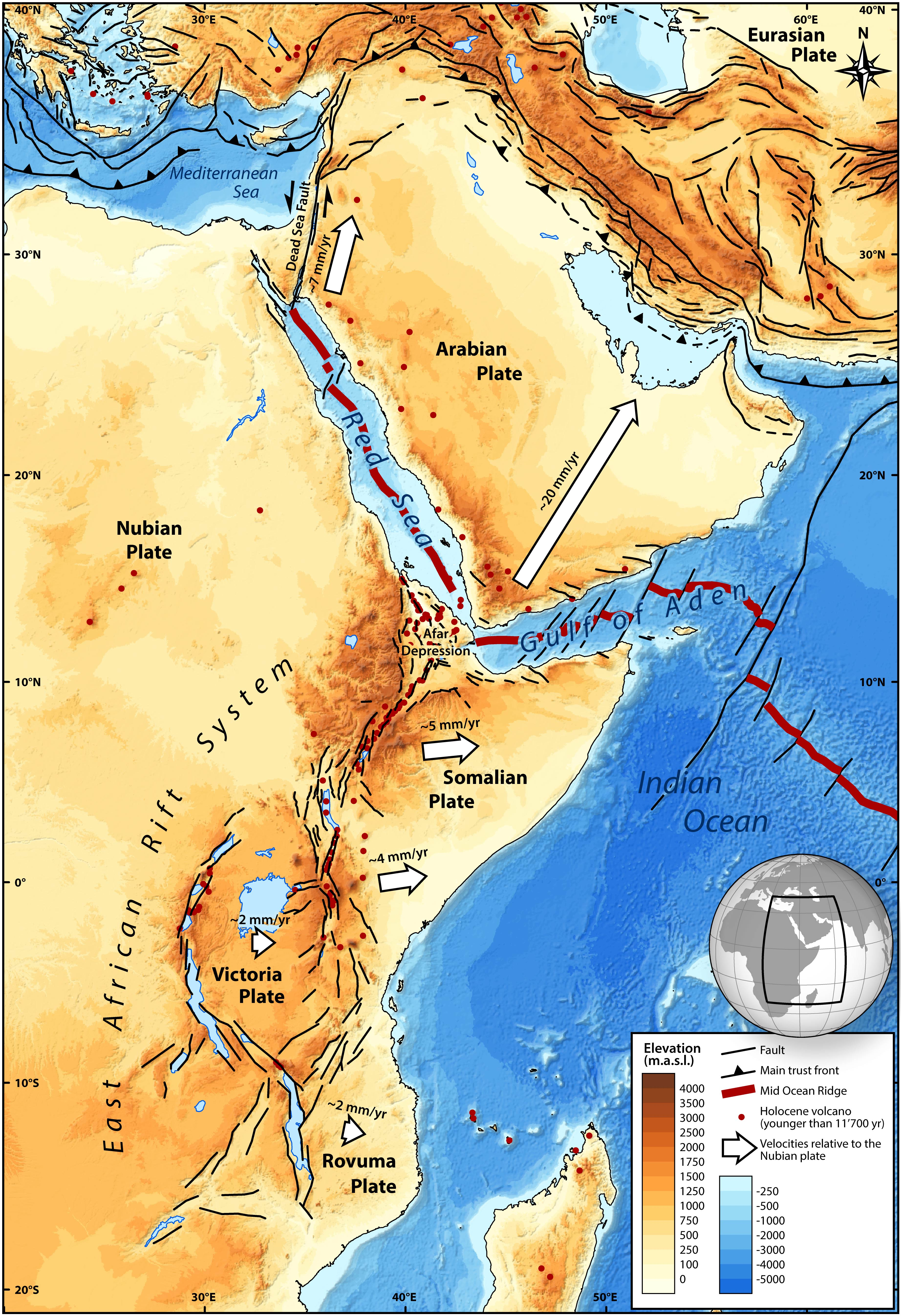
Tectonic map of the Afro-Arabian rift system, showing the Afar triple junction between the Red Sea rift, the Gulf of Aden rift, and the East African rift system with the velocities of each plate relative to the Nubian plate

== Geology ==
The Afro-Arabian Rift (AAR) is a series of major geological structures that have created the observed topographic features that make up the Great Rift Valley. The northern part of the AAR is formed by the Dead Sea Transform (DST) (also known as the Dead Sea or Levantine rift), the transform type boundary between the Arabian plate and the African (Nubian) plate. It extends southwards from the Marash triple junction in southeastern Turkey, where it meets the East Anatolian Fault, to the mouth of the Gulf of Aqaba where it joins with the Red Sea Rift. The dominant displacement along the DST is left-lateral strike-slip, with transtension along the southern part, transpression in the central section in Lebanon and local transtension within overall transpression in the northern part. Transtension has produced a series of pull-apart basins, the Dead Sea, Sea of Galilee, Hula basin and the Ghab basin. The transpression has led to the uplift of the Anti-Lebanon Mountains and Mount Lebanon either side of the Beqaa Valley.

The Red Sea Rift is a mid-ocean ridge that accommodates the increasing separation between the Nubian and Arabian plates. The southeastern end of the Red Sea Rift links to both the western end of the Aden Ridge and the northern end of the East African Rift system (EARS), at the Afar triple junction.

Sited next to the triple junction, the Afar triangle is an area of thinned and heavily intruded continental crust. The EARS continues to the south of the Afar triangle as the Main Ethiopian Rift passing through the strongly uplifted Ethiopian Highlands. Further south, the EARS splits into two main parts, the western Albertine Rift and the eastern Gregory Rift that pass to either side of the Victoria microplate, before joining again to the north of Lake Malawi. The EARS continues southwards to the coast along Lake Malawi and the Urema Graben. The Main Ethiopian and Gregory rifts are associated with major off-axis volcanism and many of the active basins within the rift are at least part filled with volcanic products. The Albertine Rift and its southward continuation into Mozambique are dominated by the formation of half-graben basins with major subsidence and flank uplifts.

== Geography ==
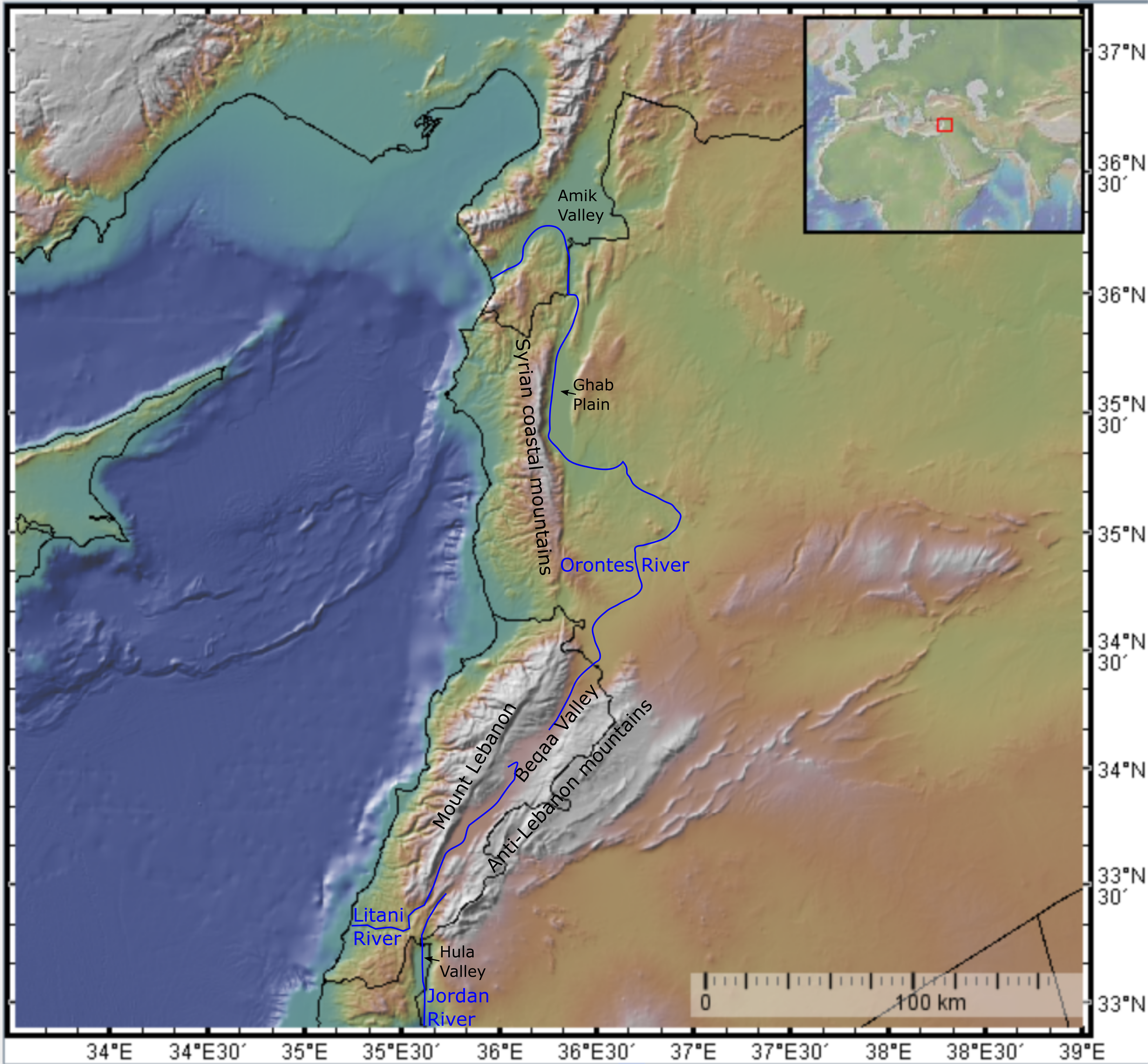
Topographic map of the northern Asian section

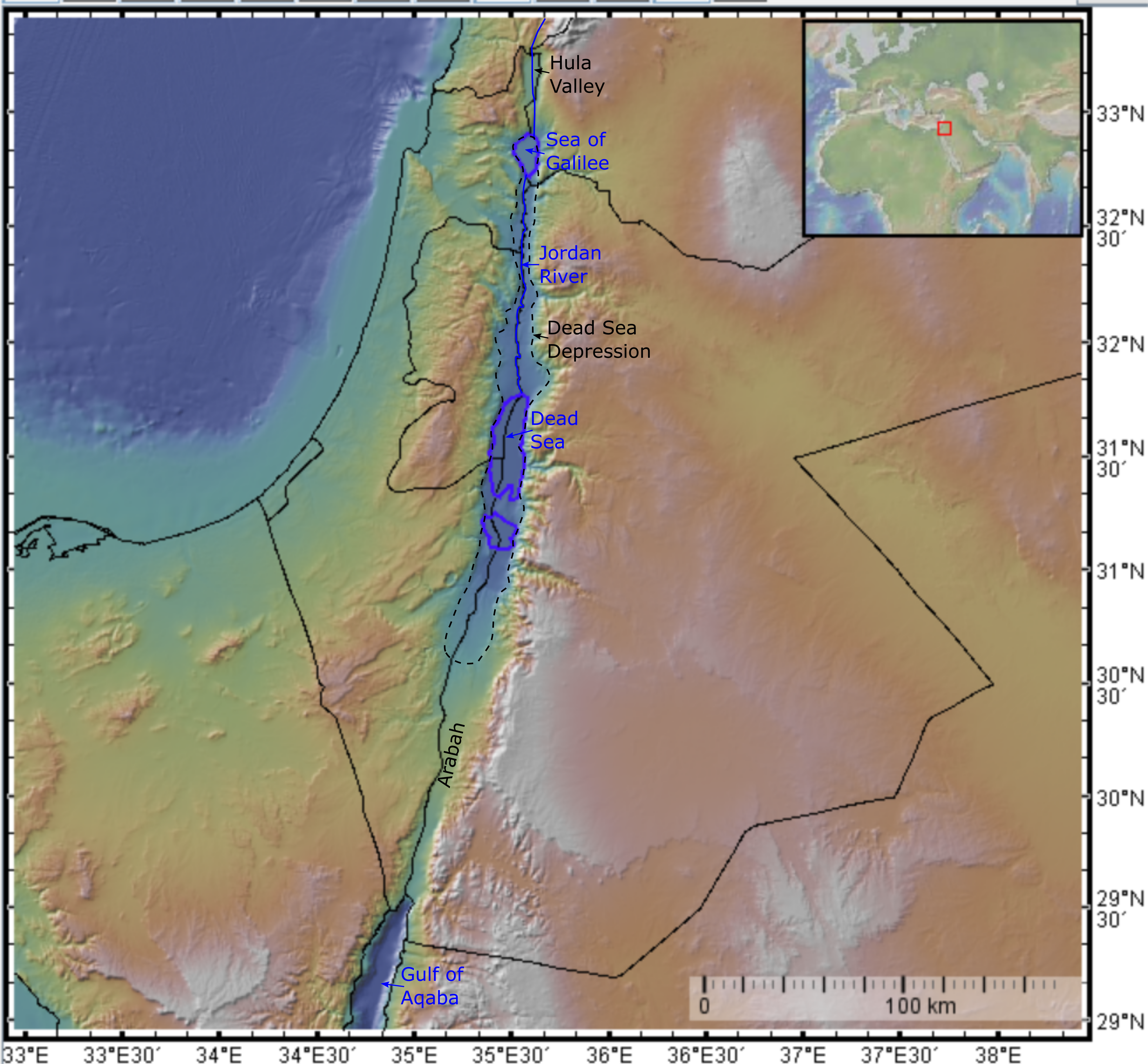
Topographic map of the southern Asian section

=== Asian section ===
The most northerly part of the GRV is the Ghab Plain, developed above the Ghab basin, along the valley of the Orontes River in northern Syria. The next section to the south of the Ghab plain is the Beqaa valley, which contains two rivers, the Orontes river, which drains northwards and the Litani, which drains southwestwards. At the southern end of the valley, where the Litani river turns abruptly westwards, it comes within 5 km of the Hisbai river, part of the headwaters of the Jordan river. Beyond the Beqaa valley, the remaining part of the GRF in Asia is known as the Jordan Rift Valley, extending down to the Red Sea. The Hula valley, which lies above the Hula basin, is a nearly completely flat valley at about 70 m elevation, confined between the drainage basin of the many tributaries of the Jordan river to the north, the Golan heights to the east, the Naftali mountains to the west, the drainage basin of further tributaries to the southwest and the Korazim plateau to the south. The Jordan river passes south through the plateau in a gorge before reaching the Sea of Galilee (Lake Kinneret). The Sea of Galilee is the most northerly part of the Dead Sea depression, the base of which is all below sea level. The full length of the depression was filled during the Pleistocene by Lake Lisan, although the lake surface was still about 200 m below sea level at its highest. The area of the depression below sea level is approximately 5,000 km^{2}. The deepest part of the depression is occupied by the Dead Sea, while another local deep is the location of the Sea of Galilee. Almost the entire depression is flanked by steep sides. The section between the Dead Sea depression and the Gulf of Aqaba is known as Arabah, the northern part of which is also known as the Arava valley. It rises steeply from the Dead Sea before rising much more gradually up to the watershed at an elevation of about 200m. before descending gradually to the Gulf of Aqaba. The southern part of this section is well-defined and narrower than the northern part, being generally 10 km or less wide, compared to 30 km further north, an area that lacks a clear western edge. The Gulf of Aqaba is a relatively narrow gulf that extends 160 km from the southern end of the Arabah valley to the Straits of Tiran, its junction with the Red Sea. It contains a set of deeps, the Elat, Aragonese, Dakar and Tiran, with the greatest depth being reached in the Aragonese deep of 1850 m. The gulf narrows and shallows markedly in the Strait of Tiran, being only 13 km wide and about 250 m deep. Beyond the strait, within the Red Sea, the ~1,400 m deep Hume Deep is also developed.

=== Red Sea ===
The Asian and African sections of the GRV are linked by the Red Sea. The Red Sea is characterised by broad relatively shallow flanks and a narrow (<60 km wide), deep central valley that reaches a maximum depth of 2,860 m.

=== African section ===
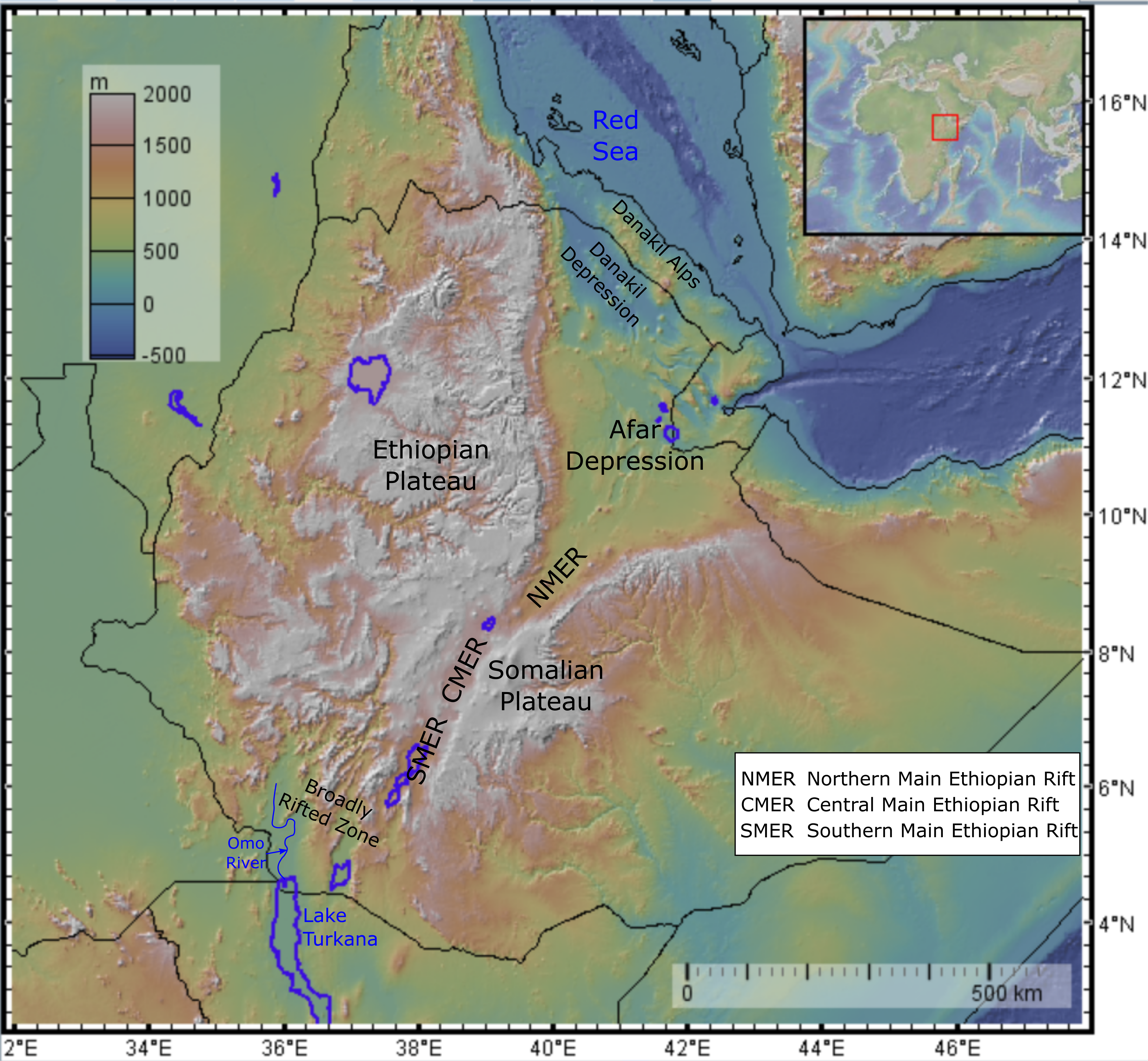
Topographic map of the Ethiopian section

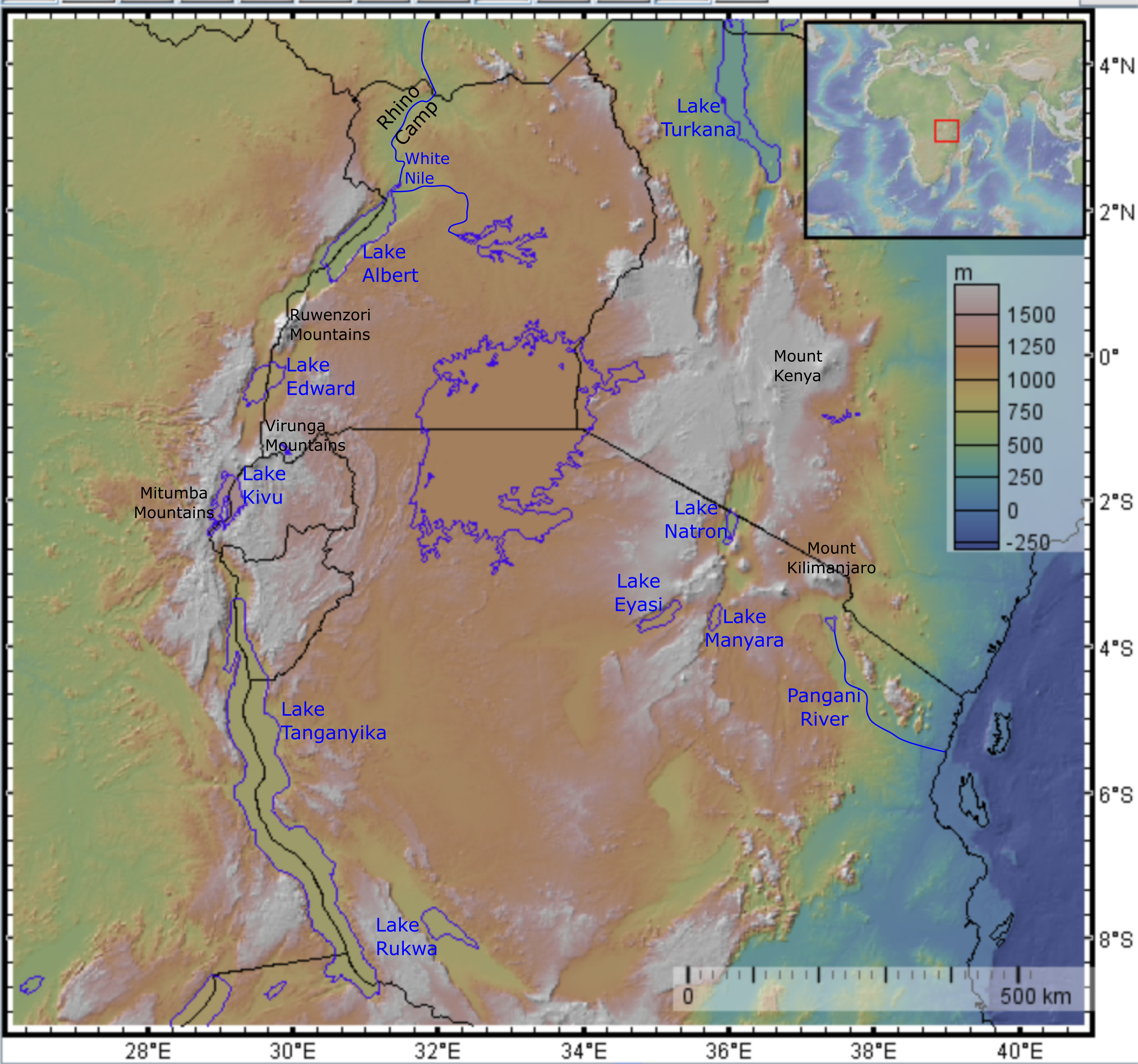
Topographic map of the Albertine and Gregory rifts

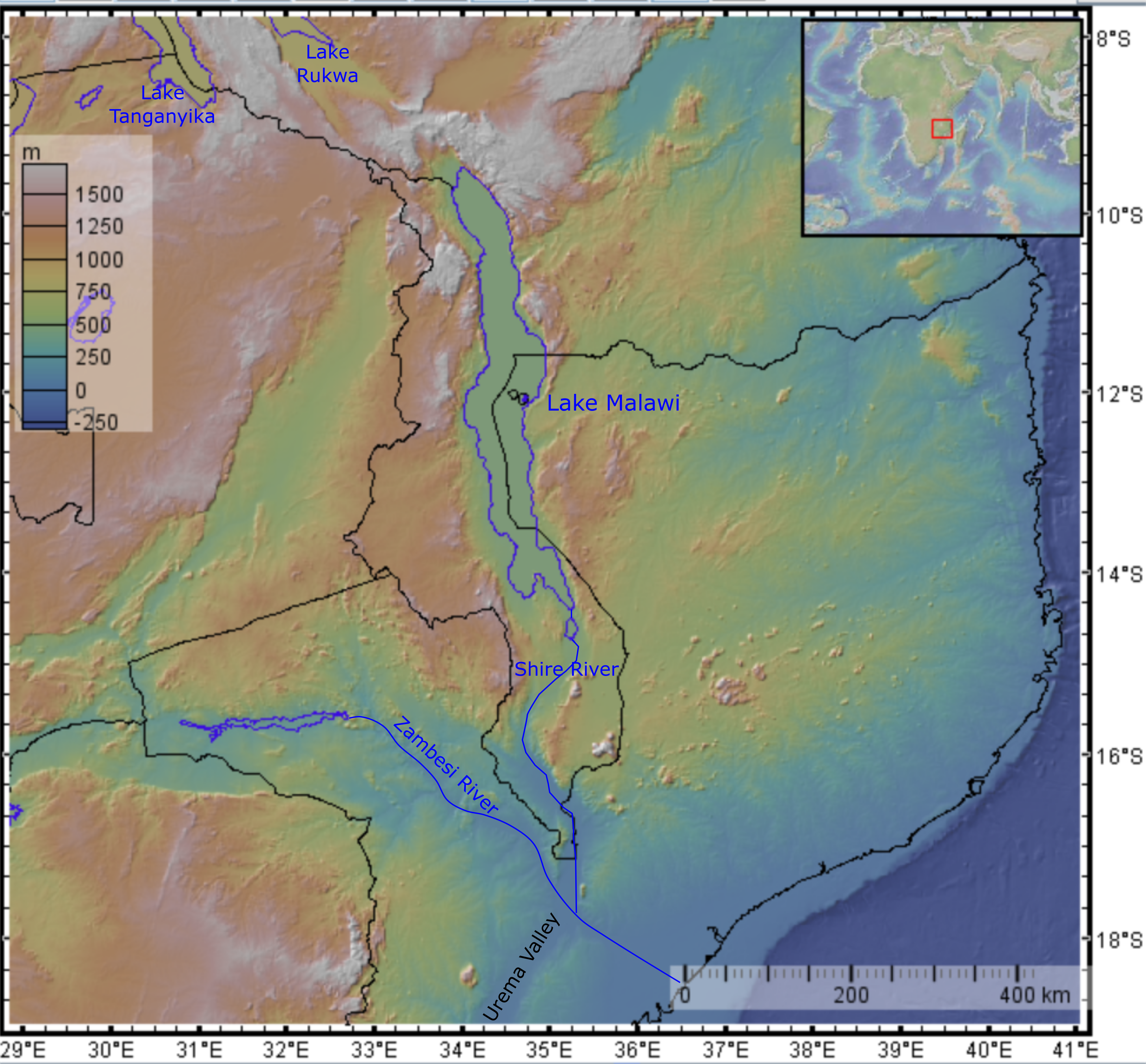
Topographic map of the southernmost section of the Great RIft Valley

The first feature south of the Red Sea that is considered to be part of the GRV is the Danakil Depression, within the Afar Depression, formed between the Ethiopian plateau to the west and the Danakil Alps to the east. The deepest part of the depression is well below sea level, reaching a general ~120m below in the northern part. To the south the depression becomes progressively obscured by the volcanic Erta Ale Range. The next clearly defined section of the GRV is the Main Ethiopian Rift (MER) valley, bordered by the Ethiopian and Somalian plateaus. The MER has an overall northeast–southwest trend and has been divided into three parts; the northern, central and southern sections. The northern MER extends southwards from the Afar Depression as far as Lake Koka. It is characterised by a high level of volcanic activity. The central section extends from Lake Koka to Lake Awasa, while the southern section runs from there to what is known as the "broadly rifted zone". The central and southern sections contain several lakes and are less affected by volcanic activity. The level of the rift valley floor in the MER climbs continuously from the Afar Depression into the central section, where it reaches an elevation of about 1,700 m, before descending gradually into the "broadly-rifted zone".

In the "broadly rifted zone", the GRV becomes indistinct. Further south the GRV splits into two separate parts, the western or Albertine rift and the eastern or Gregory rift. The northernmost part of the eastern branch is formed by the valley of the Omo river in southern Ethiopia and Lake Turkana in Kenya. Much of the eastern branch lies in Kenya and is often referred to as the Kenya Rift Valley. The rift valley floor is punctuated by relatively small lakes and numerous volcanoes. Many of these lakes are saline and alkaline in nature, such as Lake Bogoria and Lake Natron. The eastern part of the GRV continues into Tanzania, where it spreads out in what is known as the "North Tanzanian Divergence", with rift structures extending to the southwest (Lake Eyasi), to the south (Lake Manyara) and the Pangani River basin to the southeast. In addition to the smaller volcanoes along the rift axis, there are large volcanic edifices on the rift shoulders, such as Mount Kenya and Mount Kilimanjaro, the highest mountains in Africa. There are national parks associated with many of the lakes and the larger volcanoes, such as the Lake Baringo National Park, the Lake Nakuru National Park and the Mount Kenya National Park.

The western branch of the GRV starts from the north with the Rhino Camp basin, before stepping to the southeast and continuing along Lake Albert. The Albert River (part of the White Nile) passes through this zone of overlap and on through the Rhino Camp basin. The western branch consists mainly of a series of deep lakes, Lake Albert, Lake Rutanzige, Lake Kivu, Lake Tanganyika and Lake Rukwa. Of these, only Rukwa is endorheic and alkaline, with the others being through-drained and freshwater. Lake Tanganyika is the second largest and second deepest freshwater lake in the world. The western branch is bordered by some of the highest mountains in Africa, including the Virunga Mountains, Mitumba Mountains, and Ruwenzori Range. Much of this area lies within the boundaries of national parks, such as Virunga National Park in the Democratic Republic of Congo, Rwenzori National Park and Queen Elizabeth National Park in Uganda, and Volcanoes National Park in Rwanda.

The southernmost section of the GRV includes Lake Malawi, the third-deepest freshwater body in the world, which reaches 706 metres (2,316 ft) in depth and separates the Nyassa plateau of Northern Mozambique from Malawi. The rift extends southwards from Lake Malawi as the valley of the Shire River, which flows from the lake into the Zambezi River. The rift valley continues south, beyond the Zambezi, as the Urema Valley of central Mozambique.

== Ornithology ==
The Great Rift Valley/Red Sea flyway is recognised as an important part of the Asian–East African Flyway and the second most important flyway globally for migratory soaring birds. Species that use this route include the European honey buzzard (Pernis apivorus), the Steppe eagle (Aquila nipalensis), Common buzzard (Buteo buteo), the Lesser spotted eagle (Clanga pomarina), the White Stork (Ciconia ciconia) and the Great White Pelican (Pelecanus onocrotalus).

== Other uses ==
In many other fields such as epidemiology (see for instance Rift Valley fever), paleontology, archaeology, ecology and zoology, the term is used to describe the local part of the GRV that is relevant to the particular study.
