= Afar triple junction =

Place where three tectonic rifts meet in East Africa

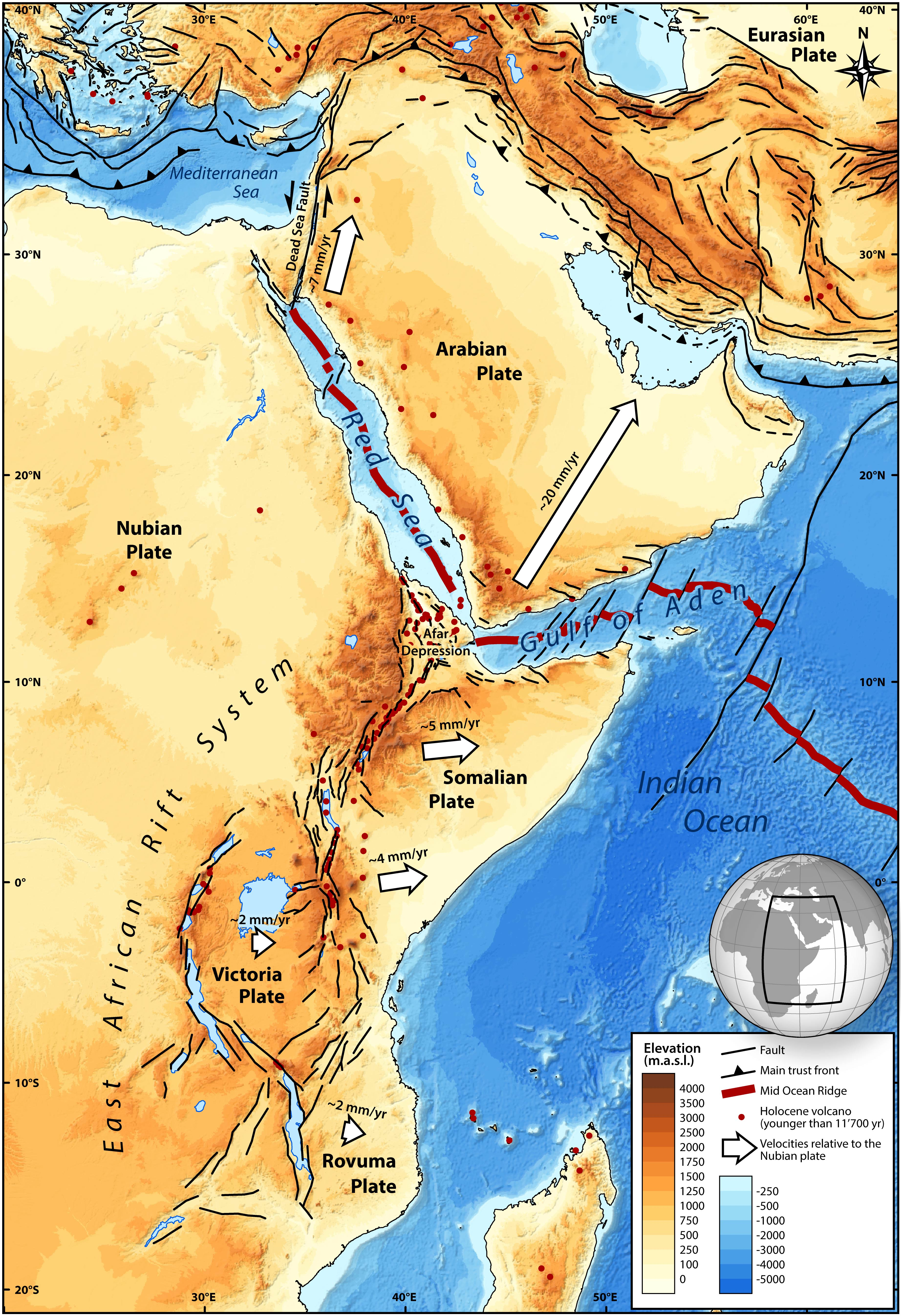
Tectonic map of the Afro-Arabian rift system, showing the Afar triple junction between the Red Sea rift, the Gulf of Aden rift, and the East African rift system with the velocities of each plate relative to the Nubian plate.

The Afar triple junction is a triple junction located along a divergent plate boundary dividing the Nubian, Somali, and Arabian plates. This area is considered a present-day example of continental rifting leading to seafloor spreading and producing an oceanic basin. Here, the Red Sea Rift meets the Aden Ridge and the East African Rift. The latter extends a total of 6,500 kilometers (4,000 mi) from the Afar Triangle to Mozambique.

The connecting three arms form a triple junction. The northernmost branching arm extends north through the Red Sea and into the Dead Sea, while the eastern arm extends through the Gulf of Aden and connects to the Mid-Indian Ocean ridge further to the east. Both of these rifting arms are below sea level and are similar to a mid-ocean ridge.

The third rifting arm runs south extending around 4,000 kilometres (2,500 mi) through the countries of Kenya, Uganda, the Democratic Republic of Congo, Rwanda, Burundi, Tanzania, Zambia, Malawi and, finally, Mozambique. This southern rifting arm is better known as the East African Rift or the East African Rift System (EARS), when it includes the Afar Triangle.

At small scale, the tectonics of the Afar region is more complex than a textbook triple junction. An independent microplate, the Danakil (or Arrata) microplate, is found between the Afar rift and the Red Sea rift.

== Doming and rifting ==
A rift is the result of pulling apart or extension of lithosphere, including the crust, caused by mantle upwelling where hotter asthenosphere magma rises up into the colder lithosphere to stretch and thin it.

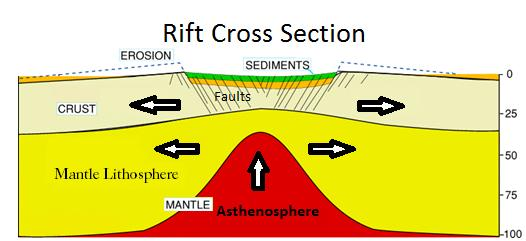
The internal dynamics of a rift system.

The triple rift is thought to have begun in the Late Cretaceous epoch to the Paleogene period. At that time the African plate was experiencing far-field stresses caused by portions of the northern boundary of the African plate subducting under the Eurasian plate. Today, the Arabian plate is experiencing a crustal down pull, or slab pull, that has separated from the African plate. At the same time as the subduction in the north, there was mantle upwelling causing the crust to down warp and swell into domes throughout the East African Rift System. The Kenyan dome has been studied extensively.

The plume is thought to have begun under Lake Tana in Ethiopia. Based on the environmental correlations and current topographic locations of the Jurassic Upper Limestone and Cretaceous Upper Sandstone, the net rock uplift of the Ethiopian Plateau would be 2.2 km (1.4 mi) since c. 150 Mya. The thinned Ethiopian lithosphere could have resulted in ponding from mantle plume and subsequent uplift.

Gani et al. (2007) propose that episodic increase of incision of the Ethiopian Plateau suggests episodic growth rates within the plateau, since the incision rates have no correlation to the past climate events. As an effect of Archimedes' principle of isostatic rebound, 2.05 km uplift has occurred within the last 30 million years. Baker et al. (1972) also suggest that the uplift of this area is sporadic and divided by long periods of stability and erosion. Some periods of uplift are recorded at the end of the Cretaceous that resulted in 400 metres (1,300 ft) of uplift and the end of the Neogene with a staggering 1,500 metres (4,900 ft) in magnitude. The Ethiopian dome experienced its largest uplift coinciding with the end of the Neogene uplift associated with the Kenyan dome. It has been argued that the current Ethiopian plateau is a result of the most recent uplift of 500 metres (1,600 ft) estimated to be an Oligocene–early Miocene event. But the most accepted argument of the plateau is the result of the Paleogene flood-basalts. The uplift associated with both domes has resulted in major structural features due to the swelling and warped crustal extension. The two areas of swelling resulted in a large depression between the two domes and subsidence along the coastal regions. The uplift caused by the Ethiopian dome resulted in a massive faulting area of 1,000 metres (3,300 ft) in the Afar region.

=== East African Rift ===
The East African Rift is an active rift between the Nubian and Somali protoplates. This rift is caused by elevated heat flow from the mantle under Kenya and the Afar region. Trending NNE to SSW, the East African Rift is composed of a western and an eastern branch. The eastern branch (sometimes called the Gregory Rift) is characterized by high volcanic activity and the western branch (sometimes called the Albertine Rift) is characterized by deeper basins, which contain lakes and sediments. The lakes in this area (e.g. Lake Tanganyika and Lake Rukwa) are located in highly rifted basins and have an inter-fingering relationship with faults. Many of the lakes are bounded by normal or strike-slip faults. The extension rate for this rift starts at about 6 millimetres per year (0.24 in/year) in the north, and declines to the south.

=== Red Sea Rift ===
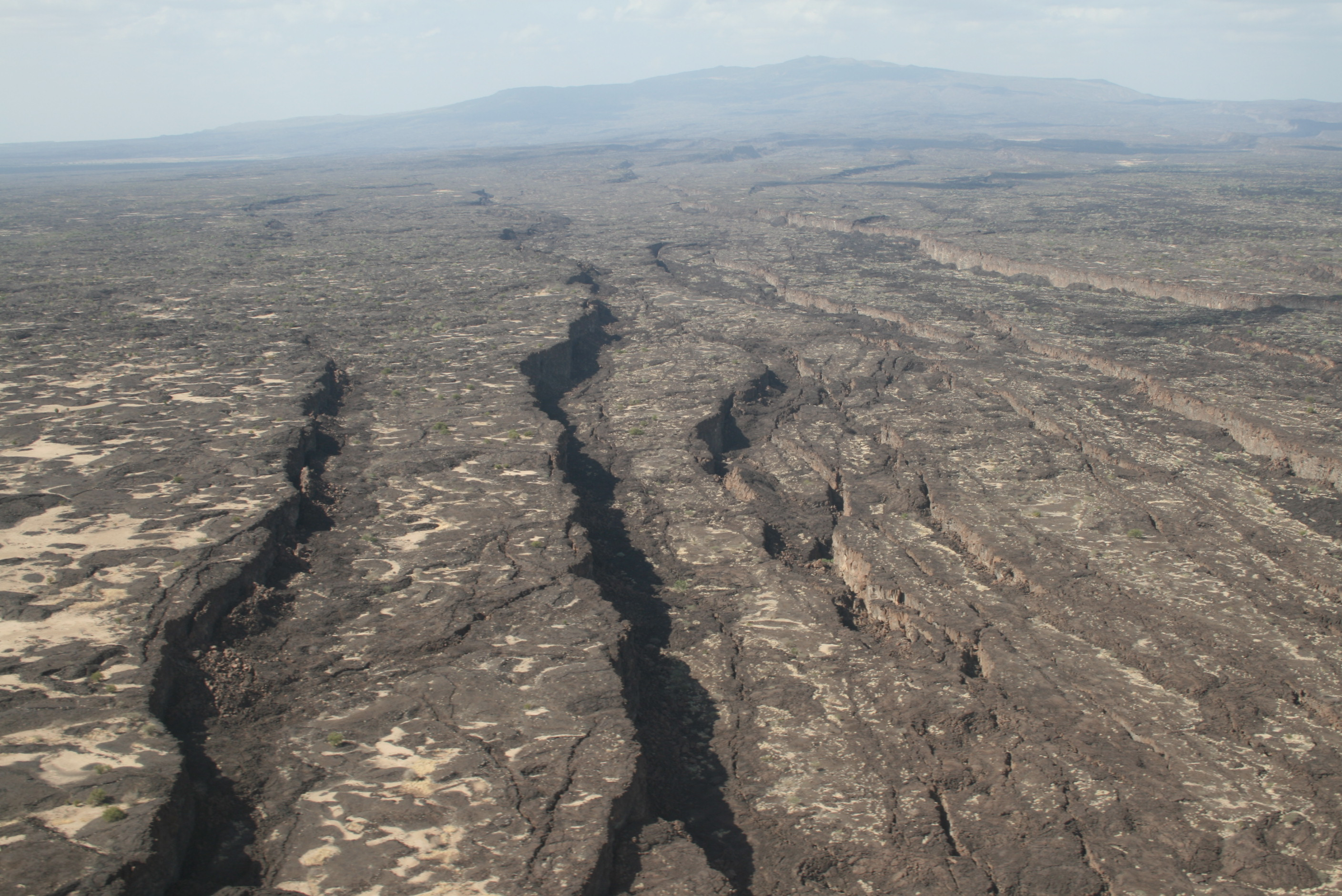
Manda-Hararo rift in the Afar region of Ethiopia with Dabbahu Volcano in the background

The Red Sea Rift is between the African (or Nubian) and Arabian plates. The rift runs along the length of the Red Sea, starting from the Dead Sea to the Afar triple junction. Within the rift, in the Red Sea, there are many volcanoes, including the Jabal al-Tair. The extension rate for this rift varies from about 7 to 17 millimetres per year (0.28 to 0.67 in/year).

=== Aden Ridge ===
The Aden Ridge is a divergent plate boundary that divides the African (or Somali) and Arabian plate. It extends from the triple junction eastward to the Owen fracture zone, where it meets the Aden–Owen–Carlsberg triple junction between the African, Arabian, and Indo-Australian plates. The spreading rate for Aden Ridge is about 17 millimetres per year (0.67 in/year) near the Afar triple junction.

=== Afar Depression ===
Before the initial rifting began, Africa was one plate, but as rifting proceeded the plate it began to tear into the Arabian, Somali, and Nubian plates (with the Nubian still sometimes called the African plate).

According to McKenzie and Morgan's 1969 classification, the Afar triple junction is of ridge-ridge-ridge (RRR) type, describing the movement of the three plates with respect to each other. The Arabian, Somali, and Nubian plates are all divergent margins with respect to the adjacent plates. Following Mackenzie and Morgan's stability model, RRR geometry will continue stably through time until there is a change in the tectonic movement.

The Afar Depression is a geological depression that ranges in height from 1,000 to −120 m (3,280 to −390 ft) The area has experienced many domal uplifts, including the Afar dome beginning 40 Mya. This uplift caused massive crustal extension leading to horst and graben structures associated with normal, extensional, faults. The uplift ended in collapse around 25 Mya into the Afar depression covering more than 200,000 km^{2} (77,000 sq mi) and spreading at a rate of 6 to 17 millimetres per year (0.24 to 0.67 in/year).

== Implications of volcanism ==
There are many active volcanic areas centralized in the East African Rift System in comparison to the other areas in the Afro-Arabian rift system. Many protruding horsts show successive layers of flood basalts, which can be approximately dated using ^{40}Ar/^{39}Ar-isotope dating. It is found to be approximately 30 million years old. The trap series is dated to a time soon before the major rifting events began. Chorowicz (2005) illustrated the trap series surrounding the newer Neogene volcanics. This helps quantify the amount of crustal extension and gives a model of pre-rifting crustal connection.

=== Tomography ===
Seismic tomography compiles P-wave and S-wave data from movements within the earth to create a 3D velocity model of the Earth's subsurface. The models distinguish between fast velocity, high anomaly, and slow velocity, slow anomaly, time measurements.

Multiple tomography models show a slow anomaly structure beneath southern Africa. Grand et al. (1997) model the large anomaly to extend from the base of the mantle to approximately 1,000 kilometres (620 mi) depth. This slow anomaly is considered to be a plume upwelling.

== Potential opening of an ocean basin ==
Horsts and grabens are very well documented throughout this region. Although they do show and produce crustal extension for a sufficient ocean basin to form, there needs to be extension that can accommodate for the extensive down fall of the grabens. Listric faults produce the correct model for this sufficient crustal extension. These faults have been documented by Chorowicz (2005) and aid in further verification of the future of this region and the potential for continued extension and subsidence.

Some past rifting events have been seen to have an aulacogen (failed arm) together with two successful rifting arms. Some geologists have proposed that the East African Rift System will be the aulacogen in the future, failing to produce an ocean basin, but as of present-day there seems to be no aulacogen and the EARS does not show any evidence of slower rifting.

There is also the possibility of a subduction zone forming along the eastern side of the Somali plate, caused by the spreading of the EARS and the Mid-Indian Oceanic ridge. To accommodate the compression of the Somali plate due to two extensional edges, the oceanic plate might begin to subduct below the continental plate.
