= Danakil microplate =

Tectonic plate in Africa

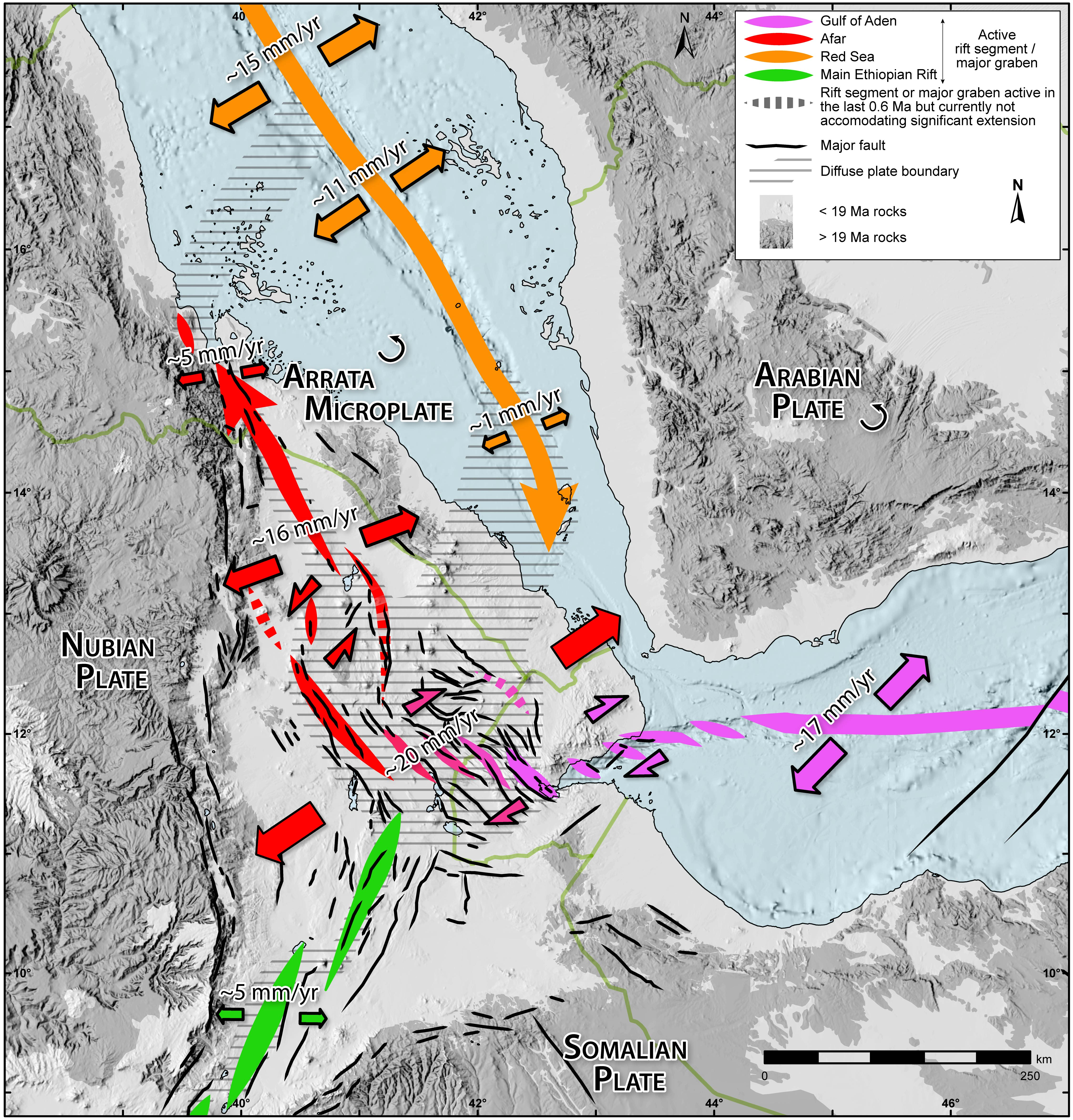
- Type: Microplate
- Approximate area: 100,000 km^{2} (39,000 sq mi)
- Movement^{1}: Counterclockwise rotation
- Speed^{1}: 0 - 18 mm/yr
- Features: Afar Triangle, Red Sea Rift, Gulf of Aden, East African Rift
- ^{1}Relative to the African plate

The Danakil microplate (also called Arrata microplate) is a small tectonic plate, (called a microplate) situated in the horn of Africa, spanning over Eritrea and Ethiopia.

The Danakil microplate is surrounded by the Nubian plate and the Arabian plate, and is adjacent to the Somalian plate. The extension velocities relative to the Nubian plate vary between 0 mm/yr in the north and 18 mm/yr in the south. Extension velocities relative to the Arabian plate vary from 0 mm/yr in the south to 15 mm/yr in the north. Theses variations imply that the Danakil microplate is rotating counterclockwise. This also implies that the Afar rift is propagating towards the north and the Red Sea rift is propagating towards the south, forming a large-scale relay structure.

The Danakil microplate comprises a continental part, forming the Danakil Alps and parts of coastal areas of Eritrea, and an oceanic part, forming the southernmost part of the Red Sea.

The movement of the Danakil microplate started approximately 11 Ma ago. The southern part of the microplate was dragged northeastward by the Arabian plate after the cessation of rifting in the Bab-el-Mandeb region, while the northern part of the microplate was probably already separated from the Arabian plate by the mid-ocean ridge of the Red Sea.

The position of the southern and northern limits of the Danakil microplate are difficult to constrain because they are situated on the Euler pole (the poles of rotation) relative to the Arabian and Nubian plates, respectively. The relative movements of both plate sets therefore tends to zero in these areas, precluding the formation of structures clearly visible at the surface or on geophysical data.

== Difference with the Danakil block ==
The microplate is called the Danakil microplate by most authors. Others prefer the name Arrata microplate (after the Afar name of the Danakil Alps) to distinguish it from the Danakil block. The Danakil block refers to a continental block (or microcontinent) running from the Buri peninsula in Eritrea in the north to the Gulf of Tadjoura in Djibouti in the south, while the Arrata/Danakil microplate refers to the rigid tectonic plate. The Danakil block forms the continental part of the Danakil microplate in the north, but is sitting on the Arabian plate in the south. However, this division is recent (from a geological point of view) as paleomagnetic data show that the southern part of the Danakil block rotated with the present-day Danakil microplate in the past.

== See also ==
- Danakil Desert
