= Afar Triangle =

Geological depression caused by the Afar triple junction

Coordinates: 11.5°N 41.0°E

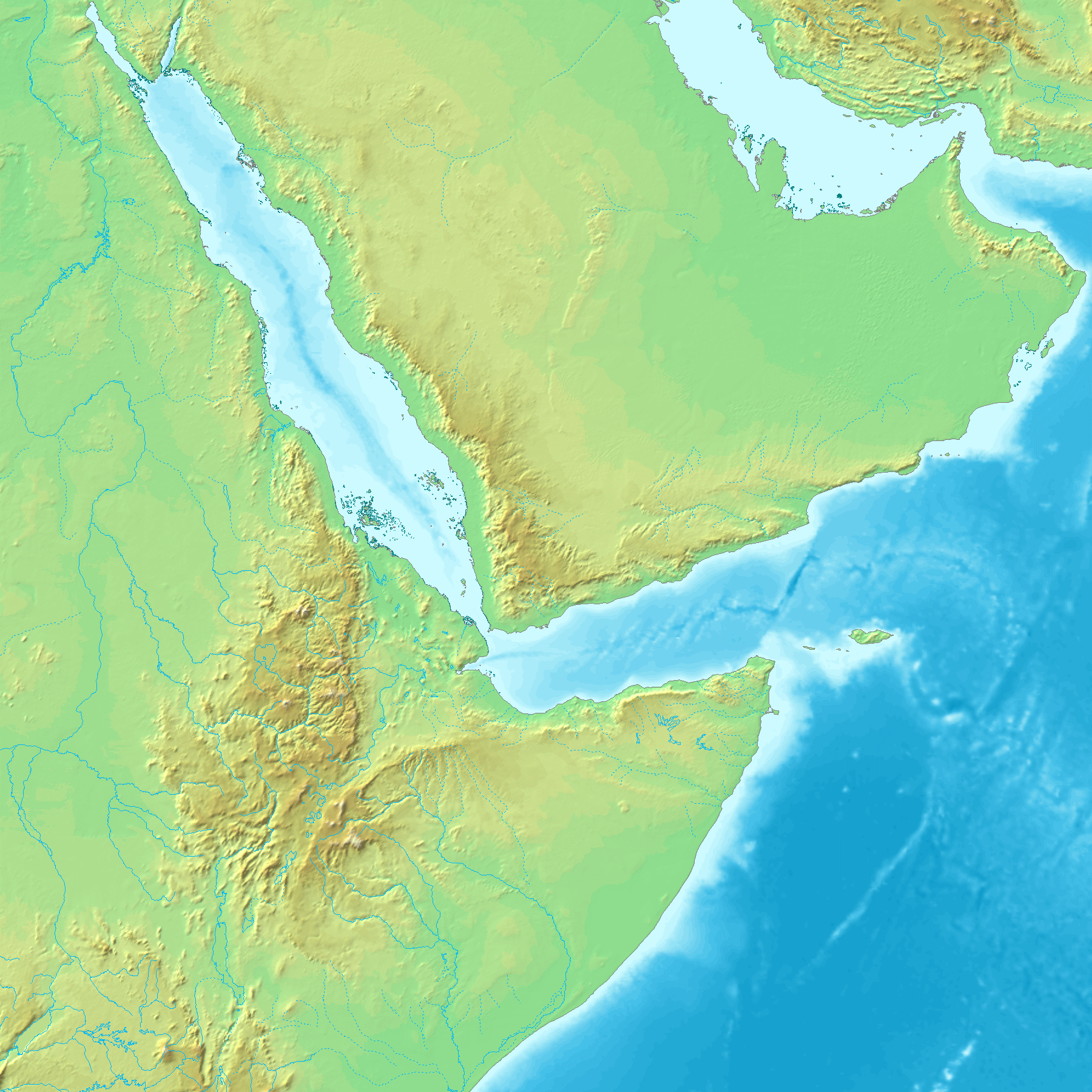
Topographic map showing the Afar Triangle

The Afar Triangle (also called the Afar Depression) is a geological depression caused by the Afar triple junction, which is part of the Great Rift Valley in East Africa. The region has disclosed fossil specimens of the earliest hominins; that is, the earliest of the human clade. As a result, the Depression is thought by some paleontologists to be the cradle of human evolution. The Depression borders Eritrea, Djibouti, and the entire Afar Region of Ethiopia. It contains the lowest point in Africa, Lake Assal, Djibouti, at 155 m (509 ft) below sea level.

The Awash River is the main waterflow into the region, but it runs dry during the annual dry season, and ends as a chain of saline lakes. The northern part of the Afar Depression is also known as the Danakil Depression. The lowlands are affected by heat, drought, and minimal air circulation, and contain the hottest places (year-round average temperatures) of anywhere on Earth.

The Afar Triangle is bordered as follows (see the topographic map): on the west by the Ethiopian Plateau and escarpment; to the north-east (between it and the Red Sea) by the Danakil block; to the south by the Somali Plateau and escarpment; and to the south-east by the Ali-Sabieh block (adjoining the Somali Plateau).

Many important fossil localities exist in the Afar region, including the Middle Awash region and the sites of Hadar, Dikika, and Woranso-Mille. These sites have produced specimens of the earliest (fossil) hominins and of human tool culture, as well as many fossils of various flora and fauna.

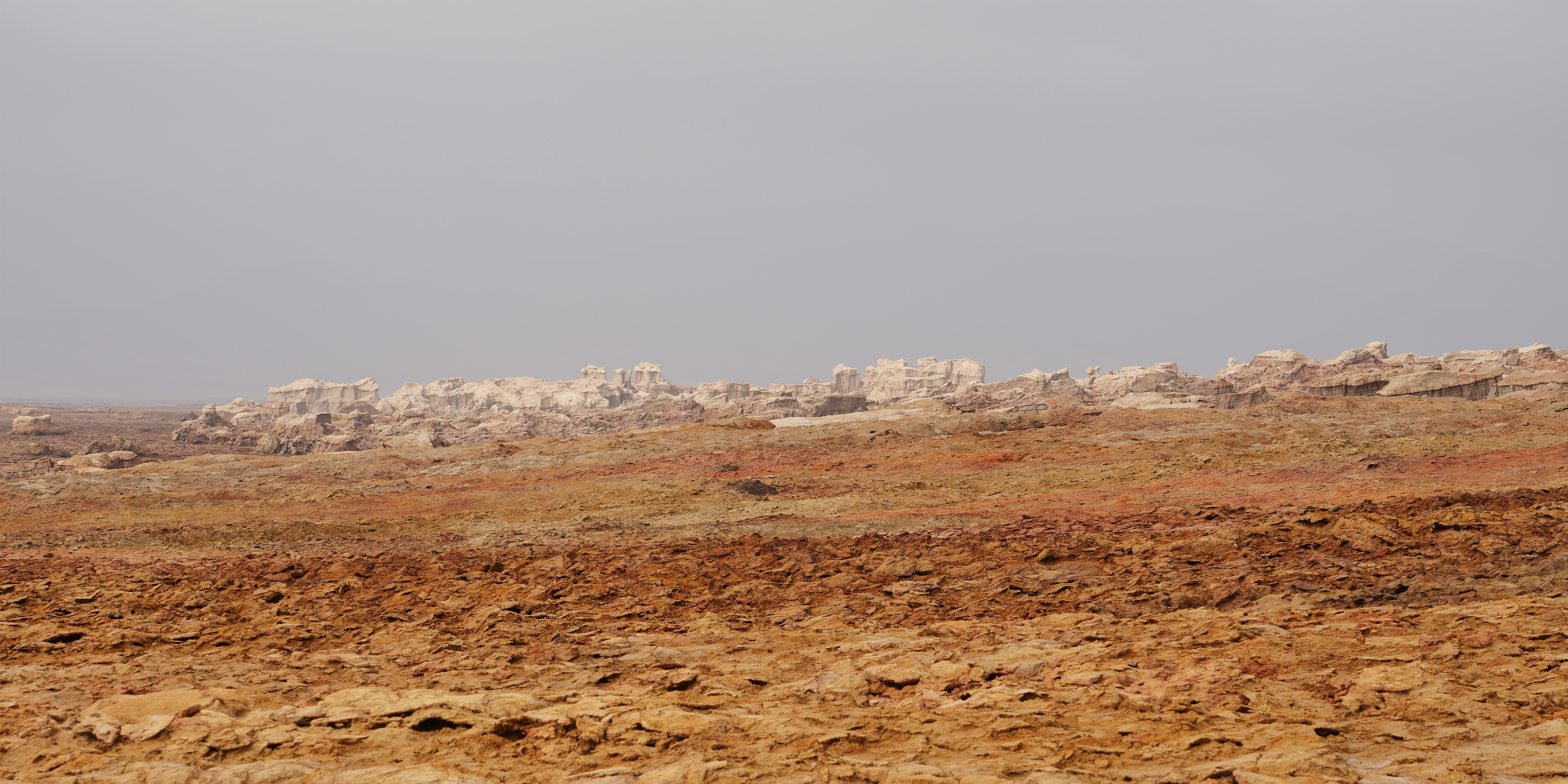
Landscape in Dallol

== Environment ==
Dallol hot springs and geothermal formations

Dallol in the Danakil Depression is one of the hottest places year-round anywhere on Earth. There is no rain for most of the year; the yearly rainfall averages range from 100 to 200 mm (4 to 8 in), with even less rain falling closer to the coast. Daily mean temperatures at Dallol ranged from 30 °C (86 °F) in January to 39 °C (102 °F) in July in six years of observations from 1960 to 1966.

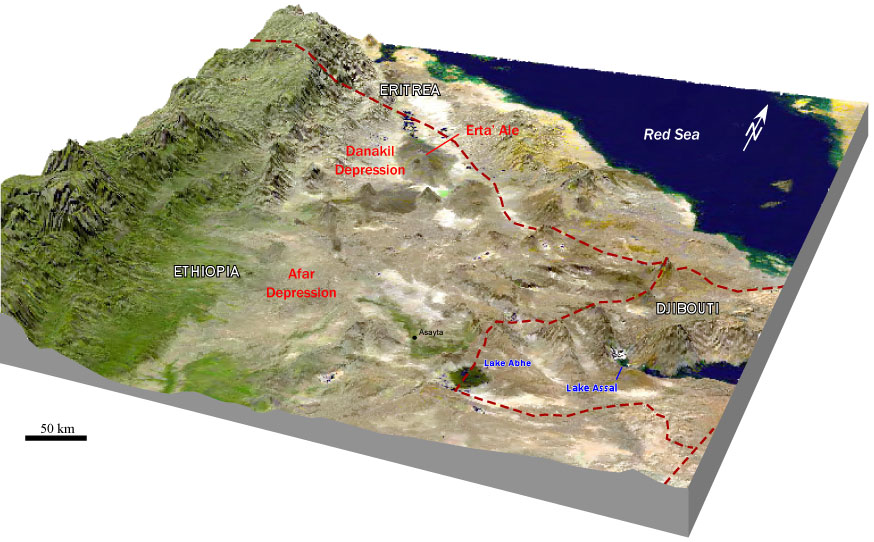
Perspective view of the Afar Depression and environs, generated by draping a Landsat image over a digital elevation model.

The Awash River, flowing north-eastward through the southern part of the Afar Region, provides a narrow green belt which enables life for the flora and fauna in the area and for the Afars, the nomadic people living in the Danakil Desert. About 128 kilometres (80 mi) from the Red Sea the Awash ends in a chain of salt lakes, where its waterflow evaporates as quickly as it is supplied. Some 1,200 km^{2} (460 sq mi) of the Afar Depression is covered by salt deposits, and mining salt is a major source of income for many Afar groups.

The Afar Depression biome is characterized as desert scrubland. Vegetation is mostly confined to drought-resistant plants such as small trees (e.g. species of the dragon tree), shrubs, and grasses. Wildlife includes many herbivores such as Grévy's zebra, Soemmerring's gazelle, beisa and, notably, the last viable population of African wild ass (Equus africanus somalicus).

Birds include the ostrich, the endemic Archer's lark, the secretary bird, Arabian and Kori bustards, Abyssinian roller, and crested francolin. In the southern part of the plain lies the Mille-Serdo Wildlife Reserve.

The Afar Triangle is a cradle source of the earliest hominins. It contains a paleo-archaeological district that includes the Middle Awash region and numerous prehistoric sites of fossil hominin discoveries, including: the hominids and possible hominins, Ardi, or Ardipithecus ramidus, and Ardipithecus kadabba, see below; the Gawis cranium hominin from Gona; several sites of the world's oldest stone tools; Hadar, the site of Lucy, the fossilized specimen of Australopithecus afarensis; and Dikika, the site of the fossilized child Selam, an australopithecine hominin.

In 1994, near the Awash River in Ethiopia, Tim D. White found the then-oldest known human ancestor: 4.4 million-year-old Ar. ramidus. A fossilized almost complete skeleton of a female hominin which he named "Ardi", it took nearly 15 years to safely excavate, preserve, and describe the specimen and to prepare publication of the event.

== Geology ==
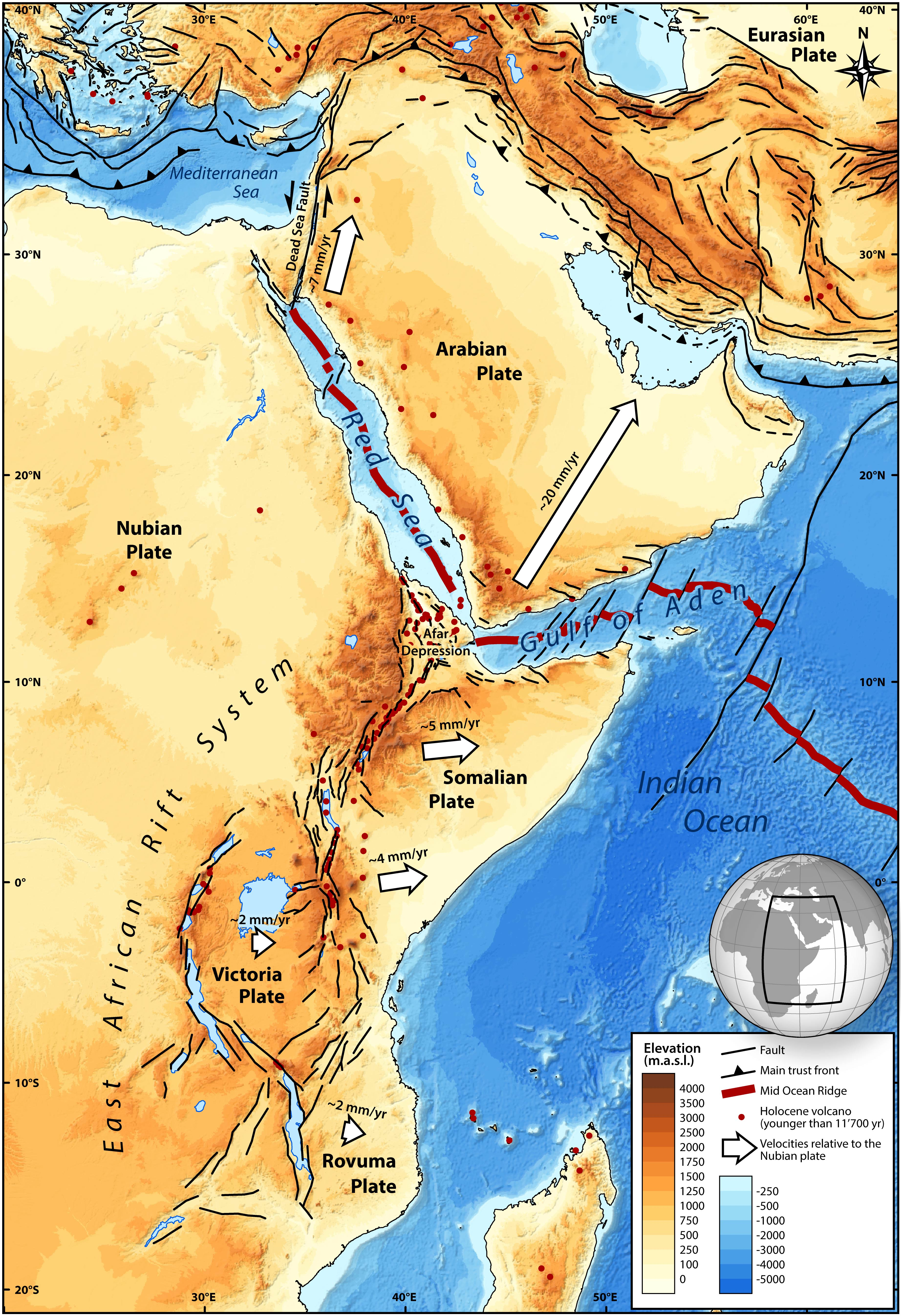
Tectonic map of the African-Arabian Rift System. The Afar Depression is situated at the junction of the Red Sea, the Gulf of Aden, and the East African Rift System

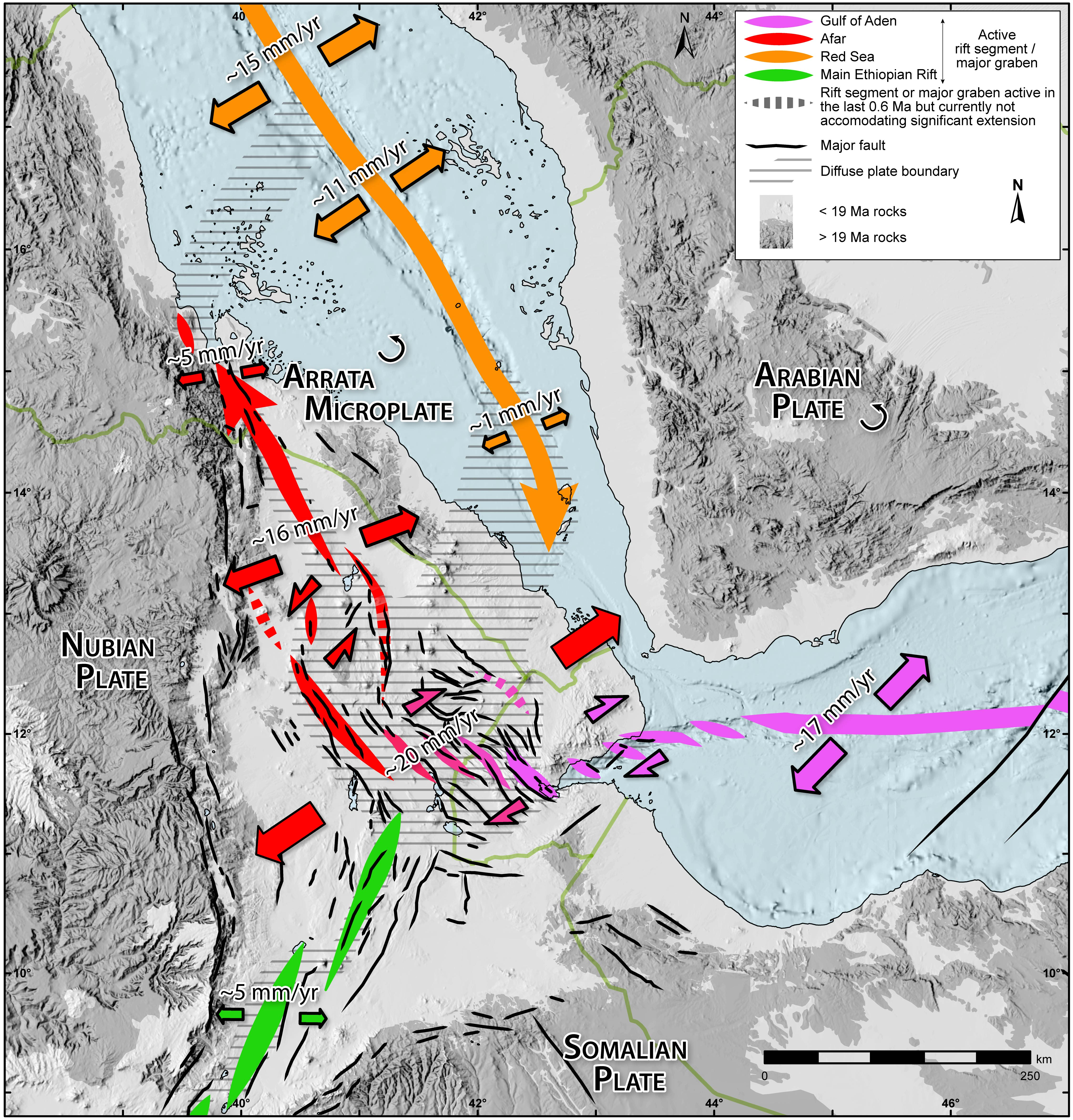
Tectonic map of the Afar Depression showing the small scale plate configuration, the velocities of extension and the active rift segments.

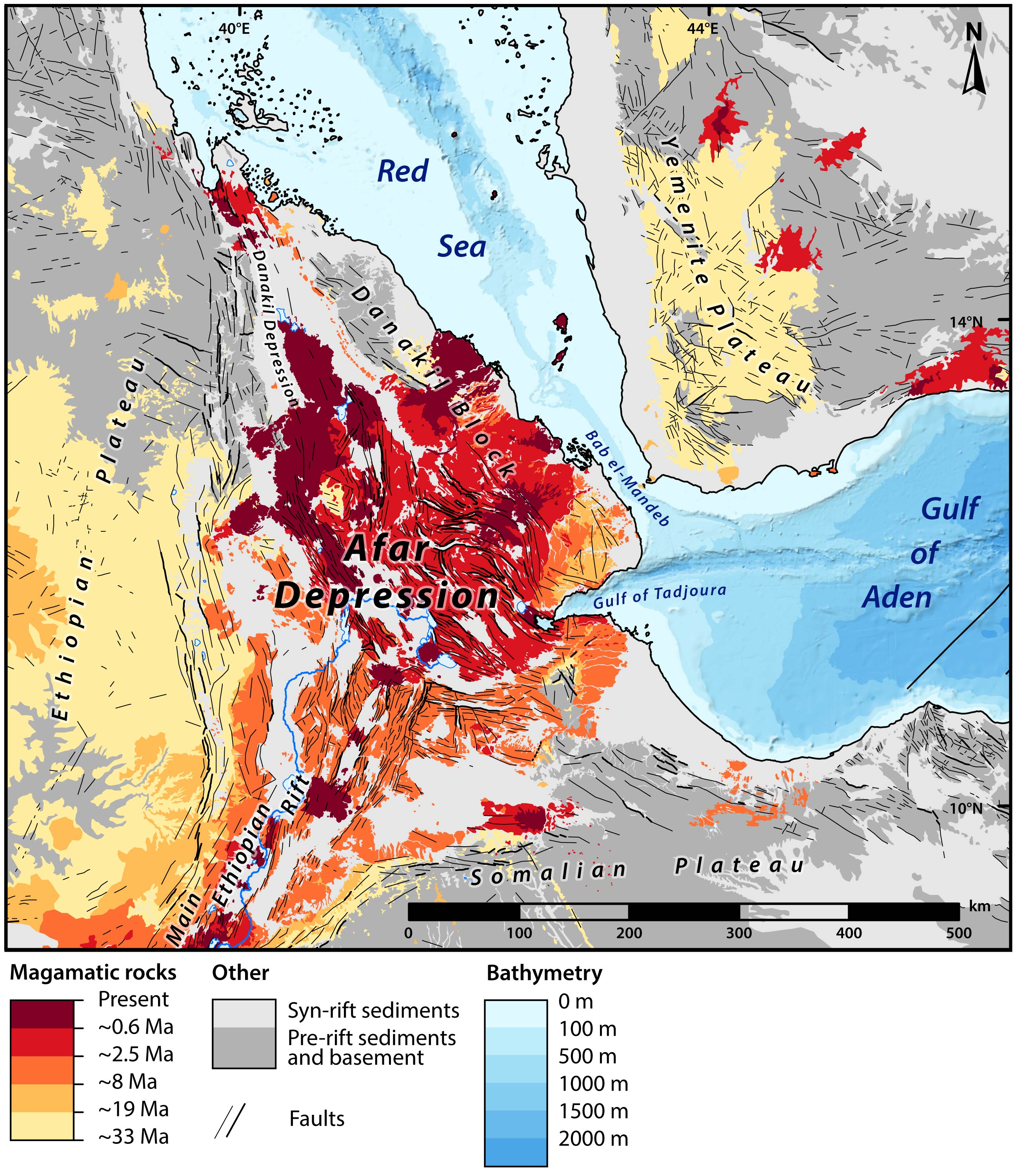
Geological map of the Afar Depression showing the magmatic rocks from old (yellow) to recent (dark red), as well as the fault pattern.

The Afar Depression is a tectonic triple junction (the Afar triple junction), where the spreading ridges of the Red Sea and the Gulf of Aden meet the East African Rift. These rifts are caused by the northeastward movement of the Arabian plate (approximately 20 mm/yr) and the much slower eastward movement of the Somalian plate (approximately 5 mm/yr) relative to the Nubian (African) plate.

At smaller scale, the tectonics of the Afar Depression is more complex. An independent microplate, the Danakil (or Arrata) microplate, is carrying a piece of continental material (the Danakil block) between the Afar and the Red Sea and is rotating counterclockwise, causing the slow propagation of the Afar Rift to the north and the propagation of the Red Sea rift to the south.

The recent geological history of the Afar Depression started around 33 million years ago, before any rifting, with the eruption of the Ethiopian Flood Basalts that covered large parts of Ethiopia and Yemen with hundreds to thousands of meters of volcanic rocks. These eruptions were caused by a hot rising mantle plume that impacted the continental crust and produced large quantities of magma. This impact of the mantle plume also caused the high topography of the region, an effect still visible today.

This volcanic activity weakened the crust and allowed the beginning of the separation between the Arabian plate and the Nubian plate. The Gulf of Aden rift propagated westwards and rifting started in the Afar region approximately 28 million years ago, at the same time as in the southern Red Sea. Between 13 and 8 Ma, a major reorganization of the region took place. The Danakil microplate started rotating, causing the secession of tectonic activity in the southernmost Red Sea, and propagation of the Afar rift in the Danakil Depression (i.e. the northern part of the Afar Triangle). At the same time, the Main Ethiopian Rift (the northernmost part of the East African Rift System) started to form and the Afar Depression became a triple junction. This movement in three different directions by three major plates caused extension and thinning of the crust, explaining the general morphology of the Afar Depression.

During the extension, volcanism remained very important in the Depression, with kilometers of volcanic rocks dominated by basalts emplaced in central Afar. So much magmatic rocks were added to crust, at the surface as lava flows, but also in the crust as intrusions and below the crust as underplated material, that it did not thin as much as expected. This phenomenon is called magma-compensated thinning and it can explain why the central Afar is the only part of the Gulf of Aden - Red Sea system that do not feature normal oceanic crust. Because of this high volcanic activity, some researchers propose that this region might never form a normal ocean, but instead form an oceanic plateau, similar to Iceland.

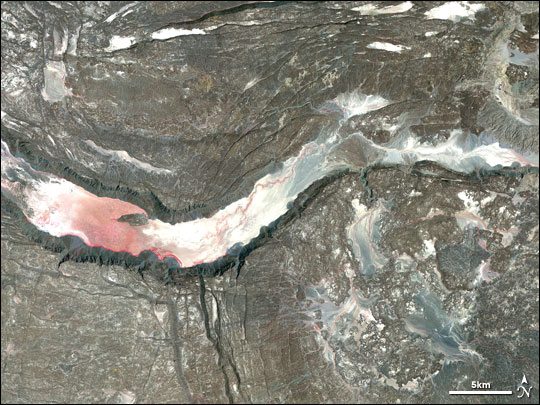
Satellite image of a graben in the Afar Depression.

Volcanic and tectonic activity is still very strong in the Depression. In different regions of the Afar, the extension is accommodated by faulting or magmatic intrusions. The faults form a complex system of horst and graben easily observable on orthophotos thanks to the desertic environment. Magmatic intrusions intrude the crust as dikes that can also erupt at the surface. Both processes cause important earthquakes reaching magnitude 6 and having devastating consequences for the local population. In 2005, an important magmatic and tectonic crisis in Dabbahu caused up to 8 meters of extension along a 60 km rift segment and the intrusion of 2.5 km^{3} of lava in only two weeks. Accounting for an extension rate of approx. 20 mm/yr in the area, 8 m of extension corresponds to the release of 400 years of stress accumulation in the crust.

In the northern part of the Afar Depression, called the Danakil Depression, the volcanic activity was less intense until approx. 0.6 My ago. This allowed the crust to thin more than the central part of the Afar and the topography to reach elevations below sea level. This allowed the Red Sea to invade the Danakil Depression during at least four periods of high sea-level in the Pleistocene. The last flooding happened approx. 130'000 years ago. These flooding are testified by fossil coral reefs and by thick (>500 m) evaporites deposits (mainly halite, i.e. salt) found in the central part of the basin.

Geologists predict that in about 10 million years the whole 6,000 km (3,700 mi) length of the East African Rift will be submerged, forming a new ocean basin as large as today's Red Sea, and separating the Somali plate and the Horn of Africa from the rest of the continent.

== See also ==
- Dallol – Terrestrial hydrothermal system of Danakil Depression in northeastern Ethiopia
- Horst – Raised fault block bounded by normal faults
- Lake Assal – Salt lake below sea level in Djibouti
- List of fossil sites (with link directory)
- List of hominini (hominin) fossils (with images)
- The Afar people – Cushitic ethnic group in the Horn of Africa who inhabit the region
