= Jabal al-Tair Island =

Volcanic island in Red Sea

Jabal at-Tair
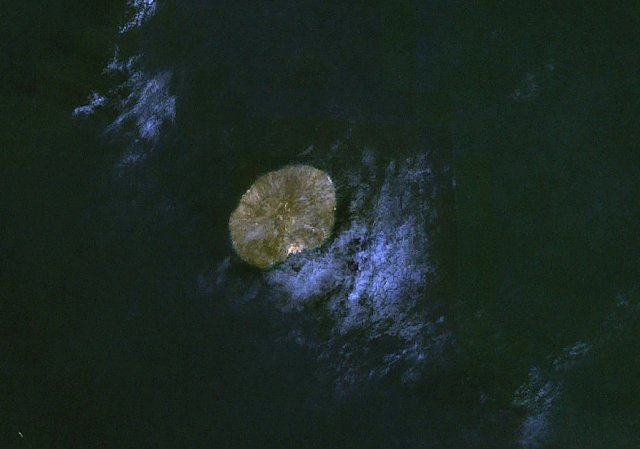
- Landsat 7 image of the island

Highest point
- Elevation: 244 m (801 ft)
- Coordinates: 15.540299°N 41.833826°E

Naming
- English translation: Bird Mountain
- Language of name: Arabic
- Pronunciation: Arabic: [dʒæbæl ɑtˤːɑir]

Geography
- Location: Yemen (Red Sea island)

Geology
- Mountain type: Stratovolcano
- Volcanic zone: Great Rift Valley
- Last eruption: 2007 to 2008

Jabal al-Tair Island (or Jebel Teir, Jabal al-Tayr, Tair Island, Al-Tair Island, Jazirat at-Tair) (Arabic: جزيرة جبل الطير Jazīrat Jabal aṭ-Ṭayr, 'Bird Mountain Island') is a roughly oval volcanic island in Yemen, northwest of the constricted Bab al-Mandab passage at the mouth of the Red Sea, about halfway between mainland Yemen and Eritrea. From 1996 until an eruption in 2007, Yemen maintained two watchtowers and a small military base on the island.

After 124 years of dormancy, the volcano that created the island erupted on 30 September 2007.

== Geography ==
The island is roughly oval, about 4.3 kilometres (2.7 mi) long, 3 kilometres (1.9 mi) across at its widest and 11.48 km^{2} (4.43 sq mi) in area. It lies nearly halfway between Yemen 115 km (71 mi) to the east and Eritrea about 150 km (93 mi) south west. It is about 82 km (51 mi) from the Yemeni Kamaran Island; the Saudi Arabian Farasan Islands lie to the north east.

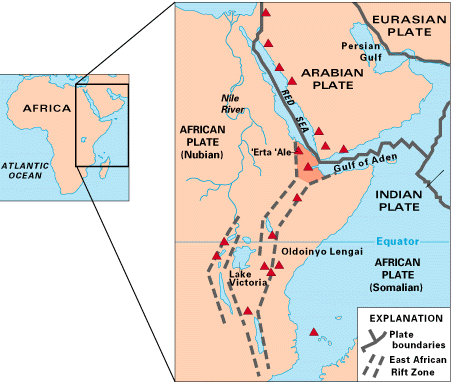
The island lies close to the divergent boundary between the African Plate and the Arabian Plate.

The island comprises the basaltic stratovolcano Jabal al-Tair (Tair Mountain; Arabic: جبل الطير Jabal aṭ-Ṭayr, literally, "Bird Mountain") rising from seabed some 1,200 metres (3,940 ft) below the surface of the Red Sea, continuing for 244 m (801 feet) above the surface up to the summit of the crater. The volcano was wrongly considered "recently extinct" by 1982. It was the northernmost known Holocene volcano in the Red Sea, with one central vent, Jebel Duchan. It lies in the volcanic and geologically active region of the Red Sea Rift, the divergent boundary between the African Plate and the Arabian Plate.

In 1900 the British Admiralty described the island as having no natural water supply, and having a high conical peak rising above a basalt bluff some 300 feet (90 m) above a gradual littoral. The prominent profile made it an ideal landmark for Red Sea shipping, and the steep drop-off below sea level meant that it might be safely run for. The island has no settled population, but some parts of the island have allowed for the seasonal presence of fishermen.

== History ==
In the past, the island, formerly known as Saiban, was an important navigational marker for the shipping lanes that passed nearby. Historically, the Ottoman Empire controlled the Red Sea islands, and granted a French company a lighthouse concession. British forces occupied the island in 1915, but sovereignty was deliberately left indeterminate. After a period of French-British operation the lighthouse concession first passed to a British company, then to Yemen.

Sovereignty of the island was long disputed among Ethiopia, Eritrea, and Yemen. Under a 1962 agreement, lighthouses were maintained on the island at the cost of shippers. In 1973, Yemen had notified Ethiopia of its intent to perform an aerial survey, and an ambiguous response by Ethiopia was later a point of contention; Ethiopia designated the islands in the area as having "no recognized owner". The dispute, after Eritrea's 1993 independence from Ethiopia, erupted into the 1995 Hanish islands crisis regarding the Hanish Islands and Zuqar Island. A 1998-99 international case at the Permanent Court of Arbitration awarded various islands to Eritrea and Yemen respectively.

Yemen maintained a military base on the island from the dispute with Eritrea in 1996 until the 2007 eruption. There are or were two watchtowers for control and observation of the large warships, cargo ships, and oil tankers that pass by.

== 2007 eruption ==
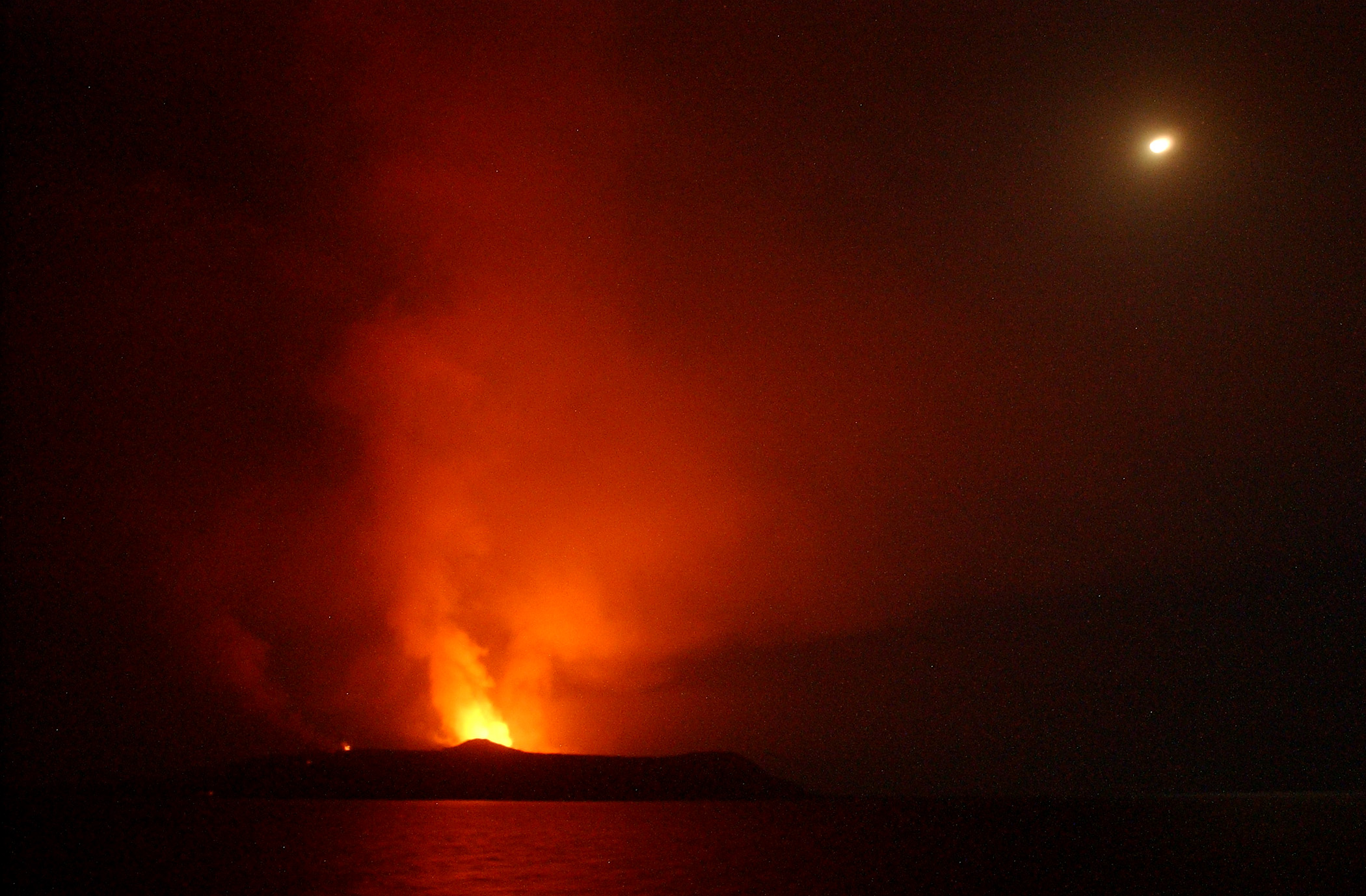
Eruption, observed from the USS Bainbridge

The volcano erupted at 7 p.m. local time on 30 September 2007, throwing lava and ash hundreds of meters into the air. Subsequently, at least one stream of lava was seen flowing down into the sea. It was reported that 29 Yemeni soldiers (around 50 according to one report) were evacuated from the island shortly before the eruption, but 8 were unaccounted for. Several bodies were recovered from the water. It was reported that the western part of the island, where the military base was, had collapsed.

Yemeni authorities requested help from a nearby NATO naval force, and the nearest ship, a United States Naval vessel USS Bainbridge, was reported to be aiding the Yemeni coastguard. Other ships from NATO Standing NRF Maritime Group 1 assisted in the rescue and recovery effort, including HMCS Toronto; the Bainbridge and Toronto each rescued one survivor. The Portuguese frigate NRP Álvares Cabral and the Dutch frigate HNLMS Evertsen were first on the scene. Both survivors were rescued after over 20 hours in the water, just as the task force was preparing to conclude its search. A Canadian officer described a "spectacular backdrop of erupting lava and shooting flames" faced by search parties in small boats.

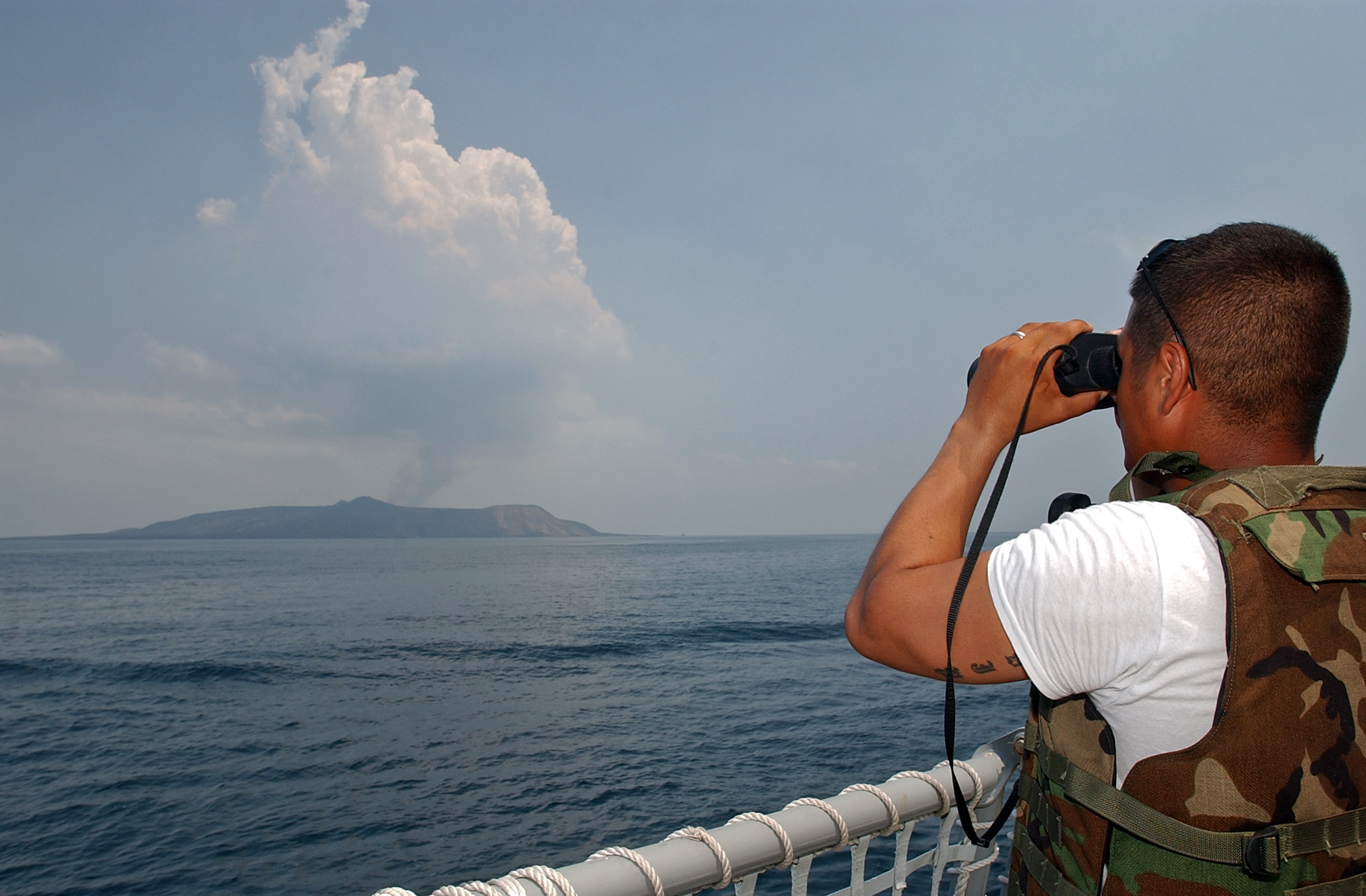
Eruption, observed from the USS Bainbridge

Several minor earthquakes ranging from 2 to 3.6 on the moment magnitude scale were reported near the island in the two weeks before the eruption.

Earlier documented eruptions of this volcano include several reported in the 18th and 19th centuries, the most recent (before 2007) in 1883, and possibly one in 1332. A Yemeni government geologist expected the volcano to "take time to calm down", but shipping, including tankers carrying 3 million barrels of oil, that passed through the Red Sea daily, had not been affected. In December 2007 it was reported that volcanic activity on the island had increased and fishermen were warned to avoid the area.

== See also ==
- List of islands of Yemen
