= Hula basin =

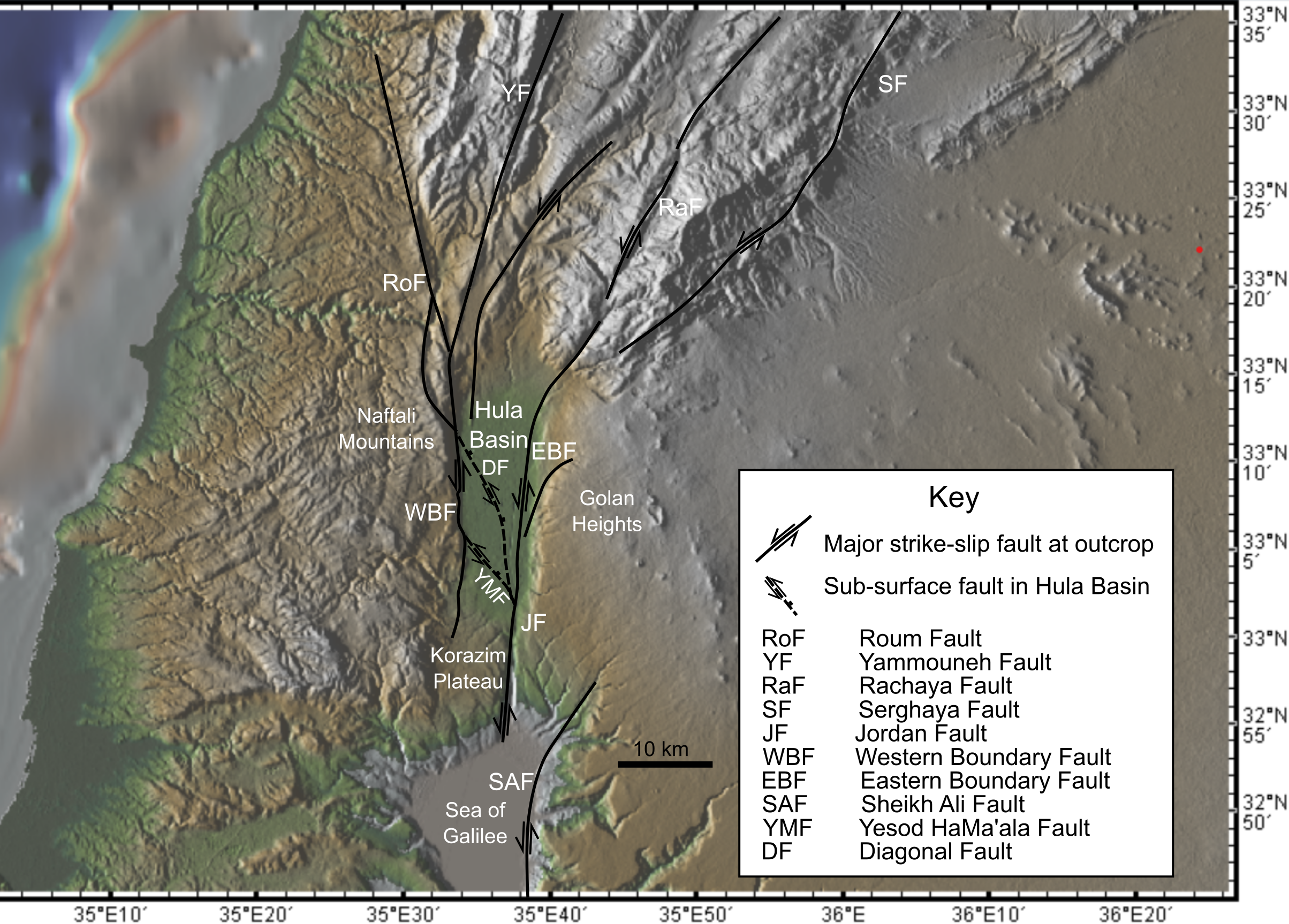
Tectonic setting of the Hula Basin on hill-shaded topographic base

The Hula basin is a sedimentary basin in northern Israel, created by lateral movement on segments of Dead Sea Transform fault zone. The basin is bounded on its western and eastern sides by steep fault zones. The fault to the west, the Hula Western Border fault, continues northwards, splitting into the Roum and Yammouneh faults. The fault to the east, the Eastern Border Fault, continues southwards as the Jordan fault. The basin's fill reaches a maximum of about 3,500 m. The basin has been part-filled by a lake until the recent past, although it is now the Hula Valley, with only remnants of the lake left.

== Tectonic setting ==
The Hula basin is a pull-apart basin formed at an extensional fault stepover on the left-lateral Dead Sea Transform, which forms the transform plate boundary between the African plate to the west and the Arabian plate to the east. The transform began to form when rifting in the Gulf of Suez Rift slowed, during the Early to Middle Miocene. A set of faults began to form that propagated northwards along the line of what is now the Jordan Valley, reaching as far as the Sea of Galilee. Further displacement during the Late Miocene was accommodated mainly by shortening within the Palmyra fold belt. The transform propagated north again during the Early Pliocene through the SW–NE trending Lebanon Restraining Bend as the Yammouneh Fault.

== Geometry ==
The internal geometry of the basin is known from limited seismic reflection data (175 km total line length) and several boreholes that penetrated more than 500 m, with the deepest penetration (Notera 3) being to 2785 m. The dominant faults are the south–north trending western and eastern boundary faults, although there is evidence of diagonal, northwest–southeast trending faults. The Yesod HaMa'ala fault has a topographic expression, marking the southwestern edge of the former Hula lake and has been interpreted as the current southern boundary to the basin. An additional NNW–SSE trending diagonal fault has been interpreted to cross the whole basin, active since the mid Pleistocene.

== Basin fill ==
The fill of the Hula basin consists of lacustrine sediments, including marl, chalk and freshwater limestone, with peat and lignite, interbedded with clastic sediments, sandstone and conglomerate. The sequence also includes several volcanic units, at least nine of which have been recognised in the Notera-3 well. Most of these basalt layers have been dated radiometrically, giving ages ranging from about 8.8 million years ago (mya) to 1.1 mya. The youngest of the basalts in the well is the Hazbani basalt, which outcrops to the north of the basin. It is recognised in many of the deeper boreholes and is an important seismic horizon on the seismic reflection data.
