= Ghab basin =

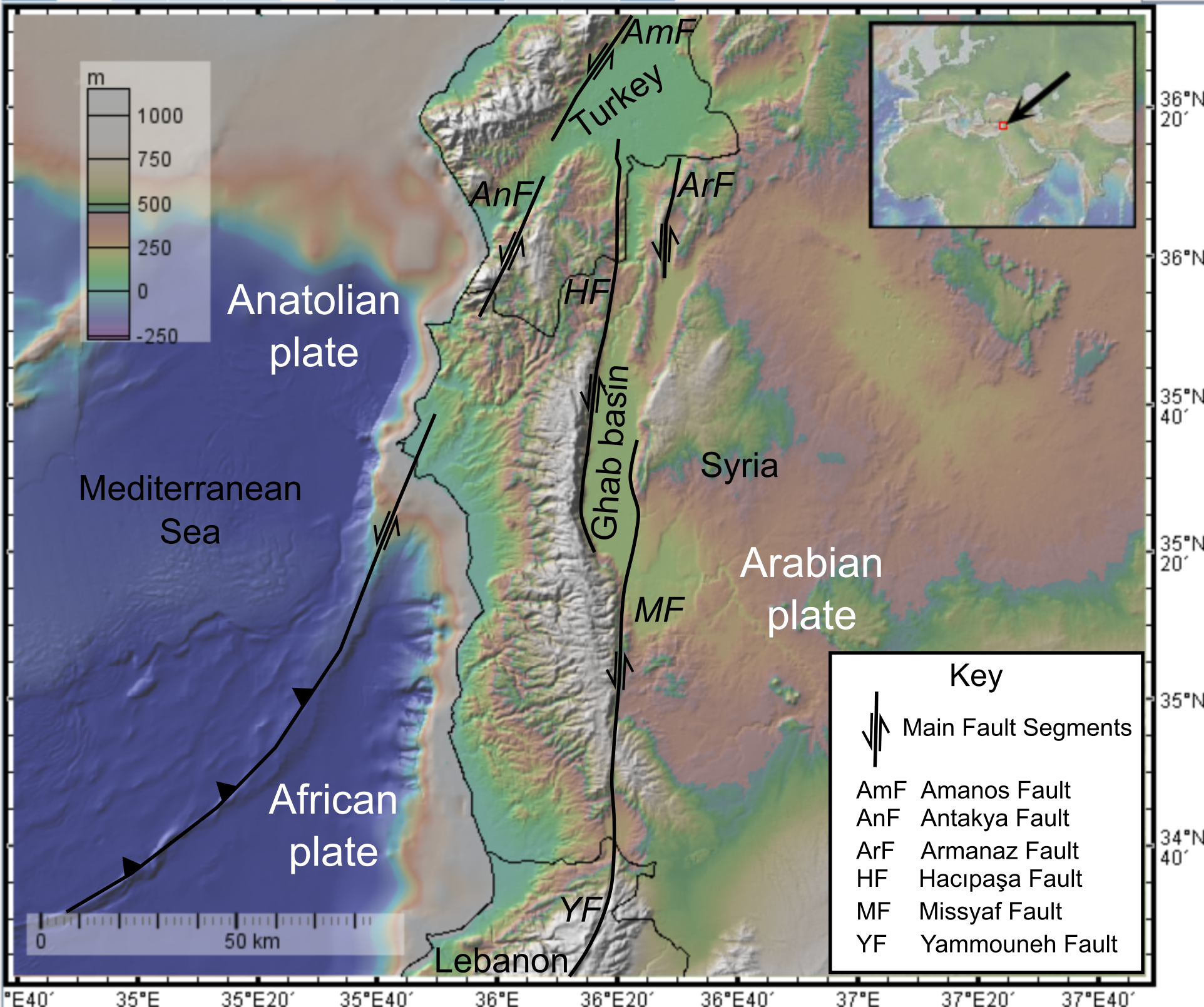
Map showing tectonic setting of the Ghab basin

The Ghab basin or Al-Ghab basin is a sedimentary basin in western Syria that lies beneath the Ghab Plain. It is developed between two of the main fault strands of the Dead Sea Transform (DST), the Missyaf fault to the south extending along its eastern flank and the Hacıpaşa fault to the north extending along its western flank. The left-stepping offset between these two faults has produced local transtension, creating a pull-apart basin. Based on the interpretation of limited seismic reflection data and a single hydrocarbon exploration borehole, the basin is understood to be filled by up to 3,400 m of Pliocene to recent sediments.

== Tectonic setting ==
The basin is developed within the northern part of the Dead Sea Transform, the left lateral strike-slip fault zone that forms the boundary between the Arabian plate and the African plate. The transform began to form when rifting in the Gulf of Suez Rift slowed, during the Early to Middle Miocene. A set of faults began to form that propagated northwards along the line of what is now the Jordan Valley, reaching as far as the Sea of Galilee. Further displacement during the Late Miocene was accommodated mainly by shortening within the Palmyra fold belt. The transform propagated north again during the Early Pliocene through the SW–NE trending Lebanon Restraining Bend as the Yammouneh Fault, before continuing north along the Missyaf Fault and the Hacıpaşa Fault.

== Characteristics ==
The basin is bounded to east and west by the two steep strike-slip fault segments of the DST. The basin floor is cut by several faults of normal to normal=oblique character, defining a central ridge trending approximately west-east. To the south of this high is the deepest part of the basin, reaching an estimated 3.4 km depth. This depocentre is asymmetric, with the deepest part to the eastern side, against the Missyaf fault. To the north of the ridge, is a second smaller depocentre, with the deepest part to the western side against the Hacıpaşa fault.

The basin fill consists mainly of Pliocene to Quaternary lacustrine deposits, including clays, marls silts and pebble layers. There is also a minor clastic component of sandstones and conglomerates interbedded with the lacustrine sequence.
