= Gawis cranium =

Hominin fossil

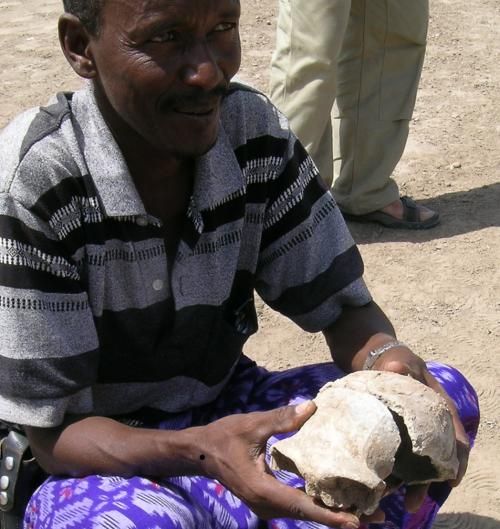
- The Gawis cranium shortly after it was discovered
- Common name: Gawis cranium
- Species: Homo erectus/Homo sapiens/Homo heidelbergensis
- Age: 200,000 - 500,000
- Place discovered: Ethiopia
- Date discovered: February 16, 2006
- Discovered by: Asahmed Humet

The Gawis cranium is a portion of a fossil hominin skull discovered on February 16, 2006, near the drainage of Gawis, a tributary of the Awash River in the Afar Depression, Ethiopia. Despite the presence of volcanic ash layers that are key to dating, the cranium is only generally dated between 200,000 and 500,000 years ago due to taphonomic issues.

The 2006 discovery was reported by Sileshi Semaw, director of the Gona Project, which is based at the Stone Age Institute and Indiana University Bloomington's CRAFT research center.

== Discovery and significance ==
The hominin skull was discovered by Asahmed Humet, a member of the Gona Paleoanthropological Research Project; he found the recently resurfaced fossil in a small erosion gully that empties into the Gawis river drainage basin in the Afar Region, some 300 miles northeast of Addis Ababa. The skull is a nearly complete cranium of what is believed to be a Middle Pleistocene human ancestor. While different from a modern human, the braincase, upper face and jaw of the cranium have unmistakable anatomical evidence that belong to human ancestry. The discovery was reported by Sileshi Semaw, director of the Gona Project at the Stone Age Institute. Semaw noted the skull fossil could be a transitional form that fills a gap in human evolutionary origins. He described its appearance as intermediate between Homo erectus and Homo sapiens.

Significant archaeological collections of stone tools and numerous fossil animal specimens were also found at the site.

Gawis is in the Gona Research Project study area situated in the Awash River Valley. Immediately to the east of Gona, also located along the Awash and one of its tributaries is the site of Hadar, where in 1974 U.S. scientist Donald Johanson found the 3.2-million-year-old remains of an Australopithecus afarensis, known as Lucy. The Middle Awash project, site of many other hominin discoveries, is to the south.

In addition to the Gawis cranium, the Gona project area has yielded some of the world's oldest stone tools (2.6 million years old), as well as fossils of Ardipithecus ramidus—hominid, and debated as whether or not hominin—dated to approximately 4.5 million years ago.

== See also ==
- Human evolution
- List of fossil sites (with link directory)
- List of hominini (hominin) fossils (with images)
