= Gulf of Suez Rift =

Ancient geological rift

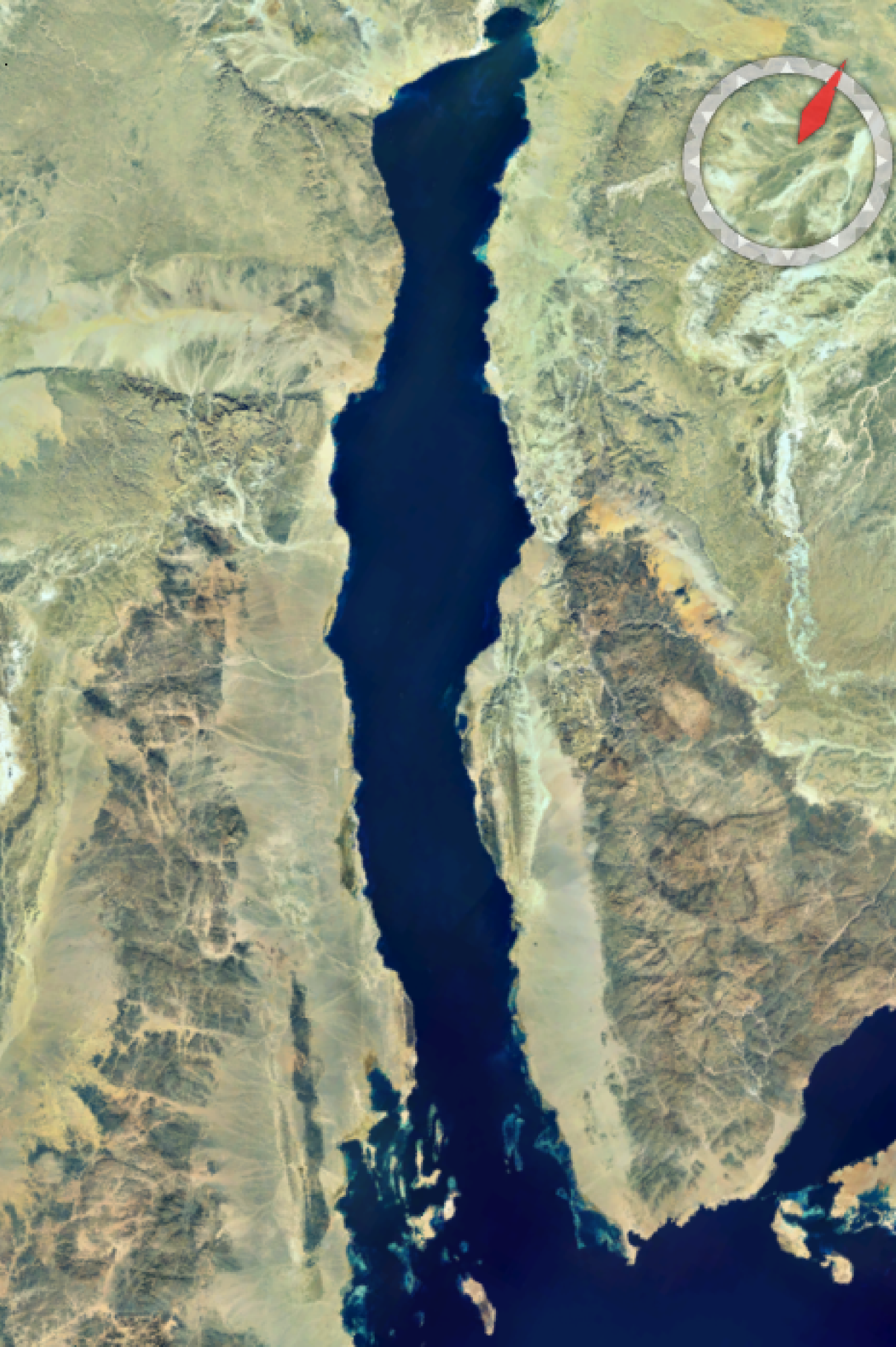
Satellite image of the Gulf of Suez, dark outcrops of the Precambrian Arabian-Nubian Shield and linear rift structures are clearly visible on both sides of the gulf

The Gulf of Suez Rift is a continental rift zone that was active between the Late Oligocene (c. 28 Ma) and the end of the Miocene (c. 5 Ma). It represented a continuation of the Red Sea Rift until break-up occurred in the middle Miocene, with most of the displacement on the newly developed Red Sea spreading centre being accommodated by the Dead Sea Transform. During its brief post-rift history, the deepest part of the remnant rift topography has been filled by the sea, creating the Gulf of Suez.

North of the Gulf of Suez the rift becomes indistinct and its exact geometry uncertain, linking eventually to the Manzala rift beneath the Nile Delta.

== Plate tectonic setting ==
The formation of the Red Sea – Gulf of Suez rift system was caused by the anticlockwise rotation of the Arabian plate with respect to the African plate. This model is consistent with near orthogonal rifting along the entire length of the rift system. Alternative models that suggest initiation by strike-slip faulting and pull-apart basin development along the axis of the rift have not been supported by detailed studies of the rift geometry.

Towards the end of the Miocene, the Arabian plate began to collide with the Eurasian plate leading to changes in the plate configuration, the development of the Dead Sea Transform and cessation in rifting in the Gulf of Suez.

== Stratigraphy ==
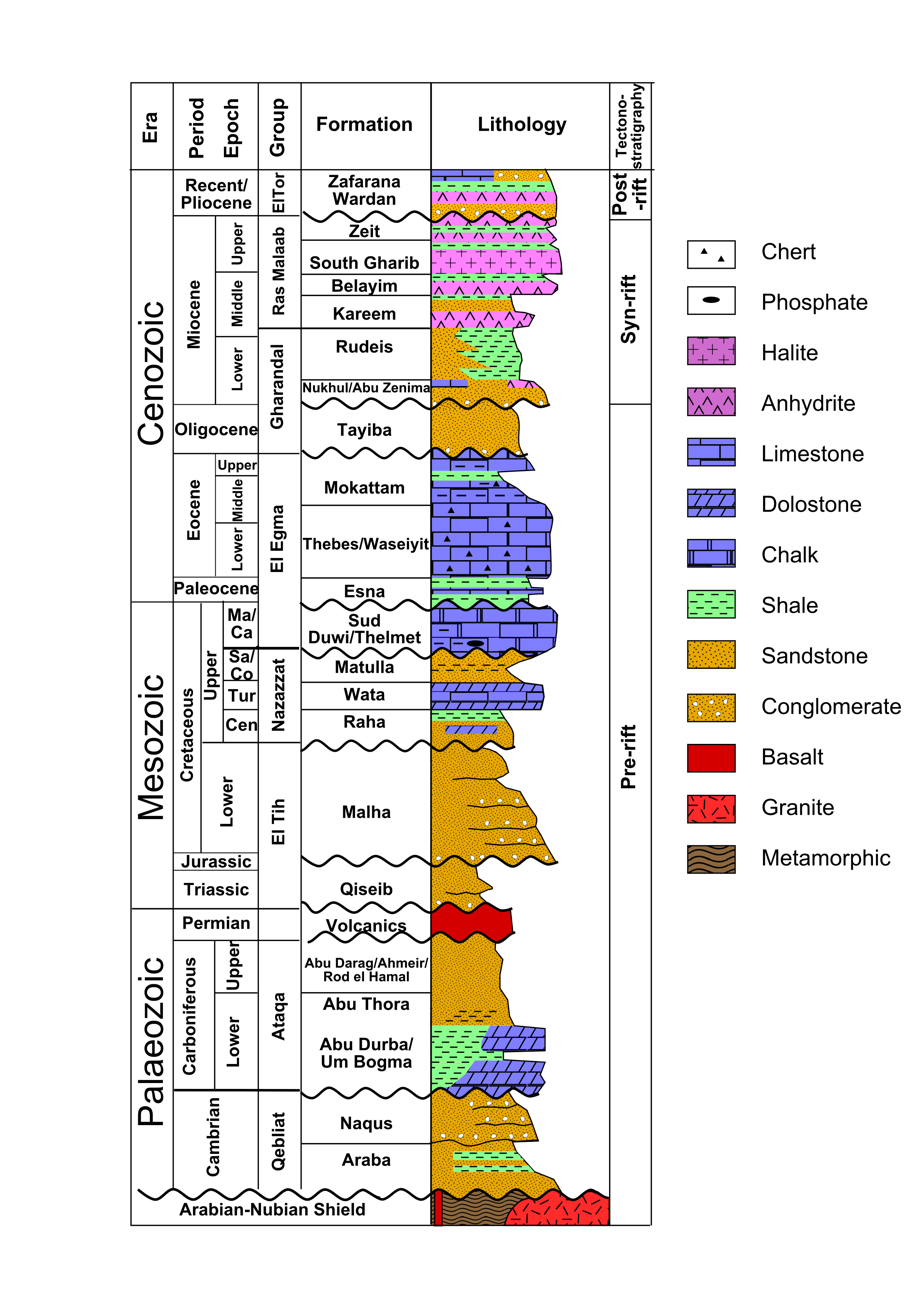
Stratigraphy of the Gulf of Suez rift

=== Basement ===
The basement consists of Precambrian rocks of the Arabian-Nubian Shield. Gneisses, volcanics and metasediments are intruded by granites, granodiorites and a suite of dolerite dykes. These rocks contain shear zones, such as the Rehba Shear Zone of western Sinai, that are interpreted to have partly controlled the orientation and location of rift structures.

=== Palaeozoic ===
Cambrian rocks of Araba and Naqus Formations occur throughout the region above a planar unconformity, a result of peneplaination. These red and white sandstone units have a combined thickness of about 500 m. They were deposited in a continental environment except in the northeastern part of the gulf where they become marine. The next preserved sequence is the Umm Bogma or Abu Durba Formations of lower Carboniferous age, which sit apparently conformably on the Cambrian, although the base represents a hiatus of about 150 Ma. The Umm Bogma Formation is dolomitic, while the stratigraphically equivalent Abur Durba Formation consists of black shales and mudstones. These sequences then pass up into the sandstones of the Abu Thora Formation. In the northern Gulf, at Wadi Araba, the early Carboniferous is overlain by upper Carboniferous of the Rod e Hamal, Abu Darag and Ahmeir Formations. In the southern Gulf the Carboniferous strata are capped by Permian volcanics.

=== Mesozoic ===
The Qiseib Formation is found throughout the Gulf varying in thickness between 8 m and 300 m. It is thought to be mainly Triassic in age, although it is considered to include Permian strata near its base near Wadi Araba. The Qiseib Formation consists of sandstones, conglomeratic at the base with an overall fining upward trend.

The Qiseib Formation is overlain by the sandstones of the Malha Formation of upper Jurassic to lower Cretaceous age. These sandstones are up to 400 m in thickness, form an important reservoir in the Gulf of Suez and are known informally as the 'Nubian' sandstone.

The upper Cretaceous sequence consists of shallow marine deposits that generally thicken northwards. The Cenomanian Raha Formation, a sequence of interbedded shales limestones and sandstone, is succeeded by limestones of the Turonian Wata Formation. This is overlain by sandstones and shales of the Coniacian-Santonian age Matullah Formation. The central and northern parts of the gulf were locally affected by a phase of inversion at the end of the Santonian. Structures such as Wadi Araba became uplifted at this time giving rise to folding and local erosion of pre-Campanian strata. The Campanian Duwi Formation, known as the Brown Limestone, was deposited throughout the gulf apart from the uplifted area of the North Galala plateau and Wadi Araba where it is replaced by chalk of the Thelmet Formation. These pass up into Sudr Formation chalks of Maastrichtian age. On the southern margin of the uplifted Wadi Araba, a carbonate ramp sequence was formed during the Campanian/Maastrichtian, continuing into the Paleogene.

=== Cenozoic ===
Rocks of Paleocene age are represented by the Esna Shale Formation which overlies the Sudr Formation. This is succeeded by Eocene age limestones of either the Thebes or Waseiyit Formations. Together with the middle to late Eocene Mokattam Formation this sequence reaches a combined maximum thickness of 500 m. These limestones are followed by continental to locally shallow marine red sandstones of the Tayiba Formation, which represent the last of the pre-rift deposits.

The continental sandstones and siltstones of the Abu Zenima Formation represent the earliest syn-rift deposits of late Oligocene (Chattian) to early Miocene (Aquitanian) age. Locally the Abu Zenima Formation is capped by basalts. The lower Miocene age conglomerates, sandstones and marls of the Nukhul Formation were deposited in shallow marine conditions as the sea began to flood the developing rift. The Nukhul Formation overlies the Abu Zenima Formation in some place but elsewhere is probably age equivalent, reflecting a diachronous change to marine conditions within the rift.

The deepening of the rift is recorded by the lower Miocene Rudeis Formation. The lower part, consisting of marls and sandstones, is overlain by coarse sandstones and conglomerates reflecting a rapid increase in rift topography at that time. The Kareem Formation saw the first development of evaporites, indicating basin restriction, followed by open marine shales, as coarse clastic deposition began to reduce in the middle Miocene. Shales, anhydrite, halite and reefal limestones of the uppermost middle Miocene Belayim lie unconformably on the Kareem. More restricted basin conditions continued with the upper Miocene South Gharib and Zeit Formations with deposition of halite with some anhydrite and mudstone, representing the last syn-rift deposits.

The Pliocene–Recent postrift sequence reaches up to 2000 m in thickness in the southern part of the rift and is formed of interbedded sandstones, limestones and evaporites.

== History ==
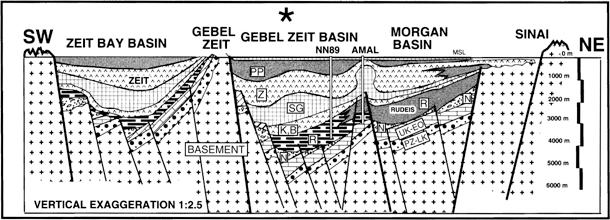
Generalised structural cross-section through the Gulf of Suez, just south of the Morgan Accommodation Zone. PZ-LK = Paleozoic to lower Cretaceous Nubia (reservoir rock); UK-EO = Upper Cretaceous to Eocene pre-rift carbonate (source rock); N, R, K, and B = syn- and post-rift Nukhul, Rudeis, Kareem and Belayim formation (sources, reservoirs, seals and overburden); SG = South Gharib salt (seal and overburden); Z=Zeit (seals and overburden); and PP = Plio-Pleistocene (overburden)

=== Pre-rift ===
During the Late Cretaceous to Eocene, the area now occupied by the rift was a shallow sea depositing carbonates. This period was mainly quiet tectonically but the northern part of the gulf region was affected by periodic far-field effects of the Alpine orogeny. A series of WSW-ENE trending extensional basins were inverted, creating isolated uplifted and folded areas known as Syrian Arc structures. These structures were mainly active during the Late Santonian but there is evidence of further movements on the same structures at the end of the Cretaceous and during the Paleogene.

=== Rifting ===
Rifting began along the whole of the Red Sea -Gulf of Suez rift system during the Late Oligocene. In the Gulf of Suez rift, the rifting culminated during the Burdigalian stage (late Early Miocene, c. 18 Ma). In the Middle Miocene break-up occurred along the whole length of the Red Sea rift with seafloor spreading beginning in the Late Miocene. This break-up was associated with a gradual reduction in the rate of rifting along the Gulf of Suez with most activity stopping by the beginning of the Pliocene.

=== Post-rift ===
Since the end of the Miocene the area of the Gulf of Suez rift has begun to experience post-rift thermal subsidence accompanied by flooding of the topographically lowest parts of the rift.

== Geometry ==
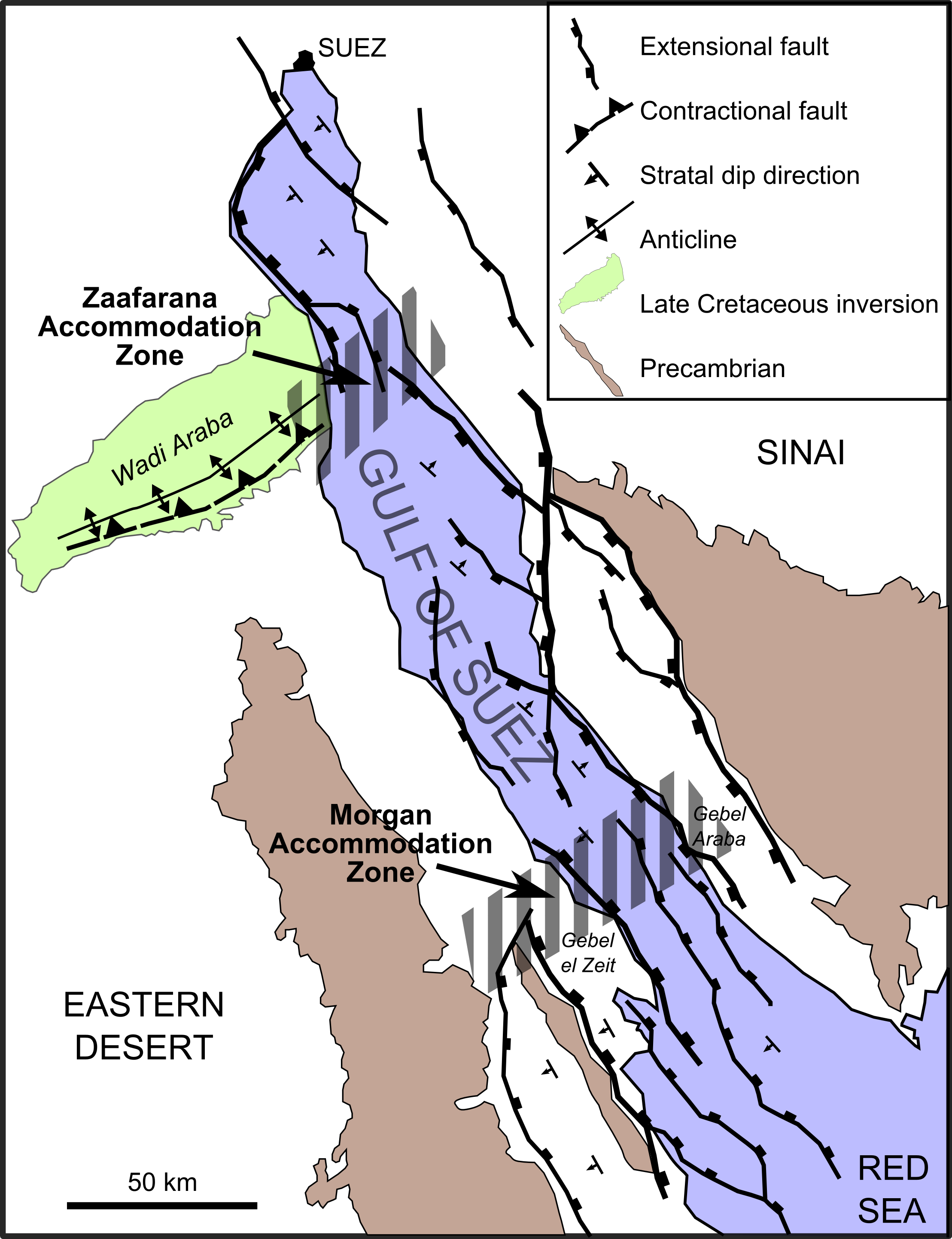
Structural map of the Gulf of Suez rift

The Gulf of Suez rift is strongly segmented along its length with half-grabens of alternating polarity. The changes in fault polarity and position from segment to segment are taken up by broad accommodation zones.

=== Zaafarana accommodation zone ===
This zone, also known as the Galala-Abu Zenima Accommodation Zone, marks a change in fault polarity from NE-dipping in the Darag Basin to the north to SE-dipping to the south in the Belayim province. It coincides with the location of the Cretaceous inversion structure, the Wadi Araba anticline. It has been suggested that the presence of this structure acted as a barrier to northward propagation of the rift. Its location may also be partly controlled by the Rehba Shear Zone in the underlying basement.

=== Morgan accommodation zone ===
The Morgan accommodation zone marks a switch in fault polarity from NE-dipping to the north to SW-dipping to the south in the Amal-Zeit province. It also coincides with a marked southward widening of the rift zone. There is no earlier structure known that influenced the location of this accommodation zone.

== Economic importance ==
More than 120 hydrocarbon fields and discoveries have been reported from the Gulf of Suez rift with a variety of petroleum plays.

=== Source rocks ===
The main source rock in the Gulf of Suez is the Campanian age Brown Limestone or Duwi Member of the Sudr Formation. This unit is typically 25–70 m thick and is distributed from the southern end of the gulf as far north as Wadi Araba. It contains mainly type II kerogen and has an average Total organic carbon content (TOC) of 2.6 wt% with some samples measuring up to 21 wt%. In the southern part of the gulf, the Miocene source intervals become important as higher geothermal gradients cause parts of the syn-rift sequence to reach maturity. Marine shale of the middle Miocene Magna Formation is the most important of these younger source rocks with a TOC ranging from 1–2 wt %.

=== Reservoir rocks ===
The best quality reservoir in the Gulf of Suez is the mainly Lower Cretaceous Malha Formation, sometimes known as the 'Nubia' or 'Nubian A'. This pre-rift sequence is present throughout the gulf, and has porosities in the range 13–29% with permeabilities varying from 70 to 400 md.

=== Main plays ===
The dominant play type in the Gulf of Suez is tilted fault blocks with pre-rift Early Cretaceous sands sealed by syn-rift sequences and source from the Duwi limestone. Additional discoveries have been made in a wide range of structural, stratigraphic and combined play types.

=== Importance as a rift basin analogue ===
The Gulf of Suez rift has been intensively studied by academic groups and by companies as analogue for rift basins in general. This is due to the generally good exposure within the onshore part of the rift coupled with the availability of hydrocarbon exploration wells and seismic reflection datasets within the gulf itself.

== See also ==
- Isthmus of Suez
- Sinai Peninsula
