= Aden Ridge =

Rift portion in Gulf of Aden

Coordinates: 14°N 52°E

Aden-Sheba Ridge

The Aden Ridge is a part of an active oblique rift system located in the Gulf of Aden, between Somalia and the Arabian Peninsula to the north. The rift system marks the divergent boundary between the Somali and Arabian tectonic plates, extending from the Owen transform fault in the Arabian Sea to the Afar triple junction or Afar Plume beneath the Gulf of Tadjoura in Djibouti.

The Gulf of Aden is divided east to west into three distinct regions by large-scale discontinuities, the Socotra, Alula Fartak, and Shukra-El Sheik transform faults. Located in the central region, bounded by the Alula Fartak fault and Shukra-El Sheik fault, is the Aden spreading ridge. The Aden Ridge connects to the Sheba Ridge in the eastern region and to the Tadjoura Ridge in the western region. Due to oblique nature of the Aden Ridge, it is highly segmented. Along the ridge there are seven transform faults that offset it to the north.

== Initiation of rifting ==
Extension of the Gulf of Aden rift system began in the late Eocene – early Oligocene (~35 Ma ago), caused by the northeast escape of the Arabian plate from the African plate at a rate of ~2 cm/yr, and the development of the Afar plume. Extension eventually gave way to seafloor spreading, first initiated near the Owen transform fault ~18 Ma ago. Seafloor spreading then propagated as far west as the Shukra-El Sheik fault at a rate of ~14 cm/yr ~6 Ma ago rifting propagated west of the Shukra-El Sheik fault until terminating at the Afar plume. The Afar plume is believed to have contributed to the initiation of the Aden ridge, due to the flow of hot mantle material being channeled along the thin lithosphere beneath the Gulf of Aden. Currently, the Aden Ridge is undergoing extension at a rate of ~15 mm/yr.

== Segmentation of the Aden Ridge ==
Compared to its neighboring ridges, the Aden ridge is much more segmented. The Aden Ridge is broken up by seven transform faults with ridge segments of 10 – 40 km. In contrast, the Sheba Ridge is broken by only three transform faults and the Tadjoura Ridge continues essentially uninterrupted to the Afar Plume. Sauter et al. (2001) proposed that variations in the spacing of spreading cells along ridges is a result of spreading rate; i.e., larger spacing results from slower spreading rates. However, the variation in spreading rates across the Gulf of Aden, 18 mm/yr in the east and 13 mm/yr in the west, is not great enough to explain the significant variation in spreading cell length between the Aden ridge and its neighboring ridges. One likely cause for the segmentation of the Aden ridge is its distance from the Afar plume. The westernmost region of the Gulf, where the Tadjoura Ridge is located, has an anomalously high mantle temperature due to its proximity to the Afar plume. The result of this is higher degrees of melting and magmatism below the ridge, which allows for longer spreading segments without transform faults. The difference in segmentation between the Aden and Sheba ridges can be explained by varying degrees of obliquity. The ocean-continent transition (OCT) of the Sheba ridge formed parallel to the syn-rift structure, whereas the OCT of the Aden ridge formed oblique to the syn-rift structure. The former scenario is more accommodating to oblique spreading and does not require as many transform faults for stability.
