= Red Sea Rift =

Oceanic rift between the African and Arabian plates

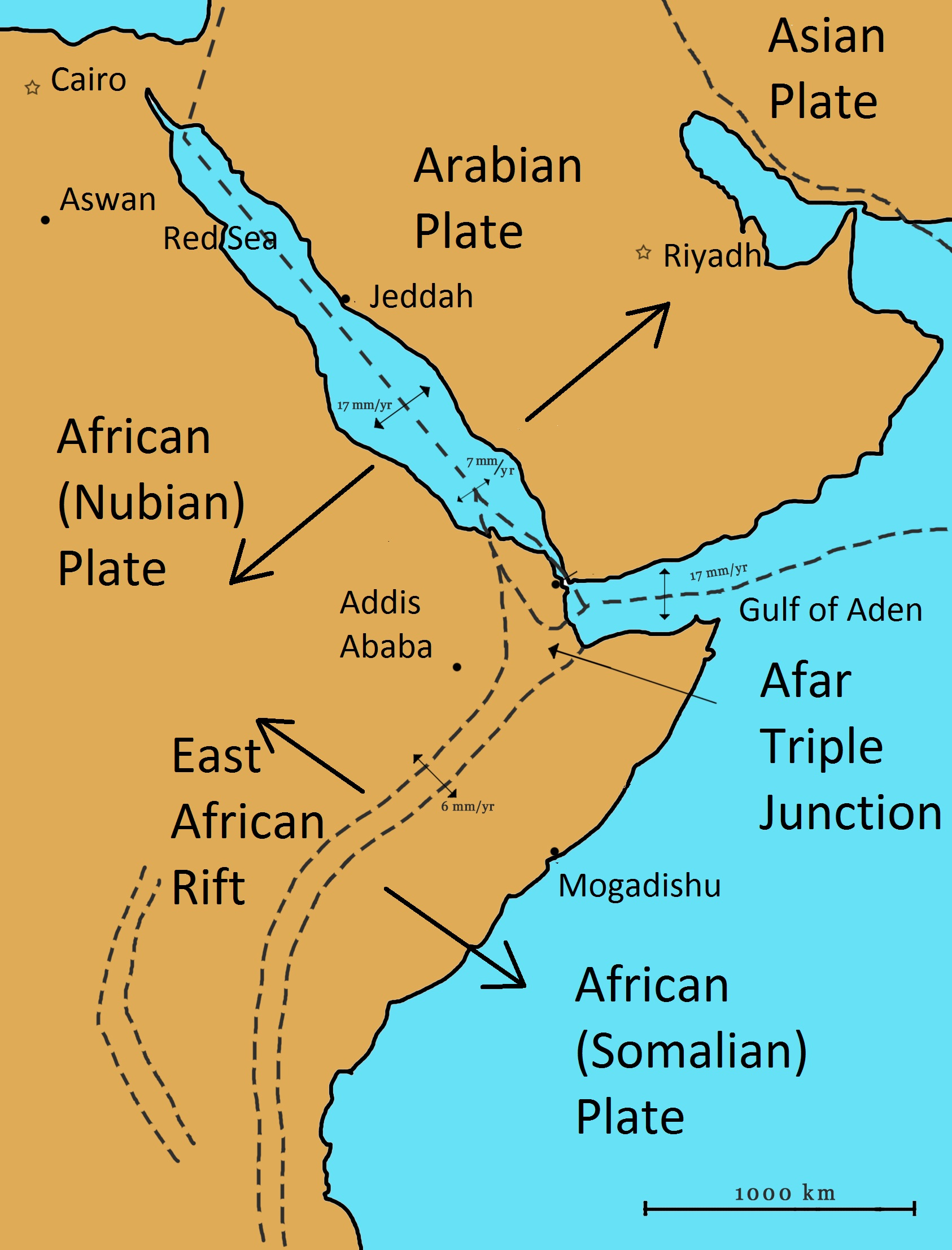
Red Sea Rift between the African (Nubian) Plate and the Arabian plate

The Red Sea Rift is a mid-ocean ridge between two tectonic plates, the African plate and the Arabian plate. It extends from the Dead Sea Transform fault system, and ends at an intersection with the Aden Ridge and the East African Rift, forming the Afar triple junction in the Afar Depression of the Horn of Africa.

The Red Sea Rift was formed by the divergence between the African and Arabian plates. The rift transitioned from a continental rift to an oceanic rift. Magnetic anomalies suggest that the spreading rate on either side of the Red Sea is about 1 cm/year. The African plate has a rotation rate of 0.9270 degrees/Ma (million years), while the Arabian plate has a rotation rate of 1.1616 degrees/Ma.

== Spreading model ==
A two-stage spreading model explains the tectonic evolution in this region. The first major rift motion was seen in the lower/middle Eocene, followed by major seafloor spreading in the late Eocene and early Oligocene. This was followed by a period of 30 Ma of no motion, during which a large amount of evaporites were deposited. After this quiet period of deposition, a new period of activity started about five million years ago. This new phase of spreading caused considerable disturbance to the sediments that were deposited, which created an unstable situation as the crust and sediments parted and the axial trough evolved. Normal faulting along the rift valley during earthquakes shows that the extensional motion is continuing.

== Mechanism of rifting ==
A three-step process has been proposed for the mechanism of rifting.

First, a thermal anomaly developed in the mantle in the earliest stages of rifting, causing the rise of the asthenosphere and the thinning of the subcrustal continental lithosphere. There have been several mechanisms proposed to achieve this, such as convective thermal thinning.

This was followed by decompressions, which occurred due to uplift related to the gradual stretching and thinning of the crust as rifting continued. Stretching and thinning can take place either according to a symmetrical, pure shear, extension model, or due to an asymmetric, detachment-delamination model. Basaltic dykes are also injected during the stretching and thinning.

As the basaltic injections become restricted to a narrow axial zone, true seafloor spreading initiates with the Vine-Matthews-type magnetic anomaly stripes. Axial propagation of the oceanic rift occurs, resulting in a continuous axis of spreading. The rift may be intersected by a shear or fracture zone, which acts as locked zones and prevent further propagation. Zones of compression may develop.

== Composition ==
While there is a general agreement that the axial trough of the Red Sea originated by seafloor spreading, and therefore is underlain by oceanic crust, the nature of the crust beneath the main trough and coastal plains of the Red Sea is still controversial, leading to the development of a few theories. One theory suggests that the entire Red Sea basin is underlain by oceanic crust, while another theory claims that the main trough is underlain only in part by oceanic crust. A third theory suggests that outside the axial trough, the crust has a continental composition, with the presence of basaltic dykes, while another hypothesis suggests that the lower crust in the rift consists of rift meta-sediments, in direct contact with the upper mantle. All geophysical data from the axial trough reveal seismic velocities typical for oceanic crust. The main trough, however, is characterized by a high degree of lateral variation, with abrupt changes in basement velocities from typical continental to typical oceanic signatures.

== Volcanic activity ==
The rift zone includes the island of Jabal al-Tair, formed by the basaltic stratovolcano of the same name, located northwest of the Bab al-Mandab passage at the mouth of the Red Sea, about halfway between Yemen and Eritrea. The volcano erupted on 30 September 2007, after 124 years of dormancy.

== Resources ==
The axial deep of the rift was the location of the first known hot hydrothermal brines discovered on the sea floor. Workers from 1949 through the 1960s confirmed the presence of hot (60 °C (140 °F)) saline brines and associated metalliferous muds. The hot solutions were emanating from an active subseafloor rift.

== See also ==
- Afar triple junction
- Gulf of Suez Rift
