= Arabian plate =

Minor tectonic plate

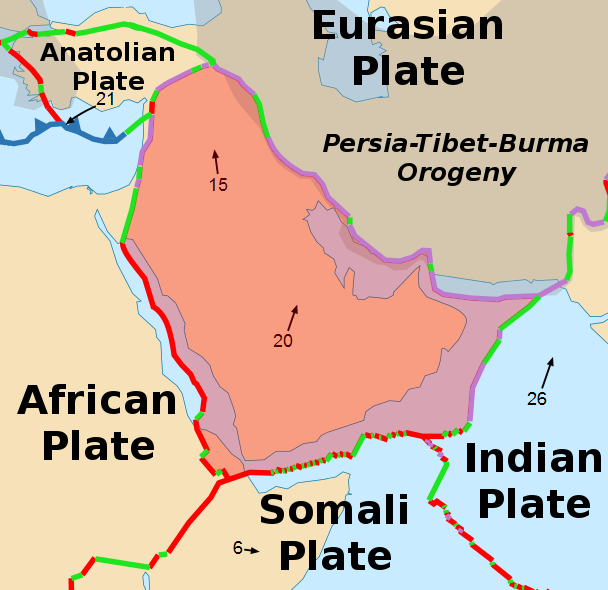
- Type: Minor
- Approximate area: 5,000,000 km^{2} (1,900,000 sq mi)
- Movement^{1}: North
- Speed^{1}: 15–20 mm/year
- Features: Arabian Peninsula, Gulf of Aden, Indian Ocean, Arabian/Persian Gulf, Red Sea
- ^{1}Relative to the African plate

The Arabian plate, also known as Circum-Arabian tectonic plate is a minor tectonic plate in the Northern and Eastern Hemispheres.

It is one of the three continental plates (along with the African and Indian plates) that have been moving northward in geological history and colliding with the Eurasian plate. This collision is resulting in a mingling of plate pieces and mountain ranges extending in the west from the Pyrenees, crossing Southern Europe to Iranian plateau, forming the Alborz and the Zagros Mountains, to the Himalayas and ranges of Southeast Asia.

Arabian plate showing general tectonic and structural features

== Lexicology ==
The Arabian plate is a designation of the region, and it is also sometimes referred to as the Arab plate.

== Borders ==
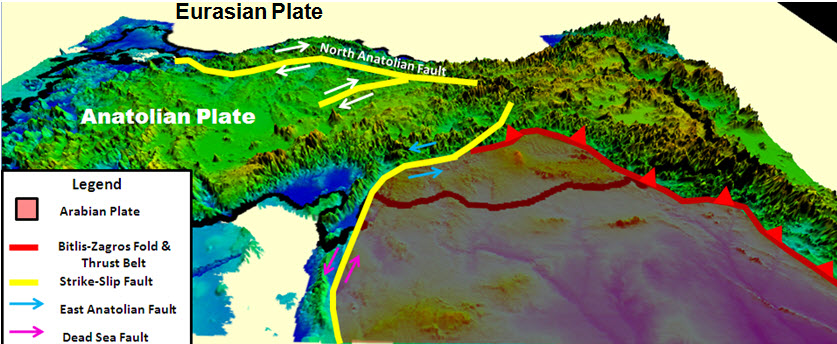
Eurasian, Anatolian, and Arabian (purple coloring) plates

The Arabian plate consists mostly of the Arabian Peninsula; it extends westward to the Sinai Peninsula and the Red Sea and northward to the Levant. The plate borders are:

- East, with the Indo-Australian plate, at the Owen fracture zone
- South, with the African plate, often known as the Nubia plate, to the west and the Somali plate and the Indo-Australian plate to the east
- West, a left lateral fault boundary with the African plate called the Dead Sea Transform (DST), and a divergent boundary with the African plate called the Red Sea Rift which runs the length of the Red Sea;
- North, convergent boundary with the Anatolian plate and Eurasian plate, including the East Anatolian Fault, Zagros fold and thrust belt, and Makran Trench.

== History ==
The Arabian plate was part of the African plate during most of the Phanerozoic Eon (Paleozoic–Cenozoic), until the Oligocene Epoch of the Cenozoic Era. The Red Sea rifting began in the Eocene, and the separation of Africa and Arabia occurred approximately 25 million years ago in the Oligocene, and since then the Arabian plate has been moving toward the Eurasian plate. The opening of the Red Sea rift led to volcanic activity. There are volcanic fields called the Older Harrats, such as Harrat Khaybar and Harrat Rahat, cover parts of the western Arabian plate. Some activity still continues especially around Medina, and there are regular eruptions within the Red Sea.

The collision between the Arabian plate and Eurasia is pushing up the Zagros Mountains of Iran. Because the Arabian plate and Eurasian plate collide, some cities such as those in southeastern Turkey (which is on the Arabian plate) may undergo earthquakes, tsunamis, and volcanoes.

== Countries, regions, and cities ==
Countries within the plate include Bahrain, Djibouti, Iraq, Jordan, Kuwait, Oman, Qatar, Saudi Arabia, Syria, United Arab Emirates and Yemen. Regions include the Anti-Lebanon Mountains (Lebanon), parts of Awdal (Somalia/Somaliland), the Khuzestan province (Iran), the Southeastern Anatolia region (Turkey), and the Southern Denkalya subregion (Eritrea).

The largest cities in the Arabian plate, by population, are (not in order): Amman, Baghdad, Riyadh, Dubai, Jeddah, Doha, Aintab, and Halab.
