= 2011 Nabro eruption =

Volcanic eruption in the Southern Red Sea Region of Eritrea

2011 eruption of Nabro Volcano
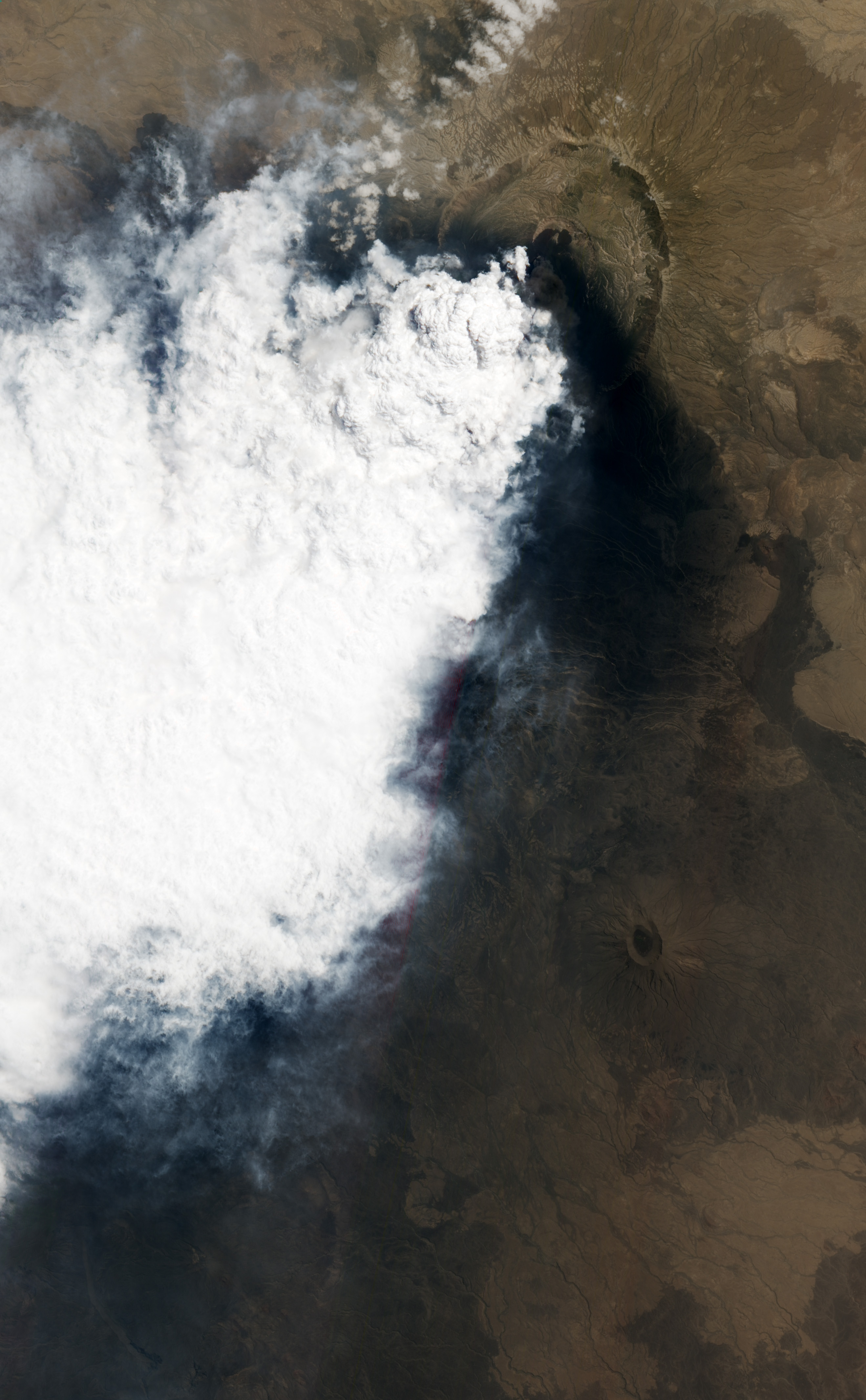
- Natural-color satellite image showing a close-up view of the volcanic plume and eruption site on 24 June 2011.
- Volcano: Nabro Volcano
- Start date: 12 June 2011
- Type: est. Strombolian/Vulcanian/Plinian
- Location: Eritrea, Africa; 13.36°N 41.69°E
- VEI: 4
- Impact: at least 7 people killed; ash deposited on at least 8 villages in Ethiopia and Eritrea, including Mekele and Asmara; lava flow reached 1 km wide by 20 km long

The 2011 Nabro eruption was an eruption of the Nabro stratovolcano in the Southern Red Sea Region of Eritrea, which began on 12 June 2011 after a series of earthquakes. The eruption killed seven and possibly a further 31 people and is estimated to be the highest altitude injection of sulfur dioxide (SO_{2}) ever observed by satellite. The Mount Pinatubo eruption 20 years earlier emitted ten times more SO_{2}. The ash cloud from the eruption reached altitudes which disrupted airline traffic in the region. Until the eruption began, the volcano had no records of historical eruptions.

== Gallery ==
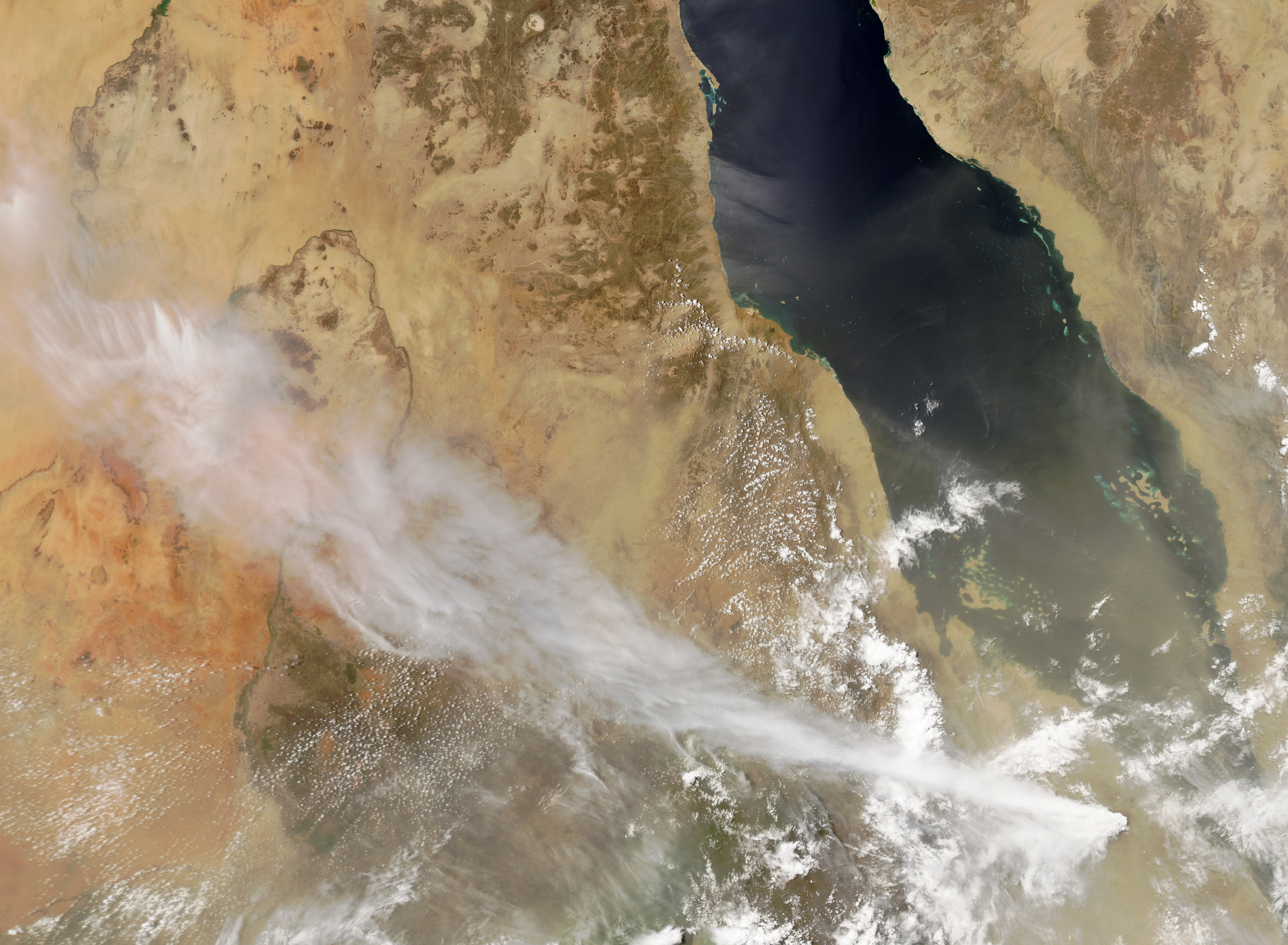
Satellite image of Ethiopia/ Eritrea showing the ash plume from Nabro on 13 June 2011.

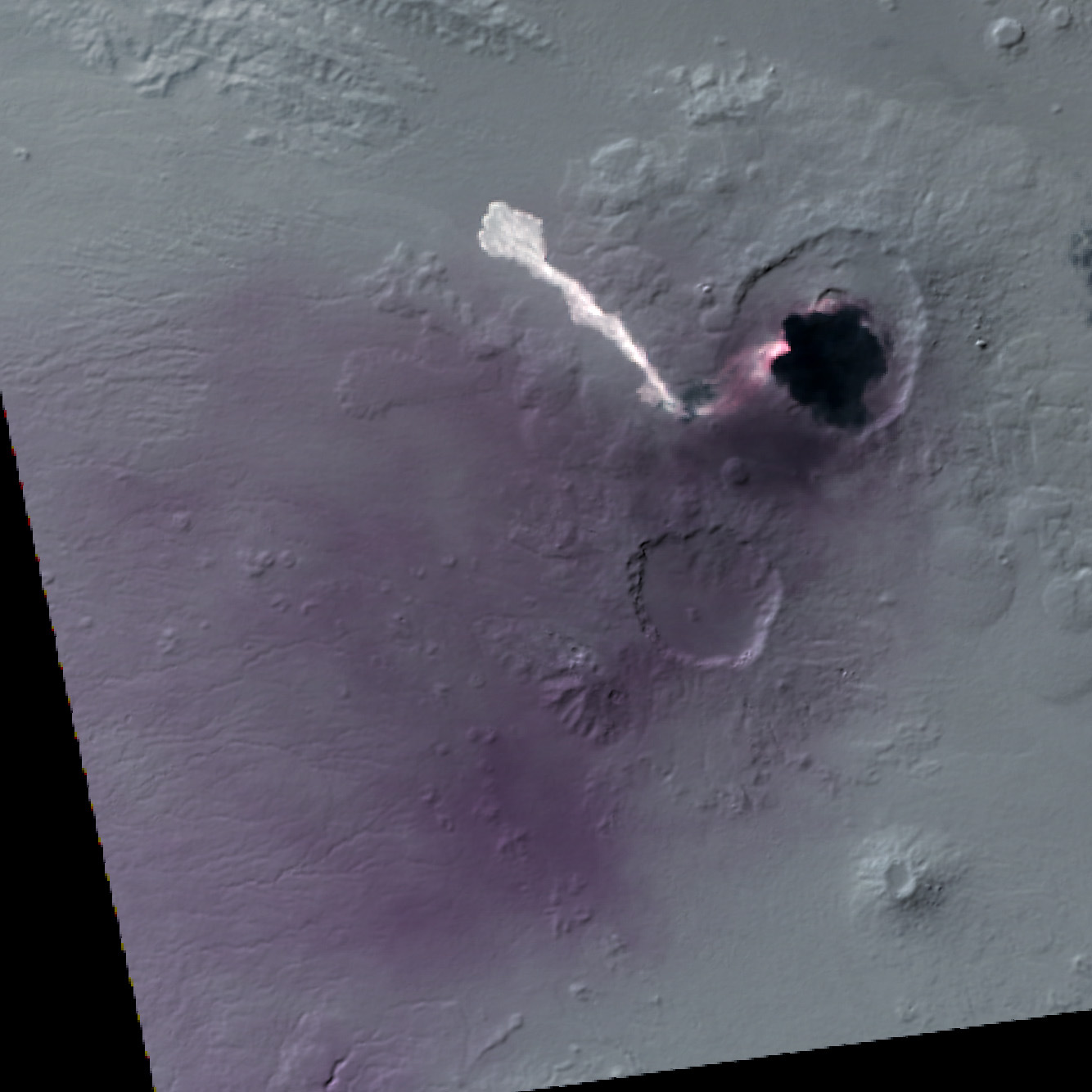
False color image from 19 June 2011 showing extent of lava flow on that date.

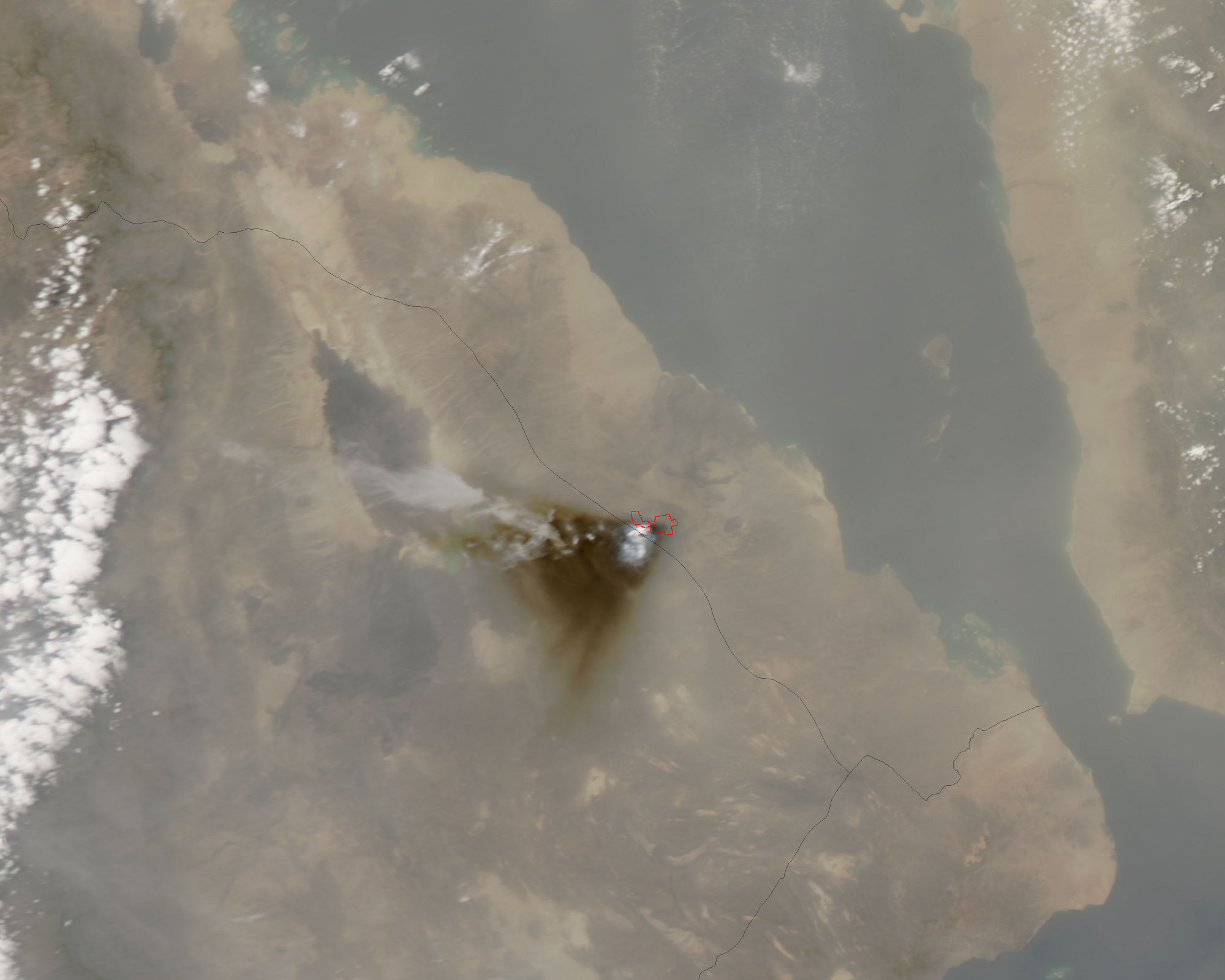
True color image from 19 June 2011 showing area affected by tephra deposition, and international boundaries.

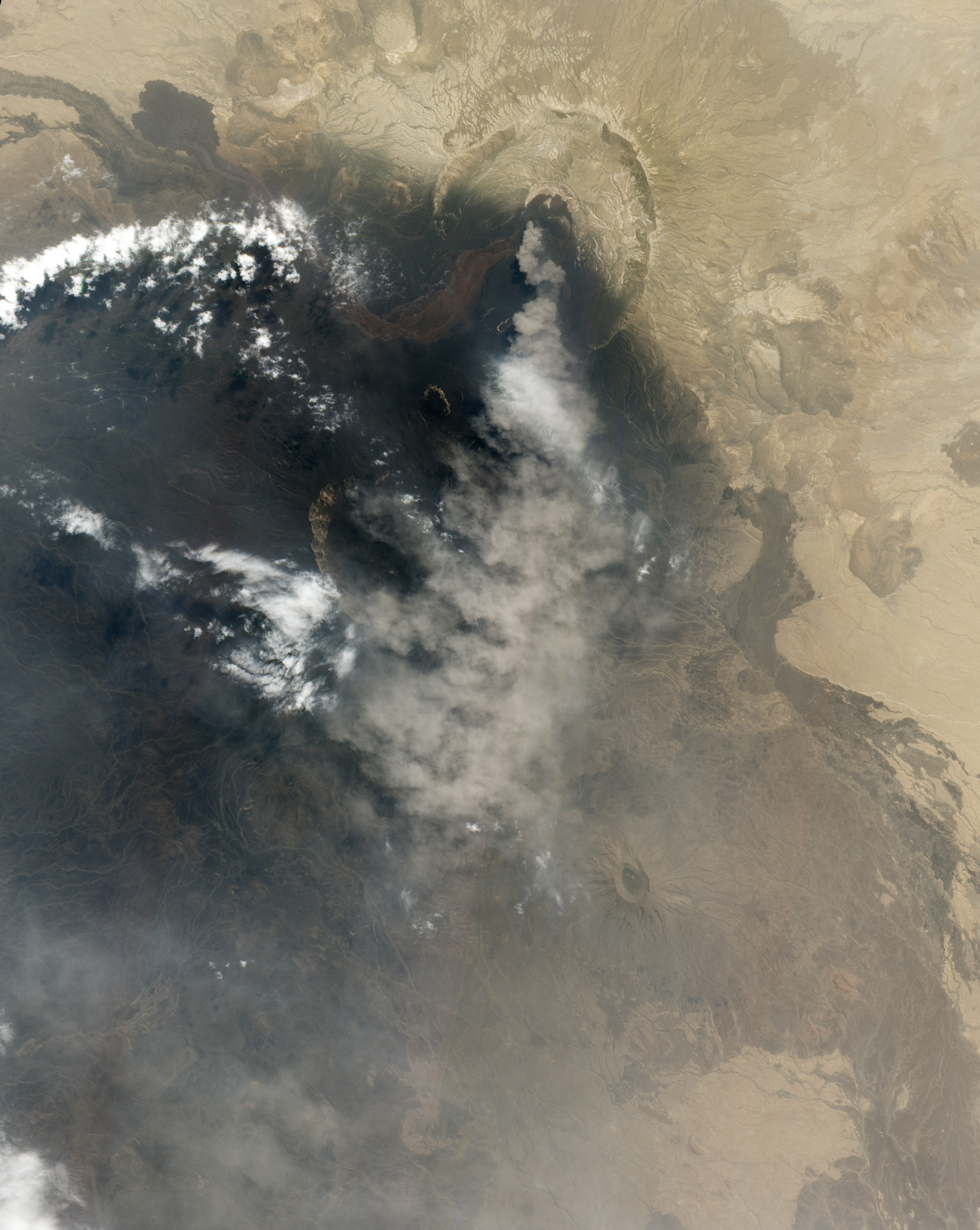
Natural color satellite view of the volcano on 29 June 2011.

== Eruption ==
On 12 June 2011, satellite images showed a large volcanic eruption shortly after 22.00 UTC 12 June (close to 01.00 13 June local time), in the Southern Red Sea Region. It was first thought to have originated at Dubbi Volcano, but has been confirmed to be from the Nabro stratovolcano in Eritrea, near the Ethiopian border.

Five days later, on 17 June 2011, the Volcanic Ash Advisory Center (VAAC) reported that the eruption had ceased.

Then, on 18 June 2011 (at noon, local time) NASA's Aqua satellite passed overhead providing MODIS images which showed an ash plume heading in west-north-westerly direction.

On 19 June 2011, the volcano produced the highest level of sulfur dioxide emissions in the Earth's atmosphere ever detected from space. Satellite images showed a 15 km long lava flow.

The next day, on 20 June 2011: VAAC reported that the SO_{2} eruption was continuing.

Between the 22 and 27 June 2011, the eruption of sulfur dioxide, water vapour, and ash was confirmed to be still active by MODIS pictures taken from the TERRA satellite.

In the first fifteen days of eruption, Nabro emitted a total SO2 mass of about 4.5 MT.

On 24 June 2011, NASA Earth Observatory provided this false-color image (below) using the Advanced Land imager on the EO-1 satellite, showing that the lava flow from the 19th had not progressed significantly further, but that the eruption was ongoing.

On 30 June 2011, at least some of the people who have been evacuated are reported to be in Hawra and Wadien.

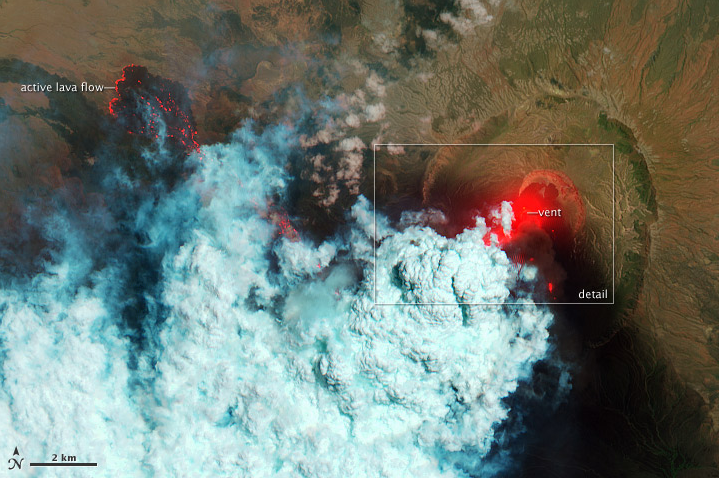
False color image from 24 June

That same day, eruption satellite images seem to show the volcano has stopped producing the ash cloud.

By 1 July 2011, eruption satellite images show a fresh ash cloud eruption, diminishing until 4 July, when the ash eruption still appears to be ongoing.

Under a week later, on 6 July 2011, the ash cloud seems to have again stopped being produced. On 7 July 2011, SO_{2} emissions were much reduced. But on 12 July 2011, the eruption was still ongoing.

=== Other eruptions ===
Small eruptions were also reported in the Afambo and Sireru areas.

On 22 June 2011, the Eritrean government reported that a lava flow up to 1 kilometre (0.6 mi) wide and up to 15 metres (49 ft) high had surfaced in Seriru, southern Denkalia, and destroyed vegetation for about 20 kilometres (12 mi).

By 27 June 2011, a thick emission of smoke from new lava eruptions were also reported in South Denkalia, Husele and Gagun.

Then on 30 June 2011 the Eritrean government reported that the lava flow in Seriru had slowed to 20 metres (66 ft) per day. They also reported that in some places the flow was 4 kilometres (2.5 mi) wide and 20 metres (66 ft) high.

Note: It is still uncertain whether the information regarding the lava flow in "Seriru" refers to the main flow, as seen from the satellite images, though it seems likely.

== Ash cloud ==
The eruption has ejected a large ash cloud near the Eritrea–Ethiopia border region, extending over 1,000 km (620 mi) into neighboring Sudan.

The height of the ash cloud peaked at 14,000 m, implying a VEI of 4.

Forecasters predicted correctly that the ash plume might reach Israel, but no flights were cancelled at Ben-Gurion Airport on 14 June. Elsewhere, however, the ash cloud began disrupting air traffic on 14 June with UAE-based Emirates flights being cancelled; flights disruptions extended to other companies the following day. Hillary Clinton, Secretary of State for the United States, shortened her state visit to Ethiopia. Djibouti Airport was closed, and several airlines suspended flights to Ethiopia.

Mek'ele and Asmara were partially covered by volcanic ash.

== Effects ==
On 16 June, the inhabitants of Afambo, Nebro, and Sireru were evacuated.

By 19 June, ash had been deposited at least 60 km (37 mi) beyond the Ethiopian border in a WNW–to–SSW direction.

By 20 June, eight villages in the Biddu district of Ethiopia were covered by volcanic ash, affecting at least 5,000 people and polluting springs and streams. One entire community has not been heard from. Save the Children reports many community members, especially children, are sick and in desperate need of medical attention. Vomiting and retching were reported as being common effects.

On 21 June, an Eritrean government statement reported seven people have been killed and three injured. It was also reported that the Lake Afrera salt deposits now contain sulfuric acid, making the salt inedible.

On 6 July, reports suggest 48,000 people in the Bidu, Afdera, Erebti, Elidar, Teru and Kori woredas were in need of aid (with ash affecting food and water sources), and that the casualty total had reached 31 dead in the Bidu woreda.

Another 167,153 people, in the Elidar and Kori woredas, were reported as requiring monitoring according to the Afar regional government. However a spokesman for the Ethiopean Government Agriculture Ministry is reported to have said "We have looked at the document and I would like to make it clear that it is not a national document and that we have not endorsed it, the ministry has no record of casualties, it is still too early to say how many people had been affected and needed help."

== Geology ==
The erupting volcano is in the Afar Triangle, in the larger Danakil Depression that holds many other active volcanoes. However, neither volcano thought potentially responsible for the eruption had been active in the past century, with Dubbi last erupting in 1861 and Nabro remaining quiet for thousands of years. No eruption of Nabro occurred before in recorded history. Basalt, trachyte and rhyolite are among the rock types which Nabro has produced as lava flows and pyroclastics.

== Earthquakes ==
A series of moderate earthquakes occurred near a sparsely populated part of the Eritrea–Ethiopia border, starting at 15:37 UTC on Sunday, 12 June 2011. By 21:37 UTC, at least 19 earthquakes of magnitude 4.5 or greater had occurred. The tremors were associated with this eruption. The initial quake registered a magnitude of 5.1 M_{w} with a focal depth of 10 km (6.2 mi), and was succeeded by multiple lighter tremors. Hours later, two consecutive magnitude 5.7 M_{w} earthquakes struck the region at 20:32 and 21:03 UTC, occurring at very similar depths. The latter tremors resulted in localized strong shaking, registering at VII (very strong) on the Mercalli scale near the epicenters.
