= Giulietti (surname) =

Giulietti is an Italian surname. Notable people with the surname include:

- Ana Maria Giulietti (born 1945), Brazilian biochemist, botanist, and educator
- Giuseppe Giulietti (trade unionist) (1879–1953), Italian sailor who became a leading trade union activist
- Giuseppe Giulietti (politician) (born 1953), Italian journalist, trade unionist and politician
- Giuseppe Maria Giulietti (1847–1881), Italian soldier, geographer and explorer
- Logan Giulietti-Schmitt (born 1985), American former competitive ice dancer

== See also ==
- Lake Giulietti or Lake Afrera, hypersaline lake in northern Ethiopia
