= Sork Ale =

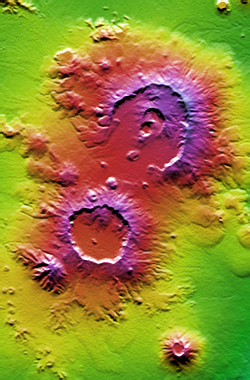
- False-color topographical relief image of Nabro caldera (top; in Eritrea) next to the Mallahle volcanic caldera, then Sork Ale in the bottom right.

Highest point
- Elevation: 1,611 m (5,285 ft)
- Coordinates: 13°10′48″N 41°43′30″E

Geography
- Location within Ethiopia
- Location: Ethiopia
- Parent range: Danakil Alps

Geology
- Mountain type: Stratovolcano
- Last eruption: Holocene?

Sork Ale (also known as Asdaga or Sorcali) is a sicilic stratovolcano located in the Danakil Horst at the southern end of the Danakil Alps near the Ethiopia/Eritrea border. It makes up part of the Bidu volcanic complex (with the Nabro Volcano, Bara Ale and Mallahle).

The volcano has scoria cones suggesting Strombolian eruptions. At the top of the volcano is a 1 km wide 300m steep sided caldera there are satellite vents on the south east flank. The volcano lies on the western end of lava field.
