= Danakilia franchettii =

Conservation status
- Endangered (IUCN 3.1)

Scientific classification
- Kingdom: Animalia
- Phylum: Chordata
- Class: Actinopterygii
- Order: Cichliformes
- Family: Cichlidae
- Genus: Danakilia
- Species: D. franchettii

Binomial name
- Danakilia franchettii (Vinciguerra, 1931)

Species of fish

Danakilia franchettii is a species of cichlid fish endemic to the saline Lake Afrera and nearby swamps in Ethiopia. It was the only member of the genus Danakilia until the description of D. dinicolai in 2010. The species is listed as endangered, due to water abstraction and mining of salt in the lake. The specific name honours the Italian explorer Raimondo Franchetti (1889-1935), who organised, at his own expense, the expedition that collected type.
