= Giuseppe Giulietti =

Giuseppe Giulietti may refer to:

- Giuseppe Giulietti (politician) (born 1953), Italian politician
- Giuseppe Giulietti (trade unionist) (1879–1953), Italian trade unionist
- Giuseppe Maria Giulietti (1847–1881), Italian explorer
