= Mallahle =

Stratovolcano on the border between Ethiopia and Eritrea

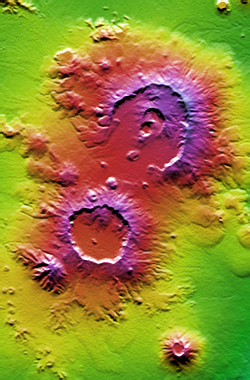
- False-color topographical relief image of Nabro caldera (top; in Eritrea) next to the Mallahle volcanic caldera, then Sork Ale in the bottom right.

Highest point
- Elevation: 1,875 m (6,152 ft)
- Coordinates: 13°16′N 41°39′E

Geography
- Location within Ethiopia
- Location: Ethiopia

Geology
- Mountain type: Stratovolcano
- Last eruption: Holocene?

Mallahle (also Mallali or Aruku) is a stratovolcano on the border of Ethiopia and Eritrea, with a 6 km (4 mile) wide caldera.

Mallahle is the highest peak in the Afdera region of Ethiopia. It is located in the Danakil Horst at the southern end of the Danakil Alps. It makes up part of the Bidu volcanic complex (with the Nabro Volcano, Bara Ale and Sork Ale).
