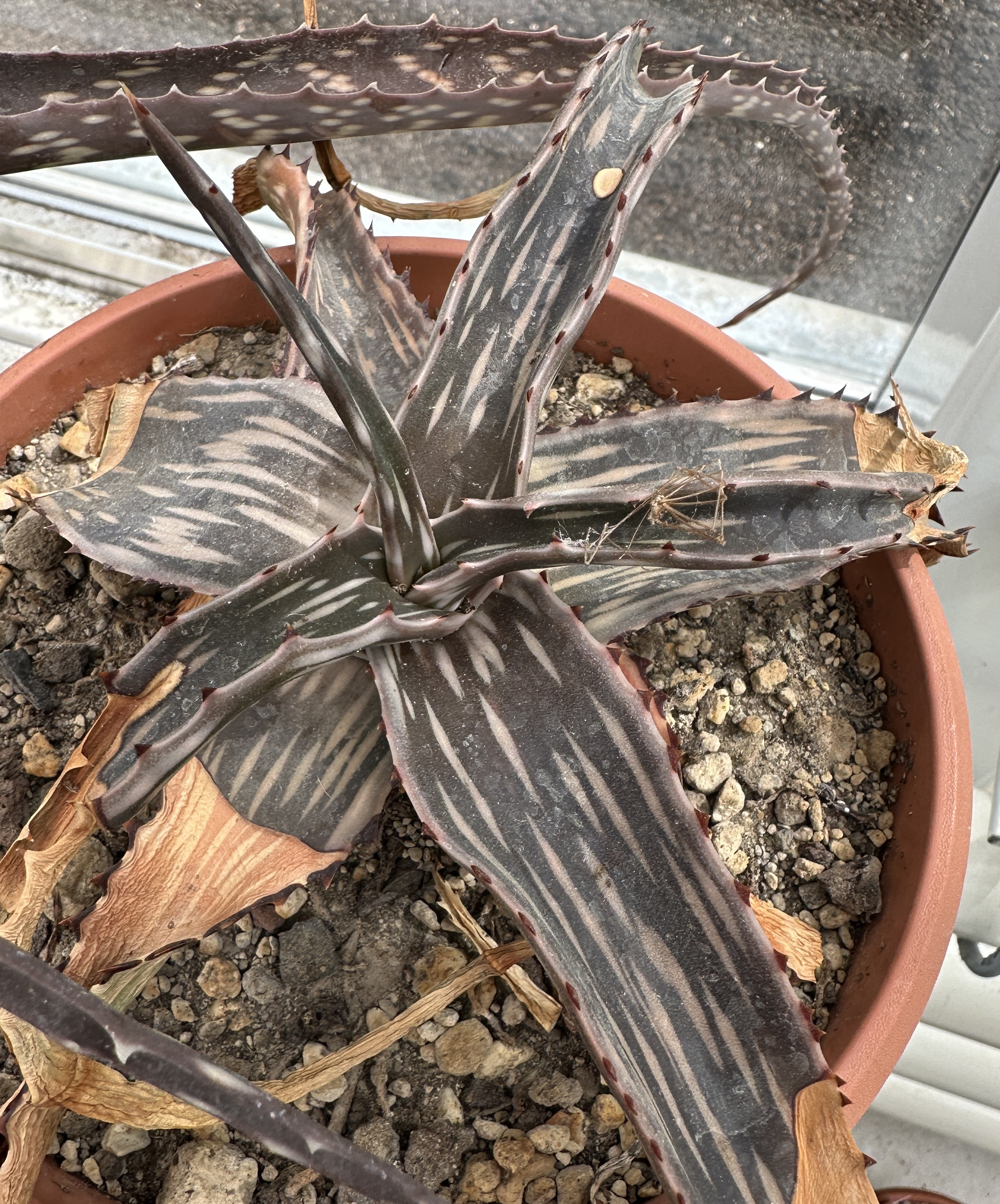

Conservation status
- CITES Appendix II (CITES)

Scientific classification
- Kingdom: Plantae
- Clade: Tracheophytes
- Clade: Angiosperms
- Clade: Monocots
- Order: Asparagales
- Family: Asphodelaceae
- Subfamily: Asphodeloideae
- Genus: Aloe
- Species: A. montis-nabro

Binomial name
- Aloe montis-nabro Orlando & El Azzouni

= Aloe montis-nabro =

Species of flowering succulent plant

Aloe montis-nabro is a species of Aloe native to the slopes of Mt. Nabro in Eritrea described in 2014 in the CactusWorld journal by Orlando and El Azzouni.

== Description ==
Similar in leaf pattern to many aloes such as Aloe dijboutiensis, Aloe matucana, this aloe has white streaks on its leaves. This plant has white margins, with serrated edges. This aloe does clump, but not majorly, usually 2-6 plants are in a clump. This plant's leaves are brown when sun stressed, and olive green if not. Leaves are in a "triangle" shape and grow in a rosette like other aloes.

== Flowers ==
The inflorescence, branched has flowers like Aloe vera. The flowers are tubular, and orange with anthers and stigmas.

== Threats ==
In 2011, Mt. Nabro, the volcano this plant is native to and grows on erupted. It is unknown if this plant still exists in the wild as no botanists have gone to this plant's native habitat since the eruption.
