= Afdera (woreda) =

District in Afar Region, Ethiopia

Coordinates: 13°15′N 41°00′E

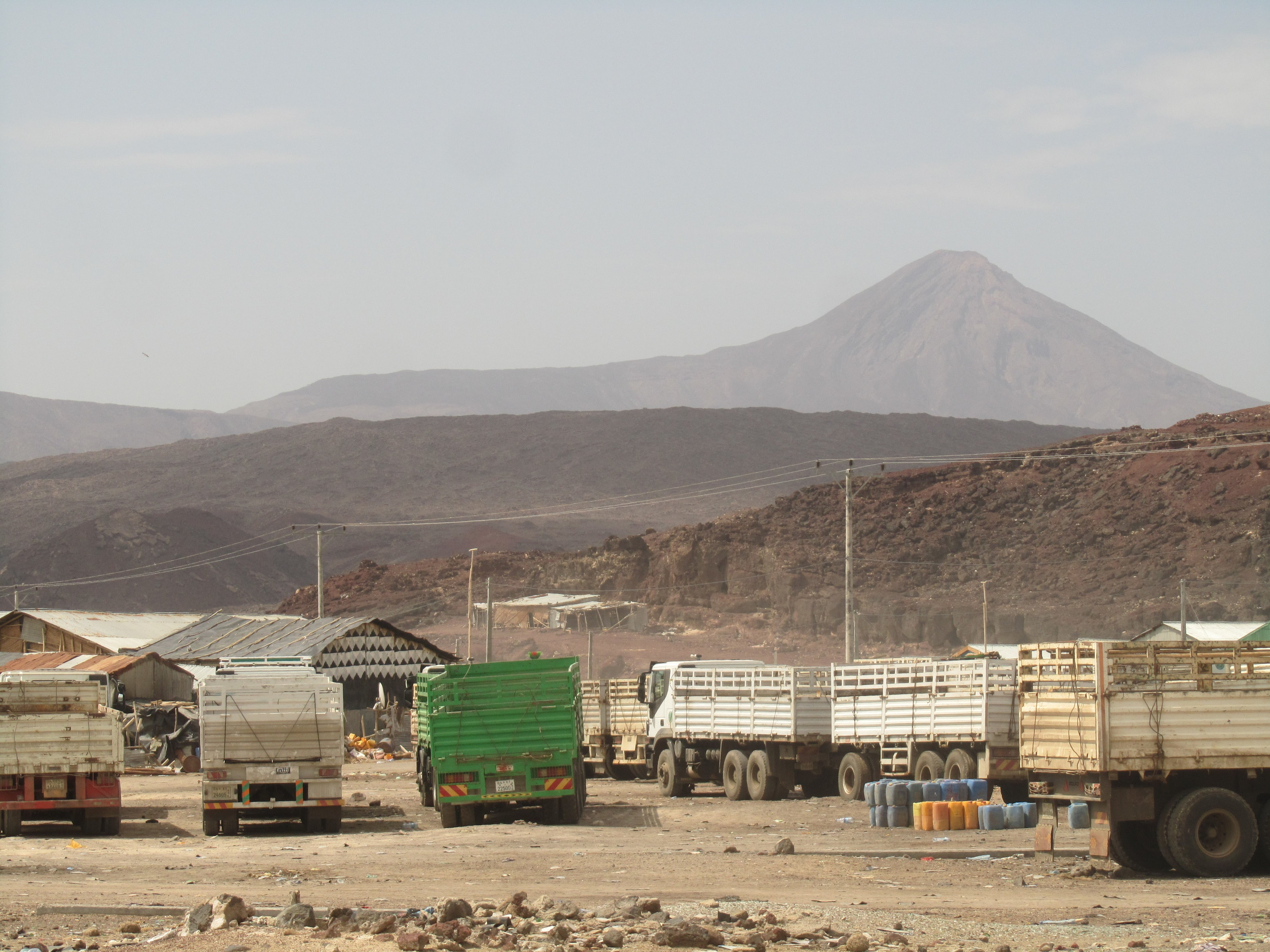
Salt mine in Afdera

Afdera (Afar: Afxeera) is one of the woredas, in the Afar Region of Ethiopia. It is named after the saline Lake Afdera, located in the southern part of the Afar Depression. Part of the Administrative Zone 2, Afdera is bordered on the southwest by the Administrative Zone 4, on the west by Erebti and Abala, on the north by Berhale, on the northeast by Eritrea, and on the southeast by Administrative Zone 1. The largest town of this woreda is Afdera.

== Overview ==
The highest peak in Afdera is Mount Mallahle (1875 meters or 6152 feet); other mountains in this woreda include Erta Ale and Borawli. Mining is the principal industry in this woreda. The best known resource extracted is salt; according to the Afar Regional Mining and Energy Office, there are 300 active land grants around Lake Afdera, which the Office reports creates 1,800 permanent and over 40,000 part-time jobs.

An all-weather road constructed in the 1990s connects this woreda to the main Awash - Asseb highway. About 90 kilometers of this gravel road, connecting Afdera to Serdo, was completed in late January 2009 at a cost of 387 million Birr. A spokesman for the Ethiopian Roads Authority stated that since it links with the port in Djibouti City, the upgraded road would have great significance for tourism and import-export trade exchange.

At the Tio waterhole, near the southeastern border with Administrative Zone 4, L.M. Nesbitt located the 1884 massacre of the Italian expedition led by Gustavo Bianchi and Giuseppe Maria Giulietti. Nesbitt was prevented from erecting a cairn to mark the site by the Afars, who believed this was part of a blood feud.

== Demographics ==
Based on the 2007 Census conducted by the Central Statistical Agency of Ethiopia (CSA), this woreda has a total population of 32,225, of whom 18,191 are men and 14,034 women; with an area of 7,435.45 square kilometers (2870.84 square miles), Afdera has a population density of 4.33 people per square kilometer (11.25 people per square mile). While 3,578 or 11.10% are urban inhabitants, a further 4,402 or 13.66% are pastoralists. A total of 4,803 households were counted in this woreda, which results in an average of 6.7 persons to a household, and 4,887 housing units. 98.6% of the population said they were Muslim, and 1.34% were Orthodox Christians.
