= Lake Assal =

Lake Assal can refer to:

- Lake Assal (Djibouti), a crater lake in central Djibouti
- Lake Karum, a lake in the Afar Region of Ethiopia also known as Lake Assal
