= Lake Asal =

Lake Asal may refer to:

- Lake Assal (Djibouti)
- Lake Karum, in Ethiopia
