= Karum =

Karum may refer to:

- Karum (trade post), ancient Assyrian trade posts in Anatolia from 20th to 18th centuries BC
- Lake Karum, lake in the Afar Region of Ethiopia
