= Luigi Razza =

Italian journalist and politician (1892–1935)

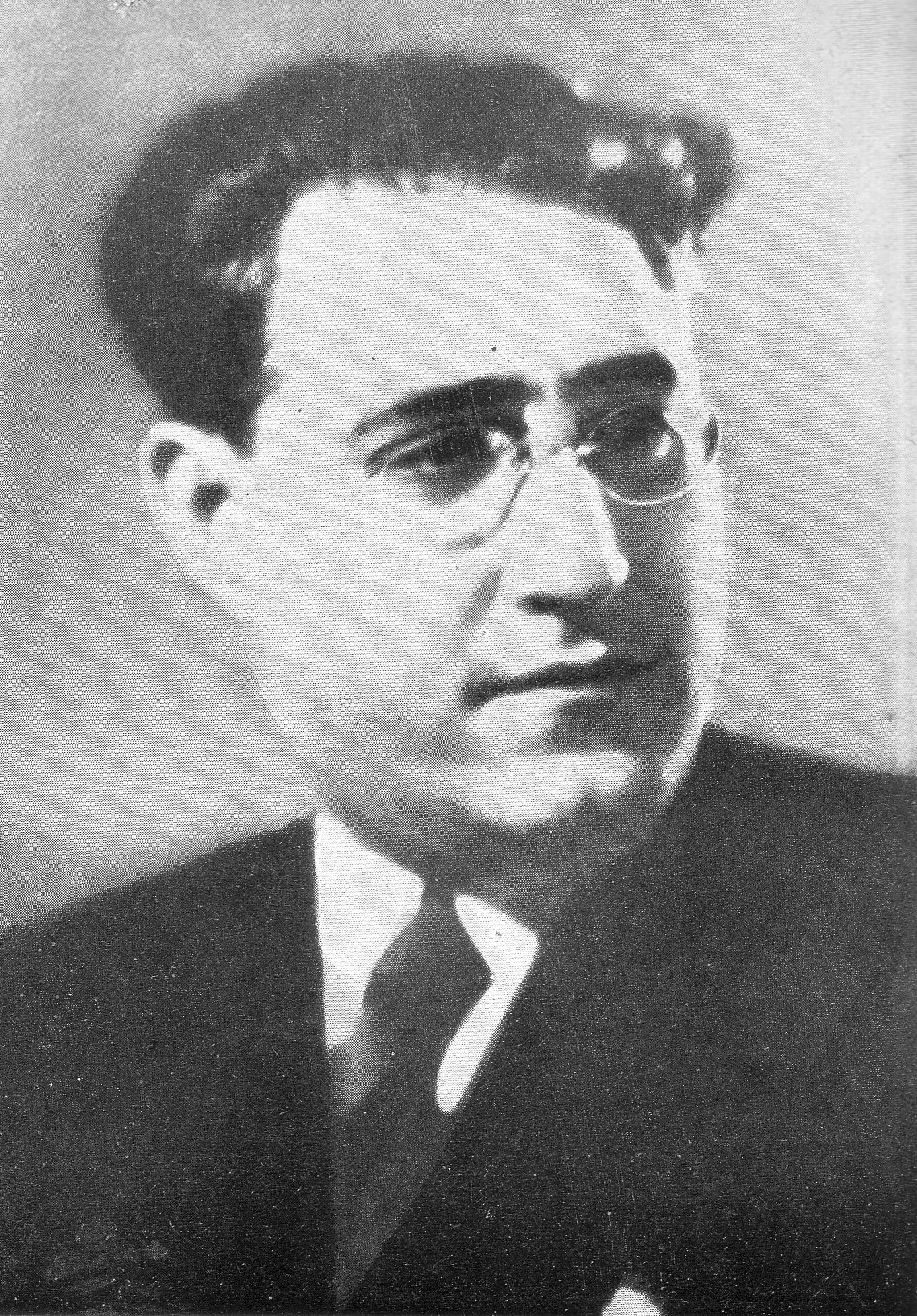

Minister of Public Works
- In office January 1935 – August 1935
- Prime Minister: Benito Mussolini
- Preceded by: Araldo di Crollalanza
- Succeeded by: Giuseppe Cobolli Gigli

Personal details
- Born: 12 December 1892 Monteleone di Calabria, Kingdom of Italy
- Died: 7 August 1935 (aged 42) Cairo, Kingdom of Egypt
- Party: National Fascist Party
- Parent(s): Leone Razza (father); Carmela De Luca (mother)
- Occupation: Journalist

Luigi Razza (1892–1935) was an Italian journalist and fascist politician who died in an aviation accident in Cairo while serving as the minister of public works. A member of the National Fascist Party, he held several significant posts during the Fascist rule in Italy.

== Early life and education ==
Razza was born in Monteleone di Calabria on 12 December 1892. His parents were Leone and Carmela De Luca, and Razza the eldest of three brothers (Domenico and Giuseppe). Razza obtained a high school diploma in 1912. He later received a law degree in Milan.

== Career ==
Moving to Apulia in 1912, Razza joined the trade union organization of peasants first in Lecce and then in Corato, Monopoli, and Cerignola. He founded some newspapers and directed them, such as Il Tribuno Salentino, Il Risorgimento, and La Ragione. In April 1914, following a violent general strike, Razza fled to Milan where he clandestinely continued to work for the Unione Sindacale Italiana. Razza was the editor of Il Popolo d'Italia between 1914 and 1919. He was a member of the central committee and then secretary of the Italian fascist revolutionary action from 1914 to 1916. On 23 March 1919, he was appointed secretary of the fascist group in Trentino. He participated in the March on Rome in 1922. Razza joined Edmondo Rossoni's fascist trade union organization and became its secretary. In 1923, he was appointed secretary of the local Federation of Fascist Trade Unions in Milan, and at the same time he was appointed its deputy secretary general. In 1924, he was elected a deputy from Tuscany.

Rossoni appointed Razza secretary of the National Fascist Agricultural Union, a position he held until 1932. He was then made a member of the Fascist Grand Council. In 1930, Razza was named first commissioner of the newly established Commissariat for Migration and Internal Colonization which he held until 1933. Next he was appointed minister of public works to the Mussolini Cabinet in January 1935, but his term was short lived due to his death in August that year.

== Death and funeral ==
Razza was sent by Benito Mussolini to East Africa for a mission on 7 August 1935. His plane exploded after taking off from Cairo to Asmara, and he died in the incident with four crews, his secretary, Vincenzo Minasi, and Baron Raimondo Franchetti. A funeral ceremony was held in Rome with the attendance of Mussolini on 19 August for seven victims of the accident.
