= Jalua Volcano =

Volcano in Eritrea

Jalua
- Location within Eritrea

Highest point
- Elevation: 713 m (2,339 ft)
- Coordinates: 15°02′31″N 39°49′12″E

Geography
- Location: Eritrea

Geology
- Mountain type: Stratovolcano
- Last eruption: Unknown

The Jalua Volcano is a volcano located in the Northern Red Sea region of Eritrea. It is a stratovolcano, with no eruption ever recorded.

== See also ==
- List of volcanoes in Eritrea
- List of stratovolcanoes
