= List of volcanoes in Eritrea =

This is a list of active and extinct volcanoes in Eritrea.

Name	Elevation		Location	Last eruption
Name	meters	feet	Coordinates	Last eruption
Alid	910	2966	14.88°N 39.92°E	Holocene
Asseb	910	2986	12.85°N 42.43°E	Holocene
Dubbi	987	5331	13.58°N 41.808°E	1861
Gufa	600	1969	12.55°N 42.53°E	Holocene
Jalua	713	2339	15.042°N 39.82°E	unknown
Mousa Ali	2028	6654	12.47°N 42.40°E	Holocene
Nabro	2218	7277	13.37°N 41.70°E	2012

Ardukoba(in realtà nello stato di Gibuti, eruzione fessurale del 1978
