= Araldo di Crollalanza =

Italian politician (1892–1986)

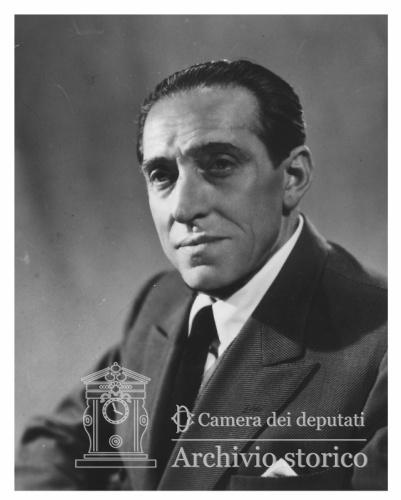

Minister for Public Works
- In office 1930–1935
- Prime Minister: Benito Mussolini
- Succeeded by: Luigi Razza

Personal details
- Born: 19 May 1892 Bari, Kingdom of Italy
- Died: 18 January 1986 (aged 93) Rome, Italy
- Party: National Fascist Party; Italian Social Movement

Araldo di Crollalanza (19 May 1892 – 18 January 1986) was an Italian journalist and politician who held significant posts in Fascist Italy. He was the minister of public works between 1930 and 1935 and a long-term member of the Italian Senate.

== Biography ==
Di Crollalanza was born in Bari on 19 May 1892. He contributed to the newspapers, including Il Corriere delle Puglie, La Gazzetta del Mezzogiorno and Il Popolo d'Italia. He fought in World War I and in 1919 established the National Combatants Association of Bari.

Di Crollalanza joined the National Fascist Party (PNF) at an early age. On 23 March 1919, Benito Mussolini appointed him as regional political secretary of the Fascist organization of Apulia and Lucania. In 1922 he took part in the march on Rome and in 1924 he was elected deputy from the PNF. In 1926 he was elected the mayor of Bari being the first Fascist to hold the post. When Di Crollalanza was in office he attempted to rebuild Bari as a new centre for Fascist rule and to make the city a bridge between the Orient and the Occident on the directives of Mussolini.

On 9 July 1928, di Crollalanza was appointed state secretary for public works. Di Crollalanza served as the minister of public works in the period 1930–1935 in the cabinet of Benito Mussolini. In addition to these posts Di Crollalanza continued to serve as the mayor of Bari being represented by his deputy Vincenzo Vella. In 1935 Di Crollalanza was named the president of a Fascist youth organisation, Opera Nazionale Balilla. In 1943 he joined the Italian Social Republic. After the fall of Fascism Di Crollalanza was arrested, but was released from prison soon and resumed political activity with the Italian Social Movement. Between 1953 and 1986 he served at the Italian Senate from the Italian Social Movement. in 1982, on the occasion of his ninetieth birthday, the President of the Senate Amintore Fanfani presented him with a gold medal. Di Crollalanza died in Rome on 18 January 1986.
