= Danakilia =

Scientific classification
- Kingdom: Animalia
- Phylum: Chordata
- Class: Actinopterygii
- Order: Cichliformes
- Family: Cichlidae
- Tribe: Oreochromini
- Genus: Danakilia; Thys van den Audenaerde, 1969

Type species
- Tilapia franchettii Vinciguerra, 1931

Genus of fishes

Danakilia is a genus of cichlids native to northeastern Africa where they are only known from saline lakes, rivers and creeks in the Danakil Depression of Ethiopia and Eritrea. There are two formally described species, along with three undescribed species currently known.

== Species ==
There are currently two recognized species in this genus:

- Danakilia dinicolai Stiassny, de Marchi & Lamboj, 2010
- Danakilia franchettii (Vinciguerra, 1931)

== See also ==
- Alcolapia – another cichlid genus from warm, saline lakes in Africa.
