= Gufa volcanic field =

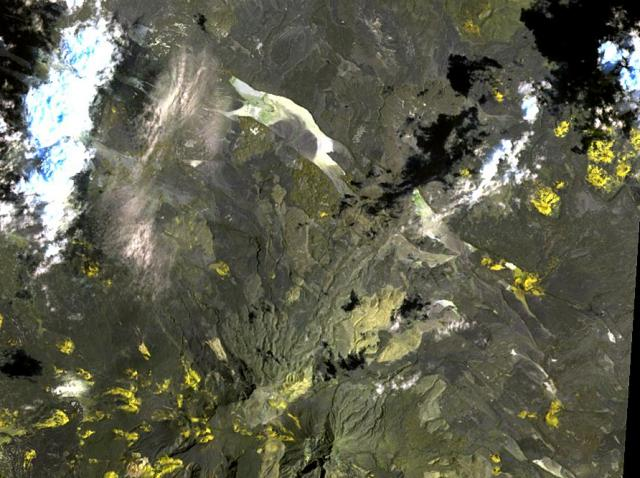
- Gufa volcanic field

Highest point
- Elevation: 600 m (2,000 ft)
- Coordinates: 12°33′N 42°32′E

Geography
- Location within Eritrea
- Location: Southern Red Sea Region, Eritrea

Geology
- Mountain type: Volcanic field
- Last eruption: Unknown

The Gufa volcanic field is located in the Southern Red Sea Region of Eritrea near the border with Djibouti. The peak elevation is 600 m where lava flows are visible. The last eruption in the field was inferred to be during the Holocene era.

== See also ==
- List of volcanoes in Eritrea
