= Assab volcanic field =

Volcanic field in Eritrea

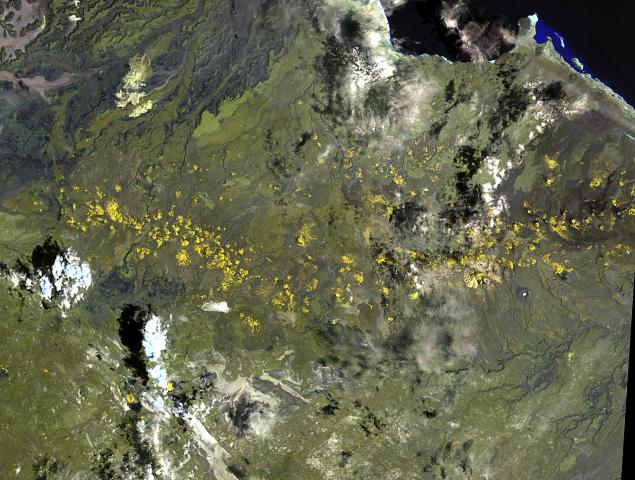
- Assab volcanic field

Highest point
- Elevation: 987 m (3,238 ft)
- Listing: Volcanoes of Eritrea
- Coordinates: 12°51′N 42°26′E

Geography
- Location within Eritrea
- Location: Southern Red Sea region, Eritrea

Geology
- Mountain type: Volcanic field
- Last eruption: Unknown

The Assab volcanic field is a group of basaltic cinder cones and associated lava flows located in the Southern Red Sea region of Eritrea. With a peak elevation of 987 m (3,238 ft), its most recently identified eruption occurred within the last 12,000 years during the current Holocene epoch.

== See also ==
- List of volcanic fields
