= Asavyo =

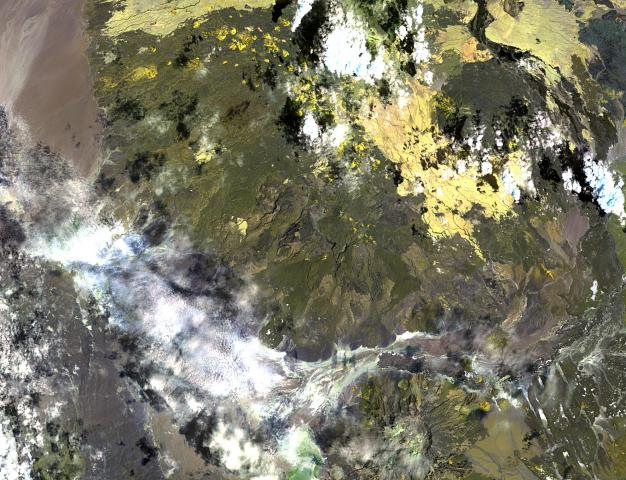
- Asavjo

Highest point
- Elevation: 1,324 m (4,344 ft)
- Listing: Volcanoes of Ethiopia
- Coordinates: 13°05′53″N 41°35′56″E

Geography
- Location within Ethiopia
- Location: Ethiopia

Geology
- Rock age: Holocene
- Mountain type: Stratovolcano
- Rock types: Basalt and Rhyolite
- Last eruption: Unknown

Asavyo also known as Bara Ale is a large silicic stratovolcano in Ethiopia, which forms part of the Bidu Volcanic complex. It lies about 20 km southwest from the Nabro and Mallahle volcanoes. Asavyo has a 12 km wide caldera.
