= Lake Afrera =

Lake in Ethiopia

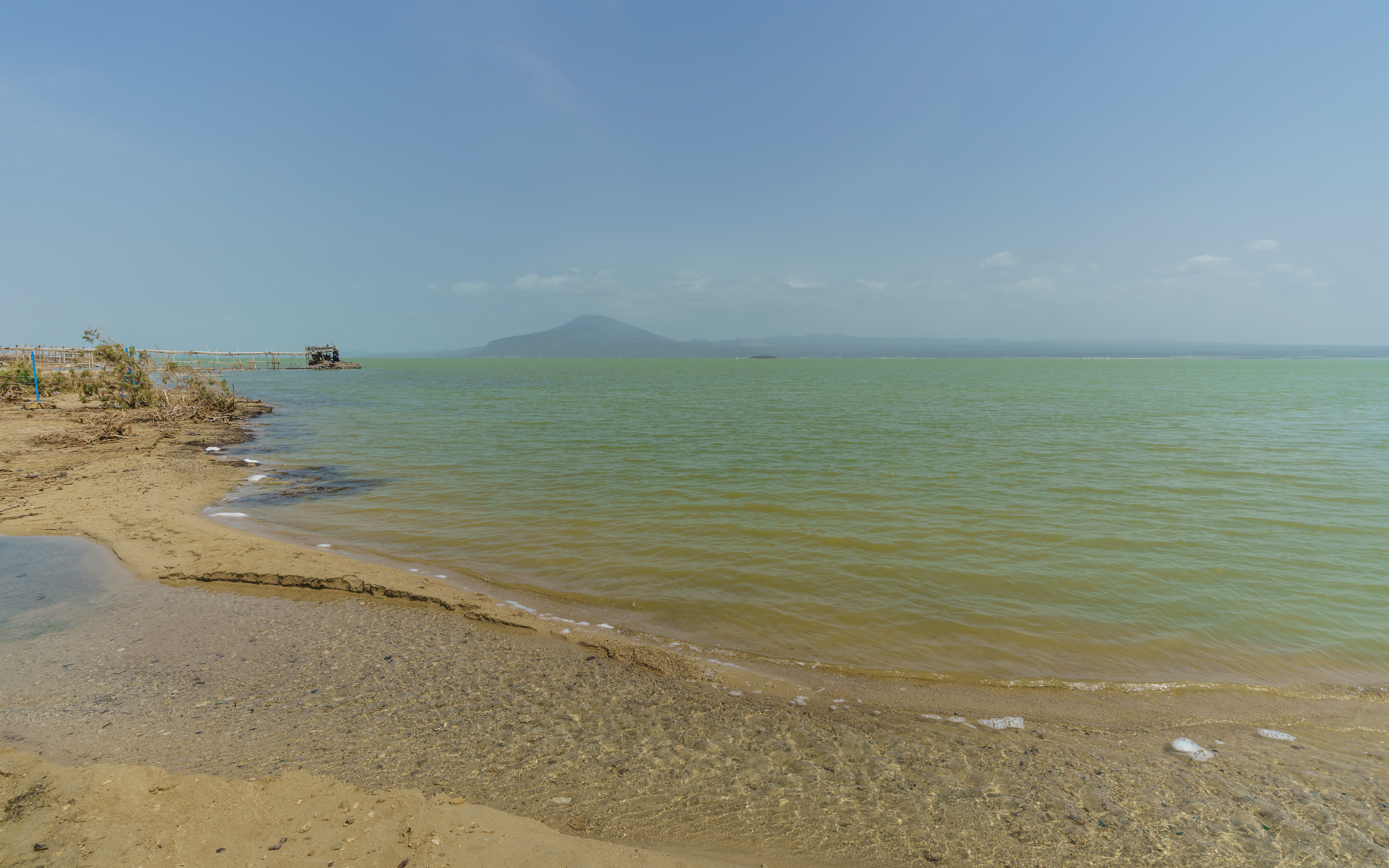

- Location within Ethiopia
- Interactive map of Lake Afrera
- Location: Afar Depression
- Coordinates: 13°17′N 40°55′E
- Basin countries: Eritrea, Ethiopia
- Surface area: 114.8 km^{2} (44 mi^{2})
- Average depth: 20.9 m (69 ft)
- Max. depth: 80 m (260 ft)
- Water volume: 2.4 km^{3} (0.58 cu mi)
- Surface elevation: −112 m (−367 ft)
- Islands: Franchetti Island

Lake Afrera (in Italian Lake Giuletti) is a hypersaline lake in northern Ethiopia. Located in Kilbet Rasu, Afar Region, it is one of the lakes of the Danakil Depression. It has a surface of 117 km^{2} (45 mi^{2}) and holds 2.4 km^{3} of brine. The maximal depth of Lake Afdera is 80 m in the northern basin and 76 m in the southern basin. No major river drains the lake. It is fed by hot springs along the shores of the lakes.

It is also known as Lake Giulietti, the name Raimondo Franchetti gave it after the Italian explorer Giuseppe Maria Giulietti was slain by Afars southwest of the lake. Another name for this body of water is Lake Egogi (or Egogi Bad), which is the name L. M. Nesbitt's Afar guide gave it when the Italian explorer became the first European to see it in 1928.

The single island in Lake Afrera, Franchetti Island (also known as "Deset"), located in the southern part of the lake, is considered the lowest-lying island in the world.

Unlike other saline lakes in Ethiopia (e.g., Lakes Abijatta, Shala, and Chitu), the pH of Lake Afrera is low and in the acidic range. Although little studied, a few species of fish are hosted by Lake Afrera, including two endemics: Danakilia franchettii (a cichlid) and Aphaniops stiassnyae (syn. Lebias stiassnyae; a pupfish).

== Salt extraction ==
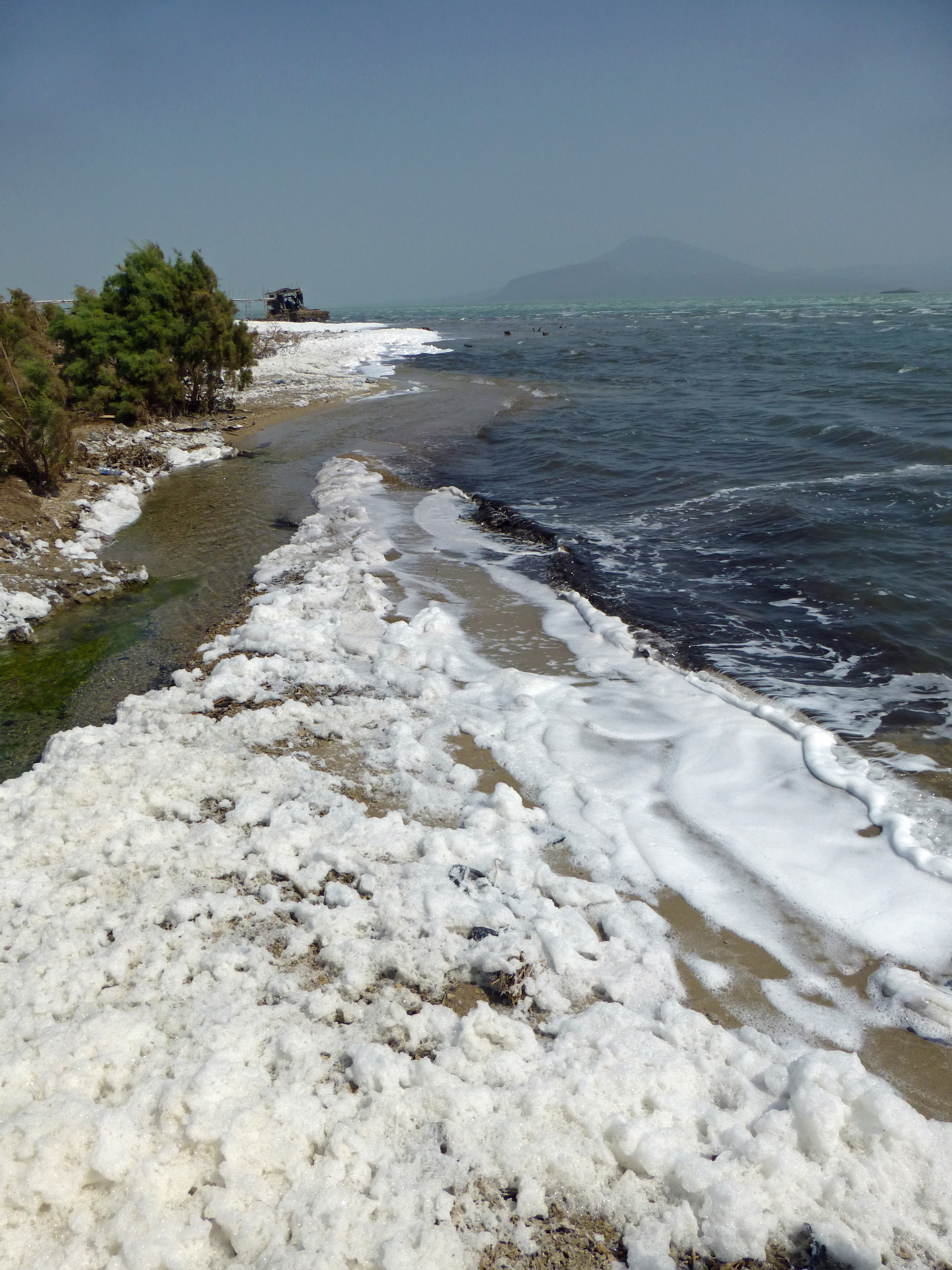
Salt on the shore of Lake Afrera

Rock salt has been mined at Lake Afrera, and the surrounding part of the Afar Depression, for centuries. Lt. Lefebvre recorded some of the hazards of mining salt from the Depression, which he heard from one of the miners himself:

He said that this lake often changes its shape and place, which he expressed in these terms: the lake moves. Often, he added, on going to a place which the evening before was quite solid, you suddenly break through, and disappear in the abyss. But what is more frightful is the overflow of the waters: sometimes the lake rises like a mountain, and falls again into the plain like a deluge; entire caravans, men and beasts are engulphed. There are, however, precursory signs, of which mounted men only can take advantage, by flying at the utmost speed of the animals; occasionally some of them have thus escaped, and it is from them these terrible details are procured.

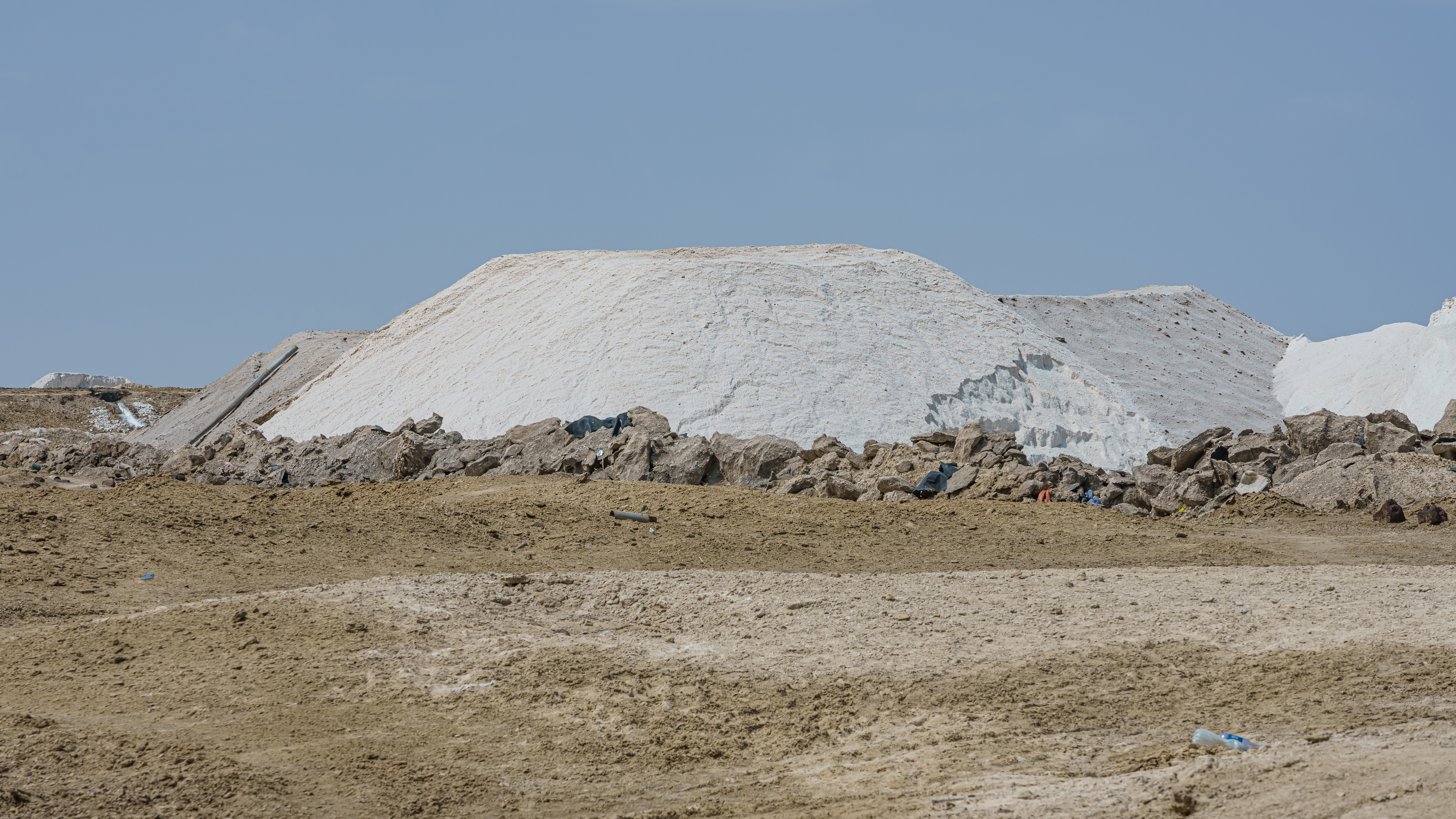
Salt production at Lake Afrera

More recently, the Ethiopian Mineral Resources Development Enterprise has established the existence of 290 million tons of salt at Lake Afrera alone. Some local companies used to produce salt from the lake by pumping the brine into artificial ponds for evaporation and subsequent precipitation.

Following the 2011 eruption of Nabro, the lake is contaminated with sulfuric acid, making the salt inedible.

== Geology ==
The depression filled by Lake Afdera was formed by faults oriented in several directions linking the Erta Ale Volcanic Range, the Tat'Ali volcanic range, and Alayta volcanic range. Furthermore, a circular depression in the southern basin is interpreted to possibly represent a volcanic caldera.

== Water source ==
Lake Afdera is fed by numerous hot springs around the lake and, possibly, by underwater springs. The waters of lake Afdera are saline but do not come from the sea. The continental waters gained their salinity by hydrothermal reactions with evaporites and basalts in the underground. The lake level varied significantly in the last tens of thousands of years. During the African Humid Period, the lake level was 50m higher than today and covered much larger area. Since the 1960s' the lake level constantly fluctuated, but these variations were probably less than one meter in amplitude. This suggest that the lake level is controlled by climate and precipitations on the Ethiopian plateau or in the Danakil Alps.

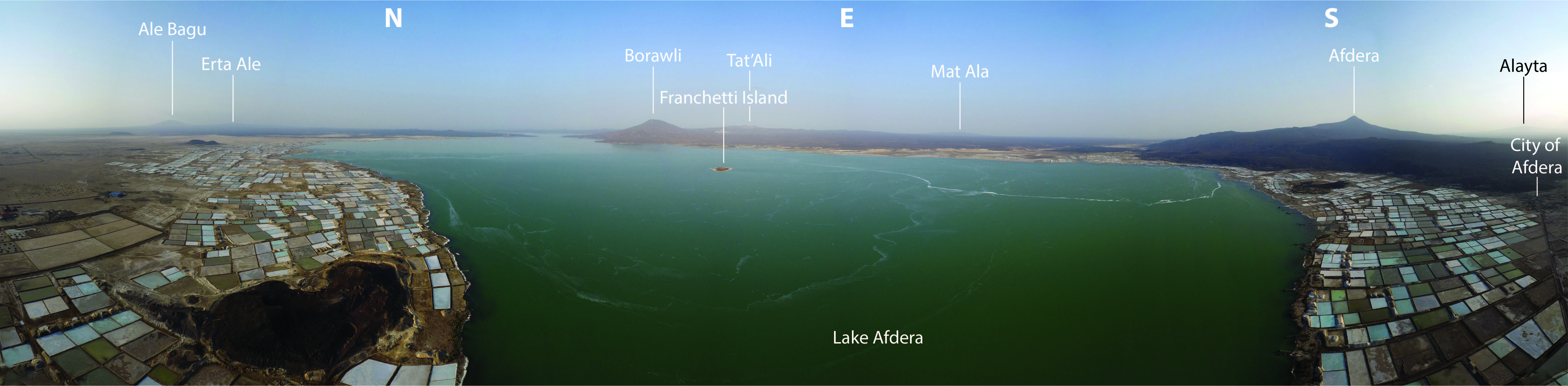
Drone view of Lake Afdera, showing the salt ponds and the surrounding volcanos.

== See also ==
- Lake Karum
- Lake Assal
