= Alid Volcano =

Volcano in Eritrea

Alid
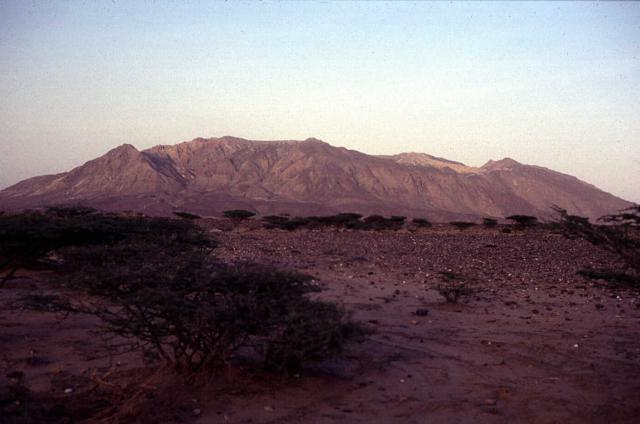

Highest point
- Elevation: 904 m (2,966 ft)
- Listing: Volcanoes of Eritrea
- Coordinates: 14°53′N 39°55′E

Geography
- Location within Eritrea
- Location: Northern Red Sea region, Eritrea

Geology
- Mountain type: Stratovolcano
- Rock types: Rhyolite, Basalt, Andesite, Trachyandesite and Trachyte
- Last eruption: Unknown

The Alid Volcano is a stratovolcano located in the Northern Red Sea region of Eritrea in the Danakil Depression. The peak elevation from its base is 904 metres (2,966 ft). The volcano's most recent activity was identified in 1928, when it emitted smoke. It is a large volcano located in the northern east coast.

== See also ==
- List of stratovolcanoes
