= Dubbi Volcano =

Dubbi
- Location within Eritrea

Highest point
- Elevation: 1,625 m (5,331 ft)
- Coordinates: 13°34′48″N 41°48′29″E

Geography
- Location: Southern Red Sea region, Eritrea

Geology
- Mountain type: Stratovolcano
- Last eruption: May to October 1861

The Dubbi Volcano is a stratovolcano located in the Southern Red Sea Region of Eritrea. Its peak elevation is 1,625 m (5,331 ft). There have been four known eruptions. In 1400 lava was determined to have reached the Red Sea while in 1861 ash was thrown over 250 km (160 mi) from the volcano. Two further events were suspected between 1861 and the 20th century.

On June 13, 2011 an ash cloud that had some influence on air travel was attributed to Dubbi. However, more accurate satellite imagery later showed that Nabro was the volcano that had erupted.

== See also ==
- List of volcanoes in Eritrea
- List of stratovolcanoes
