= Bidu (woreda) =

Map of Ethiopia showing the Afar Region

The Bidu woreda is one of the Districts of Ethiopia, or woredas in the Afar Region of Ethiopia, it forms part of the Administrative Zone 2.
