= Danakil Alps =

East African highlands

Highest point
- Listing: List of mountain ranges

Dimensions
- Width: 40–70 km (25–43 mi)

Naming
- Native name: Arrata (Afar)

Geography
- Countries: Etiopia and Eritrea

Geology
- Rock age: Miocene
- Rock type: Limestone

The Danakil Alps are a highland region in Ethiopia and Eritrea with peaks over 1000 metres in height and a width varying between 40 and 70 kilometres. The area is known in the Afar language as Arrata. The alps lie along the southern Red Sea to the east of the Danakil Depression and separate it from the sea. The alps are asymmetric in cross-section with a comparatively gentle rift escarpment facing the Red Sea and intense normal faulting on the inland side.

In the northern part of the alps the basement rock is less elevated and there are many volcanic edifices, such as those forming the Nabro Volcanic Range. The largest of the Nabro Volcanic Range edifices are the Mallahle, Nabro, and Dubbi. The volcanic range extends northwestward to the Red Sea, ending with the Kod Ali volcano offshore.

The Danakil Alps have been cut off from the sea since the late Pleistocene.

== Composition ==
Geologically these highlands are described as a horst and are sometimes referred to as the Danakil Horst or Danakil Block. They were formed by geological faulting which has occurred since the Miocene epoch. There is Precambrian basement rock underlying the region and in coastal Eritrea Precambrian and Mesozoic rocks are exposed. The Antalo Limestone in the Danakil Alps is unusually thick for the Horn of Africa, being at least 1,000 metres (3,300 ft) in depth, implying that the area acted as a drainage basin before the uplift and break up of the Afro-Arabian continent. The basement rock of the alps has become overlaid with flood basalt since the Oligocene epoch. The pre-rift stratigraphic section in the Danakil Alps exceeds 4,000 metres (13,000 ft), greater than that to the north, reflecting the development of the Indian Ocean margin during the Mesozoic.

== Development ==
About 20 million years ago the Afar rift zone opened up. This resulted in the alps breaking away from the Ethiopian plateau to which they had previously been attached and drifting to the east/northeast. Paleomagnetic measurements indicate that, beginning in the early Miocene, the alps rotated counterclockwise by 20–30 degrees from their original position over a period of 11 million years as a result of the opening of the Red Sea. During the last million years, spreading has continued to propagate west from the Gulf of Aden into the Gulf of Tadjoura and into the Afar Region via the subaerially exposed Asal–Ghoubbet rift. This active plate boundary continues along the west side of the Danakil Block, and links to the Red Sea at the Gulf of Zula. Stretching factors of the continental crust in the Danakil Alps are estimated to be up to β = ~2.5.

== See also ==
- Danakil Desert
- Danakil microplate
- Erta Ale Range
