= Erebti (woreda) =

Administrative subdivision of Ethiopia

Coordinates: 13°15′N 40°20′E

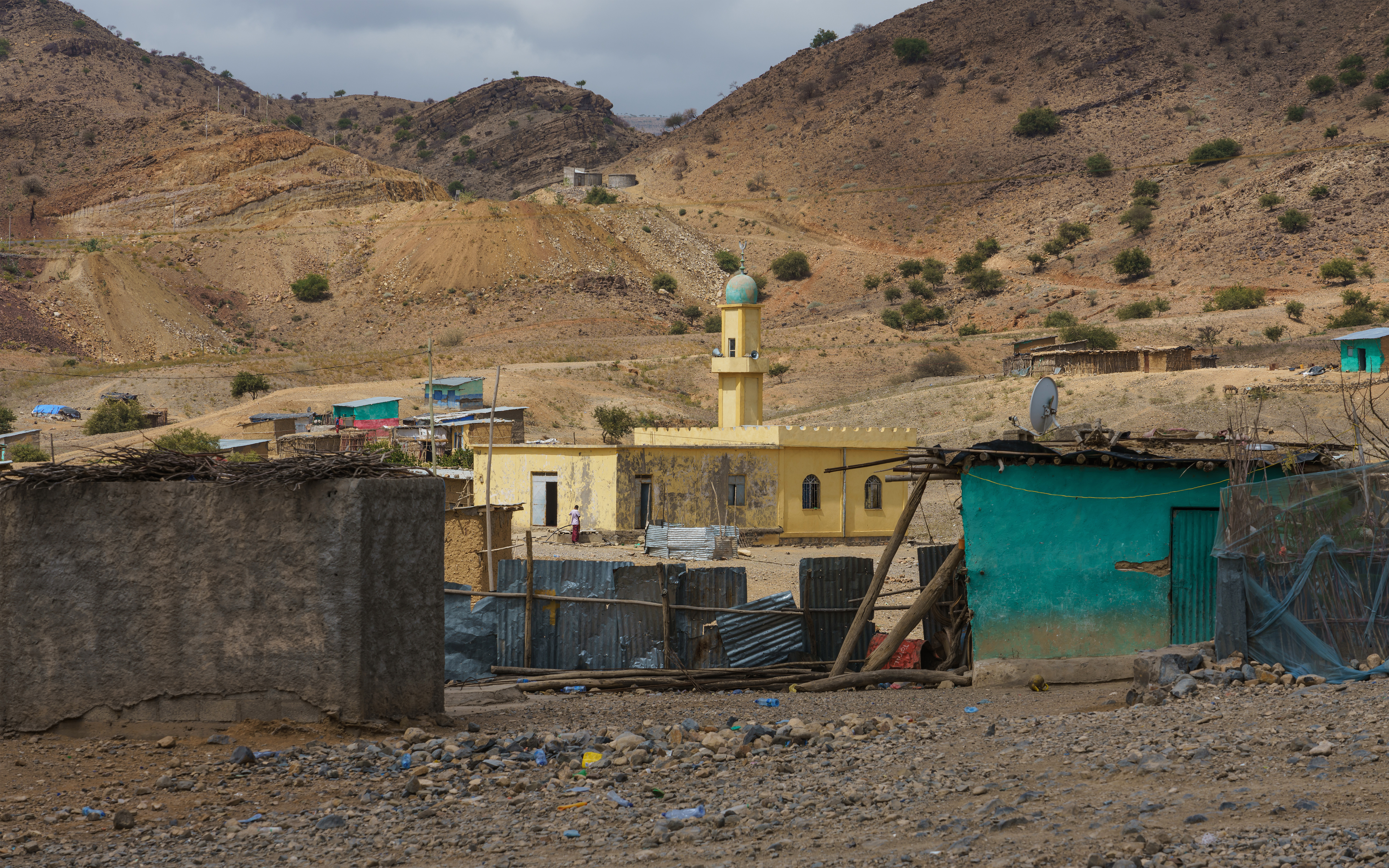
Mosque in Erebti

Erebti is one of the Districts of Ethiopia, or woredas in the Afar Region of Ethiopia. It is named after the Erebti River, a stream that flows east from the Ethiopian Highlands into the Afar Depression, part of which lies in the eastern part of this woreda. One of the woredas in the Administrative Zone 2, Erebti is bordered on the south by the Administrative Zone 4, on the southwest by Megale, on the northwest by Abala, and on the north and east by Afdera. The major town in this woreda is Erebti; other settlements include Doxom and Lakora.

The highest peak in Erebti is Ma Alalta, listed alternately at 1815 m (5954 ft) 1,745 m (5,725 ft).

A drought during June 2008 in this woreda forced 68,400 residents of 13 kebeles to relocate to the town of Erebti, although the kebeles of Haitan and Aleyta were the worst affected. Some of the displaced families have sought refuge at the farmers’ training center in Erebti while others are living in tarpaulin shelters erected nearby. Since their arrival, the villagers said, they had received rations of sorghum from the local authorities but no salt, cooking oil, pulses or non-food aid. Moreover, since the arrival of the affected populations to the town, water shortages had increased.

== Demographics ==
Based on the 2007 Census conducted by the Central Statistical Agency of Ethiopia (CSA), this woreda has a total population of 34,801, of whom 19,558 are men and 15,243 women; with an area of 2,612.32 square kilometers (1008.62 square miles), Erebti has a population density of 13.32 people per square kilometer (34.50 people per square mile). While 749 or 2.15% are urban inhabitants, a further 10,481 or 30.12% are pastoralists. A total of 5,626 households were counted in this woreda, which results in an average of 6.2 persons to a household, and 5,697 housing units. 99.64% of the population said they were Muslim.
