= Danakilia dinicolai =

Scientific classification
- Kingdom: Animalia
- Phylum: Chordata
- Class: Actinopterygii
- Order: Cichliformes
- Family: Cichlidae
- Genus: Danakilia
- Species: D. dinicolai

Binomial name
- Danakilia dinicolai Stiassny, de Marchi & Lamboj, 2010

Species of fish

Danakilia dinicolai is a species of cichlid endemic to the saline Lake Abaeded in Eritrea. The specific name honours Ernesto Di Nicola (1969-2001) who was a member of the expedition to Lake Abaeded who died in a car accident while returning from the lake.
