= Giuseppe Giulietti (trade unionist) =

Italian politician

Giuseppe Giulietti (21 May 1879 in Rimini – 20 June 1953 in Rome) was an Italian sailor who became a leading trade union activist. He was one of the few figures ostensibly on the left wing of Italian politics to publicly support Benito Mussolini, declaring for the fascist leader in 1922.

== Life ==
Giulietti became a seaman in 1905 and soon became a leading figure in their union Federazione Italiana dei Lavoratori del Mare (FILM), where he gained a reputation as a strong negotiator and was appointed union president in 1910. Having joined the Italian Socialist Party in 1903 he affiliated FILM to the party once appointed president.

He saw service with the Regia Marina during the First World War and during his service he became more nationalist in thought. He soon took to using FILM funds to secretly fund Il Popolo d'Italia, the newspaper of Benito Mussolini (at the time still considered a Socialist Party dissident), and followed the rightwards shift of that group. He soon became a public supporter of Gabriele d'Annunzio and worked to aid his endeavours in the Free State of Fiume. To this end he hijacked a ship, Persia, carrying weapons to the White Russians and diverted them to Fiume. Giulietti criticised other socialists for failing to take advantage of the opportunities offered by d'Annunzio, arguing that even if they did not support him they could have taken advantage of the chaos he created to launch their own revolution. Despite this, the two split in 1924 when d'Annunzio, under pressure from industrialist backers who feared Giulletti's socialist background, repudiated their alliance.

Despite his declared support for Mussolini, Giulietti found Fascist Italy a difficult prospect and throughout the early 1920s he maintained links to the left as well as the fascists. He was unpopular with the fascists in his home city of Genoa and in November 1926 they had him arrested and sent into 'exile' in Nuoro. During the remainder of the fascist period he continued to be active on behalf of the seamen, although he also garnered a reputation for corruption and misappropriation of funds during this period. He faced no charges after the Second World War despite his early involvement in fascism.

After the war Giulietti continued his activism with FILM and also entered formal politics, being elected to the Italian Chamber of Deputies for the Italian Republican Party in the 1948 election. In 1949 he became a member of the confederal executive of the Italian General Confederation of Labour, a position he held until death.
