= Giuseppe Maria Giulietti =

Giuseppe Maria Giulietti (28 December 1847 – 25 May 1881) was an Italian soldier, geographer and explorer. He was born in a wealthy family in Casteggio, province of Pavia.

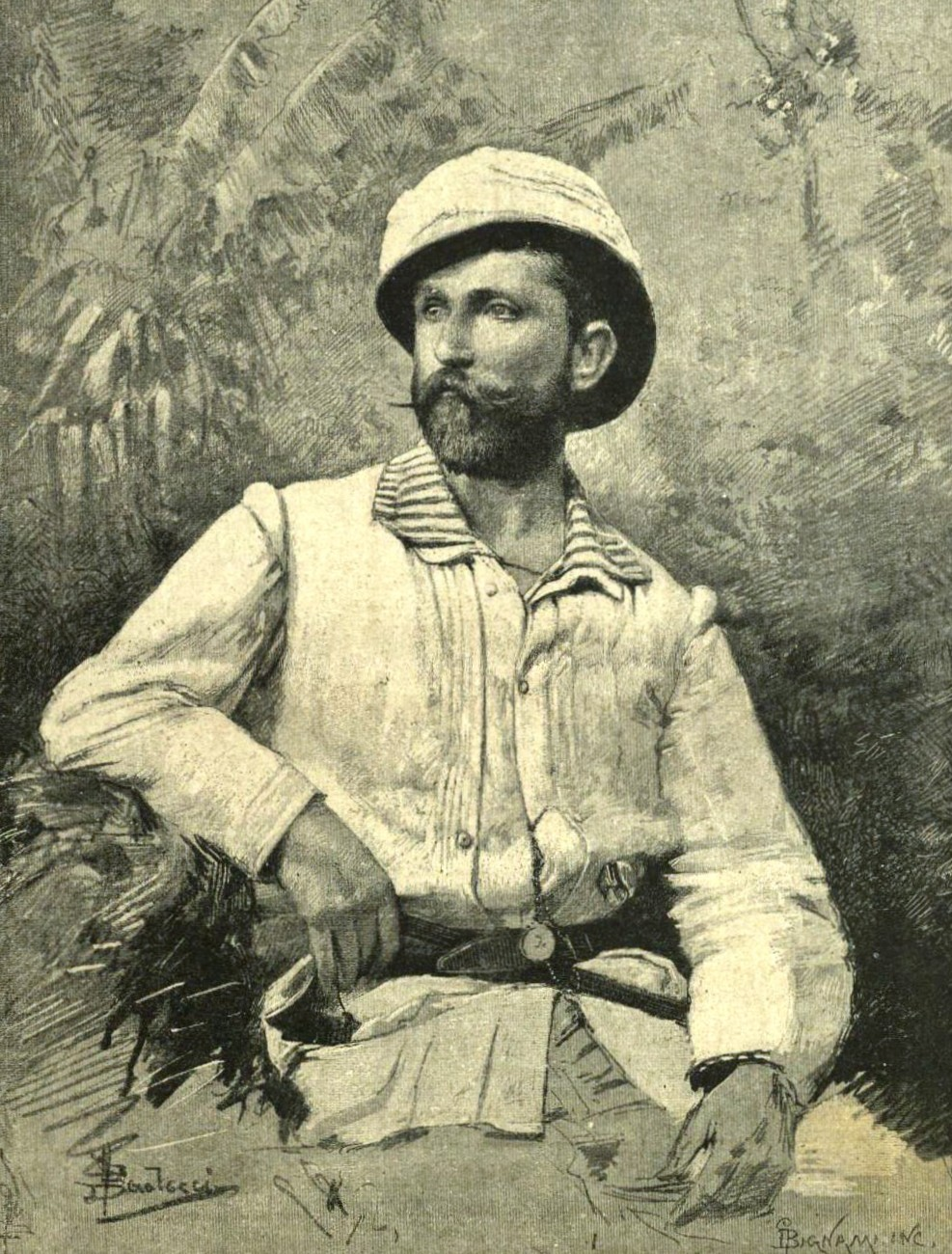
Giuseppe Maria Giulietti

He enrolled in the Corpo Volontari Italiani (Italian Volunteers Corps) which fought against the Austrians in 1866, during the Italian independence wars. Later he was called by Giacomo Doria for his expedition to save the Antinori expedition in Shewa, a principality of Ethiopia.

Afterwards he led several explorations in that country. During the last of them, he was killed by the Afar tribes, together with Ettore Biglieri and thirty-one seamen of the ship Ettore Fieramosca in the southern Afar Depression. The location of the massacre was identified by L.M. Nesbitt and his two Italian associates as the Tio waterhole in 1928, who erected a cairn to mark the spot. The explorers were then threatened by the local Afar who believed that they would then exact revenge for the deaths over a generation ago, and Nesbitt was able to talk their way out of certain death only with great difficulty.

In his memory, Raimondo Franchetti named the lake he discovered in 1929 "Lake Giulietti" (also known as Lake Afrera).

Giulietti's memoirs were published in 1882.
