= Raimondo Franchetti =

Italian baron

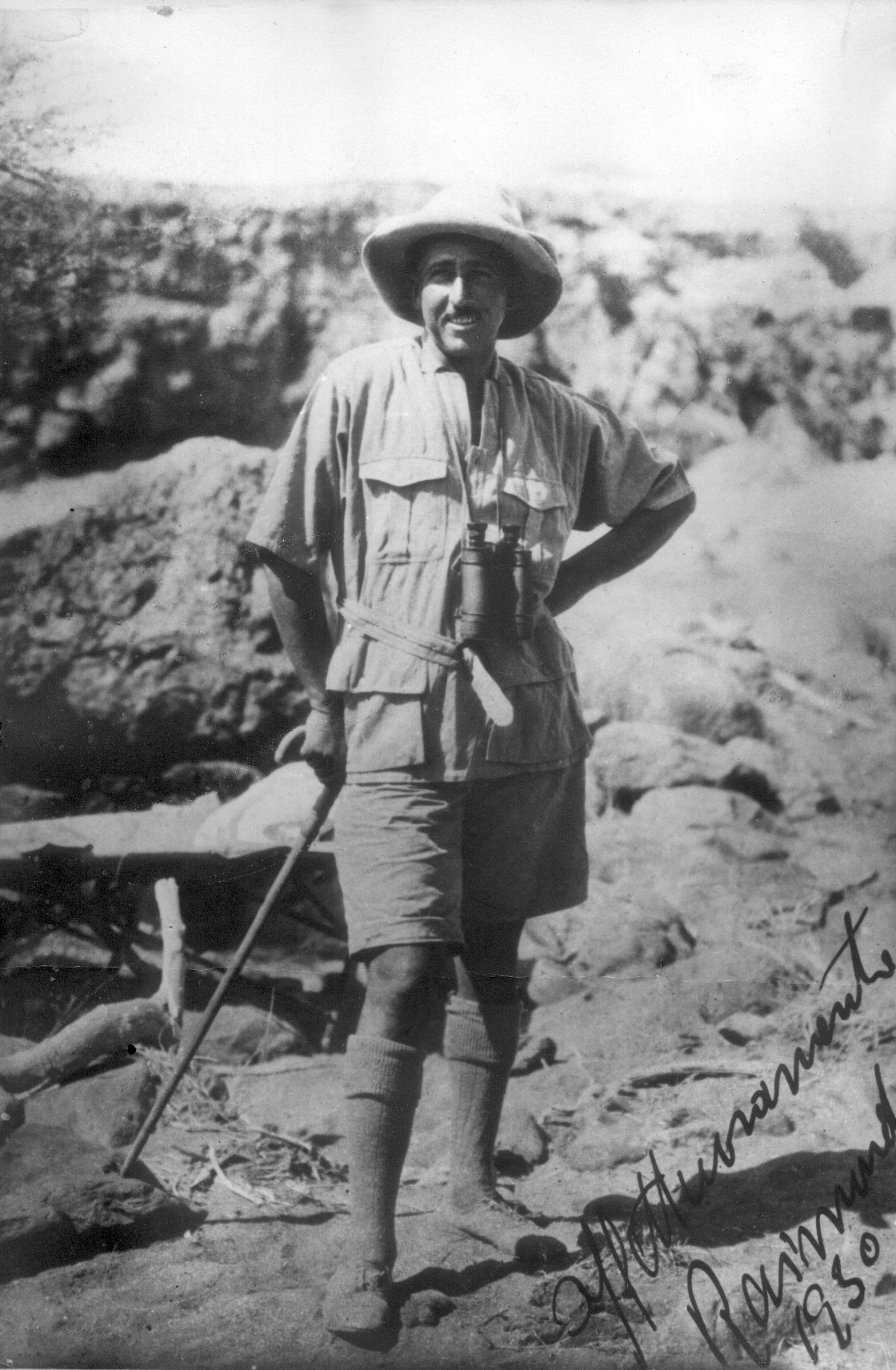
Raimondo Franchetti in the Afar Triangle, 1930

Baron Raimondo Franchetti has been the name of more than one Italian Baron, of the noble Franchetti family. The Franchettis were an Italian Jewish family who, from the 18th century onwards, were one of the wealthiest families in the Mediterranean. They were originally a Mantuan family. The most famous member of the family named Baron Raimondo Franchetti lived from 1889 until his death in an airplane crash in Cairo in 1935 with a group of Italians, including Luigi Razza, minister of public works in the cabinet of Benito Mussolini.

== Family ==
His grandfather, also Baron Raimondo Franchetti, married Louise Sarah Rothschild into the Rothschild banking family.
