= Lake Karum =

Salt lake in Afar Region, Ethiopia

- Lake Asale
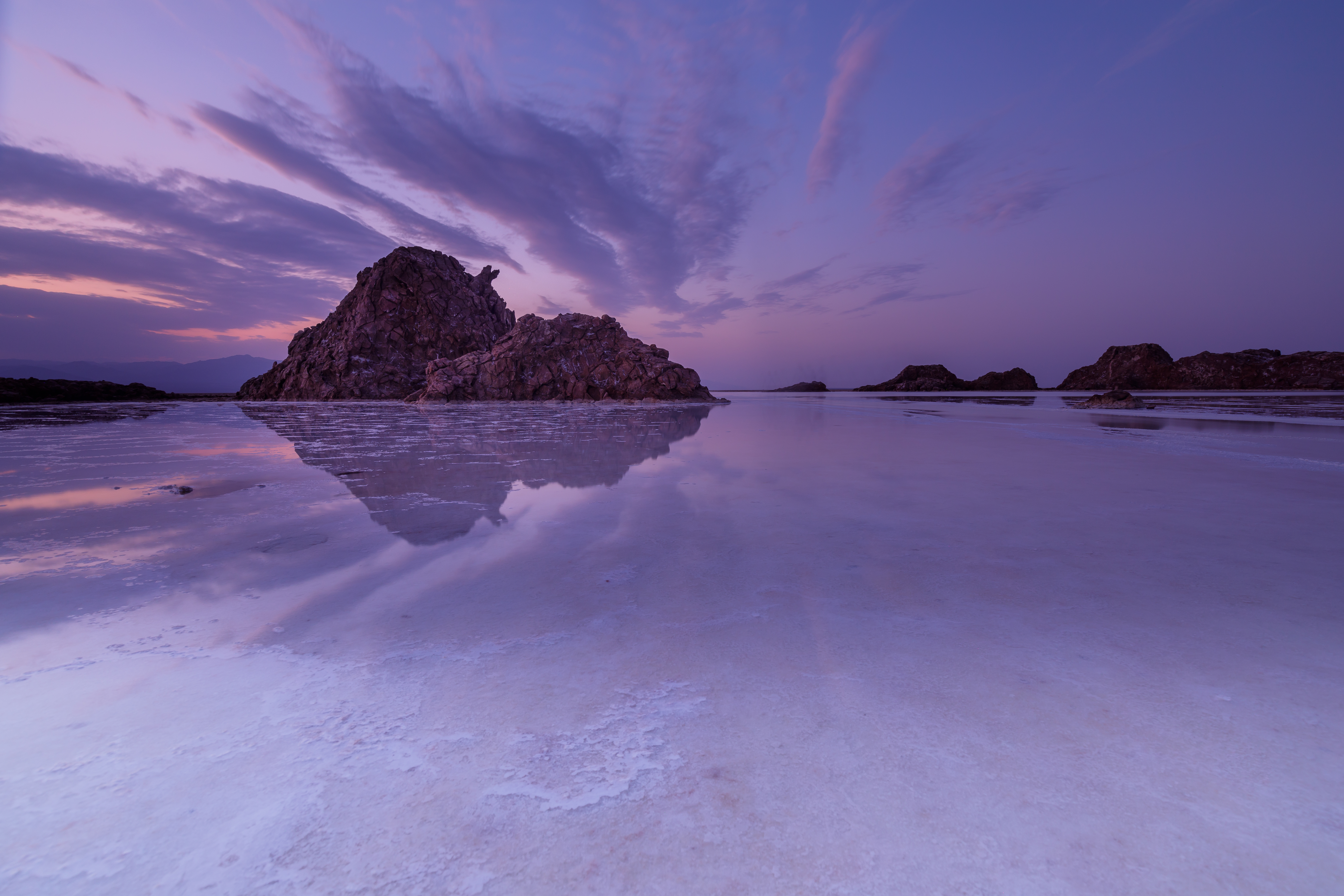
- Lake Karum/Assale at sunset

- Location within Ethiopia
- Interactive map of Lake Karum
- Location: Afar Region
- Coordinates: 14°1′N 40°25′E
- Type: salt lake
- Basin countries: Ethiopia
- Surface elevation: −120 m (−394 ft)

Lake Karum (also known as Lake Assale or Asale) is a salt lake in the Afar Region of Ethiopia. One of two salt lakes in the northern end of the Danakil Depression (the other one being Lake Afrera), it lies 120 m (394 ft) below sea level. The volcano Erta Ale rises southeast of this lake.

Werner Munzinger, who traveled through the Afar Depression in 1867, recorded that this lake was fed by four streams: The Didic, the Ala, the Rira Guddy, and the Ragali or Awra, which is the only permanent stream flowing into Lake Karum.

North of Lake Karum is the former mining-settlement of Dallol. The lake is extremely salty and is surrounded by a salt-pan, which is still mined. The salt is transported by caravan to the rest of the country.

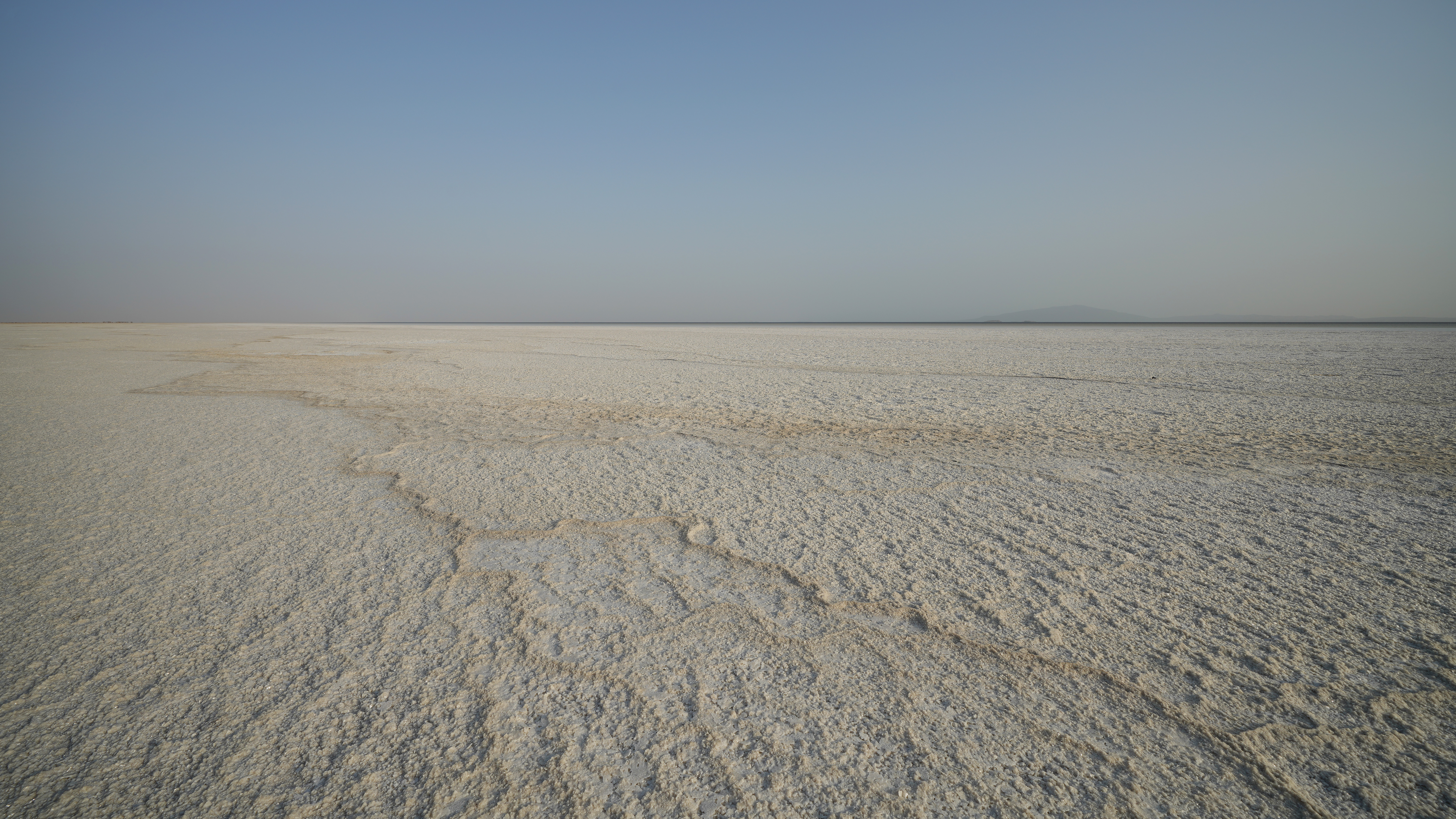
Salt flat at Lake Karum

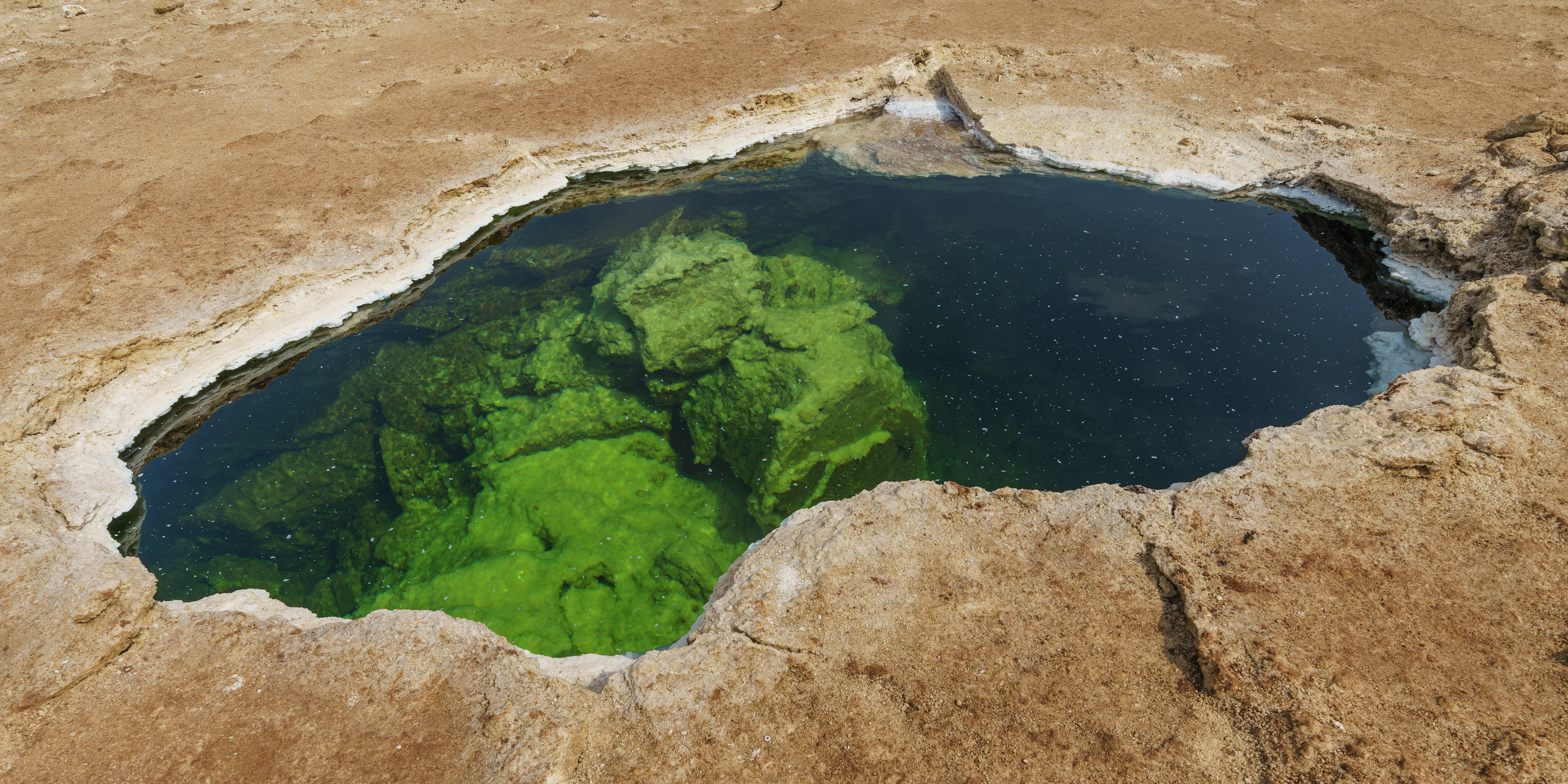
Water of Lake Karum, visible through a hole in the salt flat

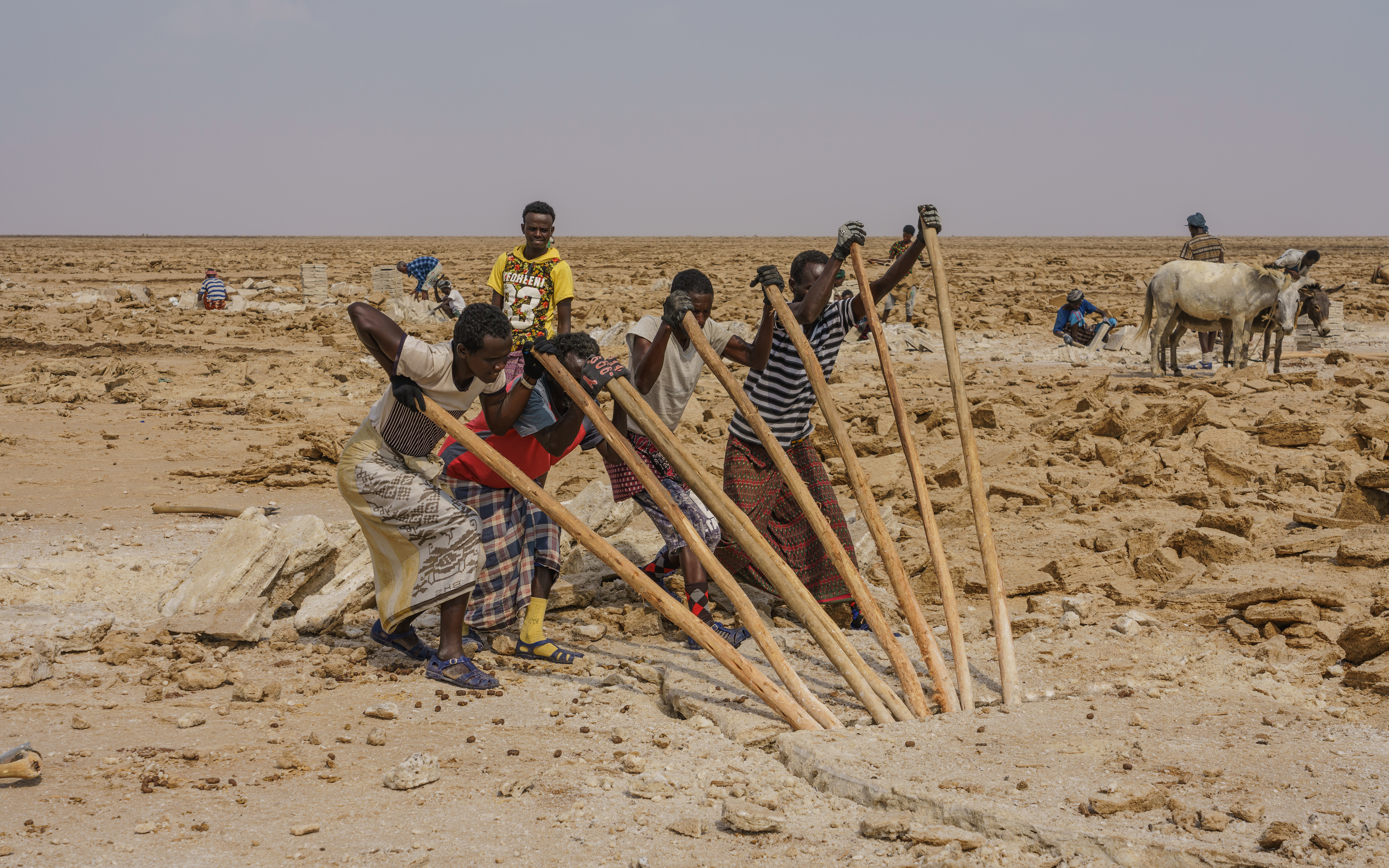
Salt workers at work

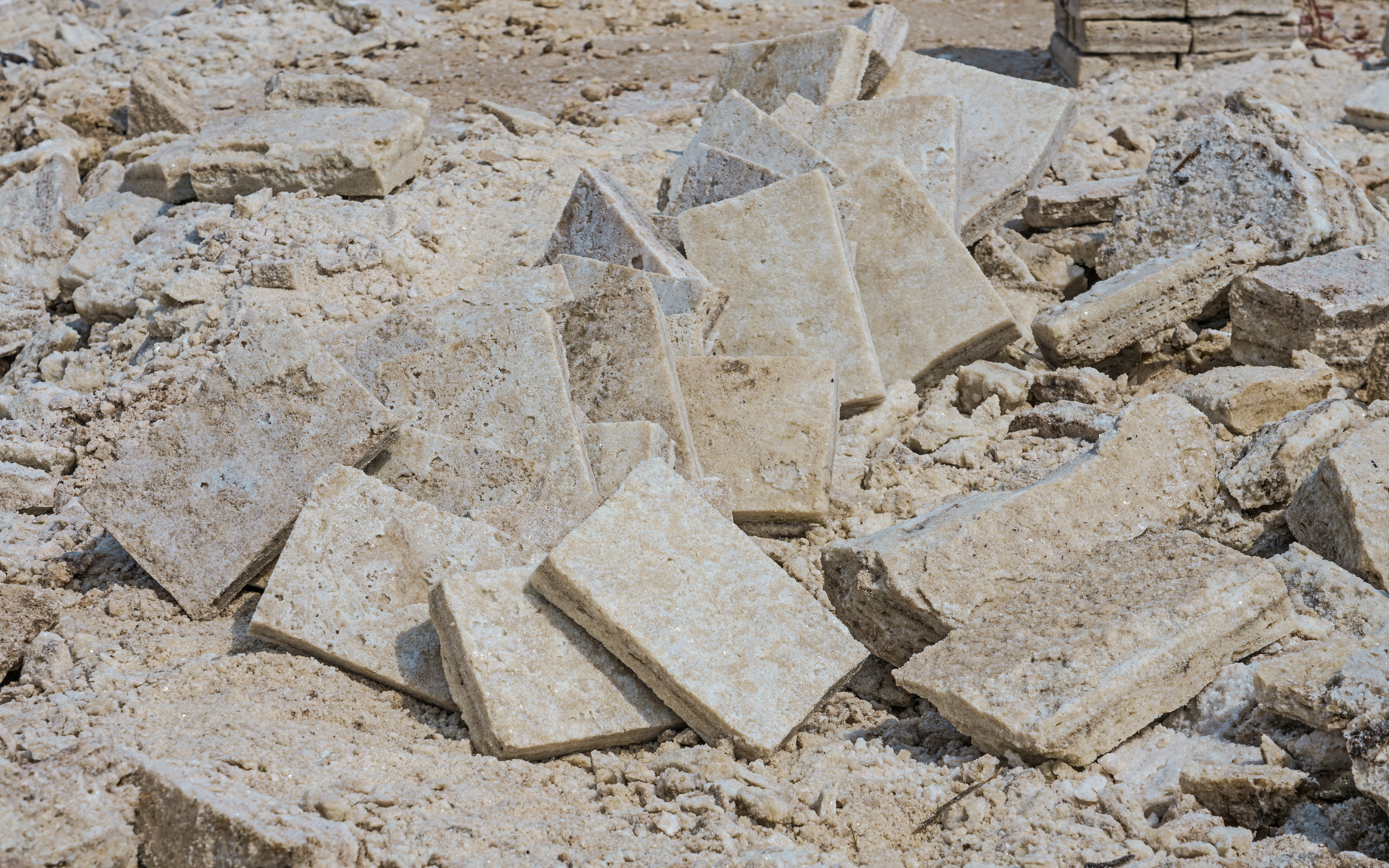
Processed salt

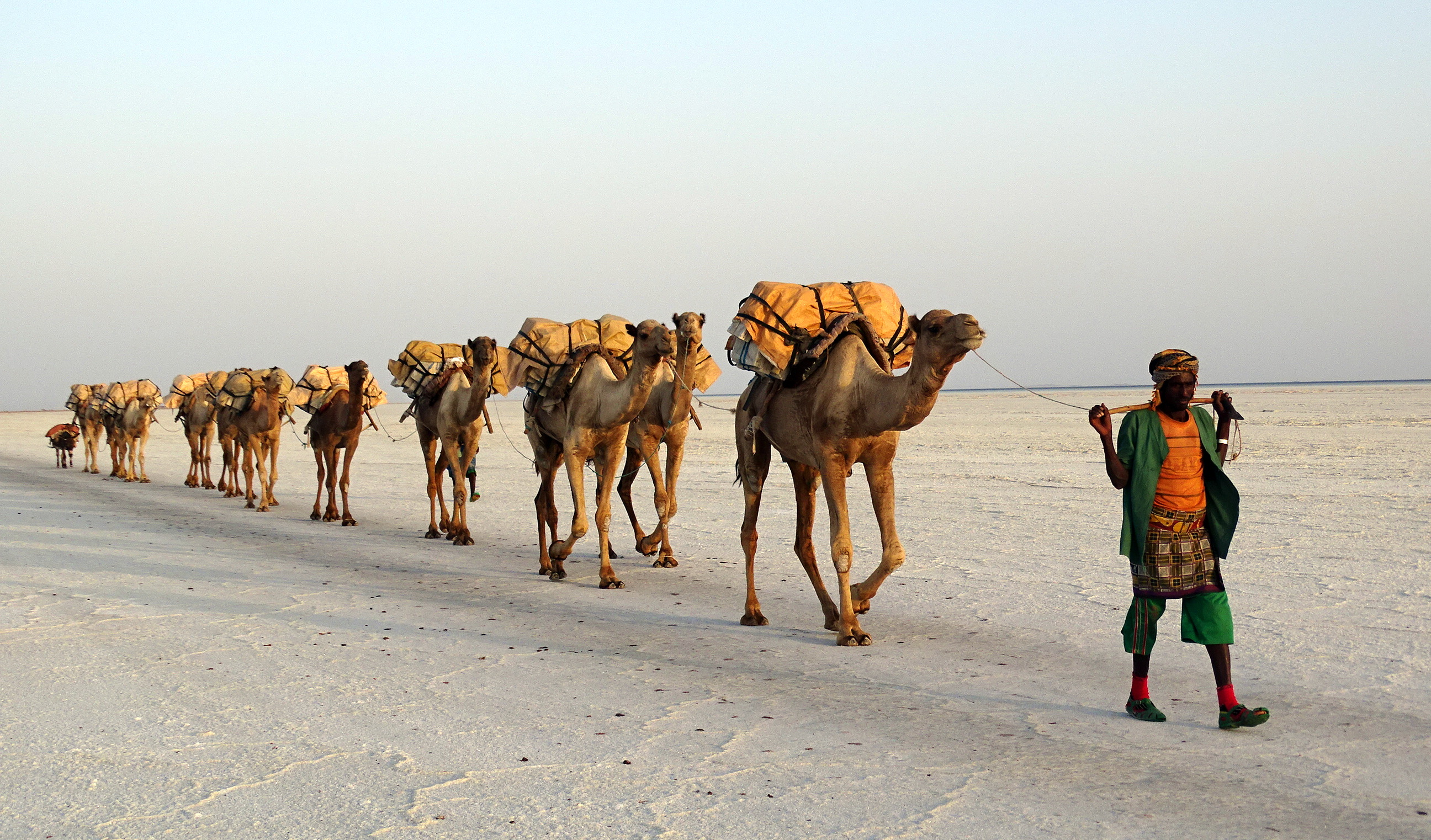
Salt transport by a camel train

== See also ==
- Lake Afrera
- Lake Assal (Djibouti)
