= Nabro Volcano =

Active volcano in Eritrea

Nabro
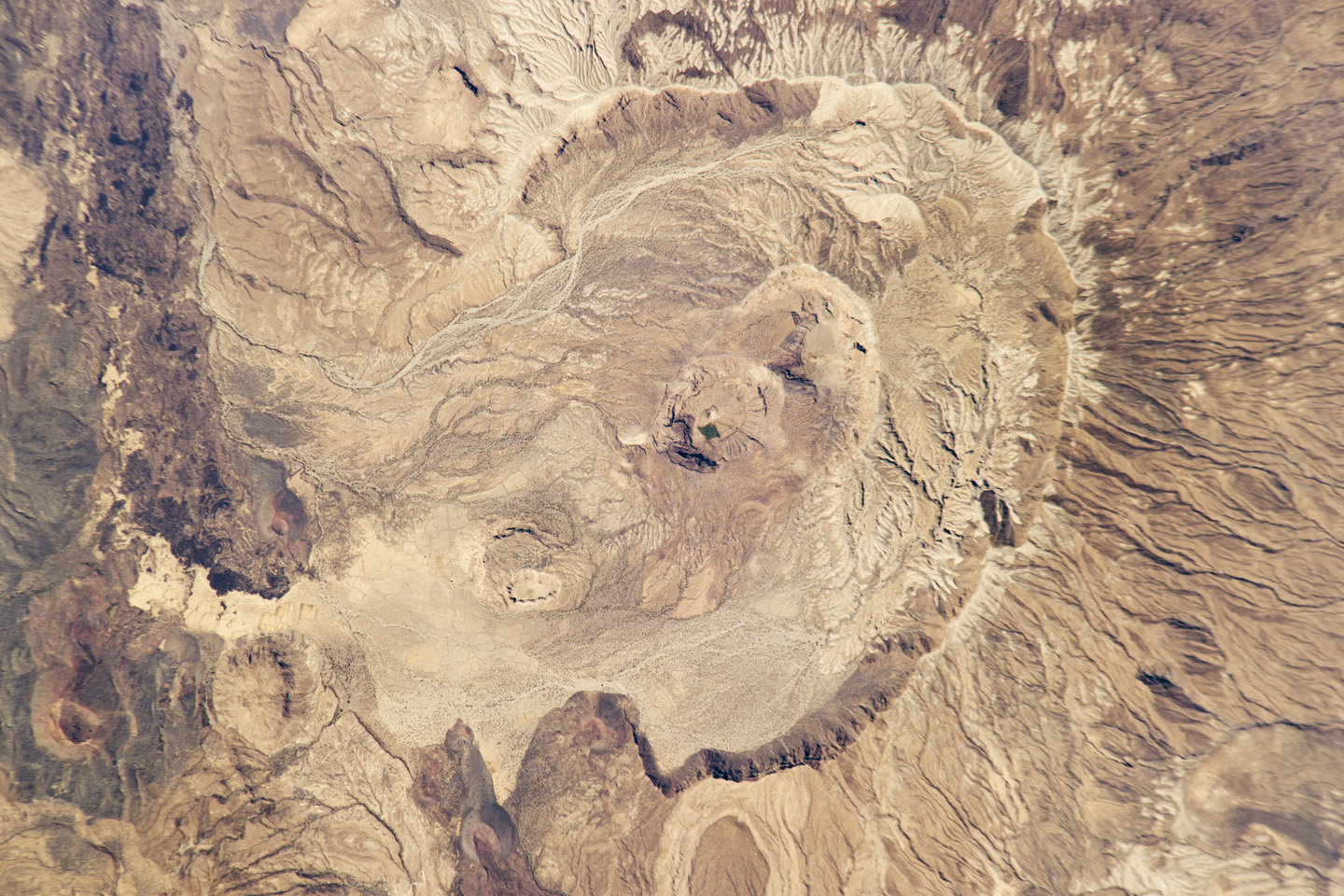
- ISS astronaut photo of Nabro, taken 4½ months before the June 2011 eruption

Highest point
- Elevation: 2,218 m (7,277 ft)
- Coordinates: 13°22′N 41°42′E

Geography
- Location within Eritrea
- Location: Southern Red Sea Region, Eritrea

Geology
- Mountain type: Stratovolcano
- Last eruption: 2011 to 2012

The Nabro Volcano is an active stratovolcano in the Southern Red Sea Region of Eritrea. It is located at the south-east end of the Danakil Alps in the Danakil Depression. Before its 2011 eruption, the volcano was widely believed to be extinct.

== Geology ==
Part of the Afar Triangle, the Nabro Volcano is one of many volcanic caldera complexes in the northeasternmost part of the East African Rift valley region. The twin calderas likely formed during an eruption of about 20 to 100 cubic kilometres consisting of ignimbrite, although the date of their formation is unknown. The subaerial volume of volcanic material within the Nabro Volcanic Range is likely on the order of 550 km^{3} (130 mi^{3}).

== 2011 eruption ==
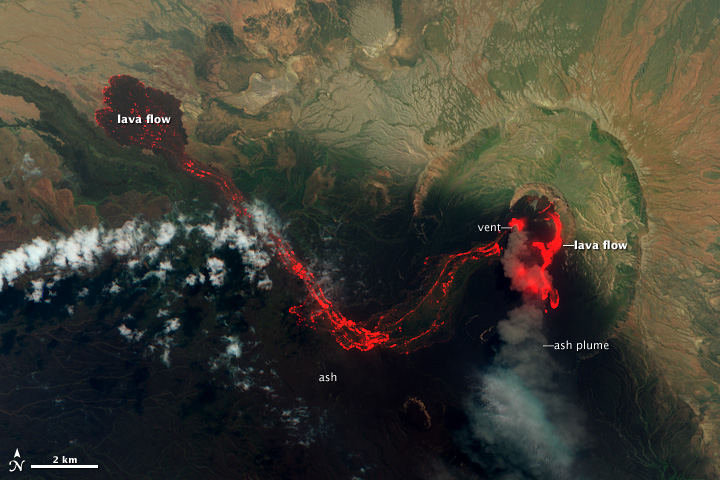
Lava flows at Nabro Volcano, June 29, 2011

Although it had undergone no historically reported eruptions, the Nabro Volcano erupted shortly after midnight local time on 13 June 2011, after a series of earthquakes up to magnitude 5.7 in the Eritrea-Ethiopia border region. The ash plume was seen on satellite drifting to the west-northwest along the border, spanning about 50 km wide and several hundred kilometres across in the hours immediately following the reported eruption, and reportedly reaching 15 km (9.3 mi) high.

On June 13, US Secretary of State Hillary Clinton had to cut short a trip to Ethiopia due to the ash cloud, which was projected to enter a west-to-east jetstream and enter the atmosphere of countries such as Egypt, Yemen, Israel, Iraq, Jordan, Sudan, Somalia, Djibouti and Saudi Arabia.

The ash cloud began disrupting air traffic as UAE-based Emirates flights were cancelled along with Saudi Arabian Airlines flights. Luxor International Airport in Luxor, Egypt was placed on a state of emergency.

== 2012 eruptive activity ==
The MODVOLC noted on the 9 April 2012 that a thermal anomaly was detected at Nabro and that such anomalies had been detected throughout March. The activity is focused on the Southern Caldera wall. The exact nature of the activity is unknown, but activolcans.info noted that there might be a lava lake there.

== See also ==
- List of volcanoes in Eritrea
- List of stratovolcanoes
