= Lists of extreme points =

This is a list of lists of places considered the most extreme by virtue of meeting some superlative geographical or physical criterion – e.g. farthest, highest, lowest, greatest, or least.

== Earth ==
- Extremes on Earth
- Northernmost settlements
- Southernmost settlements
- List of northernmost items
- List of southernmost items
- List of countries by highest point
- List of countries by lowest point
- List of elevation extremes by country
- List of elevation extremes by region
- List of highest towns by country

== Continents ==
- Extreme points of Afro-Eurasia
  - Extreme points of Africa
  - Extreme points of Eurasia
    - Extreme points of Europe
    - Extreme points of Asia
- Extreme points of the Americas
  - Extreme points of North America
    - Extreme points of the Caribbean
    - Extreme points of Central America
  - Extreme points of South America
- Extreme points of Oceania
  - Extreme points of Australia
- Extreme points of Antarctica
  - Extreme points of the Antarctic
- Extreme points of the Arctic

== Sovereign states ==
- Extreme points of Afghanistan
- Extreme points of Albania
- Extreme points of Algeria
- Extreme points of Andorra
- Extreme points of Angola
- Extreme points of Argentina
- Extreme points of Australia
- Extreme points of Austria
- Extreme points of Azerbaijan
- Extreme points of Bangladesh
- Extreme points of Belarus
- Extreme points of Belgium
- Extreme points of Benin
- Extreme points of Botswana
- Extreme points of Brazil
- Extreme points of Bulgaria
- Extreme points of Burkina Faso
- Extreme points of Burundi
- Extreme points of Cameroon
- Extreme points of Canada
- Extreme points of Cape Verde
- Extreme points of Central African Republic
- Extreme points of Chad
- Extreme points of Chile
- Extreme points of China
- Extreme points of the Democratic Republic of the Congo
- Extreme points of the Republic of Congo
- Extreme points of Côte d'Ivoire
- Extreme points of Croatia
- Extreme points of Cyprus
- Extreme points of the Czech Republic
- Extreme points of Denmark
- Extreme points of Djibouti
- Extreme points of Egypt
- Extreme points of Equatorial Guinea
- Extreme points of Eritrea
- Extreme points of Estonia
- Extreme points of Ethiopia
- Extreme points of Fiji
- Extreme points of Finland
- Extreme points of France
- Extreme points of Gabon
- Extreme points of the Gambia
- Extreme points of Germany
- Extreme points of Ghana
- Extreme points of Greece
- Extreme points of Guinea
- Extreme points of Guinea-Bissau
- Extreme points of Hungary
- Extreme points of Iceland
- Extreme points of India
- Extreme points of Indonesia
- Extreme points of Iran
- Extreme points of Ireland
- Extreme points of Italy
- Extreme points of Japan
- Extreme points of Kenya
- Extreme points of Kiribati
- Extreme points of Latvia
- Extreme points of Lesotho
- Extreme points of Liberia
- Extreme points of Libya
- Extreme points of Liechtenstein
- Extreme points of Lithuania
- Extreme points of Luxembourg
- Extreme points of Madagascar
- Extreme points of Malawi
- Extreme points of Mali
- Extreme points of Malta
- Extreme points of the Marshall Islands
- Extreme points of Mexico
- Extreme points of the Federated States of Micronesia
- Extreme points of Moldova
- Extreme points of Monaco
- Extreme points of Montenegro
- Extreme points of Morocco
- Extreme points of Mozambique
- Extreme points of Namibia
- Extreme points of Nauru
- Extreme points of the Netherlands
- Extreme points of New Zealand
- Extreme points of Niger
- Extreme points of Nigeria
- Extreme points of Norway
- Extreme points of Pakistan
- Extreme points of Palau
- Extreme points of Peru
- Extreme points of the Philippines
- Extreme points of Poland
- Extreme points of Portugal
- Extreme points of Romania
- Extreme points of Russia
- Extreme points of Rwanda
- Extreme points of San Marino
- Extreme points of São Tomé and Príncipe
- Extreme points of Senegal
- Extreme points of Serbia
- Extreme points of Seychelles
- Extreme points of Sierra Leone
- Extreme points of Singapore
- Extreme points of Slovakia
- Extreme points of Slovenia
- Extreme points of Somalia
- Extreme points of South Africa
- Extreme points of Spain
  - Extreme points of Catalonia
- Extreme points of Sri Lanka
- Extreme points of Sudan
- Extreme points of Swaziland
- Extreme points of Sweden
- Extreme points of Switzerland
- Extreme points of Tanzania
- Extreme points of Thailand
- Extreme points of Togo
- Extreme points of Tunisia
- Extreme points of Turkey
- Extreme points of Tuvalu
- Extreme points of Uganda
- Extreme points of Ukraine
- Extreme points of the United Kingdom
  - Extreme points of England
  - Extreme points of Scotland
  - Extreme points of Wales
  - Extreme points of Northern Ireland
- Extreme points of the United States
- Extreme points of Vatican City
- Extreme points of Western Sahara
- Extreme points of Zambia
- Extreme points of Zimbabwe

=== Dependencies, autonomies, and other territories ===
- Extreme points of the Faroe Islands
- Extreme points of Greenland
- Extreme points of Guam
- Extreme points of Niue
- Extreme points of Northern Cyprus
- Extreme points of the Northern Mariana Islands
- Extreme points of Taiwan
- Extreme points of Western Sahara

=== Miscellaneous political subdivisions ===
- Extreme points of the Commonwealth of Nations
- Extreme points of the African Union
- Extreme points of the British Isles
- Extreme points of Canadian provinces
  - Extreme communities of Canada
- Extreme points of the European Union
- Extreme points of New England
- Extreme points of U.S. states

== Space ==
- List of Solar System extremes
- List of extrasolar planet extremes
- List of hottest stars
- List of largest cosmic structures
- List of largest known stars
- List of most massive black holes
- List of most massive stars
- List of most luminous stars

== See also ==
- World record
