= Extremes on Earth =

This article lists extreme locations on Earth that hold geographical records or are otherwise known for their geophysical or meteorological superlatives. All of these locations are Earth-wide extremes; extremes of individual continents or countries are not listed.

== Latitude and longitude ==
=== Northernmost ===
- The northernmost point of land is the northern tip of Kaffeklubben Island, north of Greenland (83°40′N 29°50′W), which lies slightly north of Cape Morris Jesup, Greenland (83°38′N 32°40′W). Various shifting gravel bars lie farther north, the most famous being Oodaaq. There have been other islands more northern such as 83-42 and ATOW1996 but they have not been confirmed as permanent.

=== Southernmost ===
- The southernmost continental point of land outside Antarctica is in South America at Cape Froward, Magallanes Region, Chile (53°53′34.6″S 71°18′23.1″W).
- The southernmost point of (liquid) water is a bay on the Filchner–Ronne Ice Shelf along the coast of Antarctica (83°S 59°W), about 100 km (60 mi) south of Berkner Island.
  - The southernmost point of ocean is located on the Gould Coast (84°30′S 150°0′W).
  - The southernmost point of open ocean is in the Bay of Whales, also part of the Ross Sea, at 78°30'S, at the edge of the Ross Ice Shelf.
    - The southernmost island is considered to be Deverall Island, near the Shackleton Coast, surrounded by the Ross Ice Shelf although there is an island in Lake Vostok but it is currently under ice.

=== Easternmost and westernmost ===
- The easternmost and westernmost points on Earth, based on the east–west standard for describing longitude, can be found anywhere along the 180th meridian, which passes through the Arctic, Pacific, and Southern Oceans, as well as parts of Siberia (including Wrangel Island), Antarctica, and three islands of Fiji (Vanua Levu's eastern peninsula, the middle of Taveuni, and the western part of Rabi Island).
  - Using instead the path of the International Date Line (which is not a straight line), i.e. define "easternmost" as "the first to see a new day" and define "westernmost" as "the last to see a new day", the westernmost point on land is Attu Island, Alaska, and the easternmost point on land is Caroline Island, Kiribati. (Note: A 1995 realignment of the International Date Line Archived 28 June 2006 at the Wayback Machine moved all of Kiribati to the Asian side of the Date Line, causing Caroline Island to be the easternmost point. If the previous Date Line were followed, the easternmost point would be Tafahi Niuatoputapu, in the Tonga Islands.)

=== Longest grid lines ===
==== Along constant latitude ====
- The longest continuous east–west distance on land is 10,726 km (6,665 mi) along the latitude 48°24'53"N, from the west coast of France (Pointe de Corsen, 48°24′53″N 4°47′44″W) through Central Europe, Ukraine, Russia, Kazakhstan, Mongolia and China, to a point on the east coast of Russia (48°24′53″N 140°6′3″E).
- The longest continuous east–west distance at sea is 22,471 km (13,963 mi) along the latitude 55°59'S, south of Cape Horn, South America.
  - The longest continuous east–west distance at sea between two continents is 15,409 km (9,575 mi) along the latitude 18°39'12"N, from the coast of Hainan, China (18°39′12″N 110°15′9″E) across the Pacific Ocean to the coast of Michoacán, Mexico (18°39′12″N 103°42′6″W).

==== Along constant longitude ====
- The longest continuous north–south distance on land is 7,590 km (4,720 mi) along the meridian 99°1'30"E, from the northern tip of Siberia in the Russian Federation (76°13′6″N 99°1′30″E), through Mongolia, China, and Myanmar, to a point on the south coast of Thailand (7°53′24″N 99°1′30″E).
  - The longest in Africa is 7,417 km (4,609 mi) along the meridian 20°12'E, from the north coast of Libya (32°19′0″N 20°12′0″E), through Chad, Central African Republic, Democratic Republic of the Congo, Angola, Namibia, and Botswana, to the south coast of South Africa (34°41′30″S 20°12′0″E).
  - The longest in South America is the length 7,098 km (4,410 mi) along the meridian 70°2'W, from the north coast of Venezuela (11°30′30″N 70°2′0″W), through Colombia, Brazil, Peru, and Chile, to the southern tip of Argentina (52°33′30″S 70°2′0″W).
  - The longest in North America is 5,813 km (3,612 mi) along the meridian 97°52'30"W, from northern Canada (68°21′0″N 97°52′30″W), through the United States, to southern Mexico (16°1′0″N 97°52′30″W).
- The longest continuous north–south distance at sea is 15,986 km (9,933 mi) along the meridian 34°45'45"W, from the coast of Eastern Greenland (66°23′45″N 34°45′45″W) across the Atlantic Ocean to the Filchner-Ronne Ice Shelf, on the coast of Antarctica (77°37′0″S 34°45′45″W). The longest in the Pacific Ocean is 15,883 km (9,869 mi) along the meridian 172°8'30"W, from the coast of Siberia (64°45′0″N 172°8′30″W) to the Ross Ice Shelf in Antarctica (78°20′0″S 172°8′30″W).
- The meridian that crosses the greatest total distance on land (disregarding intervening bodies of water) is still to be determined. It is likely located in the vicinity of 22°E, which is the longest integer meridian that fits that criterion, crossing a total of 13,035 km (8,100 mi) of land through Europe (3,370 km or 2,090 mi), Africa (7,458 km or 4,634 mi), and Antarctica (2,207 km or 1,371 mi). (Note: By comparison, the meridian that passes through the Great Pyramid of Giza in Egypt (31°08'3.69"E) is 855 km (531 mi) shorter.) More than 65% of this meridian's length is located on land. The next six longest integer meridians by total distance over land are, in order:
  - 23°E: 12,953 km (8,049 mi) through Europe (3,325 km or 2,066 mi), Africa (7,415 km or 4,607 mi), and Antarctica (2,214 km or 1,376 mi)
  - 27°E: 12,943 km (8,042 mi) through Europe (3,254 km or 2,022 mi), Asia (246 km or 153 mi), Africa (7,223 km or 4,488 mi), and Antarctica (2,221 km or 1,380 mi)
  - 25°E: 12,875 km (8,000 mi) through Europe (3,344 km or 2,078 mi), Africa (7,327 km or 4,553 mi), and Antarctica (2,204 km or 1,370 mi)
  - 26°E: 12,858 km (7,990 mi) through Europe (3,404 km or 2,115 mi), Africa (7,258 km or 4,510 mi), and Antarctica (2,196 km or 1,365 mi)
  - 24°E: 12,794 km (7,950 mi) through Europe (3,263 km or 2,028 mi), Africa (7,346 km or 4,565 mi), and Antarctica (2,185 km or 1,358 mi)
  - 28°E: 12,778 km (7,940 mi) through Europe (3,039 km or 1,888 mi), Asia (388 km or 241 mi), and Africa (7,117 km or 4,422 mi)

==== Along any geodesic ====
These are the longest straight lines (Note: A geodesic is defined as the shortest route between any two points on the surface of the Earth, as measured along the surface of the Earth (rather than through the Earth's interior); they are "straight lines" only in the sense that they are plotted on an idealized two-dimensional surface of the three-dimensional Earth, neglecting changes in surface elevation. On an idealized spherical model of the Earth, geodesics are equivalent to great-circle distances measured along the arcs of great circles.) that can be drawn between any two points on the surface of the Earth and remain exclusively over land or water; the points need not lie on the same line of latitude or longitude.

- The longest continuous straight-line (great circle) path over land is 13,588 km (8,443 mi) long and spans between the West African coast near Greenville, Liberia (5°2′51.59″N 9°7′23.26″W) and a peninsula about 100 km (60 mi) northeast of Wenzhou, China (28°17′7.68″N 121°38′17.31″E), passing over the Suez Canal.
  - The longest continuous straight-line land distance solely within continental Africa is 8,402 km (5,221 mi), along a line that begins just east of Tangier, Morocco, and ends 100 km (60 mi) east of Port Elizabeth, South Africa. This line passes through Morocco, Algeria, Mali, Niger, Nigeria, Cameroon, Equatorial Guinea, Gabon, Republic of the Congo, Democratic Republic of the Congo, Angola, Namibia, Botswana, and South Africa.
  - The longest continuous straight-line land distance solely within continental Asia is 10,152 km (6,308 mi), along a line that begins on the Indian coast near Kanyakumari and ends at the Bering Sea coast of the Chukchi Peninsula in Russia. This line passes through India, Nepal, China, Mongolia, and Russia.
  - The longest continuous straight-line land distance solely within continental Europe (defining the Ural Mountains as the border between Europe and Asia) is 5,325 km (3,309 mi), along a line that begins at Cape St. Vincent, Portugal, and ends at the Urals, near the town of Perm, Russia. This line passes through Portugal, Spain, France, Germany, Poland, Lithuania, Belarus, and Russia.
  - The longest continuous straight-line land distance solely within continental North America is 7,602 km (4,724 mi), along a line that begins at Point Hope, Alaska, United States, and ends 34 km (21 mi) southwest of the town of Salina Cruz, Mexico. This line passes through Alaska, Canada, the contiguous United States, and Mexico.
  - The longest continuous straight-line land distance solely within continental South America is 7,248 km (4,504 mi), along a line that begins 10 km (6.2 mi) northeast of Puerto Cumarebo, Venezuela, and ends 80 km (50 mi) south of the town of Punta Arenas, Chile. This line passes through Venezuela, Colombia, Brazil, Peru, Chile, and Argentina.
  - The longest continuous straight-line land distance solely within continental Australia is 4,026 km (2,502 mi), along a line that begins at the southern end of Cape Range National Park in Western Australia and ends at the town of Byron Bay in New South Wales.
- There are several possible candidates for the longest continuous straight-line distance in any direction at sea, as there are many possible ways to travel along a great circle for more than the antipodic length of 19,840 km (12,330 mi). Some examples of such routes would be:
  - From the south coast of Balochistan province somewhere near Port of Karachi, Pakistan (25°25′N 66°25′E) across the Arabian Sea, southwest through the Indian Ocean, near Comoros, passing Namaete Canyon, near the South African coast, across the South Atlantic Ocean, then west across Cape Horn, then northwest across the Pacific Ocean, near Easter Island, passing the antipodal point near Emlilia island, through the South Bering Sea and ending somewhere on the northeast coast of Kamchatka, near Ossora (59°38′N 163°24′E). This route is 32,040 km (19,910 mi) long. This route was confirmed to be the longest (at about 32,090 km or 19,940 mi) given map data at a 1.8 km (1.1 mi) level of resolution. (Note: The "longest continuous straight-line distance in any direction at sea" from Karachi to Kamchatka was originally added to Wikipedia by user Muh1974 on 21 January 2010 and then confirmed by Chabukswar and Mukherjee in 2018. The source of this discovery before 2010 is unknown as of August 2022.)
  - From the south coast of Hormozgan province, Iran (25°35′N 58°22′E) across the Gulf of Oman, southeast across the Arabian Sea, passing south of Australia and New Zealand, near the Antarctic coast, then northeast across the South Pacific Ocean, passing the antipodal point and ending on the southwest coast of Mexico somewhere near Ciudad Lázaro Cárdenas (17°57′N 101°57′W). This route is 25,267 km (15,700 mi) long.
  - From Invercargill, New Zealand (46°37′S 168°59′E) across Cape Horn, then off the coast of Brazil close to Recife, passing north of Cape Verde, passing the antipodal point and ending somewhere on the southwest coast of Ireland (52°09′N 6°34′W). This route is 20,701 km (12,863 mi) long.

==== Along any diameter (straight line passing through the centre of the Earth) ====
As distinct from geodesic lines, which appear straight only when projected onto the spheroidal surface of the Earth (i.e. arcs of great circles), straight lines passing through the Earth's centre can be constructed through the interior of the Earth between almost any two points on the surface of the Earth (some extreme topographical situations such as overhanging cliffs being the rare exceptions). A line projected from the summit of Cayambe in Ecuador (see highest points) through the axial centre of the Earth to its antipode on the island of Sumatra results in the longest diameter that can be produced anywhere through the Earth. As the variable circumference of the Earth approaches 40,000 kilometres (25,000 mi), such a maximum "diameter" or "antipodal" line would be on the order of 13,000 kilometres (8,000 mi) long.

== Elevation ==
=== Highest points ===
While Everest is Earth's highest elevation (green) and Mauna Kea is tallest from its base (orange), Cayambe is farthest from Earth's axis (pink) and Chimborazo is farthest from Earth's centre (blue). Not to scale

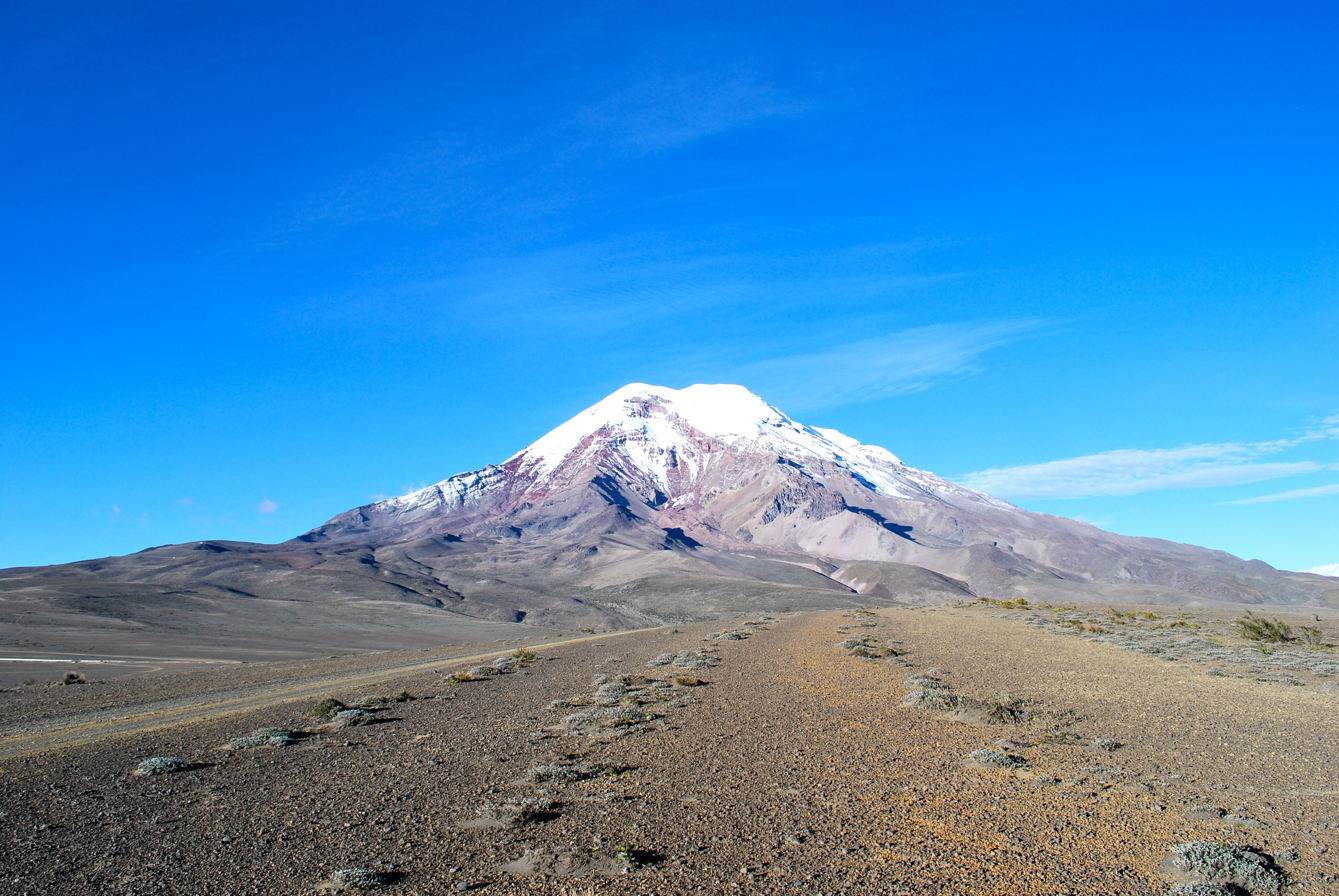
The summit of Chimborazo in Ecuador is the farthest point from Earth's centre.

- The highest point on Earth's surface measured from sea level is the summit of Mount Everest, on the border of Nepal and China. While measurements of its height vary slightly, the elevation of its peak was most recently established in 2020 by the Nepali and Chinese authorities as 8,848.86 m (29,031.7 ft) above sea level. The summit was first reached probably by Sir Edmund Hillary of New Zealand and Tenzing Norgay Sherpa of Nepal in 1953.
- The point farthest from Earth's centre is the summit of Chimborazo in Ecuador, at 6,384.4 km (3,967.1 mi) from Earth's centre; the peak's elevation relative to sea level is 6,263.47 m (20,549 ft). (Note: The elevation given here was established by a GPS survey in February 2016. The survey was carried out by a team from the French Research Institute for Development, working in cooperation with the Ecuadorian Military Geographic Institute.) Because Earth is an oblate spheroid rather than a perfect sphere, it is wider at the equator and narrower toward each pole. Therefore, the summit of Chimborazo, which is near the Equator, is farther away from Earth's centre than the summit of Mount Everest is; the latter is 2,168 m (7,112.9 ft) closer, at 6,382.3 km (3,965.8 mi) from Earth's centre. Peru's Huascarán (at 6,768 m or 22,205 ft) contends closely with Chimborazo, though the former is a mere 10 m (33 ft) closer to the Earth's centre.
- The fastest point on Earth or, in other words, the point farthest from Earth's rotational axis is the summit of Cayambe in Ecuador, which rotates around Earth's axis at a speed of 1,675.89 km/h (1,041.35 mph) and is 6,383.95 km (3,966.80 mi) from the axis. Like Chimborazo, which is the fourth-fastest peak at 1,675.47 km/h (1,041.09 mph), Cayambe is close to the Equator and takes advantage of the oblate spheroid figure of Earth. More important, however, Cayambe's proximity to the Equator means that the majority of its distance from the Earth's centre contributes to Cayambe's distance from the Earth's axis.

==== Highest geographical features ====
- The highest volcano is Ojos del Salado on the Argentina–Chile border. It has the highest summit, 6,893 m (22,615 ft), of any volcano on Earth.
- The highest natural lake is an unnamed crater lake on Ojos del Salado at 6,390 m (20,965 ft), on the Argentina side. Another candidate was Lhagba Pool on the northeast slopes of Mount Everest, Tibet, at an elevation of 6,368 m (20,892 ft), which has since dried up.
- The highest navigable lake is Lake Titicaca, on the border of Bolivia and Peru in the Andes, at 3,812 m (12,507 ft).
- The highest glacier is the Khumbu Glacier on the southwest slopes of Mount Everest in Nepal, beginning on the west side of Lhotse at an elevation of 7,600 to 8,000 m (24,900 to 26,200 ft).
- The highest river is disputed; one candidate from many possibilities is the Ating Ho, which flows into the Aong Tso (Hagung Tso), a large lake in Tibet, and has an elevation of about 6,100 m (20,013 ft) at its source at 32°49′30″N 81°03′45″E. Another very large and high river is the Yarlung Tsangpo or upper Brahmaputra River in Tibet, whose main stem, the Maquan River, has its source at about 6,020 m (19,751 ft) above sea level at 30°48′59″N 82°42′45″E. Above these elevations, there are no constantly flowing rivers since the temperature is almost always below freezing.
- The highest island is one of a number of islands in the Orba Co lake in Tibet, at an elevation of 5,209 m (17,090 ft).

==== Highest points attainable by transportation ====
- The highest point accessible
  - by land vehicle is an elevation of 6,688 m (21,942 ft) on Ojos del Salado in Chile, which was reached by the Chilean duo of Gonzalo and Eduardo Canales Moya on 21 April 2007 with a modified Suzuki Samurai, setting the high-altitude record for a four-wheeled vehicle.
  - by road (dead end) is on a mining road to the summit of Aucanquilcha in Chile, which reaches an elevation of 6,176 m (20,262 ft). It was once usable by 20-tonne mining trucks. The road is no longer usable. 21.214°S 68.475°W
  - by road (mountain pass) is disputed; there are a number of competing claims for this title due to the definition of "motorable pass" (i.e. a surfaced road or one simply passable by a vehicle):
    - The highest asphalted road is the single-lane road to Umling La, located 17 km (11 mi) west of Demchok in Ladakh, India, which reaches 5,800 m (19,029 ft) ("19,300 feet" according to a Border Roads Organisation sign there that recognizes it as the "World's Highest Motorable Pass"). Before the asphalting of the road over Umling La, the highest asphalted road was Tibet's Semo La pass at 5,565 m (18,258 ft). It is used by trucks and buses regularly. The Ticlio pass, on the Central Road of Peru, is the highest surfaced road in the Americas, at an elevation of 4,818 m (15,807 ft).
    - The highest unsurfaced road has several different claimants. All are unsurfaced or gravel roads including Mana Pass, between India and Tibet, which is crossed by a gravel road reaching 5,610 m (18,406 ft). The heavily trafficked Khardung La in Ladakh lies at 5,359 m (17,582 ft). A possibly motorable gravel road crosses Marsimik La in Ladakh at 5,582 m (18,314 ft).
  - by train is Tanggula Pass, located on the Qinghai–Tibet (Qingzang) Railway in the Tanggula Mountains of Qinghai/Tibet, China, at 5,072 m (16,640 ft). The Tanggula railway station is the world's highest railway station at 5,068 m (16,627 ft). Before the Qingzang Railway was built, the highest railway ran between Lima and Huancayo in Peru, reaching 4,829 m (15,843 ft) at Ticlio.
  - by oceangoing vessel is a segment of the Rhine–Main–Danube Canal between the Hilpoltstein and Bachhausen locks in Bavaria, Germany. The locks artificially raise the surface level of the water in the canal to 406 m (1,332 ft) above mean sea level, higher than any other lock system in the world, making it the highest point currently accessible by oceangoing commercial watercraft.

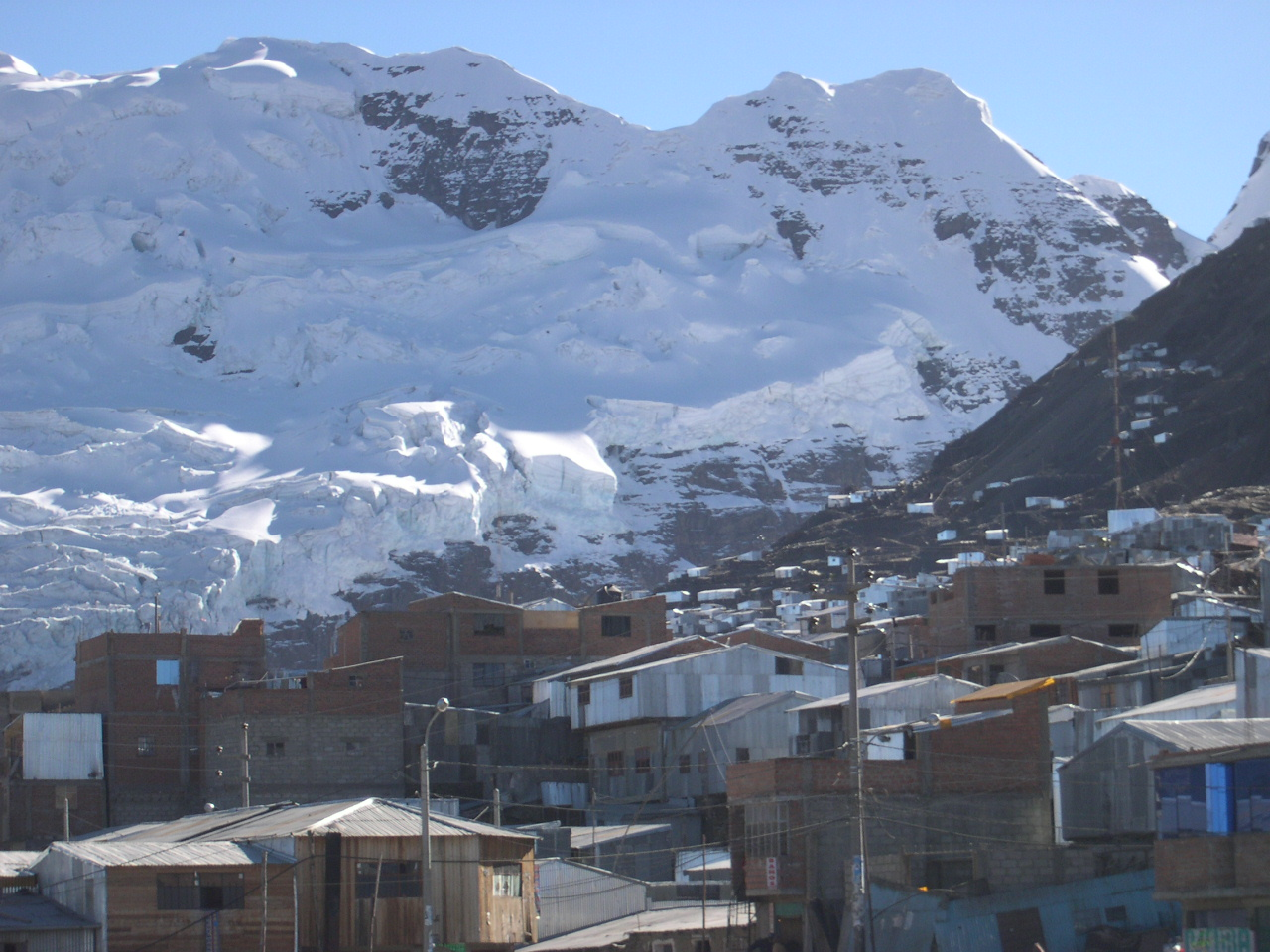
La Rinconada, Peru

- The highest commercial airport is Daocheng Yading Airport, Sichuan, China, at 4,411 m (14,472 ft). The proposed Nagqu Dagring Airport in Tibet, if built, will be 25 m (82 ft) higher at 4,436 m (14,554 ft).
- The highest helipad is Sonam, Siachen Glacier, India, at a height of 6,400 m (20,997 ft) above sea level.
- The highest permanent human settlement is La Rinconada, Peru, 5,100 m (16,732 ft), in the Peruvian Andes.
- The farthest road from the Earth's centre is the Road to Carrel Hut in the Ecuadorian Andes, at an elevation of 4,850 m (15,912 ft) above sea level and a distance of 6,382.9 km (3,966 mi) from the centre of the Earth.

=== Lowest points ===
==== Lowest natural points ====
- The deepest point below the ocean's atmospheric surface is Challenger Deep, at the bottom of the Mariana Trench, 11,034 m (36,201 ft) below sea level. Jacques Piccard and U.S. Navy Lieutenant Don Walsh first reached Challenger Deep in 1960 aboard the bathyscaphe Trieste, followed by filmmaker James Cameron in 2012 aboard Deepsea Challenger. Between 2020 and 2022, DSV Limiting Factor made 19 dives to Challenger Deep, carrying with it 19 further visitors.
- The deepest known cave is in the Krubera Cave in Georgia, with its deepest known point 2,199 ± 20 metres (7,215 ± 66 ft) below its entrance. The record was set in 2006, and it remains one of only two known caves deeper than 2,000 meters.
- The lowest point on land not covered by liquid water is the canyon under Denman Glacier in Antarctica, with the bedrock being 3,500 m (11,500 ft) below sea level.

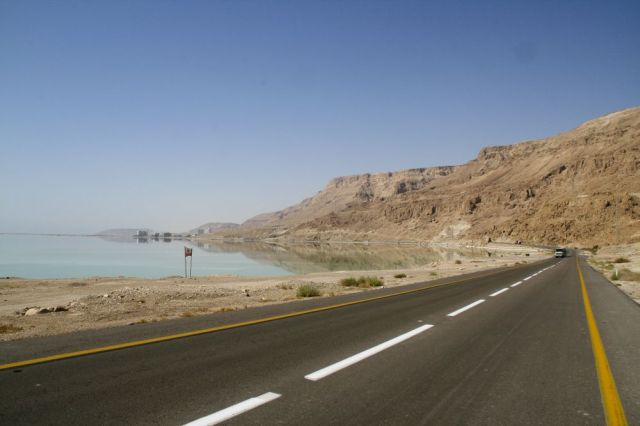
The shore of the Dead Sea in Israel

- The lowest point on dry land is the shore of the Dead Sea, shared by Israel, Palestine and Jordan, 432.65 m (1,419 ft) below sea level. As the Dead Sea waters are receding, the water surface level drops more than 1 metre (3.3 ft) per year.
- The point on the atmospheric surface closest to the Earth's centre (interpreted as a natural surface of the land or sea that is accessible by a person) is the surface of the Arctic Ocean at the Geographic North Pole (6,356.77 km or 3,950 mi).
  - The point on the surface of Earth's crust closest to the Earth's centre (interpreted as a land surface or sea floor) is the bottom of Litke Deep, in the Arctic Ocean, at 6,351.7043 km (3,947 mi) from Earth's centre; the deep's depth relative to sea level is 5,449 m (17,877 ft). Because Earth is an oblate spheroid rather than a perfect sphere, it is wider at the equator and narrower toward each pole. Therefore, the bottom of Litke Deep, which is near the North Pole, is closer to Earth's centre than the bottom of Challenger Deep is; the latter is 14.7268 km (48,316.3 ft) further, at 6,366.4311 km (3,955.9 mi) from Earth's centre. Molloy Deep, also in Arctic Ocean (at 6,357.5178 km or 3,950 mi) from Earth's centre contends closely with Litke Deep, the difference from Earth's centre being just 389 m (1,276 ft).
  - The point on the ocean surface farthest below sea level is located in the Indian Ocean, about 1,200 km (750 mi) southwest of India, the Indian Ocean Geoid Low, about 106 m (348 ft) below the global mean sea level.

==== Lowest artificial points ====
- The lowest point underground ever reached was 12,262 m (40,230 ft) deep (SG-3 at the Kola Superdeep Borehole, which has since been enclosed).
- The lowest human-sized point underground is 3,900 m (12,800 ft) below ground at the TauTona Mine, Carletonville, South Africa.
- The lowest (from sea level) artificially made point with open sky may be the Hambach surface mine, Germany, which reaches a depth of 293 m (961 ft) below sea level.
- The lowest (from surface) artificially made point with open sky may be the Bingham Canyon Open Pit Copper Mine, Utah, United States, at a depth of 1,200 m (3,900 ft) below surface level.
- The lowest point underwater is the 10,685 m (35,056 ft)-deep (as measured from the subsea wellhead) oil and gas well drilled on the Tiber Oil Field in the Gulf of Mexico. The wellhead of this well is an additional 1,259 m (4,131 ft) underwater, for a total distance of 11,944 m (39,186 ft) as measured from sea level. 28.736667°N 88.386944°W

==== Lowest points attainable by transportation ====
- The lowest point accessible:
  - by road, excluding roads in mines, is any of the roads alongside the Dead Sea in Israel, Palestine and Jordan, which are the lowest on Earth at 418 m (1,371 ft) below sea level.
    - The lowest undersea highway tunnel is the Ryfast tunnel in Norway, at 292 m (958 ft) below sea level.
  - by train, excluding tracks in mines, is located in the Seikan Tunnel in Japan, at 240 m (787 ft) below sea level.
  - by ship, is located in the Indian Ocean, about 1,200 km (750 mi) southwest of India, the Indian Ocean Geoid Low, about 106 m (348 ft) below the global mean sea level.
  - Some mines have roads accessible from outside or rail tracks, located more than two thousand metres below sea level, for example in some South African gold mines.
- The lowest railroad station was formerly the Japanese Yoshioka-Kaitei Station, at 150 m (492 ft) below sea level, but it closed in 2014. The lowest railroad station not inside a tunnel is 120 m (394 ft) below sea level, at Beit She'an railway station in Israel.
- The lowest airfield is the Bar Yehuda Airfield, near Masada, Israel, at 378 m (1,240 ft) below sea level.
- The lowest international airport is Atyrau Airport, near Atyrau, Kazakhstan, at 22 m (72 ft) below sea level, in the basin of the Caspian Sea.
- The lowest major city is Baku, Azerbaijan, located 28 m (92 ft) below sea level, which makes it the lowest-lying national capital in the world and also the largest city in the world located below sea level.

=== Table of extreme elevations and air temperatures by continent ===
Continent	Elevation (height above/below sea level)^{A}		Air temperature (recorded)^{B}	
Continent	Highest	Lowest	Highest	Lowest
Africa	5,893 m (19,334 feet); Kilimanjaro, Tanzania	−155 m (−509 feet); Lake Assal, Djibouti	55 °C (131 °F) (disputed); Kebili, French Tunisia; 7 July 1931^{C}	−23.9 °C (−11.0 °F); Ifrane, French Morocco; 11 February 1935
Antarctica	4,892 m (16,050 feet); Vinson Massif	−50 m (−164 feet); Deep Lake, Vestfold Hills (compare the deepest ice section below)	20.75 °C (69.35 °F); Comandante Ferraz Antarctic Station; 9 February 2020	−89.2 °C (−128.6 °F); Vostok Station; 21 July 1983
Asia	8,848.86 m (29,032 feet); Mount Everest, Tibet–Nepal Border	−424 m (−1,391 feet); Dead Sea, Israel–Jordan–Palestine	54 °C (129 °F); Tirat Zvi, Israel (then in the British Mandate of Palestine); 21 June 1942	−67.7 °C (−89.9 °F) Measured; Oymyakon, Siberia, Soviet Union; 6 February 1933
Asia	8,848.86 m (29,032 feet); Mount Everest, Tibet–Nepal Border	−424 m (−1,391 feet); Dead Sea, Israel–Jordan–Palestine	54 °C (129 °F); Ahvaz Airport, Iran; 29 June 2017	−71.2 °C (−96.2 °F) Extrapolated; Oymyakon, Siberia, Soviet Union; 26 January 1926
Europe	5,642 m (18,510 feet); Mount Elbrus, Russian Federation	−28 m (−92 feet); Caspian Sea shore, Russian Federation	48.8 °C (119.8 °F); Floridia, Italy; 11 August 2021	−58.1 °C (−72.6 °F); Ust-Shchuger, Soviet Union; 31 December 1978
North America	6,190.5 m (20,310 feet); Denali (federally designated as Mount McKinley), Alaska, United States	−85 m (−279 feet); Badwater Basin, California, United States	56.7 °C (134.1 °F); Furnace Creek (then named Greenland Ranch), Death Valley, California, United States; 10 July 1913^{C} (disputed while still official, but up to 54.4 °C (129.9 °F) has also been recorded there in 2020 and 2021, not yet verified by WMO; and 54.0 °C (129.2 °F) which is verified.)	−69.6 °C (−93.3 °F); Summit Camp, Greenland; 22 December 1991
Oceania	4,884 m (16,024 feet); Puncak Jaya (Carstensz Pyramid), Indonesia (compare Mount Wilhelm, Aoraki / Mount Cook and Mount Kosciuszko)	−15 m (−49 feet); Lake Eyre, South Australia, Australia	50.7 °C (123.3 °F); Oodnadatta, South Australia, Australia; 2 January 1960^{G} 50.7 °C (123.3 °F); Onslow, Western Australia, Australia; 13 January 2022	−25.6 °C (−14.1 °F); Ranfurly, Otago, New Zealand; 17 July 1903
South America	6,962 m (22,841 feet); Aconcagua, Mendoza, Argentina	−105 m (−344 feet); Laguna del Carbón, Argentina	48.9 °C (120.0 °F); Rivadavia, Salta Province, Argentina; 11 December 1905	−32.8 °C (−27.0 °F); Sarmiento, Chubut Province, Argentina; 1 June 1907
A. Height above sea level is the usual choice of definition for elevation. The point farthest away from the centre of the Earth, however, is Chimborazo in Ecuador (6,267 m (20,561 feet)). This is due to the Earth's oblate spheroid shape, with points near the Equator being farther out from the centre than those at the poles. B. All temperatures from the World Meteorological Organization unless noted. C. The former record of 57.7 °C (135.9 °F) recorded at Al 'Aziziyah, Libya on 13 September 1922 was ruled no longer valid by the WMO due to mistakes made in the recording process. The 1913 reading is, however, itself controversial, and a measurement of 54.0 °C (129.2 °F) at Furnace Creek on 30 June 2013 is undisputed, especially since the same or almost the same temperature has been recorded several times in the 21st century in the same and other places. E. Temperatures greater than 50 °C (122 °F) in Spain and Portugal were recorded in 1881, but the standard with which they were measured and the accuracy of the thermometers used are unknown; therefore, they are not considered official. F. Greenland is considered by the World Meteorological Organization to be part of WMO region 6 (Europe). G. A temperature of 53.1 °C (127.6 °F) was recorded in Cloncurry, Queensland on 16 January 1889 under non-standard exposure conditions and is therefore not considered official.

== Humans and biogeography ==
On land, vegetation appears on a scale from brown (low vegetation) to dark green (heavy vegetation); at the ocean surface, phytoplankton are indicated on a scale from purple (low) to yellow (high).

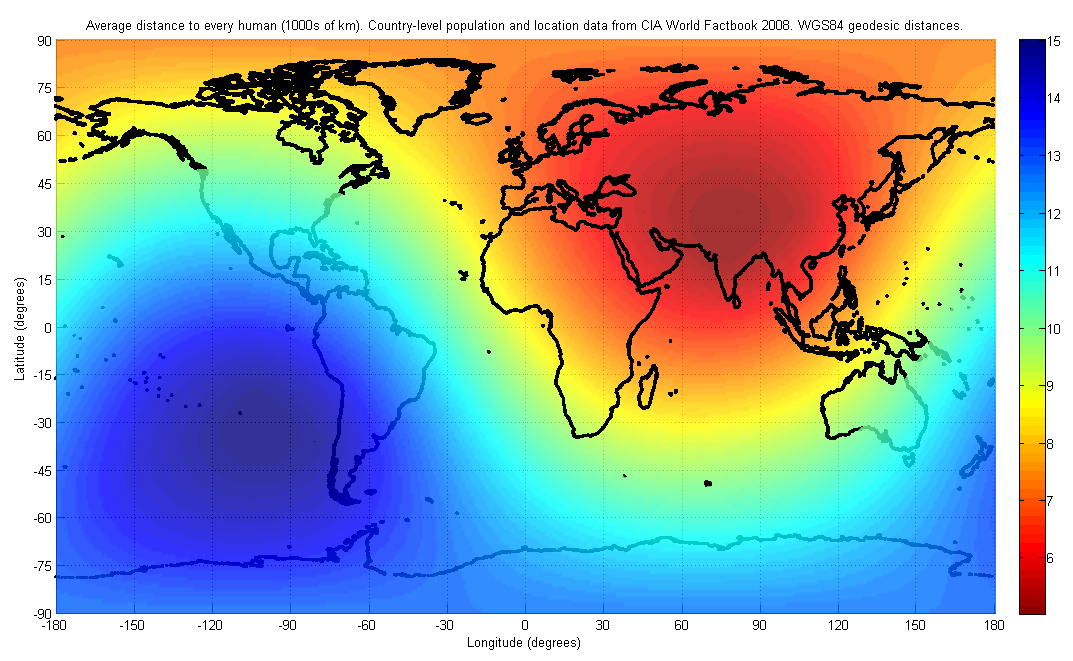
For representational purposes only: The point on earth closest to everyone in the world on average was calculated to be in Central Asia, with a mean distance of 5,000 kilometers (3,000 mi). Its antipodal point is correspondingly the farthest point from everyone on earth, and is located in the South Pacific near Easter Island, with a mean distance of 15,000 kilometers (9,300 mi). The data used by this figure is lumped at the country level, and is therefore precise only to country-scale distances, larger nations heavily skewed. Far more granular data -- kilometer level, is now available -- compares with this old "textbook" example.

In contrast to places with the highest density of life, like terrestrial tropical regions, and beside local extreme conditions, which might only be overcome by extremophiles, there are areas of extreme low amounts of life.

Next to terrestrial lifeless areas like the Antarctic desert's McMurdo Dry Valleys and its Don Juan Pond, the most lifeless area in the ocean studied (other than the more general dead zones) is the South Pacific Gyre, corresponding to the oceanic pole of inaccessibility.

The oceanic pole of inaccessibility is also the antipodal area of the human center of population which lies today around southern Central Asia. Similarly the world's economic center of gravity has been drifting since antiquity from Central Asia to Northern Europe and contemporarily back to Central Asia. The related centre of gravity of the worlds carbon emission has shifted from Britain during the Industrial Revolution to the Atlantic, back again and contemporarily into Central Asia.

== Remoteness ==
=== Poles of inaccessibility ===
Each continent has its own continental pole of inaccessibility, defined as the place on the continent that is farthest from any ocean. Similarly, each ocean has its own oceanic pole of inaccessibility, defined as the place in the ocean that is farthest from any land.

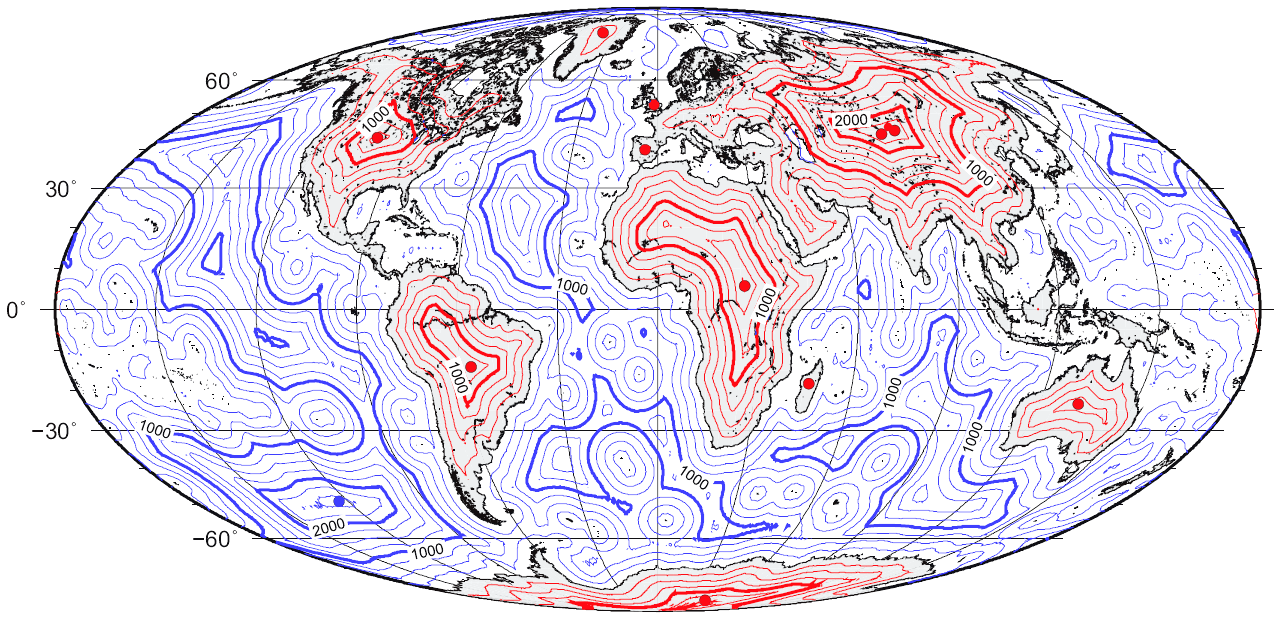
Map of distance to the nearest coastline (including oceanic islands, but not lakes) with red spots marking the poles of inaccessibility of main landmasses, Great Britain, and the Iberian Peninsula, and a blue dot marking the oceanic pole of inaccessibility. Thin isolines are 250 km (160 mi) apart; thick lines 1,000 km (620 mi). Mollweide projection.

==== Continental ====
- The most distant point from an ocean is the Eurasian Pole of Inaccessibility (or "EPIA") 46°17′N 86°40′E, in China's Xinjiang region near the border with Kazakhstan. Calculations have shown that this point, located in the Dzoosotoyn Elisen Desert, is 2,645 km (1,644 mi) from the nearest coastline. The nearest settlement to the EPIA is Suluk at 46°15′N 86°50′E, about 11 km (7 mi) to the east. A 2007 study suggests that the historical calculation of the EPIA failed to recognize the point where the Gulf of Ob joins the Arctic Ocean, and proposes instead that varying definitions of coastline could result in other locations for the EPIA:
  - EPIA1, somewhere between 44°17′N 82°11′E and 44°29′N 82°19′E, is about 2,510 ± 10 km (1,559.6 ± 6.2 mi) from the nearest ocean.
  - EPIA2, somewhere between 45°17′N 88°08′E and 45°28′N 88°14′E, is about 2,514 ± 7 km (1,562.1 ± 4.3 mi) from the nearest ocean.

If adopted, this would place the final EPIA roughly 130 km (80 mi) closer to the ocean than the point that is currently agreed upon. Coincidentally, EPIA1, or EPIA2, and the most remote of the Oceanic Pole of Inaccessibility (specifically, the point in the South Pacific Ocean that is farthest from land) are similarly remote; EPIA1 is less than 200 km (120 mi) closer to the ocean than the Oceanic Pole of Inaccessibility is to land.

- The continental poles of inaccessibility for the other continents are as follows:
  - Africa: 5.65°N 26.17°E, close to the tripoint of the Central African Republic, South Sudan, and the Democratic Republic of the Congo
  - Australia: either 23°2′S 132°10′E, or 23.17°S 132.27°E, near Papunya, Northern Territory
  - North America: 43.36°N 101.97°W, between Kyle, South Dakota and Allen, South Dakota, United States.
  - South America: 14.05°S 56.85°W, near Arenápolis, Mato Grosso, Brazil

==== Oceanic ====
- The most distant point from land is the Pacific pole of inaccessibility (also called "Point Nemo", in a region known as the spacecraft cemetery), which lies in the South Pacific Ocean at 48°52.6′S 123°23.6′W, about 2,688 km (1,670 mi) from the nearest land (equidistant from Ducie Island in the Pitcairn Islands to the north, Motu Nui off Rapa Nui to the northeast, and Maher Island off Siple Island near Marie Byrd Land, Antarctica, to the south). The centre of the Pacific Ocean and the Water Hemisphere lie west to it, closer to Oceania, off the coast of Kiribati at 47°24′42″N 2°37′15″W and New Zealand at 47°24′42″S 177°22′45″E respectively.

=== Other places considered the most remote ===
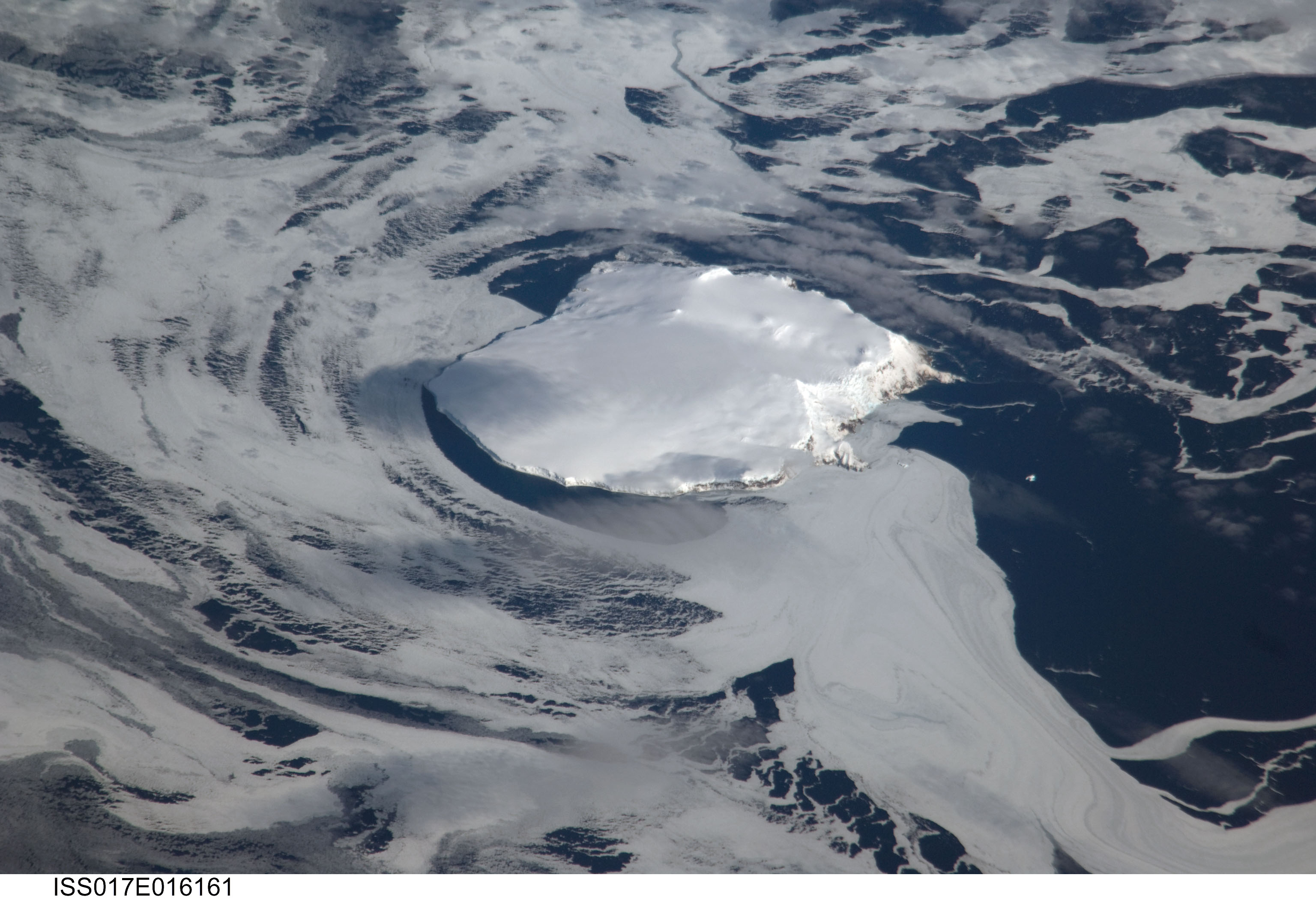
Bouvet Island

- The most remote island is Bouvet Island, a small, uninhabited island in the South Atlantic Ocean that is a dependency of Norway. It lies at coordinates 54°26′S 3°24′E. The nearest land is the uninhabited Queen Maud Land, Antarctica (also claimed by Norway), over 1,600 km (1,000 mi) to the south. The nearest inhabited lands are Gough Island, 1,845 km (1,146 mi) away, Tristan da Cunha, 2,260 km (1,404 mi) away, and the coast of South Africa, 2,580 km (1,603 mi) away.
- The title for most remote inhabited island or archipelago (the farthest away from any other permanently inhabited place) depends on how the question is interpreted. If the south Atlantic island Tristan da Cunha (population about 300) and its dependency Gough Island (with a small staffed research post), which are 399 km (248 mi) from each other, are considered part of the same archipelago, or if Gough Island is not counted because it has no permanent residents, then Tristan da Cunha is the world's most remote inhabited island/archipelago: the main island, also called Tristan da Cunha, is 2,434 km (1,512 mi) from the island Saint Helena, 2,816 km (1,750 mi) from South Africa, and 3,360 km (2,090 mi) from South America. It is 2,260 km (1,404 mi) away from uninhabited Bouvet Island. However, if Gough and Tristan da Cunha are considered separately, they disqualify each other, and the most remote inhabited island is Easter Island in the South Pacific Ocean, which lies 2,075 km (1,289 mi) from Pitcairn Island (about 50 residents in 2013), 2,606 km (1,619 mi) from Rikitea on the island of Mangareva (the nearest town with a population over 500), and 3,512 km (2,182 mi) from the coast of Chile (the nearest continental point and the country of which Easter Island is part). The Kerguelen Islands in the southern Indian Ocean are another contender, lying 1,340 km (830 mi) from the small Alfred Faure scientific station in Île de la Possession, but otherwise more than 3,300 km (2,100 mi) from the coast of Madagascar (the nearest permanently inhabited place), 450 km (280 mi) northwest of the uninhabited Heard Island and McDonald Islands (both a part of Australia), and 1,440 km (890 mi) from the non-permanent scientific station located in Île Amsterdam.
- Remote cities
  - The most remote city with a population in excess of one million from the nearest city with a population in excess of one million is Auckland, New Zealand. The nearest city of comparable size or greater is Sydney, Australia, 2,168.9 km (1,347.7 mi) away.
  - The most remote city with a population in excess of one million from the nearest city with a population above 100,000 is Perth, Australia, located 2,138 km (1,328 mi) away from Adelaide, Australia.
  - The most remote city with a population in excess of 100,000 from the nearest city with a population in excess of 100,000 is Honolulu, Hawaii, United States. The nearest city of comparable size or greater is San Francisco, 3,850 km (2,390 mi) away.
  - The most remote national capitals are Wellington, New Zealand, and Canberra, Australia, which are 2,326 km (1,445 mi) apart from each other and neither is closer to another capital.
- The most remote airport in the world from another airport is Mataveri International Airport (IPC) on Easter Island, which has a single runway for military and public use. It is located 2,603 km (1,617 mi) from Totegegie Airport (GMR; very few flights) in the Gambier Islands, French Polynesia and 3,759 km (2,336 mi) from Santiago, Chile (SCL; a fairly large airport). In comparison, the airport at the Amundsen–Scott South Pole Station (NZSP) is far less remote, being located only 1,355 km (842 mi) from Williams Field (NZWD) near Ross Island.

== Centre ==
Since the Earth is a spheroid, its centre (the core) is thousands of kilometres beneath its crust. Still, there have been attempts to define various "centrepoints" on the Earth's surface.

- The centre of the standard geographic model as viewed on a traditional world map is the point 0°, 0° (the coordinates of zero degrees latitude by zero degrees longitude), which is located in the Atlantic Ocean about 614 km (382 mi) south of Accra, Ghana, in the Gulf of Guinea. It lies at the intersection of the Equator and the Prime Meridian, is marked with a buoy, and is sometimes called Null Island. However, the selection of the Prime Meridian as the 0° longitude meridian depended on cultural and historical factors and is therefore geographically arbitrary (any of the Earth's meridians could, in principle, be defined as 0° longitude); consequently, the position of the "Null Island" centrepoint is also arbitrary.
- The centre of population, the place to which there is the shortest average route for every individual human being in the world, could also be considered a "centre of the world". This point is located in the north of the Indian subcontinent, although the precise location has never been calculated and is constantly shifting due to changes in the distribution of the human population across the planet.

== Geophysical extremes ==
=== Tallest mountain ===
- Mount Everest, the highest point above Earth's sea level, measuring 8,848.86 m (29,031.7 ft).
- Mauna Kea, tallest mountain from base-to-peak, with a dry prominence of 9,330 m (30,610 ft) and a wet prominence above sea level of 4,207.3 m (13,803 ft).
- Denali, tallest mountain from base-to-peak on land, measuring 5,500 m (18,000 ft).

=== Greatest vertical drop ===
Greatest purely vertical drop	1,200 m (4,100 ft); Mount Thor, Auyuittuq National Park, Baffin Island, Nunavut, Canada (summit elevation 1,675 m (5,495 ft))
Greatest nearly vertical drop	1,340 m (4,396 ft); Trango Towers, Gilgit-Baltistan, Pakistan (summit elevation 6,286 m (20,623 ft))
Greatest mountain face	4,600 m (15,092 ft); Nanga Parbat, Rupal Face, Azad Kashmir, Pakistan
Greatest ocean cliff	Kermadec Trench, with cliffs around 8,000 m (26,000 ft) tall

=== Longest ===
- Great Escarpment, South Africa is the longest surface escarpment at 5,000 km long

=== Subterranean ===
Deepest mine below ground level	4,000 m (13,000 ft); Mponeng Gold Mine, Gauteng Province, South Africa
Deepest mine below sea level	2,733 m (8,967 ft) below sea level Kidd Mine, Ontario, Canada
Deepest open-pit mine below ground level	1,200 m (3,900 ft); Bingham Canyon Mine, Utah, United States
Deepest open-pit mine below sea level	293 m (961 ft) below sea level Tagebau Hambach, Germany
Longest surveyed cave system	675.9 km (420.0 mi); Mammoth Cave, Kentucky, US
Longest surveyed underwater cave, and second overall	524.1 km (325.7 mi); Sistema Ox Bel Ha in Yucatán, Mexico at
Deepest known cave, measured from its highest entrance to its lowest point	2,204 m (7,231 ft); Veryovkina Cave in the Abkhazia region of Georgia This was the first cave to be explored to a depth of more than 2,000 m (6,600 ft). (The first cave to be descended below 1,000 m (3,300 ft) was Gouffre Berger in France.) The Sarma and Illyuzia-Mezhonnogo-Snezhnaya caves in Georgia, (1,830 m or 6,000 ft, and 1,753 m or 5,751 ft respectively) are the current second- and third-deepest caves. The deepest outside Georgia is Lamprechtsofen Vogelschacht Weg Schacht in Austria, which is 1,623 m (5,325 ft) deep.
Deepest vertical shaft in a cave	603 m (1,978 ft); Vrtoglavica Cave in Slovenia. The second deepest is Ghar-e-Ghala at 562 m (1,844 ft) in the Parau massif near Kermanshah in Iran.
Deepest pitch (single vertical drop)	1,026 m (3,366 ft); Tian Xing Cave, China
Deepest reached by a remotely operated underwater vehicle in an underwater cave	450 metres (1,480 ft); Hranice Abyss in the Czech Republic.
Largest known room by volume	10,780,000 m^{3} (381,000,000 cu ft); Miao Room
Largest known room by surface	154,500 m^{2} (1,663,000 sq ft); Sarawak Chamber, in the Gunung Mulu National Park (Miri, Sarawak, Borneo, Malaysia)
Largest room in a show cave	3,600,000 m^{2} (39,000,000 sq ft); Salle de la Verna in the French Pyrenees.
Largest passage	4.6 km (2.9 mi) in length, 80 m (260 ft) high and wide over most of its length, but over 140 m (460 ft) high and wide for part of its length Son Doong Cave in Phong Nha-Kẻ Bàng National Park in Quảng Bình Province, Vietnam
Highest surveyed cave	4,930 m (16,170 ft); Qaqa Mach'ay in the Peruvian Andes at an elevation of 4930m above sea level. Subsequent GPS measurements suggest this is understated.

=== Five longest surveyed caves ===
1. Mammoth Cave, Kentucky, US
2. Sistema Ox Bel Ha, Mexico
3. Sistema Sac Actun/Sistema Dos Ojos, Mexico
4. Jewel Cave, South Dakota, US
5. Shuanghedong Cave Network, China

=== Greatest oceanic depths ===
Atlantic Ocean	8,376 m (27,480 ft); Milwaukee Deep (within the Brownson Deep), Puerto Rico Trench
Arctic Ocean	5,550 m (18,209 ft); Molloy Deep, Fram Strait
Indian Ocean	7,192 m (23,596 ft); Sunda Trench
Mediterranean Sea	5,267 m (17,280 ft); Calypso Deep, Hellenic Trench
Pacific Ocean	10,928 m (35,853 ft); Challenger Deep, Mariana Trench
Southern Ocean	7,433.6 m (24,388 ft); South Sandwich Trench (southernmost portion, at 60°28.46′S 025°32.32′W)

=== Deepest ice ===
Ice sheets on land, but having the base below sea level. Places under ice are not considered to be on land.

Denman Subglacial Trench	−3,500 m (−11,500 ft)	Antarctica
Trough beneath Jakobshavn Isbræ	−1,512 m (−4,961 ft)	Greenland, Denmark

== Meteorological extremes ==
=== Coldest and hottest inhabited places on Earth ===
Hottest inhabited place	Dallol, Ethiopia (Amharic: ዳሎል), whose annual mean temperature was recorded from 1960 to 1966 as 34.4 °C (93.9 °F). The average daily maximum temperature during the same period was 41.1 °C (106.0 °F).
Coldest inhabited place	Oymyakon (Russian: Оймяко́н; Yakut: Өймөкөөн), a rural locality (selo) in Oymyakonsky District of the Sakha Republic, the Russian Federation, has the coldest monthly mean, with −45.7 °C (−50.3 °F) the average temperature in January, the coldest month. Eureka, Nunavut, Canada has the lowest annual mean temperature at −19.7 °C (−3.5 °F).
Coldest inhabited place	The South Pole and some other places in Antarctica are colder and are populated year-round, but almost everyone stays less than a year and could be considered visitors, not inhabitants.

=== Ground temperatures ===
Temperatures measured directly on the ground may exceed air temperatures by 30 to 50 °C. A ground temperature of 84 °C (183.2 °F) has been recorded in Port Sudan, Sudan. A ground temperature of 93.9 °C (201 °F) was recorded in Furnace Creek, Death Valley, California, United States on 15 July 1972; this may be the highest natural ground surface temperature ever recorded. The theoretical maximum possible ground surface temperature has been estimated to be between 90 and 100 °C for dry, darkish soils of low thermal conductivity.

Satellite measurements of ground temperature taken between 2003 and 2009, taken with the MODIS infrared spectroradiometer on the Aqua satellite, found a maximum temperature of 70.7 °C (159.3 °F), which was recorded in 2005 in the Lut Desert, Iran. The Lut Desert was also found to have the highest maximum temperature in 5 of the 7 years measured (2004, 2005, 2006, 2007 and 2009). These measurements reflect averages over a large region and so are lower than the maximum point surface temperature.

Satellite measurements of the surface temperature of Antarctica, taken between 1982 and 2013, found a coldest temperature of −93.2 °C (−136 °F) on 10 August 2010, at 81.8°S 59.3°E. Although this is not comparable to an air temperature, it is believed that the air temperature at this location would have been lower than the official record lowest air temperature of −89.2 °C.

== Extreme points by region ==
=== Afro-Eurasia ===
- Extreme points of Afro-Eurasia
  - Africa
    - Algeria
    - Angola
    - Benin
    - Botswana
    - Burkina Faso
    - Burundi
    - Cameroon
    - Cape Verde
    - Central African Republic
    - Chad
    - Comoros
    - Democratic Republic of the Congo
    - Republic of Congo
    - Côte d'Ivoire
    - Djibouti
    - Egypt
    - Equatorial Guinea
    - Eritrea
    - Ethiopia
    - Gabon
    - Gambia
    - Ghana
    - Guinea
    - Guinea-Bissau
    - Kenya
    - Lesotho
    - Liberia
    - Libya
    - Madagascar
    - Malawi
    - Mali
    - Mauritania
    - Mauritius
    - Morocco
    - Mozambique
    - Namibia
    - Niger
    - Nigeria
    - Rwanda
    - São Tomé and Príncipe
    - Senegal
    - Seychelles
    - Sierra Leone
    - Somalia
    - South Africa
    - Sudan
    - South Sudan
    - Swaziland
    - Tanzania
    - Togo
    - Tunisia
    - Uganda
    - Western Sahara
    - Zambia
    - Zimbabwe
  - Eurasia
    - Asia
      - Afghanistan
      - Armenia
      - Azerbaijan
      - Bangladesh
      - Bhutan
      - Cambodia
      - China
      - Georgia
      - India
      - Indonesia
      - Iran
      - Israel
      - Japan
      - Jordan
      - Kazakhstan
      - Kyrgyzstan
      - Laos
      - Malaysia
      - Maldives
      - Mongolia
      - Myanmar
      - Nepal
      - North Korea
      - Pakistan
      - Philippines
      - Russia
      - Singapore
      - South Korea
      - Sri Lanka
      - Taiwan
      - Tajikistan
      - Thailand
      - Turkmenistan
      - Uzbekistan
      - Vietnam
    - Europe
      - European Union
      - Albania
      - Andorra
      - Austria
      - Belarus
      - Belgium
      - Bosnia and Herzegovina
      - Bulgaria
      - Croatia
      - Czech Republic
      - Denmark
      - Estonia
      - Finland
      - France
      - Germany
      - Greece
      - Hungary
      - Iceland
      - Ireland
      - Italy
      - Kosovo
      - Latvia
      - Liechtenstein
      - Lithuania
      - Luxembourg
      - Malta
      - Moldova
      - Monaco
      - Montenegro
      - Netherlands
      - North Macedonia
      - Norway
      - Poland
      - Portugal
      - Romania
      - Russia
      - San Marino
      - Serbia
      - Slovakia
      - Slovenia
      - Spain
      - Sweden
      - Switzerland
      - Turkey
      - Ukraine
      - United Kingdom
      - Vatican City

=== The Americas ===
- Extreme points of the Americas
  - North America
    - Canada (provinces, communities)
    - Greenland
    - Mexico
    - United States (states, New England)
    - Central America
      - Belize
      - Costa Rica
      - El Salvador
      - Guatemala
      - Honduras
      - Nicaragua
      - Panama
    - The Caribbean
      - Cuba
      - Dominican Republic
      - Jamaica
  - South America
    - Argentina
    - Bolivia
    - Brazil
    - Chile
    - Colombia
    - Ecuador
    - French Guiana
    - Guyana
    - Paraguay
    - Peru
    - Suriname
    - Uruguay
    - Venezuela

=== Oceania ===
- Extreme points of Oceania
  - Australia
  - Fiji
  - Guam
  - Indonesia
  - Kiribati
  - Marshall Islands
  - Micronesia
  - Nauru
  - New Zealand
  - Niue
  - the Northern Mariana Islands
  - Palau
  - Papua New Guinea
  - Tuvalu

=== Antarctica ===
- Extreme points of Antarctica

=== Arctic ===
- Extreme points of the Arctic

== See also ==
- Geographical centre
- Lists of extreme points

Latitude and longitude

- List of northernmost items (city, capital, island, etc.)
- List of southernmost items (city, capital, island, etc.)
- Northernmost settlements
- Southernmost settlements

Elevation

- List of elevation extremes by country
- List of elevation extremes by region
- List of highest towns by country

Geophysical features

- List of deepest caves
- List of deepest oceanic trenches
- List of deserts by area
- List of highest mountains on Earth
  - List of volcanoes by elevation
- List of impact craters on Earth
- List of islands by area
- List of lakes by area
- List of lakes by depth
- List of rivers by length
- List of waterfalls by height

Meteorology and climate

- List of weather records

Beyond Earth

- List of Solar System extremes
- List of extrasolar planet extremes
