= Extreme points of Turkmenistan =

This is a list of the extreme points of Turkmenistan: the points that are farther north, south, east or west than any other location, as well as the highest and lowest points in the country.

== Latitude and longitude ==
Heading	Location	Coordinates	Ref
North	Üstýurt, north-west of Köneürgenç		
South	Çilduhtar, south of Serhetabat		
West	Suwe Cape, Balkan Region		
East	Hezretaksar Peak		

== Altitude ==
Extremity	Name	Elevation	Location	Coordinates	Ref
Highest	Aýrybaba	3,139 m (10,298.6 ft)	Lebap Province		
Lowest	Akjagaýa Depression	−81 m (−265.7 ft)	Daşoguz Province		

== See also ==
- Extreme points of Asia
- Extreme points of Earth
- Geography of Turkmenistan
