= Extreme points of Bhutan =

Extreme points of Bhutan

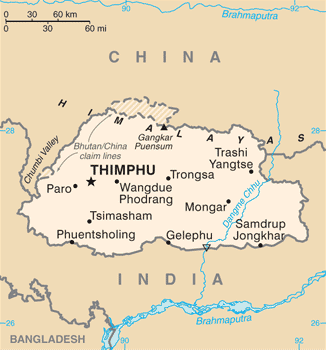
Map of Bhutan

This is a list of the extreme points of Bhutan.

== Country extreme points ==
=== Latitude and longitude ===
- North:
  - disputed: Gasa District-China border. 28°21′N 90°13′E (Note: Bhutan's border with China(PRC) has been disputed.)
  - undisputed: Gasa District-China border, near Jigme Dorji National Park. 28°14′N 89°47′E
- South: Sarpang District-India (Assam) border. 26°42′N 89°46′E
- West: Samtse District-India (Sikkim) border, near Neora Valley National Park. 27°8′N 88°44′E
- East: Trashigang District-India (Arunachal Pradesh) border, near Sakteng Wildlife Sanctuary. 27°17′N 92°7′E

=== Altitude ===
- The highest point measured from sea level is the summit of Gangkhar Puensum at 7,570 m (24,836 ft). Gangkhar Puensum is located in northwestern Bhutan along the borders of Gasa District, Wangdue Phodrang District, and China. 28°03′N 90°27′E
- The lowest point is located in the Drangme Chhu, a river system in central and eastern Bhutan, at 97 m (318 ft) above sea level. The lowest point is located in eastern Sarpang District where the Mangde Chhu river crosses into India (Assam) near the Indian town of Manas.

=== Highest attainable by transportation ===
- Road (mountain pass): The Lateral Road, the main east–west highway, traverses Trumshing La in central Bhutan at an altitude of over 3,800 m (12,467 ft).
- Airport: Yongphulla Airport, a domestic airfield under renovation, near the town of Trashigang in Trashigang District, at 2,743 m (8,999 ft). 27°15′23″N 091°30′52″E

=== Highest geographical features ===
- Lake:
- River:

== See also ==
- Extreme points of Earth
  - Extreme points of Afro-Eurasia
    - Extreme points of Eurasia
      - Extreme points of Asia
- Geography of Bhutan
