= Extreme points of Serbia and Montenegro =

Extreme points of Serbia and Montenegro may refer to:

- Extreme points of Montenegro
- Extreme points of Serbia
