= List of extreme points of Ukraine =

The extreme points of Ukraine include the coordinates that are further north, south, east or west than any other location in Ukraine as well as the highest and the lowest altitudes in the country. Due to the ongoing Russian occupation of the Crimean peninsula and other parts of Ukraine in the south and eastern parts of the country during the Russo-Ukrainian War, the easternmost and southernmost points in the country have been de facto controlled by Russia although still de jure recognized internationally as part of Ukraine. With the exception of the southernmost point located in the Crimean resort town of Foros, the remaining extreme points of the country are located near, but not within, populated areas.

The latitude and longitude are expressed in decimal degree notation, in which a positive latitude value refers to the northern hemisphere, and a negative value refers to the southern hemisphere. Similarly, a positive longitude value refers to the eastern hemisphere, and a negative value refers to the western hemisphere. The coordinates used in this article are sourced from Google Earth, which makes use of the WGS84 geodetic reference system. Additionally, a negative altitude value refers to land below sea level.

== De jure extreme points ==
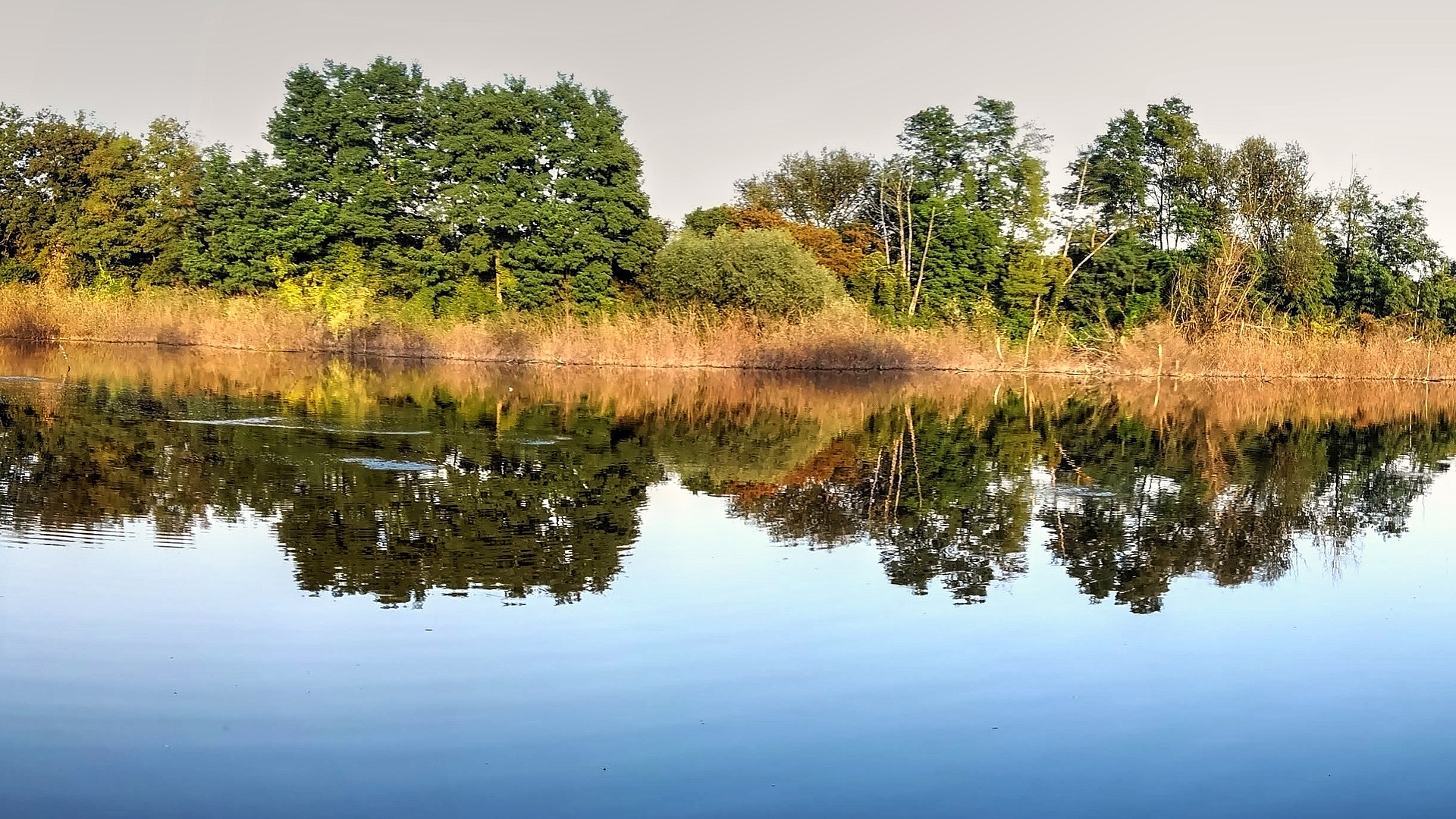
The westernmost point, oxbow lake Mertva Tisa near Solomonovo

The northernmost point of Ukraine is located in Chernihiv Oblast, near the village of Hremiach, which was briefly occupied in 2022 by Russian forces during its full-scale invasion of Ukraine. The northernmost point that is considered to have not been occupied since Ukraine's independence in 1991 is located in Volyn Oblast.

The country's southernmost area is Crimea and easternmost region is Luhansk Oblast; however, due to the Donbas war and ongoing full-scale Russian invasion of Ukraine, all of Crimea as well as most of Luhansk Oblast are occupied by and disputed with Russia. Consequently, this list mentions both the controlled and uncontrolled southernmost and easternmost points in the country.

Extreme points in Ukraine
Heading	Location	Administrative entity	Bordering entity	Coordinates
North	Near the village of Hremiach (Ukrainian: Грем'яч)	Chernihiv Oblast	Bryansk Oblast, Russia	52°22'46"N, 33°11'28"E
South	In the resort town Foros (Ukrainian: Форос)	Autonomous Republic of Crimea	Black Sea	44°23'11N, 33°46'38"E
East	Near the village Rannya Zorya (Ukrainian: Рання Зоря)	Luhansk Oblast	Rostov Oblast, Russia	49°15'38"N, 40°13'40"E
West	Near the city Chop (Ukrainian: Чоп)	Zakarpattia Oblast	Slovakia/Hungary	48°25'06"N, 22°08'13"E

== Altitudes ==
Extreme altitudes in Ukraine
Extremity	Name	Altitude	Location	State	Coordinates
Highest	Hoverla (Ukrainian: Говерла)	2,061 m (6,762 ft)	In the Carpathian Mountains	Ivano-Frankivsk/Zakarpattia Oblast	48°09′37″N, 24°30′00″E
Lowest	Kuyalnik Estuary (Ukrainian: Куяльницький лиман)	−5 m (−16.4 ft)	Near the city of Odesa	Odesa Oblast	46°39′52″N, 30°42′47″E

== See also ==
Ukraine related

- Borders of Ukraine
- Geography of Ukraine
- Extreme points of Europe
- Administrative divisions of Ukraine
- Russian-occupied territories of Ukraine
- Outline of Ukraine

Other related topics

- Extreme points of Belarus
- Extreme points of Hungary
- Extreme points of Moldova
- Extreme points of Poland
- Extreme points of Romania
- Extreme points of Russia
- Extreme points of Slovakia
