= Northernmost =

Northernmost may refer to:

- List of northernmost items
- List of northernmost settlements
- Northernmost point of land

== See also ==
- Lists of extreme points
