= Extreme points of Malta =

This is a list of extreme points of Malta. The points that are farthest north, south, east or west than any other location. Malta is composed of an archipelago of seven islands.

== Extreme points of the Republic of Malta ==
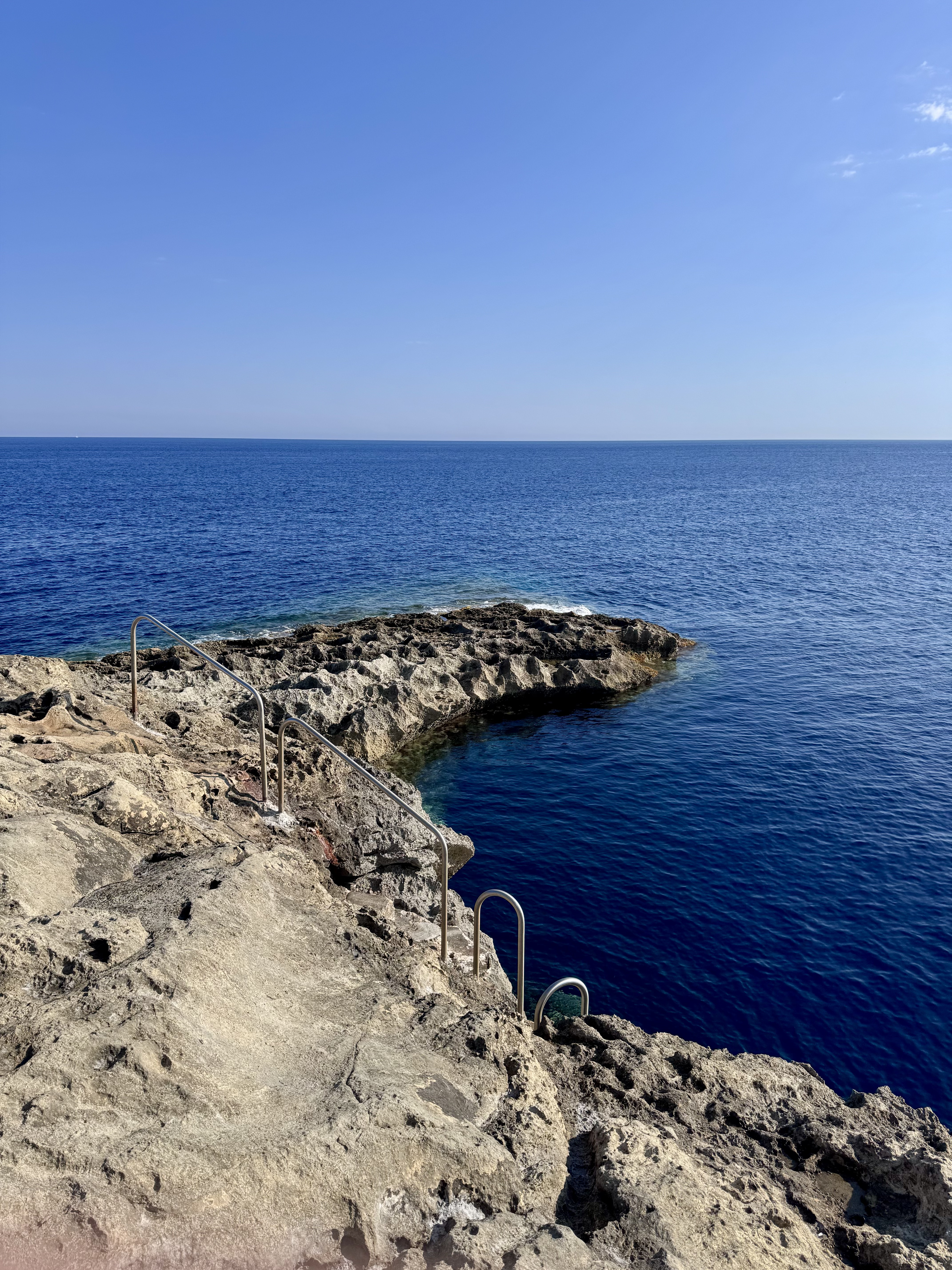
The promontory of Reqqa Point, Gozo. A permanent ladder is an entry-point for several scuba diving attractions in the vicinity.

- Northernmost point – Reqqa Point, Gozo 36°4′55″N 14°14′9″E
- Northernmost settlement – Żebbuġ, Gozo 36°4′15″N 14°14′13″E
- Southernmost point – Filfla 35°47′N 14°24′E
- Southernmost settlement – Birżebbuġa, Malta 35°49′32″N 14°31′41″E
- Westernmost point – San Dimitri Point, Gozo
- Westernmost settlement – Saint Lawrence, Gozo 36°3′18″N 14°12′15″E
- Easternmost point – Marsaskala, Malta 35°51′40″N 14°34′35″E
- Easternmost settlement – Marsaskala, Malta 35°51′45″N 14°34′3″E

== Elevation ==
- Highest point – Ta' Dmejrek, Malta, at 253 m.
- Lowest point – Mediterranean Sea, at 0 m.

== See also ==
- Geography of Malta
- Extreme points of the European Union
- Extreme points of Eurasia
- Extreme points of Africa-Eurasia
- Extreme points of Earth
