= World record =

Best recorded performance of a specific skill or activity

A world record is usually the best global and most important performance that is ever recorded and officially verified in a specific skill, sport, or other kind of activity. The book Guinness World Records and other world records organizations collates and publishes notable records of many.

== Terminology ==
In the United States, the form World's Record was formerly more common. The term The World's Best was also briefly in use. The latter term is still used in athletics events, including track and field and road running to describe good and bad performances that are not recognized as an official world record: either because it is not an event where World Athletics tracks the record (e.g. the 150 m run or individual events in a decathlon), or because it does not fulfill other rigorous criteria of an otherwise qualifying event (e.g. the Great North Run half-marathon, which has an excessive downhill gradient). The term is also used in video game speedrunning for the fastest achieved time in the game and category.

== Sports ==
Some sports have world records recognised by their respective sports governing bodies:

- List of One Day International cricket records
- List of world records in athletics
- List of junior world records in athletics
- List of world records in masters athletics
- List of world youth bests in athletics
- List of IPC world records in athletics
- List of world records in canoeing
- List of world records in chess
- List of cycling records
- List of world records in track cycling
- List of world records in finswimming
- List of world records in juggling
- List of world records in rowing
- List of world records in speed skating
- List of world records in swimming
- List of IPC world records in swimming
- List of world records in Olympic weightlifting

== See also ==
- Lists of extreme points
