= List of extreme points of Iran =

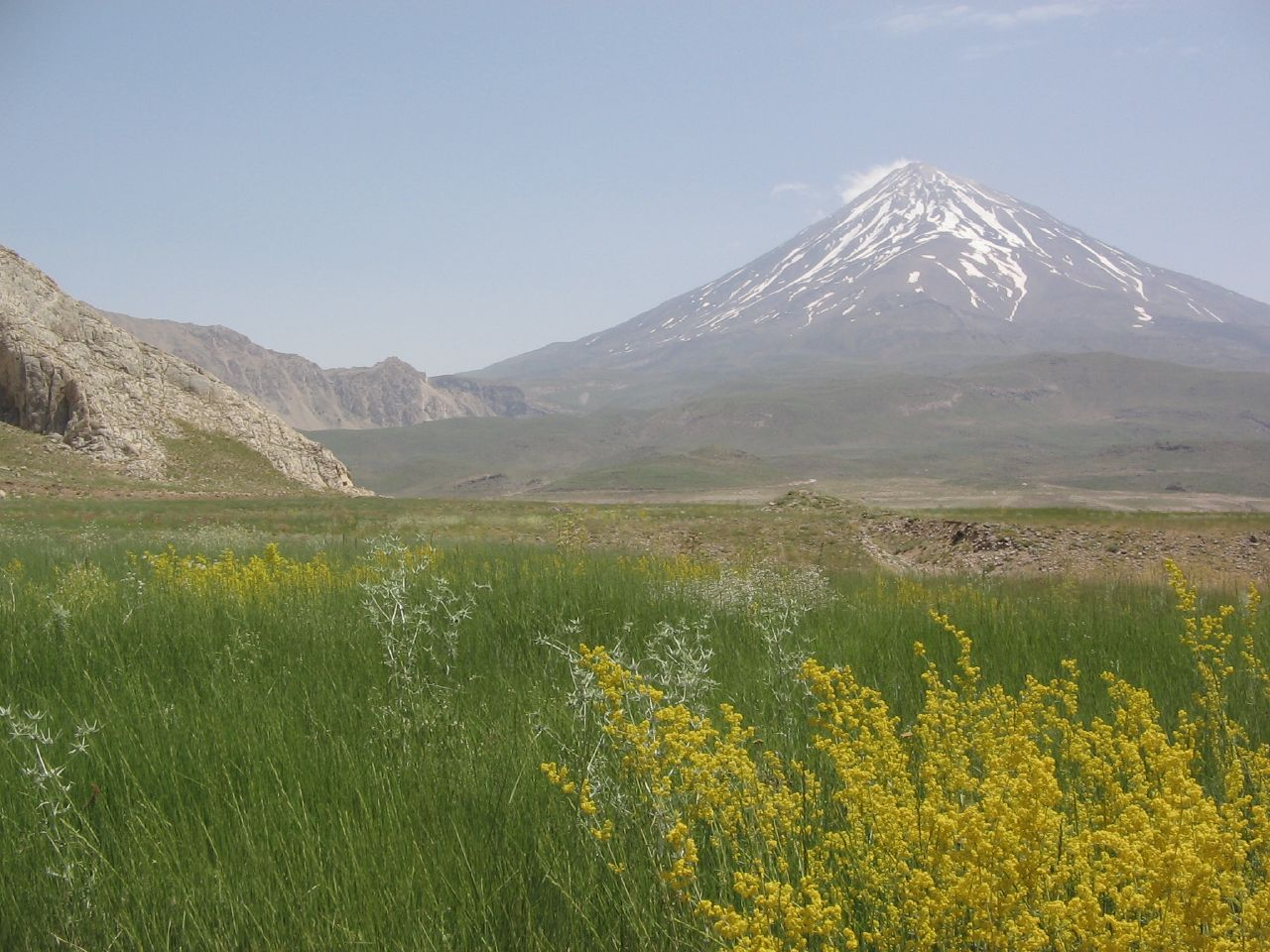
Mt Damavand, the tallest Mountain in Iran

Extreme points of Iran

This is a list of the extreme points of Iran.

== Towns, cities, and Islands ==
- Northernmost — Qush, West Azerbaijan at 39°44′55″N 44°37′26″E (Cheshmeh Soraya is the northernmost area)
- Southernmost — Pasabandar (Town), Sistan and Baluchestan at 25°4′1″N 61°24′44″E and Abu Musa (Island), Hormozgan at 25°52′N 55°2′E (also claimed by the UAE).
- Westernmost — Soleyman Aghol, West Azarbaijan at 39°22′55″N 44°3′2″E
- Easternmost — Kuhak, Sistan and Baluchestan Province at 27°8′3″N 63°14′55″E
- Geographical centre — Markar Clock Tower, Yazd 31°53′1.82″N 54°22′5.92″E

== Elevation extremes ==
- Lowest point: Caspian Sea level: −28 metres (−92 ft)
- Highest point: Mount Damavand: 5,609 metres (18,403 ft)

== See also ==
- Extreme points of Earth
- Geography of Iran
