= Extreme points of Asia =

This is a list of the extreme points of Asia, the points that are farther north, south, east or west than any other location on the continent.

Asia

- Northernmost Point — Cape Fligely, Prince Rudolf Island, Franz Josef Land, Russia (81°52'N)
  - Franz Josef Land is near the ill-defined border between Europe and Asia
  - if it is not considered a part of Asia, then the northernmost point is Arctic Cape, Komsomolets Island (81°17'N)
- Southernmost Point — Pamana Island, Indonesia (11°00'S)
  - When Cocos (Keeling) Islands included as part of Southeast Asia, then South Island (12°04'S)
- Westernmost Point — Cape Baba, Turkey (26°4'E)²
  - if the offshore Greek islands (North Aegean Islands and Dodecanese Islands), then the westernmost point is Skokia Island, Greece, a small island off the coast of Antipsara Island (25°29'E)
- Easternmost Point — Big Diomede, Russia (169°03'W)³

Asia (mainland)

- Northernmost Point — Cape Chelyuskin, Russia (77°43'N)
- Southernmost Point — Tanjung Piai, Malaysia (1°16'N)
- Westernmost Point
  - By longitude — 180th meridian, Russia (180°E)
  - On a continuous westbound path — Cape Baba, Turkey (26°4'E)
- Easternmost Point
  - By longitude — 180th meridian, Russia (180°E)
  - On a continuous eastbound path — Cape Dezhnev, Russia (169°40'W)³

== See also ==
- Geography of Asia
- Extreme points of the world
- Extreme points of Eurasia
- Extreme points of Afghanistan
- Extreme points of Bangladesh
- Extreme points of China
- Extreme points of Hong Kong
- Extreme points of India
- Extreme points of Indonesia
- Extreme points of Japan
- Extreme points of Jordan
- Extreme points of South Korea
- Extreme points of Mongolia
- Extreme points of Pakistan
- Extreme points of the Philippines
- Extreme points of Russia
- Extreme points of Singapore
- Extreme points of Taiwan
- Extreme points of Turkey

== Notes ==
² The Turkish islands in the Aegean and Mediterranean Seas are considered part of Europe.

³ The 180th meridian passes through Asia, meaning that these points are in the Western Hemisphere.
