= Pamana Island =

Southernmost island in Indonesia

Dana Island
Indonesian: Pulau Dana
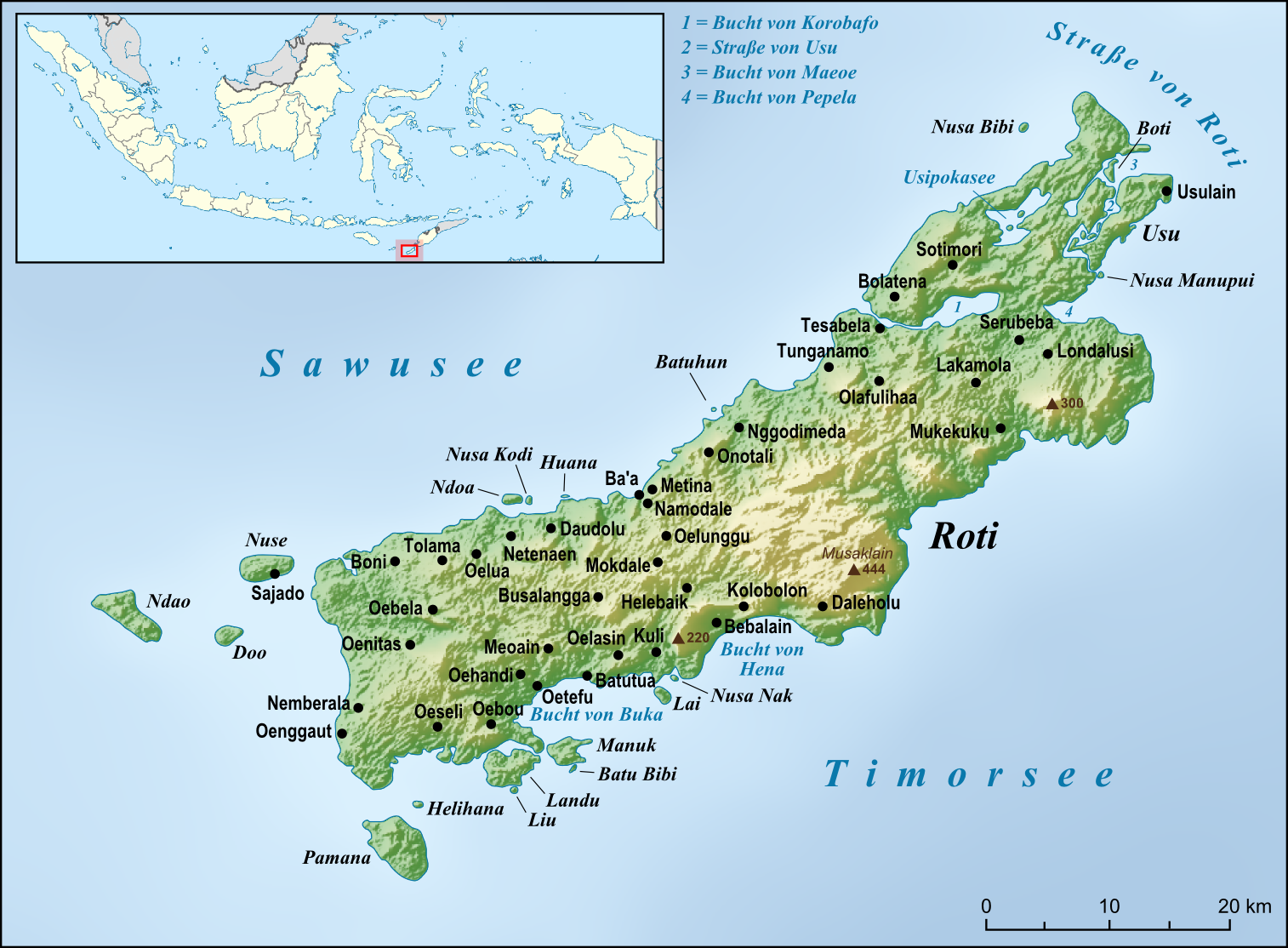
- Interactive map of Dana Island

Geography
- Coordinates: 11°00′14″S 122°52′21″E
- Archipelago: Rote Islands
- Area: 14 km^{2} (5.4 sq mi)
- Highest elevation: 197 m (646 ft)
- Highest point: Mount David

Administration
- Indonesia

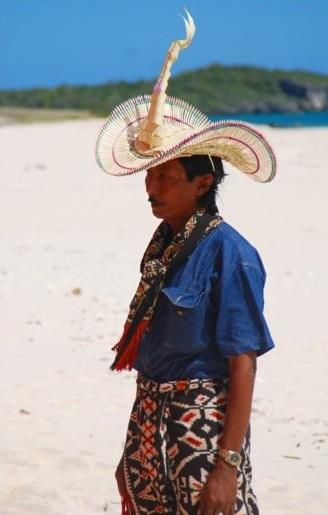
The Maharaja (King) of West Rote visiting Pamana Island

Pamana Island (Dana, Dona, Ndana) is a small island off Rote Island in Indonesia's East Nusa Tenggara province of Lesser Sunda Islands, and the southernmost point of Asia. It lies exactly on latitude 11°S. Administratively this island is part of Rote Ndao Regency. It borders the Ashmore and Cartier Islands to the south.

The island is inhabited by some deer, various bird species and is visited annually by turtles who come to lay their eggs.

== Literature ==
- Monk, K.A.; Fretes, Y.; Reksodiharjo-Lilley, G. (1996). The Ecology of Nusa Tenggara and Maluku. Hong Kong: Periplus Editions Ltd. p. 7. ISBN 962-593-076-0.

== See also ==
- Extreme points of Indonesia
- Extreme points of Asia
- List of islands of Indonesia
- Lesser Sunda Islands
