= Extreme points of Uruguay =

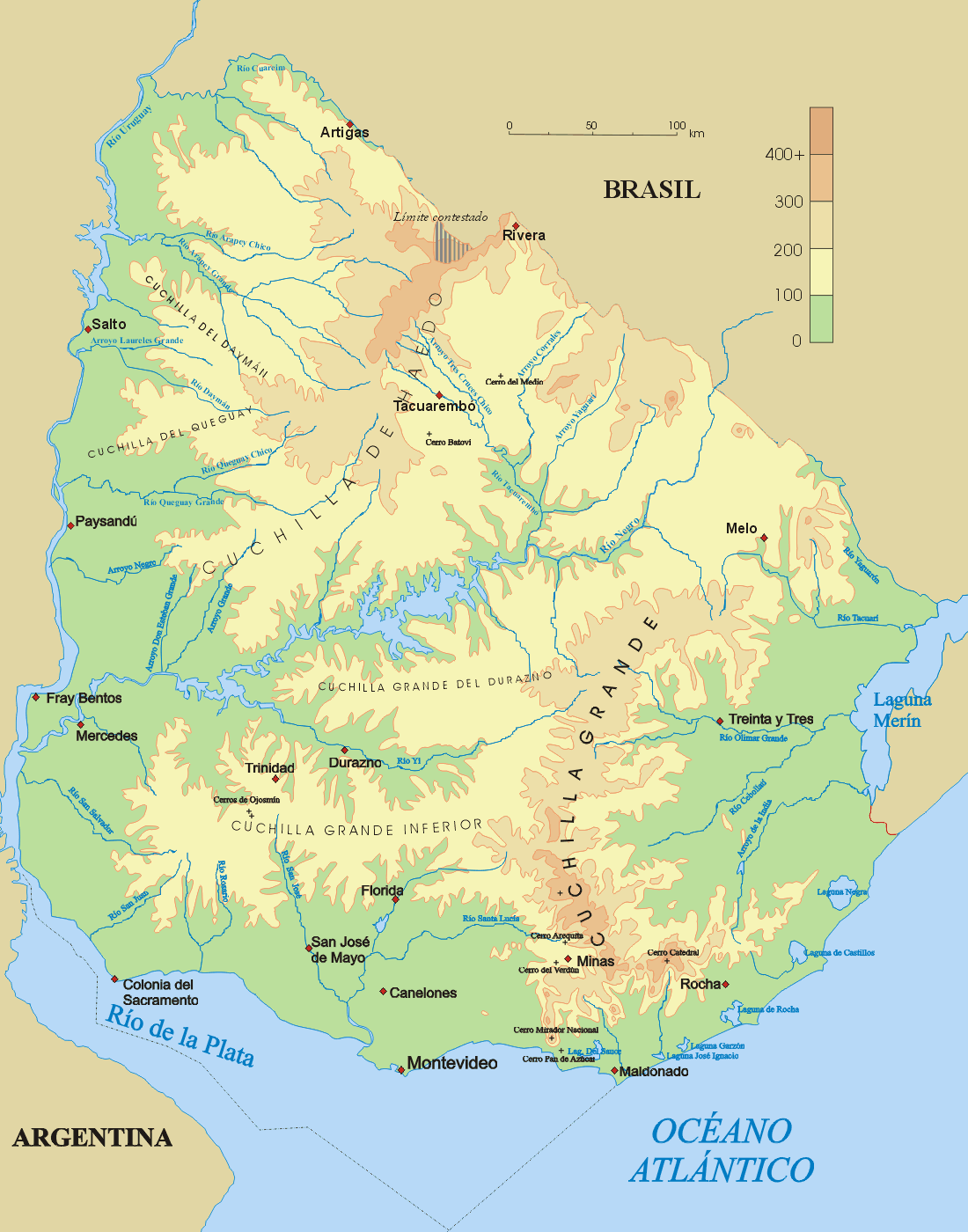
Physical map of Uruguay.

This is a list of the extreme points of Uruguay, the points that are farther north, south, east or west than any other location, and the highest and lowest points. It is also notable that Uruguay's northernmost point is farther south than the northernmost point of any other nation.

== Latitude and longitude ==
- Northernmost point: Northernmost point of Artigas Department: 30°05′08″S 56°57′06″W
- Southernmost point: Isla de Lobos: 35.031°S 54.884°W
- Southernmost point (mainland): Punta del Este, Maldonado Department: 34.973°S 54.951°W
- Westernmost point: Punta Arenal Grande, San Salvador River, Soriano Department: 33°41′00″S 58°26′21″W
- Easternmost point: mouths of the Yaguarón River at the Laguna Merín, Cerro Largo Department: 32°39′14″S 53°10′58″W

== Altitude ==
- Highest point: Cerro Catedral, Sierra Carapé, Maldonado Department, 1,685 feet (514 m)
- Lowest point: the coast at sea level.
