= Extreme points of Oceania =

This is a list of the extreme points of Oceania.

- Northernmost point – Kure Atoll, United States (28° 25′ 0″ N)
- Southernmost point – Auckland Islands, New Zealand (50° 42′ 0″ S)
- Easternmost point – Isla Salas y Gómez, Chile (105° 21′ 45″ W)
- Westernmost point – Dirk Hartog Island, Australia (113° 5′ 0″ E)
- Lowest point on land – Lake Eyre, Australia: −15 m (−49 ft)
- Highest point – Puncak Jaya, Indonesia: 4,884 metres (16,024 ft)
- Deepest sea – Challenger Deep: 10,994 metres (36,070 ft)

== See also ==
- Extreme points of Earth
- List of extreme points of Australia
- List of extreme points of New Zealand
