= List of extreme points of Jordan =

A list of extreme points and elevation in Jordan.

== Elevation ==
- Lowest point: Dead Sea: -408 m. (Also, lowest point on Earth.)
- Highest point: Jabal Umm ad Dami: 1,854 metres (6,083 ft).

== Extreme points ==
- Northernmost point: tripoint with Syria and Iraq, Mafraq Governorate: 33°22′N 38°47′E
- Southernmost point: intersection of Amman-Tabuk railway with Jordan/Saudi Arabian border, Ma'an Governorate: 29°11′N 36°04′E
- Easternmost point: border with Iraq and Saudi Arabia, Mafraq Governorate: 32°14′N 39°17′E
- Westernmost point: border with Saudi Arabia close to the Durra crossing on the Gulf of Aqaba, Aqaba Governorate: 29°21′N 34°57′E

== See also ==
- Extreme points of Earth
