= Extreme points of San Marino =

Map showing San Marino's extreme points

This is a list of the extreme points of San Marino: the points that are farther north, south, east or west than any other location.

== Latitude and longitude ==
- North: Rovereta, north of Falciano at 43°59′N 12°30′E
- South: Selva, south of Fiorentino at 43°53′45″N 12°27′20″E (Coincidentally, Longitude 12˚, 27' E is shared with another micro-state, the Vatican City.)
- West: Gualdicciolo, near Acquaviva at 43°56′55″N 12°24′30″E
- East: The intersection of the roads Strada del Marano and Strada del Fossa, in the castella of Faetano at 43°56′30″N 12°31′00″E

== Altitude ==
- Highest point: Monte Titano, 739 m at 43°56′06″N 12°27′00″E
- Lowest point: Torrente Ausa, 55 m

== See also ==
- Extreme points of Europe
- Extreme points of Earth
- Geography of San Marino
