= Extreme points of Luxembourg =

This is a list of the extreme points of Luxembourg, the points that are farther north, south, east or west, higher or lower than any other location in the territory of the state.

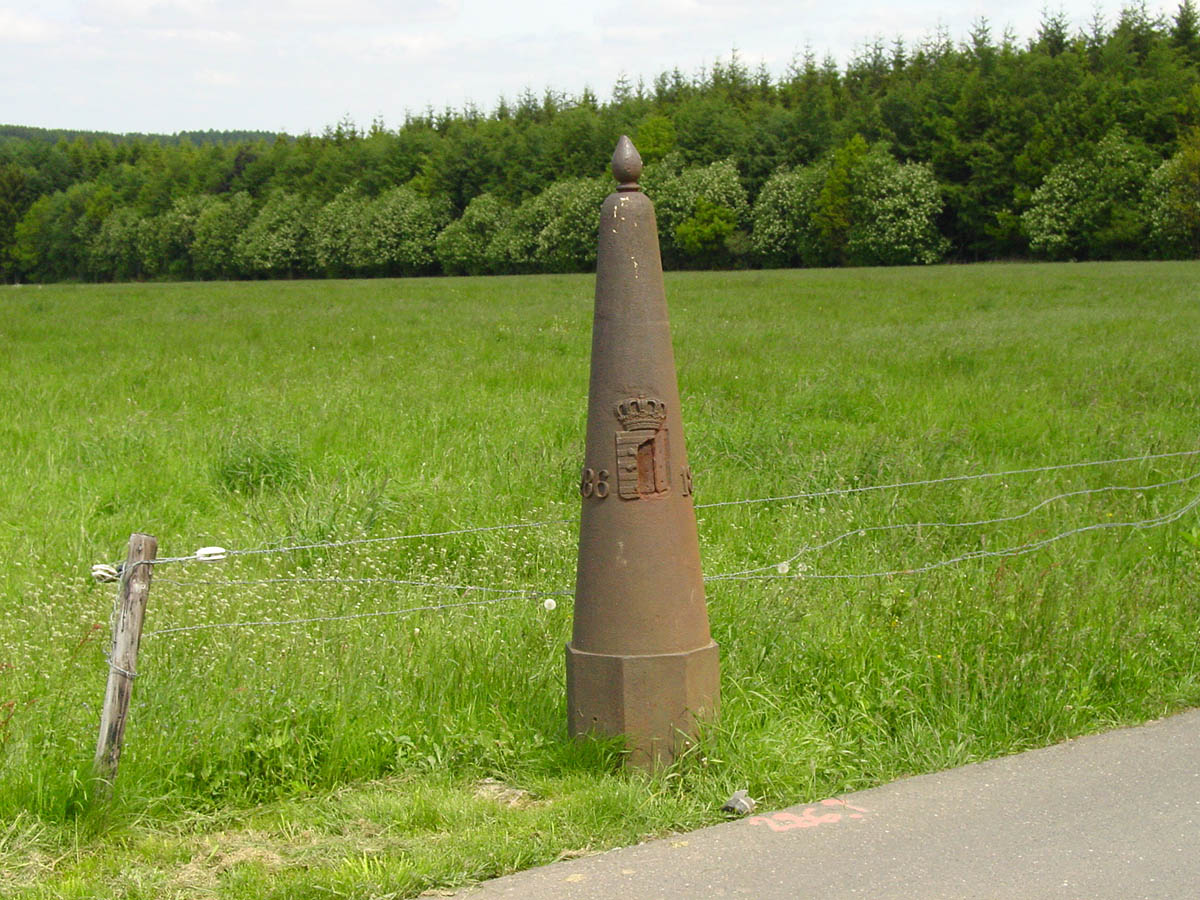
The northernmost point of Luxembourg

== Latitude and longitude ==
- Northernmost point – in Troisvierges, Clervaux Canton (50°10′58″N 6°01′29″E)
- Southernmost point – near Rumelange, Esch-sur-Alzette Canton (49°26′52″N 6°02′30″E)
- Easternmost point – on Sauer River in Rosport-Mompach, Echternach Canton (49°48′21″N 6°31′51″E)
- Westernmost point – near Surré, Wiltz Canton (49°53′49″N 5°44′09″E)
- Geographical center – near Bissen (49°46′38″N 6°05′43″E)

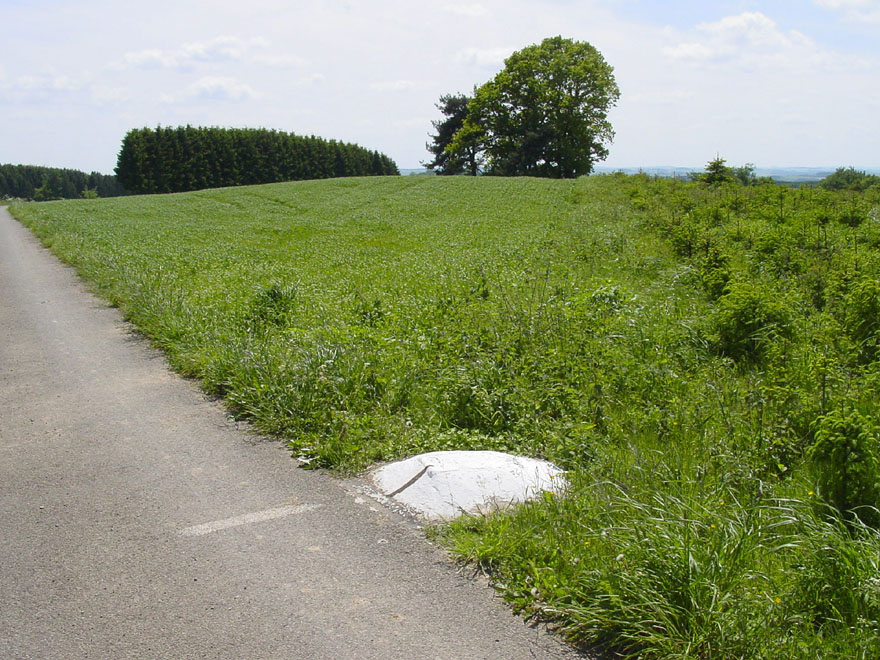
Kneiff, the highest point in the country

== Elevation ==
- Highest point – Kneiff at 560 m, in Troisvierges (50°09′28″N 6°02′14″E)
- Lowest point – confluence of Sauer and Moselle Rivers at 129.9 m, in Wasserbillig (49°42′47″N 6°30′24″E)

The CIA World Factbook (2024) gives Buurgplaatz, at 559 m, as the highest point; this was the previously established highest point before new results in 1997. It gives the Moselle River, at 133 m, as the lowest point.

== See also ==
- Extreme points of Earth
- Geography of Luxembourg
