= List of extreme points of Lithuania =

This is a list of the extreme points of Lithuania: the points that are farther north, south, east or west than any other location, as well as the highest and lowest points.

== Latitude and longitude ==
- Northern point: near former Lemkinė village on the shores of Nemunėlis in the Biržai district municipality 56°27′1″N 24°53′05″E
- Southern point: in the Varėna district municipality, in uninhabitable forest area, cadastrally belonging to village Musteika. 53°53′48″N 24°21′07″E The southernmost habitable place is in the village Ašašninkai, so called fraction Plaskiniškės.53°55′51″N 24°17′14″E
- Eastern point: near Vosiūnai village in the Ignalina district municipality 55°17′08″N 26°50′08″E
- Western point: Nida 55°16′51″N 20°57′18″E

== Altitude ==
- Lowest point: Rusnė Island (-.27 m)
- Highest point: Aukštojas Hill (294 m)

== See also ==
- Extreme points of Europe
- Extreme points of Earth
