= Akjagaýa =

Coordinates: 41.05°N 58.25°E

Akjagaýa is a depression in the northwest Karakum Desert in Turkmenistan. It is to the south of the Sarykamyska Valley.
