= Extreme points of Slovenia =

Extreme geographical points of Slovenia:

== Longitude and latitude ==
- North: 46°53′N 16°14′E, Budinci, Municipality of Šalovci,
- South: 45°25′N 15°10′E, Damelj, Municipality of Črnomelj,
- East: 46°28′N 16°36′E, Benica Municipality of Lendava,
- West: 46°17′N 13°23′E, Breginj, Municipality of Kobarid.

The maximum north–south distance is 1°28' or 163 km (101 mi).
The maximum east–west distance is 3°13' or 248 km (154 mi).

== Elevation ==
- Highest point: Triglav at 2864 m (46°22′27″N 13°49′46.68″E)
- Lowest point: Adriatic Sea at 0 m (45°33′08″N 13°43′26″E)
