= Extreme points of Slovakia =

This is a list of the extreme points of Slovakia: the points that are farther north, south, east or west than any other location, as well as the highest and lowest points.

== Latitude and longitude ==
- North: near Oravská Polhora
- South: Patince
- West: near Záhorská Ves
- East: Nová Sedlica
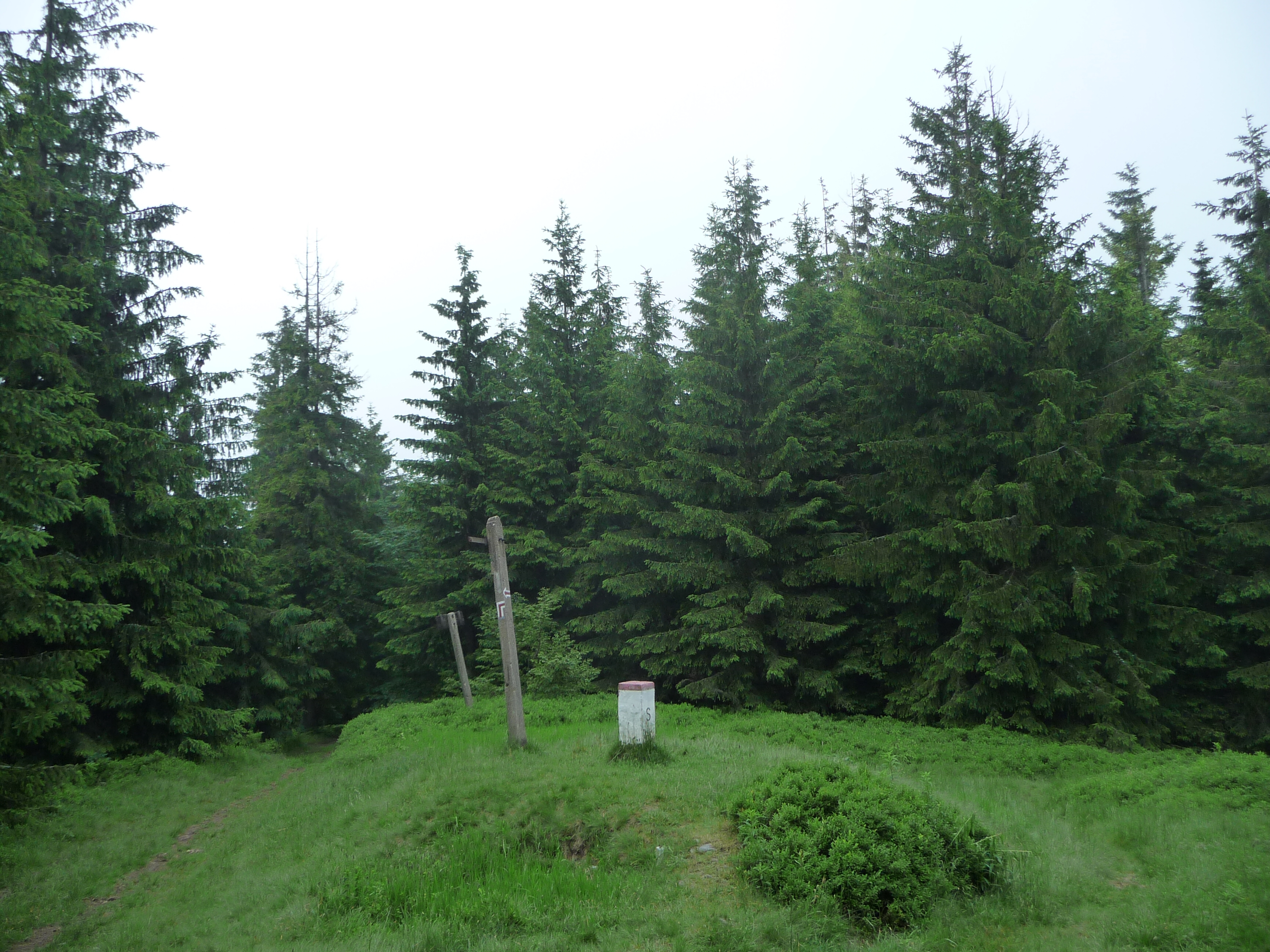
Northernmost point of Slovakia

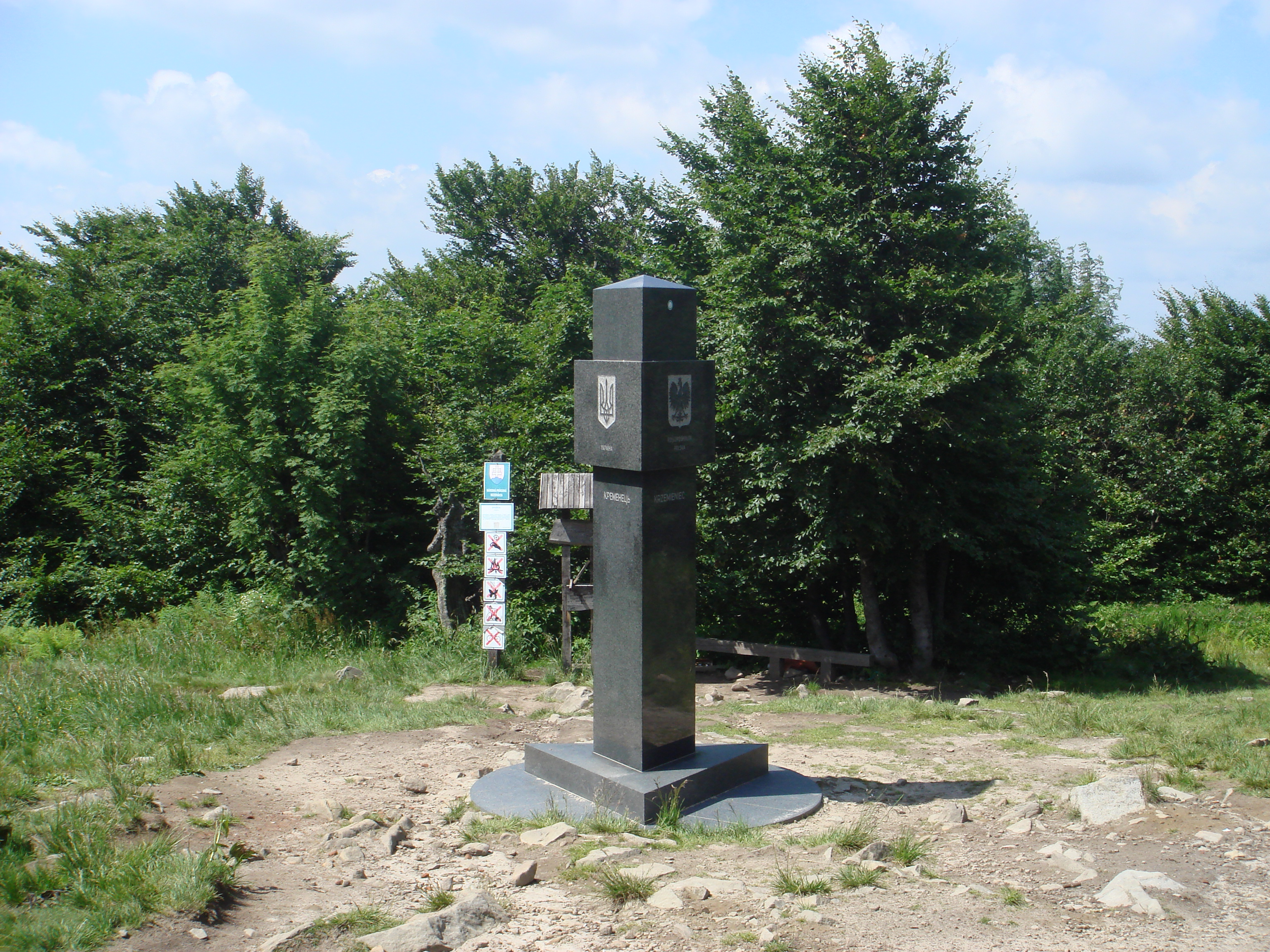
Easternmost point of Slovakia

The distance between Záhorská Ves (the westernmost point) and Nová Sedlica (the easternmost point) is 428 km.

== Altitude ==
- Maximum: Gerlachovský štít, High Tatras (2655 m)
- Minimum: Streda nad Bodrogom (94 m)
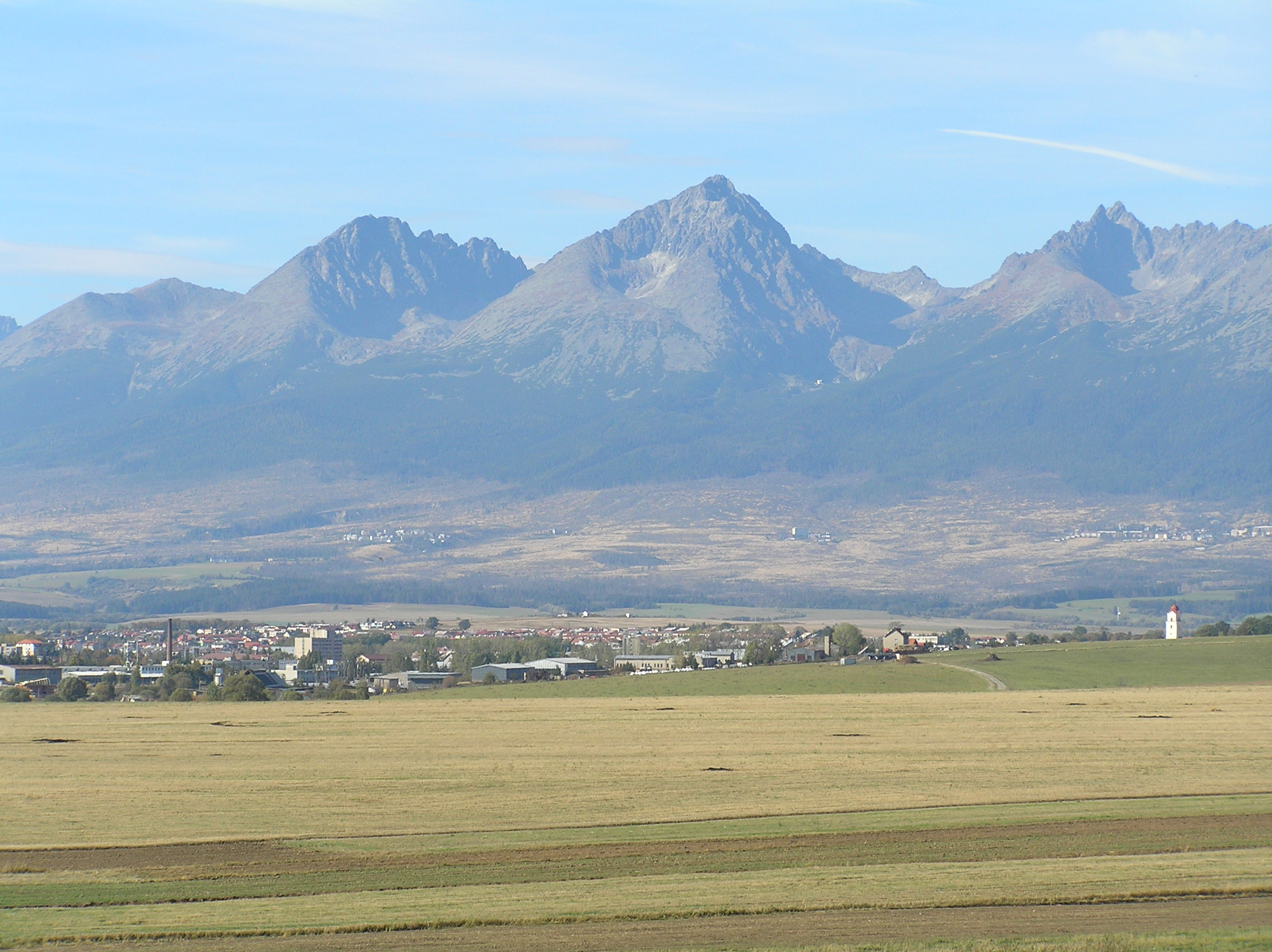
Highest point of Slovakia

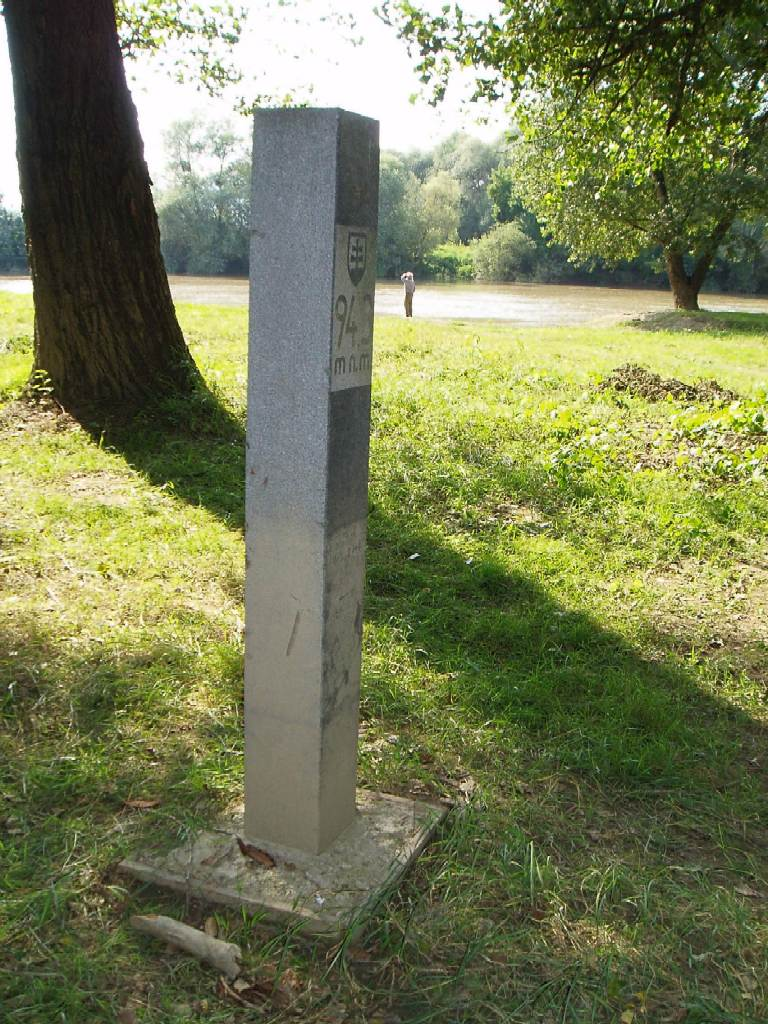
Lowest point of Slovakia

== Other features ==
- Longest river: Váh (402,5 km).
- Deepest mountain lake: Veľké Hincovo pleso, High Tatras (53 m deep, 20 hectares)
- Uppermost mountain lake: Modré pleso, High Tatras (2157 m above sea level)

== See also ==
- Extreme points of Europe
- Extreme points of Earth
