= Extreme points of Ethiopia =

Geography of Ethiopia

The extreme points of Ethiopia include the coordinates that are further north, south, east or west than any other location in Ethiopia; and the highest and the lowest elevations in the country.

== Latitude and longitude ==
- Northernmost point: 14°53′N 37°55′E
  bend in the Mareb River, Tigray Region
- Southernmost point: unnamed location on the border with Kenya near a hill immediately east of the Kenyan town of Moyale, Somali Region
- Easternmost point: the point of the triangular section of the Somali border; 8°0′N 48°0′E
  Somali Region
- Westernmost point: 7°57′N 33°0′E
  bend in the Pibor River opposite the South Sudanese village of Denjok, Gambela Region

== Elevation ==
- Highest point: Ras Dejen at 4,550 m (14,928 ft), in the Semien Mountains, Amhara Region.
- Lowest point: Afar Depression at −125 m (−410 ft) in the Afar Region.

== See also ==
- Geography of Ethiopia
- Extreme points of Africa
