= Geography of Western Sahara =

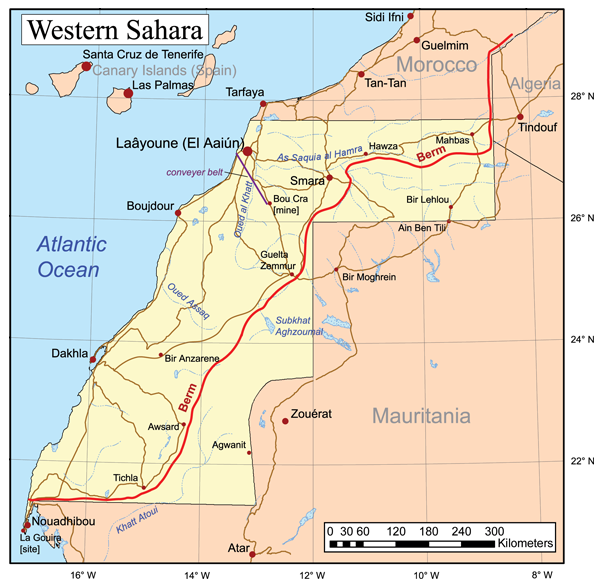
- Continent: Africa
- Region: North Africa
- Coordinates: 24°30′N 13°00′W
- Area: Ranked 78th
  - Total: 266,000 km^{2} (103,000 sq mi)
- Coastline: 1,110 km (690 mi)
- Borders: 2,046 kilometres (1,271 mi); (Algeria: 42 kilometres (26 mi); Mauritania: 1,561 kilometres (970 mi); Morocco: 443 kilometres (275 mi))
- Highest point: unnamed elevation: 701 metres (2,300 ft)
- Lowest point: Sebjet Tah, −55 metres (−180 ft)

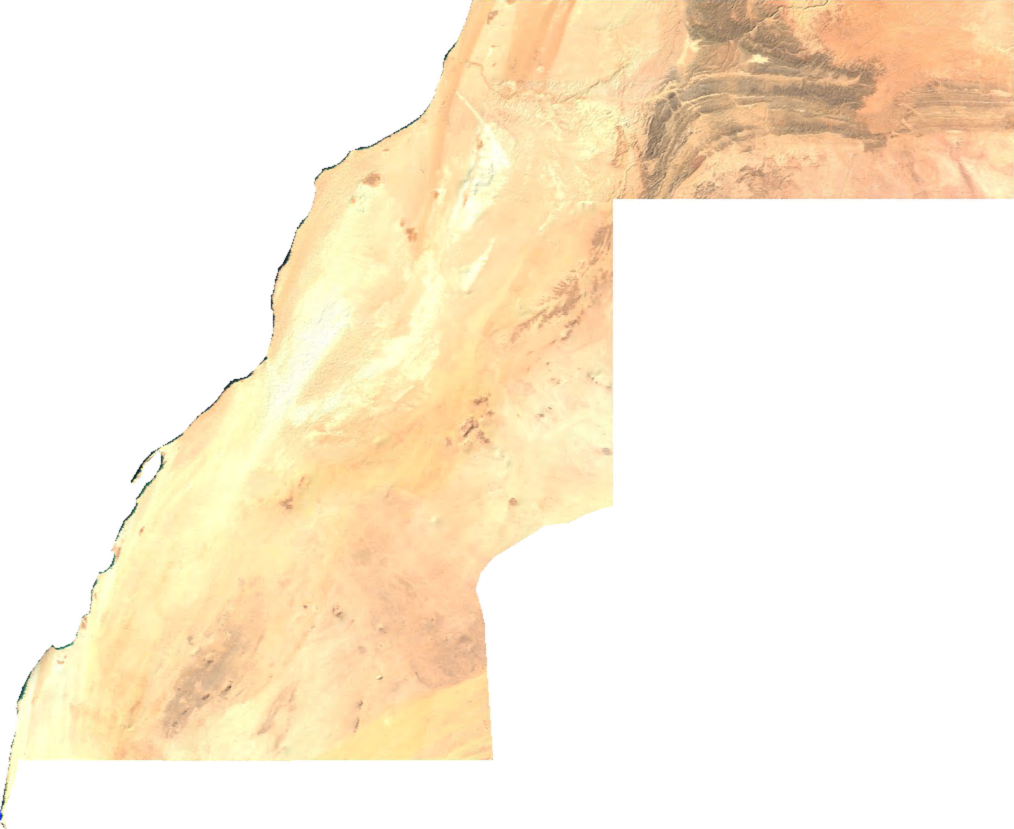
Satellite image of Western Sahara

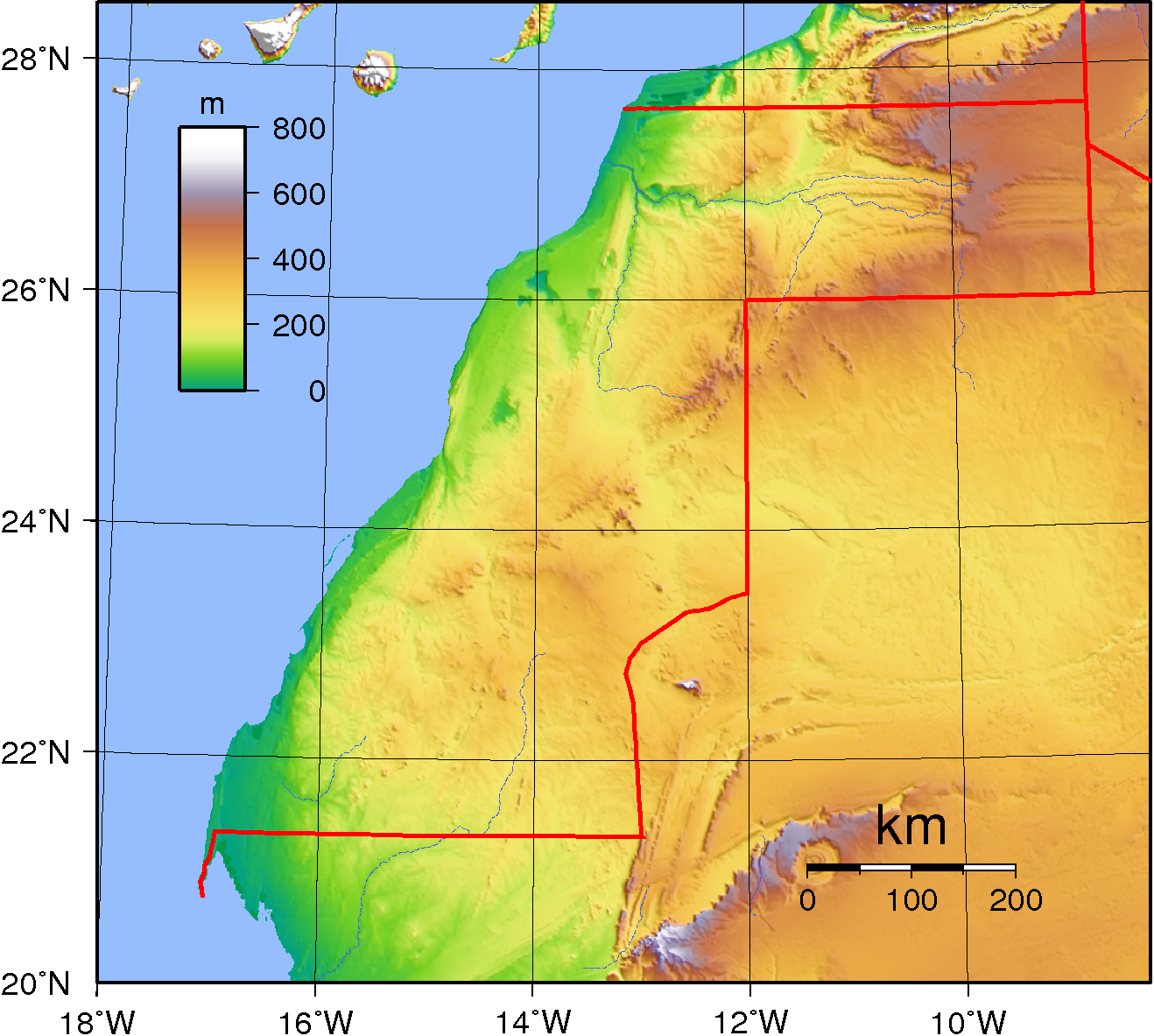
Topography of Western Sahara

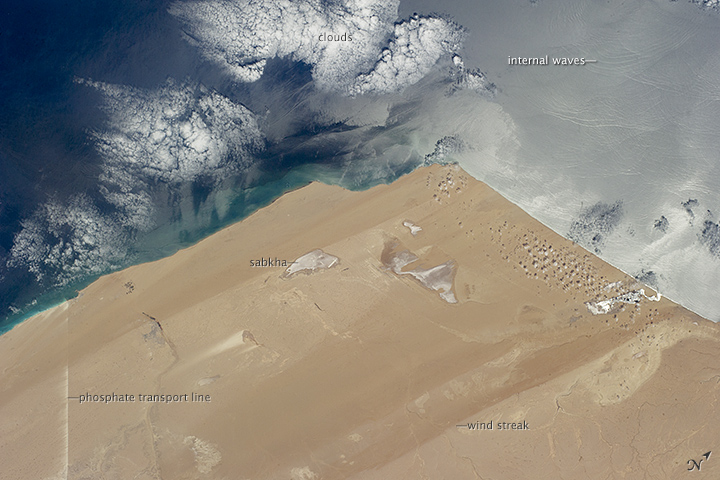
Desert Coast of Morocco and Western Sahara, 2014. North is to upper right corner of photo. Note the straight lines produced by strong northerly winds that blow parallel to the coast, producing wind streaks of sand and sand-free surfaces. Also note the transport corridor of roads, railroads and conveyor belt system (vertical line at left) that transport phosphates 100 kilometres (62 mi) from inland mines to the coast. Strong northerly winds blow dust and phosphate into the desert, giving a jagged edge to this line on its south side.

Western Sahara is a territory in Northern Africa, bordered by the North Atlantic Ocean, Morocco proper, Algeria (Tindouf region), and Mauritania. Geographic coordinates: 24°30′N 13°00′W

== Size of Western Sahara ==
=== Area ===
Western Sahara encompasses approximately 266,000 square kilometres (103,000 sq mi).

=== Geographic context ===
Western Sahara is bordered by Morocco to the north and Algeria to the east, Mauritania to the south, and the Atlantic Ocean to the west.

== Land ==
=== Terrain ===
The terrain is mostly low, flat desert with large areas of rocky or sandy surfaces rising to small mountains in south and northeast.

Elevation extremes:

Lowest point: Sebjet Tah, −55 metres (−180 ft), a depression in the northwest part of Western Sahara straddling the Morocco border
Highest point: Unnamed elevation, 701 metres (2,300 ft), east of Awsard (Aousserd)

=== Natural resources ===
Phosphates, iron ore, and fishing resources on Atlantic Ocean coast

=== Land use ===
Arable land: 0.02%

- Permanent crops: 0%
- Other: 99.98% (2005)

Irrigated land: N/A

=== Natural hazards ===
Hot, dry, dust/sand-laden sirocco wind can occur during winter and spring; widespread harmattan haze exists 60% of time, often severely restricting visibility. Flash flooding occurs during spring months.

== Environment ==
=== Climate ===
Western Sahara has a hot desert climate (Köppen climate classification BWh). Annual average rainfall is below 50 millimetres (2.0 in) everywhere. Along the Atlantic coast, average temperatures, both high and low, are constant and very moderated throughout the year because cool offshore ocean currents considerably cool off the climate, especially during the day. However, summertime is long and extremely hot and wintertime is short and very warm to truly hot further in the interior, where cooling marine influences aren't felt anymore. Average high temperatures exceed 40 °C (104 °F) in summer during a prolonged period of time but can reach as high as 50 °C (122 °F) or even more in places such as Smara, Tichla, Bir Gandus, Bir Anzarane, Aghouinite, Aousserd and others. Average high temperatures exceed 20 °C (68 °F) in winter but average low temperatures can drop to 7 °C (45 °F) in some places. The sky is usually clear and bright throughout the year and sunny weather is the norm.

Climate data for Laayoune (1981-2010 normals)
Month	Jan	Feb	Mar	Apr	May	Jun	Jul	Aug	Sep	Oct	Nov	Dec	Year
Mean daily maximum °C (°F)	22.2 (72.0)	22.7 (72.9)	24.5 (76.1)	23.9 (75.0)	25.6 (78.1)	27.4 (81.3)	29.5 (85.1)	30.4 (86.7)	30.0 (86.0)	28.6 (83.5)	26.0 (78.8)	23.2 (73.8)	26.2 (79.2)
Daily mean °C (°F)	16.9 (62.4)	17.6 (63.7)	19.2 (66.6)	19.2 (66.6)	20.7 (69.3)	22.5 (72.5)	24.5 (76.1)	25.2 (77.4)	24.7 (76.5)	23.3 (73.9)	20.8 (69.4)	18.0 (64.4)	21.1 (70.0)
Mean daily minimum °C (°F)	11.6 (52.9)	12.5 (54.5)	13.9 (57.0)	14.5 (58.1)	15.8 (60.4)	17.7 (63.9)	19.4 (66.9)	20.0 (68.0)	19.4 (66.9)	18.0 (64.4)	15.6 (60.1)	12.8 (55.0)	15.9 (60.6)
Average precipitation mm (inches)	11.1 (0.44)	11.1 (0.44)	5.4 (0.21)	1.1 (0.04)	0.5 (0.02)	0.0 (0.0)	0.1 (0.00)	0.5 (0.02)	1.5 (0.06)	3.0 (0.12)	9.8 (0.39)	13.3 (0.52)	57.4 (2.26)
Mean monthly sunshine hours	239.1	234.7	281.4	296.5	326.5	308.9	290.3	286.9	260.1	266.1	243.9	229.8	3,264.2
Source: NOAA

Climate data for Dakhla, Western Sahara
Month	Jan	Feb	Mar	Apr	May	Jun	Jul	Aug	Sep	Oct	Nov	Dec	Year
Record high °C (°F)	33.0 (91.4)	33.9 (93.0)	37.0 (98.6)	37.2 (99.0)	42.0 (107.6)	36.0 (96.8)	38.9 (102.0)	39.0 (102.2)	41.8 (107.2)	39.6 (103.3)	37.0 (98.6)	31.6 (88.9)	42.0 (107.6)
Mean daily maximum °C (°F)	20.9 (69.6)	22.7 (72.9)	23.7 (74.7)	23.3 (73.9)	24.0 (75.2)	24.8 (76.6)	25.7 (78.3)	26.5 (79.7)	27.4 (81.3)	26.6 (79.9)	25.1 (77.2)	22.5 (72.5)	24.4 (75.9)
Daily mean °C (°F)	18.1 (64.6)	18.4 (65.1)	20.0 (68.0)	19.2 (66.6)	19.9 (67.8)	20.7 (69.3)	21.9 (71.4)	22.7 (72.9)	23.0 (73.4)	22.6 (72.7)	20.8 (69.4)	18.7 (65.7)	20.5 (68.9)
Mean daily minimum °C (°F)	13.3 (55.9)	13.8 (56.8)	14.7 (58.5)	14.9 (58.8)	15.8 (60.4)	16.7 (62.1)	17.5 (63.5)	18.3 (64.9)	18.8 (65.8)	18.0 (64.4)	16.6 (61.9)	14.5 (58.1)	16.1 (61.0)
Record low °C (°F)	8.5 (47.3)	8.8 (47.8)	10.0 (50.0)	10.0 (50.0)	11.0 (51.8)	11.1 (52.0)	10.0 (50.0)	13.0 (55.4)	12.0 (53.6)	9.0 (48.2)	8.0 (46.4)	7.2 (45.0)	7.2 (45.0)
Average precipitation mm (inches)	2.3 (0.09)	2.8 (0.11)	1.0 (0.04)	0.0 (0.0)	0.4 (0.02)	0.0 (0.0)	1.4 (0.06)	2.1 (0.08)	10.9 (0.43)	6.3 (0.25)	2.6 (0.10)	9.8 (0.39)	39.7 (1.56)
Average precipitation days (≥ 0.1 mm)	0.9	1.0	0.6	0.5	0.7	0.2	0.3	0.8	1.8	0.9	1.3	1.6	10.7
Average relative humidity (%)	70	77	75	75	78	79	81	82	80	77	76	73	77
Mean monthly sunshine hours	254.2	245.8	275.9	276.0	306.9	291.0	266.6	272.8	249.0	254.2	240.0	241.8	3,174.2
Mean daily sunshine hours	8.2	8.7	8.9	9.2	9.9	9.7	8.6	8.8	8.3	8.2	8.0	7.8	8.7
Source: Deutscher Wetterdienst

== Extreme points ==
This is a list of the extreme points of Western Sahara, the points that are farther north, south, east or west than any other location.

- Northernmost points – the border with Morocco*
- Easternmost points – the northern section of the border with Mauritania/Algeria**
- Southernmost point – the southern tip of Ras Nouadhibou (Cabo Blanco/Cap Blanc)
- Westernmost point – Cape Dubouchage on Ras Nouadhibou
  - Note: Western Sahara does not have a northernmost point, the border being formed by a circle of latitude
  - Note: Western Sahara does not have an easternmost point, the border being formed by a meridian
