= Extreme points of Eurasia =

Eurasia

The extreme points of Eurasia are farther north, south, east or west than any other location on the continent. Some of these locations are open to debate, owing to the diverse definitions of Europe and Asia.

Mainland Eurasia is entirely located within the northern hemisphere and mostly within the eastern hemisphere, yet it touches the western hemisphere on both extremes. Thus, both the easternmost and westernmost points of Eurasia are in the western hemisphere. Mainland Eurasia crosses 200° of longitude and 76° of latitude north to south.

== Extremes of Eurasia, including islands ==
- Northernmost Point — Cape Fligeli, Rudolf Island, Franz Josef Land, Russia (81°50'N, 59°14'E)
- Southernmost Point — Dana Island, Rote Ndao, Indonesia (11°00'S, 122°52'E)
  - When Cocos (Keeling) Islands included as part of Southeast Asia, then South Island (12°11'22"S, 96°54'22"E)
- Westernmost point —Monchique Islet, Flores Island, Azores Islands, Portugal (39°29′42.8″N, 31°16′30″W)
- Easternmost point — Big Diomede, Russia (65°46'N, 169°03'W). The International Date Line runs between the Russian Big Diomede and the neighbouring U.S.-governed Little Diomede.

== Extremes of the Eurasian mainland ==
- Northernmost Point — Cape Chelyuskin, Russia (77°44'N, 104°15'E)
- Southernmost Point — Tanjung Piai, Malaysia (1°15'N, 103°30'E)
- Westernmost Point — Cabo da Roca, Portugal (38°46'N, 9°29'W)
- Easternmost Point — Cape Dezhnev, Russia (66°4'N, 169°39'W)

== Other ==
- Highest altitude: — Mount Everest, Nepal and China — 8,848 m (29,029 ft)
- Lowest point on dry land: — The shore of the Dead Sea, Palestine and Jordan, 418 m (1,371 ft) below sea level. See List of places on land with elevations below sea level.
- Farthest from the ocean: — A place near Hoxtolgay in China (46°17′N 86°40′E) 2,645 km (1,644 mi) from the nearest coastline. See Pole of inaccessibility.

== See also ==
- Geography of Europe
- Geography of Asia
- Extreme points of Europe
- Extreme points of Asia
- Extreme points of Afro-Eurasia
- Extreme points of Earth
