= List of extreme points of Hungary =

This is a list of the extreme points of Hungary: the points that are farther north, south, east or west than any other location, as well as the highest and lowest points.

== Latitude and longitude ==
- North: Füzér in Borsod-Abaúj-Zemplén county
- South: Beremend in Baranya county
- West: Felsőszölnök in Vas county
- East: Garbolc in Szabolcs-Szatmár-Bereg county
- Centre: Pusztavacs in Pest county

== Altitude ==
- Highest: Kékes mountain 1 014 m/3 330 ft
- Lowest: Tisza river near Szeged 78 m /259 ft

== Other features ==
- According to geographic research, the geographical centre of Europe can be found in Tállya, Borsod-Abaúj-Zemplén county.

== See also ==
- Extreme points of Europe
- Extreme points of Earth
