= List of extreme points of Belarus =

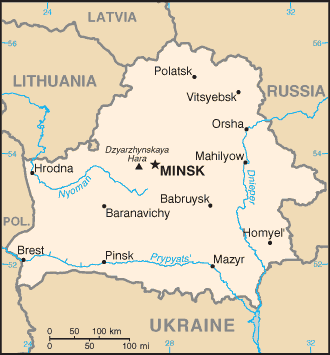
Map of Belarus

This is a list of the extreme points of Belarus, the points that are farther north, south, east or west than any other location.

== Latitude and longitude ==
- North: Verkhnyadzvinsk District, Vitebsk Region (56°10′N 28°07′E)
- South: Brahin District, Gomel Region (51°16′N 30°35′E)
- West: Kamenets District, Brest Region (52°17′N 23°11′E)
- East: Khotsimsk District, Mogilev Region (53°24′N 32°47′E)

== Altitude ==
- Maximum : Dzyarzhynskaya Hara, 345 m (53°51′N 27°04′E)
- Minimum : Nyoman River, 90 m

== See also ==
- Extreme points of Earth
- Geography of Belarus
