= List of extreme points of Serbia =

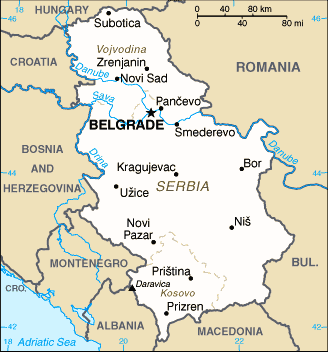
Map of Serbia

This is a list of the extreme points of Serbia: the points that are farther north, south, east, west, higher or lower than any other location.

== Latitude and longitude ==
- North : Hajdukovo
- South : Dragaš (with Kosovo) / Miratovac (without Kosovo)
- West : Bezdan
- East : Senokos

== Altitude ==
- Highest point : Midžor, 2 169 m
- Lowest point : Danube and Timok River, 35 m

== See also ==
- Extreme points of Europe
- Extreme points of Earth
- Geography of Serbia
