= Extreme points of Mexico =

This is a list of the extreme coordinates of Mexico, the points that are farther north, south, east or west than any other location.

- Easternmost point: 86° 42' 36" W longitude, southeast tip of Isla Mujeres, Quintana Roo.
- Westernmost point: 118° 22' 00" W longitude, Roca Elefante at Isla de Guadalupe, in the Pacific Ocean.
- Northernmost point: 32° 43' 06" N latitude Monumento 206, near Los Algodones, Baja California, at the United States border.
- Southernmost point: 14° 32' 27" N latitude, mouth of Suchiate River, border with Guatemala, in Suchiate, Chiapas.

== Elevation ==
- Highest elevation point: Pico de Orizaba; (Volcán Citlaltépetl) (Note: Pico de Orizaba is the highest point of Estado Libre y Soberano de Puebla, Estado Libre y Soberano de Veracruz de Ignacio de la Llave, and all of Mexico) 5,636 metres (18,491 ft) 19°01′48″N 97°16′12″W
- Lowest elevation point: Laguna Salada, Baja California at −10 metres (−33 ft)

== Transportation ==
- Northernmost airport: Mexicali International Airport in Mexicali Municipality, Baja California 32°37′50″N 115°14′29″W
- Southernmost airport: Tapachula International Airport in Tapachula Municipality, Chiapas 14°47′40″N 92°22′12″W
- Westernmost airport: Tijuana International Airport in Tijuana Municipality, Baja California 32°32′27″N 116°58′12″W
- Easternmost airport: Cancún International Airport in Benito Juárez Municipality, Quintana Roo 21°2′12″N 86°52′37″W

== See also ==
- Geography of Mexico
- Extreme points of the Earth
  - Extreme points of the Americas
    - Extreme points of North America
      - Extreme points of Canada
        - Extreme points of Canadian provinces
        - Extreme communities of Canada
      - Extreme points of Greenland
      - Extreme points of Mexico
      - Extreme points of the United States
        - Extreme points of U.S. states
          - Extreme points of Massachusetts
          - Extreme Points of Texas
        - Extreme points of New England
      - Extreme points of Central America
      - Extreme points of the Caribbean
        - Extreme points of Cuba
    - Extreme points of South America
