= Extreme points of the Caribbean =

Geographic points of islands in the Caribbean Sea

The following lists include the extreme and significant geographic points of the islands of the Caribbean Sea.

== Highest points ==
- Pico Duarte, (Note: Pico Duarte is the highest point on the Island of Hispaniola, the Dominican Republic, and all the islands of the Caribbean Sea) Dominican Republic, Hispaniola 19°1′23″N 70°59′53″W — highest summit of the Caribbean at 3175 m (10,417 feet)

== Lowest points ==
- Lago Enriquillo, Dominican Republic, Hispaniola 18°30′N 71°35′W — lowest lake on an island and lowest surface point on an ocean island on Earth at −46 m (−151 feet).
- Isthmus of Rivas, Rivas, Nicaragua 12°1′N 86°27′W — lowest pass between Caribbean Sea and Pacific Ocean on the Continental Divide of the Americas at 56 m (184 feet)

== Islands ==
- Island of Cuba 21°30′N 80°0′W — most extensive island of the Caribbean at 104,556 km^{2} (40,369 square miles)
- Hispaniola 19°1′23″N 70°59′53″W — tallest island of the Caribbean at 3175 m (10,417 feet) and second most extensive island of the Caribbean at 76,480 km^{2} (29,529 square miles)

== Lakes ==
The biggest lake in the Caribbean is the Lake Enriquillo.

== See also ==
- Geography of North America
- Geography of Canada
- Extreme points of the Earth
  - Extreme points of the Americas
    - Extreme points of North America
      - Extreme points of Canada
        - Extreme points of Canadian provinces
        - Extreme communities of Canada
      - Extreme points of Greenland
      - Extreme points of Mexico
      - Extreme points of the United States
        - Extreme points of U.S. states
          - Extreme points of Massachusetts
          - Extreme Points of Texas
        - Extreme points of New England
      - Extreme points of Central America
      - Extreme points of the Caribbean
        - Extreme points of Cuba
    - Extreme points of South America
      - Extreme points of Argentina
      - Extreme points of Brazil
      - Extreme points of Chile
      - Extreme points of Colombia
      - Extreme points of Peru
