= Extreme points of Central America =

This is a list of the extreme points of Central America, the points that are farther north, south, east, or west than any other location on the region. The list also included highest and lowest points and identifies the most extensive lake.

== Extreme points ==
- Northernmost point – Mexico–Belize border with Juan Sarabia
- Northernmost town – Corozal Town, Belize
- Southernmost point (mainland) – Punta Mariato, Panama
- Southernmost point – Cocos Island, Costa Rica
- Southernmost town – El Cacao, Panama
- Easternmost point – North America-South America border near Unguía, Colombia
- Easternmost town – Chepigana, Panama
- Westernmost point – Mouth of the Suchiate River, border with Mexico.
- Westernmost town – Malacatán, Guatemala

== Highest points ==
- Volcán Tajumulco, (Note: Volcán Tajumulco is the highest point of the Republic of Guatemala and all of Central America. Volcán Tajumulco is the southernmost and easternmost 4000 m (13,123-foot) summit of North America) San Marcos, Guatemala 15°2′37″N 91°54′12″W — highest summit of Central America at 4220 m (13,845 feet)

== Lowest points ==
- Isthmus of Rivas, Rivas, Nicaragua 12°1′N 86°27′W — lowest pass between Caribbean Sea and Pacific Ocean on the Continental Divide of the Americas at 56 m (184 feet)
- Caribbean shoreline — lowest surface point at sea level

== Lakes ==
- Lake Nicaragua, Nicaragua 11°37′N 85°21′W — most extensive lake at 8,264 km^{2} (3,191 square miles)

== See also ==
- Geography of Central America
- Extreme points of the Earth
  - Extreme points of the Americas
    - Extreme points of North America
      - Extreme points of Canada
        - Extreme points of Canadian provinces
        - Extreme communities of Canada
      - Extreme points of Greenland
      - Extreme points of Mexico
      - Extreme points of the United States
        - Extreme points of U.S. states
          - Extreme points of Massachusetts
          - Extreme Points of Texas
        - Extreme points of New England
      - Extreme points of Central America
      - Extreme points of the Caribbean
        - Extreme points of Cuba
    - Extreme points of South America
      - Extreme points of Argentina
      - Extreme points of Brazil
      - Extreme points of Chile
      - Extreme points of Colombia
      - Extreme points of Peru
