= Extreme points of North America =

Most prominent locations of the continent's physical boundaries

North America

This is a list of the extreme points of North America: the points that are highest and lowest, and farther north, south, east or west than any other location on the continent. Some of these points are debatable, given the varying definitions of North America.

== North America and surrounding islands ==
- Northernmost point — Kaffeklubben Island, Greenland 83°40′N 29°50′W. Although politically part of the Kingdom of Denmark, Greenland is geologically part of the North American Plate. If non-permanent islands are included, then the northernmost point is Qeqertaq Avannarleq. If Greenland is excluded from North America, the northernmost point is Cape Columbia, Ellesmere Island, Nunavut, Canada 83°8′N 74°13′W.
- Southernmost point — Cocos Island, Costa Rica 5°31′8″N 87°4′18″W
- Westernmost point — The westernmost point depends on the definition of "westernmost". If following the International Date Line, it would be Cape Wrangell on Attu Island, Alaska, United States 52°55′28″N 172°28′22″E, or the tiny (ca. 200m diameter) Peaked Island, just off the coast to the west. However, if the border between east and west is defined by the 180th meridian, the westernmost point is the West Point of Amatignak Island 51°17′N 179°9′W, as Attu Island is in the Eastern Hemisphere.
- Easternmost point — Nordostrundingen, Greenland 81°26′25″N 11°29′22″W. If Greenland is excluded, then the easternmost point is Cape Spear, Newfoundland, Canada 47°31′25″N 52°37′10″W. Again, if one uses the technical definition of longitude, it is Pochnoi Point on Semisopochnoi Island, Alaska, 51°57′N 179°52′E since the state stretches into the Eastern Hemisphere. However, other sources argue it would be Cape Wrangell on Attu Island, Alaska, United States at 52°55′28″N 172°28′22″E, as well as the tiny (ca. 200m diameter) Peaked Island, just off the coast to the west.

== Continental North America ==
- Northernmost point — Murchison Promontory, Canada 71°58′N 094°57′W
- Southernmost point — Punta Mariato, Panama 7°12′32″N 80°53′10″W
- Westernmost point — Cape Prince of Wales, Alaska 65°35′47″N 168°5′5″W
- Easternmost point — Cape Saint Charles, Labrador 52°13′3″N 55°37′15″W

== Highest points ==
- Denali, Alaska, United States 63°4′10″N 151°0′26″W — highest summit of North America at 6,190.5 m (20,310 feet).
- Pico de Orizaba (Volcán Citlaltépetl), (Note: Pico de Orizaba is the highest point of Estado Libre y Soberano de Puebla, Estado Libre y Soberano de Veracruz de Ignacio de la Llave, and all of México) Puebla and Veracruz, Mexico 19°1′50″N 97°16′11″W — highest volcano summit of North America at 5,636 m (18,491 feet).
- Grays Peak, (Note: The summit of Grays Peak is the highest point of the Front Range and the Continental Divide of North America.) (Note: The summit elevation of Grays Peak includes an adjustment of +1.881 m (+6.2 ft) from NGVD 29 to NAVD 88.) Colorado, United States 39°38′2″N 105°49′3″W — highest point on the Continental Divide of North America at 4,352 m (14,278 feet).
- Volcán Tajumulco, (Note: Volcán Tajumulco is the highest point of the Republic of Guatemala and all of Central America. Volcán Tajumulco is the southernmost and easternmost 4000 m (13,123-foot) summit of North America) San Marcos, Guatemala 15°2′37″N 91°54′12″W — highest summit of Central America at 4,220 m (13,850 feet).
- Gunnbjørn Fjeld, (Note: Gunnbjørn Fjeld is the highest point on the Island of Greenland, Kalaallit Nunaat, the Kingdom of Denmark, and the entire Arctic) Sermersooq, Island of Greenland, Greenland 68°55′10″N 29°53′55″W — highest island summit of the Americas and highest summit of the entire Arctic at 3,694 m (12,119 feet).
- Pico Duarte, (Note: Pico Duarte is the highest point on the Island of Hispaniola, the Dominican Republic, and all the islands of the Caribbean Sea) Dominican Republic, Hispaniola 19°1′23″N 70°59′53″W — highest summit of the Caribbean at 3,175 m (10,417 feet).
- Ixchiguán, San Marcos Department, Guatemala — highest town of North America at 3200 m (10,500 feet)
- Leadville, Colorado, United States 39°14′50″N 106°17′30″W — highest city of North America at 3094 m (10,152 feet)
- Lake County Airport, Colorado, United States 39°13′13″N 106°19′00″W — highest airfield of North America at 3026 m (9,927 feet)

== Lowest points ==
- Badwater Basin, Death Valley, California, United States 36°14′23″N 116°50′5″W — lowest land surface of North America at −282 ft (−86 m)
- Salton Sea, California, United States 33°19′59″N 115°50′3″W — lowest lake of North America at −69 m (−226 feet)
- Furnace Creek Airport, California, United States 36°27′50″N 116°52′53″W — lowest airfield of the Americas at −64 m (−210 feet)
- Furnace Creek, (Note: Furnace Creek in Death Valley, California, United States set the world record for the highest reliably reported ambient air temperature of 134 °F (56.7 °C) on July 10, 1913. This record has been eclipsed only once by a questionable reading of 136 °F (57.8 °C) recorded in 'Aziziya, Libya, on September 13, 1922.) California, United States 36°27′29″N 116°52′15″W — lowest settlement of the Americas at −58 m (−190 ft)
- Calipatria, California, United States 33°07′32″N 115°30′51″W — lowest city of the Americas at −56 m (−184 feet)
- Lago Enriquillo, Dominican Republic, Hispaniola 18°30′N 71°35′W — lowest lake on an island and lowest surface point on any ocean island on Earth at −27 m (−89 feet)
- New Orleans, Louisiana, United States 29°58′N 90°03′W — lowest city of the Americas with an average elevation of −0.5 m (−1.5 feet)
- Isthmus of Rivas, Rivas, Nicaragua 12°1′N 86°27′W — lowest pass between Caribbean Sea and Pacific Ocean (on the Continental Divide of the Americas) at 56 m (184 feet)
- Great Slave Lake bottom, Northwest Territories, Canada 61°40′N 114°00′W — lowest fresh water point of the Americas at −458 m (−1,503 feet)

== Other points ==
- The geographic center of the North American continent is located at 48°10′N 100°10′W, about 6 miles west of Balta in Pierce County, North Dakota, United States.
- The North American pole of inaccessibility is located at 43°22′N 101°58′W, about eleven miles southeast of the town of Kyle on the Pine Ridge Indian Reservation in Bennett County, South Dakota, United States, 1650 km (1025 miles) from the nearest coastlines.

== Islands ==
- Island of Greenland 68°55′10″N 29°53′55″W — most extensive island on Earth at 2,130,800 km^{2} (822,700 square miles) and tallest island of Western Hemisphere. Highest point is Gunnbjørn Fjeld at 12,118 feet (3,694 m).
- Island of Cuba 21°30′N 80°0′W — most extensive island of the Caribbean at 104,556 km^{2} (40,369 square miles). Highest point is Pico Turquino at 6,480 feet (1,980 m).
- Hispaniola 19°1′23″N 70°59′53″W — tallest island of the Caribbean and second most extensive island of the Caribbean at 76,480 km^{2} (29,529 square miles). Highest peak is Pico Duarte at 10,417 ft (3,175 m).
- Manitoulin Island in Lake Huron, Ontario, Canada 45°46′N 82°12′W — most extensive lake island on Earth at 2,766 km^{2} (1,068 square miles)
- Unimak Island — highest point is Shishaldin Volcano at 9,373 ft (2,857 m).
- Ellesmere Island — highest point is Barbeau Peak at 8,583 ft (2,616 m).
- Jamaica — highest point is Blue Mountain Peak at 7,402 ft (2,256 m).
- Axel Heiberg Island — highest point is Outlook Peak at 7,251 ft (2,210 m).
- Vancouver Island — highest point is Golden Hinde at 7,211 ft (2,198 m).
- Baffin Island — highest point is Mount Odin at 7,044 ft (2,147 m).
- Umnak Island — highest point is Mount Vsevidof at 6,920 ft (2,110 m).
- Unalaska Island — highest point is Makushin Volcano at 6,680 ft (2,040 m).

== Lakes ==
- Lake Superior, Canada and the United States 47°45′N 87°30′W — most voluminous lake in Western Hemisphere at 11,600 km^{3} (2,800 cubic miles)
- Great Slave Lake, Northwest Territories, Canada 61°40′N 114°00′W — deepest lake in Western Hemisphere at 614 m (2,014 feet)
- Lake Michigan–Huron, Canada and the United States 45°49′N 84°45′W — most extensive lake in Western Hemisphere and the most extensive fresh water lake on Earth at 117,702 km^{2} (45,445 square miles)
- Nettilling Lake on Baffin Island, Nunavut, Canada 66°30′N 70°50′W — most extensive lake on an island on Earth at 5,066 km^{2} (1,956 square miles)
- Great Salt Lake, Utah, United States 41°10′N 112°35′W — most extensive endorheic lake at 4,400 km^{2} (1,700 square miles)
- Lake Manitou on Manitoulin Island in Lake Huron, Ontario, Canada 45°46′42″N 81°59′30″W — most extensive lake on an island in a lake on Earth at 104 km^{2} (40 square miles)

== Rivers ==
- Mississippi Basin, Canada and the United States 29°9′4″N 89°15′12″W — most extensive river basin at 2,981,076 km^{2} (1,151,000 square miles)
- Mississippi-Missouri-Jefferson Rivers, United States 29°9′4″N 89°15′12″W — longest river system at 6,275 km (3,902 miles)
- Missouri River, United States 38°48′49″N 90°7′11″W — longest main stem river at 3,768 km (2,341 miles)
- Mississippi River, United States 29°9′4″N 89°15′12″W — longest Gulf of Mexico main stem river at 3,544 km (2,202 miles)
- Yukon River, Canada and the United States 62°35′55″N 164°47′40″W — longest Bering Sea main stem river at 3,185 km (1,979 miles)
- Nelson River, Manitoba, Canada 57°5′5″N 92°30′8″W — longest Hudson Bay main stem river at 2,575 km (1,600 miles)
- Colorado River, United States and Mexico 31°48′57″N 114°48′22″W — longest Gulf of California main stem river at 2,330 km (1,450 miles)
- Columbia River, Canada and the United States 46°14′39″N 124°3′29″W — longest Pacific Ocean main stem river at 2,000 km (1,243 miles)
- Mackenzie River, Northwest Territories, Canada 68°56′23″N 136°10′22″W — longest Arctic Ocean main stem river at 1,738 km (1,080 miles)
- Saint Lawrence River, United States and Canada 49°40′N 64°30′W — longest Atlantic Ocean main stem river at 965 km (600 miles)

== Extreme points of North American countries ==
- Extreme points of Canada
- Extreme points of Cuba
- Extreme points of Greenland
- Extreme points of Mexico
- Extreme points of the United States

== See also ==
- Geography of North America
- Extreme points of the Earth
  - Extreme points of the Americas
    - Extreme points of North America
      - Extreme points of Canada
        - Extreme points of Canadian provinces
        - Extreme communities of Canada
      - Extreme points of Greenland
      - Extreme points of Mexico
      - Extreme points of the United States
        - Extreme points of U.S. states
        - Extreme points of New England
      - Extreme points of Central America
      - Extreme points of the Caribbean
        - Extreme points of Cuba
    - Extreme points of South America
