= Extreme points of South America =

The extreme points of South America are the points that are farther north, south, east or west than any other location on the continent. The continent's southernmost point is often said to be Cape Horn, but Águila Islet of the Diego Ramírez Islands lies further south.

== Latitude and longitude ==
Geographic coordinates expressed in WGS 84.

=== South America ===
- Northernmost point: Bajo Nuevo keys in San Andrés y Providencia Department, Colombia (15°53′3″N 78°22′14″W) (Note: Extreme points of Colombia)
- Southernmost point can be either:
  - Águila Islet, Diego Ramírez Islands, Chile (55.980572161440634°S 67.29216529174083°W), or, if the South Sandwich Islands are included as part of South America:
  - Cook Island, South Georgia and the South Sandwich Islands (59°29′20″S 27°8′40″W)
- Westernmost point can be either:
  - Darwin Island, Galápagos Islands, Ecuador (01°40′44″N 92°00′33″W), or, if Easter Island is included as part of South America:
  - Motu Nui (27°12′4″S 109°27′18″W)
- Easternmost point can be either:
  - Ilha do Sul, Trindade and Martim Vaz, Brazil (20°29′50″S 28°50′51″W), or, if the South Sandwich Islands are included as part of South America:
  - Montagu Island, South Georgia and the South Sandwich Islands (58°30′43″S 26°16′7″W)

=== South America (mainland) ===
- Northernmost point: Punta Gallinas, Colombia (12°27′31″N 71°40′8″W)
- Southernmost point: Cape Froward, Chile (53°53′47″S 71°17′40″W)
- Westernmost point: Punta Pariñas, Peru (4°40′58″S 81°19′43″W)
- Easternmost point: Ponta do Seixas, Brazil (7°9′19″S 34°47′35″W)

Center: 40 km NWbN of Fuerte Olimpo, Alto Paraguay, Paraguay (20°43′8″S 58°3′39″W)

== Elevation ==
- Highest point: Aconcagua, (Note: The summit of Aconcagua is the highest point of Andes, Argentina, South America, all of the Americas and the entire Southern Hemisphere. Mount Aconcagua is the second most prominent summit on Earth.) Mendoza, Argentina32°39′12″S 70°0′40″W at 6961 m
- Lowest point: Laguna del Carbón, Santa Cruz, Argentina 49°34′34″S 68°21′5″W at −105 m

== See also ==
- Geography of South America
- Extreme points of the Earth
  - Extreme points of the Americas
    - Extreme points of North America
      - Extreme points of Central America
      - Extreme points of the Caribbean
    - Extreme points of South America
      - Extreme points of Argentina
      - Extreme points of Brazil
      - Extreme points of Chile
      - Extreme points of Colombia
      - Extreme points of Peru
