= Extreme points of the Americas =

This is a list of the extreme points of the Americas, the points that are farther north, south, east or west than any other location on the continent. The continent's southernmost point is often said to be Cape Horn, which is the southernmost point of the Chilean islands. The Americas cross 134° of longitude east to west and 124° of latitude north to south.

== The Americas including islands ==
- Northernmost point — Kaffeklubben Island, Greenland 83°40′N 29°50′W
- Southernmost point — Southern Thule, South Georgia and the South Sandwich Islands 59°25′16″S 27°13′50″W
- Easternmost point — Nordostrundingen, Greenland 81°26′25″N 11°29′22″W
- Westernmost point — Cape Wrangell on Attu Island, Alaska, United States 52°55′28″N 172°28′22″E (Note: According to the International Date Line)

== The continental Americas ==
- Northernmost point — Murchison Promontory, Nunavut, Canada 71°58′N 94°57′W
- Southernmost point — Cape Froward, Magallanes, Chile 53°56′S 71°20′W
- Easternmost point — Ponta do Seixas, Paraíba, Brazil 7°8′55″S 34°47′49″W
- Westernmost point — Cape Prince of Wales, Alaska, United States 65°35′47″N 168°5′5″W

== Highest points ==
- Aconcagua, (Note: The summit of Aconcagua is the highest summit of Andes, Argentina, South America, and all of the Americas. Mount Aconcagua is the second most prominent summit on Earth.) Mendoza Province, Argentina 32°39′12″S 70°0′40″W — highest summit of the Americas, the Western Hemisphere, and the Southern Hemisphere at 6,961 m (22,838 feet).
- Ojos del Salado, Chile and Argentina 27°06′34.6″S 68°32′32.1″W — highest volcano summit on Earth and second highest summit of the Americas, the Western Hemisphere, and the Southern Hemisphere at 6,893 m (22,615 feet).
- Denali, Alaska, United States 63°4′10″N 151°0′26″W — highest summit of North America at 6,190.5 m (20,310 feet).
- Volcán Tajumulco, (Note: Volcán Tajumulco is the highest point of the Republic of Guatemala and all of Central America. Volcán Tajumulco is the southernmost and easternmost 4000 m (13,123-foot) summit of North America) San Marcos, Guatemala 15°2′37″N 91°54′12″W — highest summit of Central America at 4,220 m (13,850 feet).
- Gunnbjørn Fjeld, (Note: Gunnbjørn Fjeld is the highest point on the Island of Greenland, Kalaallit Nunaat, the Kingdom of Denmark, and the entire Arctic) Sermersooq, Island of Greenland, Greenland 68°55′10″N 29°53′55″W — highest island summit of the Americas and highest summit of the entire Arctic at 3,694 m (12,119 feet).
- Pico Duarte, (Note: Pico Duarte is the highest point on the Island of Hispaniola, the Dominican Republic, and all the islands of the Caribbean Sea) Dominican Republic, Hispaniola 19°1′23″N 70°59′53″W — highest summit of the Caribbean at 3,175 m (10,417 feet).

== Lowest points ==
- Laguna del Carbón, Santa Cruz Province, Argentina 49°34′34″S 68°21′5″W — lowest surface point of the Americas, the Western Hemisphere, and the Southern Hemisphere at −105 m (−344 feet).
- Badwater Basin, Death Valley, California, United States 36°14′23″N 116°50′5″W — lowest surface point of North America at −85.0 m (−279 feet).
- Furnace Creek Airport, California, United States 36°27′50″N 116°52′53″W — lowest airfield of the Americas at −64 m (−210 feet).
- Furnace Creek, California, United States (Note: Furnace Creek in Death Valley, California, United States set the world record for the highest reliably reported ambient air temperature of 134°F (56.7°C) on July 10, 1913. This record has been eclipsed only once by a questionable reading of 136°F (57.8°C) recorded in 'Aziziya, Libya, on September 13, 1922.) 36°27′29″N 116°52′15″W — lowest settlement of the Americas at −58 m (−190 feet).
- Calipatria, California, United States 33°07′32″N 115°30′51″W — lowest city of the Americas at −56 m (−184 feet).
- Lago Enriquillo, Dominican Republic, Hispaniola 18°30′N 71°35′W — lowest surface point on any ocean island on Earth at −27 m (−89 feet).
- New Orleans, Louisiana, United States 29°58′N 90°03′W — lowest city of the Americas with an average elevation of −0.5 m (−1.6 feet).
- Isthmus of Rivas, Rivas, Nicaragua 12°1′N 86°27′W — lowest pass between the Caribbean Sea and the Pacific Ocean (on the Continental Divide of the Americas) at 47 m (154 feet).
- Great Slave Lake bottom, Northwest Territories, Canada 61°40′N 114°00′W — lowest fresh water point of the Americas at −458 m (−1,503 feet).

== Inland points ==
- The continental pole of inaccessibility of the Americas is located at 43°22′N 101°58′W, about eleven miles southeast of the town of Kyle on the Pine Ridge Indian Reservation in Bennett County, South Dakota, United States, 1,650 km (1,025 miles) from the nearest coastlines.
- The South American pole of inaccessibility is located at 14°03′S 56°51′W, near Arenápolis, Brazil, 1,519 km (944 miles) from the nearest coastlines.

== Islands ==
- Island of Greenland 68°55′10″N 29°53′55″W — most extensive island on Earth at 2,130,800 km^{2} (822,700 square miles).
- Island of Cuba 21°30′N 80°0′W — most extensive island of the Caribbean at 104,556 km^{2} (40,369 square miles).
- Hispaniola 19°1′23″N 70°59′53″W — tallest island of the Caribbean at 3,175 m (10,417 feet) and second most extensive island of the Caribbean at 76,480 km^{2} (29,529 square miles).
- Manitoulin Island in Lake Huron, Ontario, Canada 45°46′N 82°12′W — most extensive lake island on Earth at 2,766 km^{2} (1,068 square miles).

== Lakes ==
- Lake Superior, Canada and the United States 47°45′N 87°30′W — most voluminous lake in the Americas and the Western Hemisphere at 11,600 km^{3} (2,780 cubic miles).
- Great Slave Lake, Northwest Territories, Canada 61°40′N 114°00′W — deepest lake in the Americas and the Western Hemisphere at 614 m (2,014 feet).
- Lake Michigan–Huron, Canada and the United States 45°49′N 84°45′W — most extensive lake in the Americas and the Western Hemisphere and the most extensive fresh water lake on Earth at 117,702 km^{2} (45,445 square miles).
- Nettilling Lake on Baffin Island, Nunavut, Canada 66°30′N 70°50′W — most extensive lake on any island on Earth at 5,066 km^{2} (1,956 square miles).
- Lake Manitou on Manitoulin Island in Lake Michigan–Huron, Ontario, Canada 45°46′42″N 81°59′30″W — most extensive lake on an island in a lake on Earth at 104 km^{2} (40 square miles).

== Rivers ==
- Amazon Basin of Bolivia, Brazil, Colombia, Ecuador, Guyana, Peru, and Venezuela 0°10′S 49°0′W — most extensive river basin on Earth at 7,050,000 km^{2} (2,722,000 square miles).
- Mississippi Basin of Canada and the United States 29°9′4″N 89°15′12″W — most extensive river basin of North America at 3,225,000 km^{2} (1,245,000 square miles).
- Amazon River of Peru, Colombia, and Brazil 0°10′S 49°0′W — longest river in the Americas and the Western Hemisphere at 6,992 km (4,345 miles) and the most profuse river on Earth with an average discharge of 209,000 m^{3}/s (7,400,000 cubic feet per second).
- Mississippi-Missouri-Jefferson River System of the United States 29°9′4″N 89°15′12″W — longest river system of North America at 6,352 km (3,947 miles).
- Paraná River of Argentina, Brazil, Paraguay and Uruguay 19°13′21″S 46°10′28″W — the second most extensive river on the Americas, at 4,880 km (3,030 miles).
- Missouri River of the United States 38°48′49″N 90°07′11″W — longest river of North America at 3,767 km (2,341 miles).
- Mississippi River of the United States 29°9′4″N 89°15′12″W — longest Gulf of Mexico main stem river at 3,544 km (2,202 miles).
- Yukon River of Canada and the United States 62°35′55″N 164°47′40″W — longest Bering Sea main stem river at 3,185 km (1,979 miles).
- Nelson River of Manitoba, Canada 57°5′5″N 92°30′8″W — longest Hudson Bay main stem river at 2,575 km (1,600 miles).)
- Colorado River of the United States and Mexico 31°48′57″N 114°48′22″W — longest Gulf of California main stem river at 2,330 km (1,448 miles).
- Columbia River of Canada and the United States 46°14′39″N 124°3′29″W — longest eastern Pacific Ocean main stem river at 2,000 km (1,243 miles).

== See also ==
- Geography of the Americas
  - Geography of North America
  - Geography of South America
- Extreme points of the Earth
  - Extreme points of the Americas
    - Extreme points of North America
      - Extreme points of Central America
      - Extreme points of the Caribbean
    - Extreme points of South America
