= Extreme points of Canada =

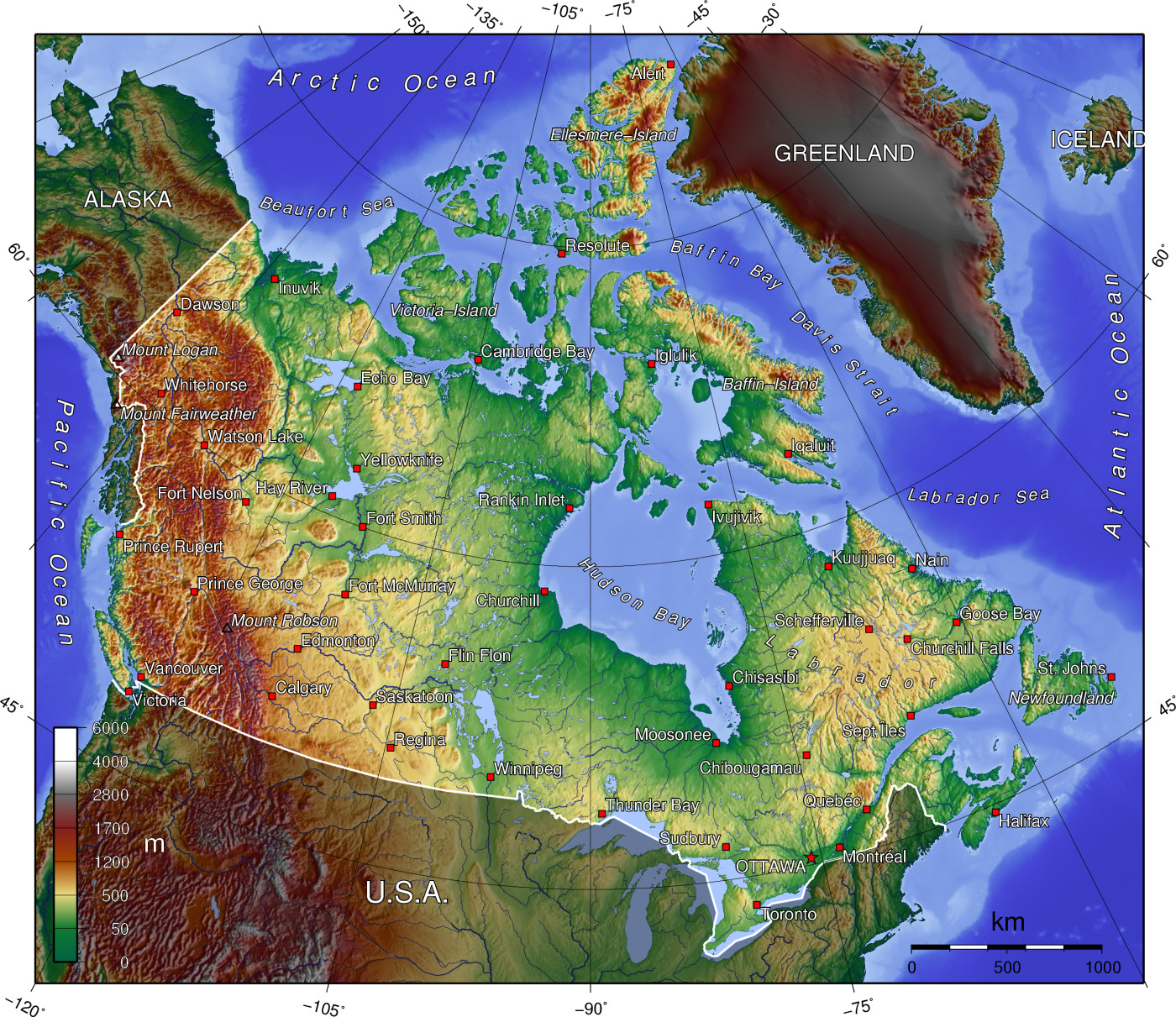
An enlargeable topographic map of Canada

The northernmost point of land within the boundaries of Canada is Cape Columbia, Ellesmere Island, Nunavut 83.111°N 69.972°W. The northernmost point of the Canadian mainland is Zenith Point on Boothia Peninsula, Nunavut 72.002°N 94.655°W. The southernmost point is Middle Island, in Lake Erie, Ontario (41°41′N 82°40′W); the southernmost water point lies just south of the island, on the Ontario–Ohio border (41°40′35″N). The southernmost point of the Canadian mainland is Point Pelee, Ontario 41.909°N 82.509°W. The lowest point is sea level at 0 m, while the highest point is Mount Logan, Yukon, at 5,959 m / 19,550 ft 60.567°N 140.405°W.

The westernmost point is Boundary Peak 187 (60°18′22.929″N 141°00′7.128″W) at the southern end of the Yukon–Alaska border, which roughly follows 141°W but leans very slightly east as it goes North 60.301°N 141.010°W. The easternmost point is Cape Spear, Newfoundland (47°31′N 52°37′W) 47.523°N 52.619°W. The easternmost point of the Canadian mainland is Elijah Point, Cape St. Charles, Labrador (52°13′N 55°37′W) 52.217°N 55.621°W.

Below includes a list of extreme and significant points of the geography of Canada.

== All Canada ==
Extreme points of Canada
- Northernmost point — Cape Columbia, Ellesmere Island, Nunavut 83°6′41″N 69°57′30″W
- Southernmost point — South point of Middle Island, Ontario, in Lake Erie 41°40′53″N 82°40′56″W
- Easternmost point — Cape Spear, Newfoundland 47°31′25″N 52°37′10″W
- Westernmost point — Boundary Peak 187 (Note: Starting from Boundary Peak 187, the Yukon-Alaska border follows the 141st meridian west directly north. This makes any point from the peak north to the Beaufort Sea tied for the westernmost point of Canada), Yukon 60°18′23″N 141°0′7″W, Yukon 60°18′23″N 141°0′7″W

== Non-insular (mainland) Canada ==
- Northernmost point — Zenith Point, Nunavut 72°0′0″N 94°38′59″W
- Southernmost point — Point Pelee, Ontario 41°54′33″N 82°30′32″W
- Easternmost point — Cape Saint Charles, Labrador 52°13′3″N 55°37′15″W
- Westernmost point — Boundary Peak 187 (Note: Starting from Boundary Peak 187, the Yukon-Alaska border follows the 141st meridian west directly north. This makes any point from the peak north to the Beaufort Sea tied for the westernmost point of Canada), Yukon 60°18′23″N 141°0′7″W

== Highest points ==
- Mount Logan (Note: The summit of Mount Logan is the highest point of the Saint Elias Mountains, the Yukon Territory, and all of Canada.) Yukon 60°34′33″N 140°24′10″W — highest Canadian summit at 5,959 m (19,551 ft)
- Barbeau Peak, (Note: The summit of Barbeau Peak is the highest point of Ellesmere Island, the Queen Elizabeth Islands, and Nunavut.) Ellesmere Island, Nunavut 81°54′30″N 75°1′30″W — highest Canadian island summit and highest summit of the Canadian Arctic at 2,616 m (8,583 ft)

== Lowest points ==
- Coastline — Canada has no naturally occurring points of land below sea level
- Great Slave Lake bottom, Northwest Territories 61°40′N 114°00′W — lowest fresh water point of North America at −614 m (−2,014 feet)

== Islands ==
- Baffin Island, Nunavut 63°33′N 65°26′W — most extensive Canadian island at 507,451 km^{2} (195,928 square miles)
- Ellesmere Island, Nunavut 81°55′36″N 74°59′12″W — tallest Canadian island at 2,616 m (8,583 ft)
- Island of Newfoundland, Newfoundland and Labrador 49°N 56°W — most extensive Canadian Atlantic island at 108,860 km^{2} (42,031 square miles)
- Vancouver Island, British Columbia 49°30′N 125°30′W — most extensive Canadian Pacific island at 31,285 km^{2} (12,079 square miles)
- Manitoulin Island in Lake Huron, Ontario 45°46′N 82°12′W — most extensive lake island on Earth at 2,766 km^{2} (1,068 square miles)

== Lakes ==
- Lake Superior, Ontario 47°45′N 87°30′W — most voluminous lake of Western Hemisphere at 11,600 km^{3} (2,800 cubic miles)
- Great Slave Lake, Northwest Territories 61°40′N 114°00′W — deepest lake of Western Hemisphere at 614 m (2,014 ft)
- Lake Michigan–Huron, Ontario 45°49′N 84°45′W — by some considerations the most extensive lake of Western Hemisphere and the most extensive freshwater lake on Earth at 117,400 km^{2} (45,300 sq mi)
- Nettilling Lake on Baffin Island, Nunavut 66°30′N 70°50′W — most extensive lake on an island on Earth at 5,066 km^{2} (1,956 square miles)
- Lake Manitou on Manitoulin Island in Lake Huron, Ontario 45°46′42″N 81°59′30″W — most extensive lake on an island in a lake on Earth at 104 km^{2} (40 square miles)
- Upper Dumbell Lake on Ellesmere Island Nunavut 82°28′N 062°30′W — most northern lake, there are more northern lakes but they are all unnamed and are only shown on detailed maps.

== Rivers ==
- Yukon River, British Columbia, Yukon, and Alaska 62°35′55″N 164°47′40″W — longest Bering Sea main stem river at 3,185 km (1,979 miles)
- Nelson River, Manitoba 57°5′5″N 92°30′8″W — longest Hudson Bay main stem river at 2,575 km (1,600 miles)
- Columbia River, British Columbia 46°14′39″N 124°3′29″W — longest Canadian Pacific Ocean main stem river at 2,000 km (1,243 miles)
- Mackenzie River, Northwest Territories 68°56′23″N 136°10′22″W — longest Canadian Arctic Ocean main stem river at 1,738 km (1,080 miles)
- Saint Lawrence River, Ontario and Quebec 49°40′N 64°30′W — longest Canadian Atlantic Ocean main stem river at 965 km (600 miles)

== Extreme distances ==
- Greatest driving distance between any two points via the Canadian road network (including the Trans-Canada Highway Ferry): 9262 km from L'Anse Aux Meadows, Newfoundland and Labrador to Tuktoyaktuk, Northwest Territories.
- Greatest driving distance between any two points via the Canadian road network (excluding the Trans-Canada Highway Ferry): 9156 km from Old Fort, Quebec to Tuktoyaktuk, Northwest Territories.

== See also ==
Geography by province
- Geography of Canada
- Extreme points of North America
- Extreme points of Canadian provinces
- Extreme communities of Canada
- Nordicity
- Remote and isolated community
