= Point Pelee National Park =

National park of Canada in Ontario

- Parc national de la Pointe-Pelée
- IUCN category II (national park)
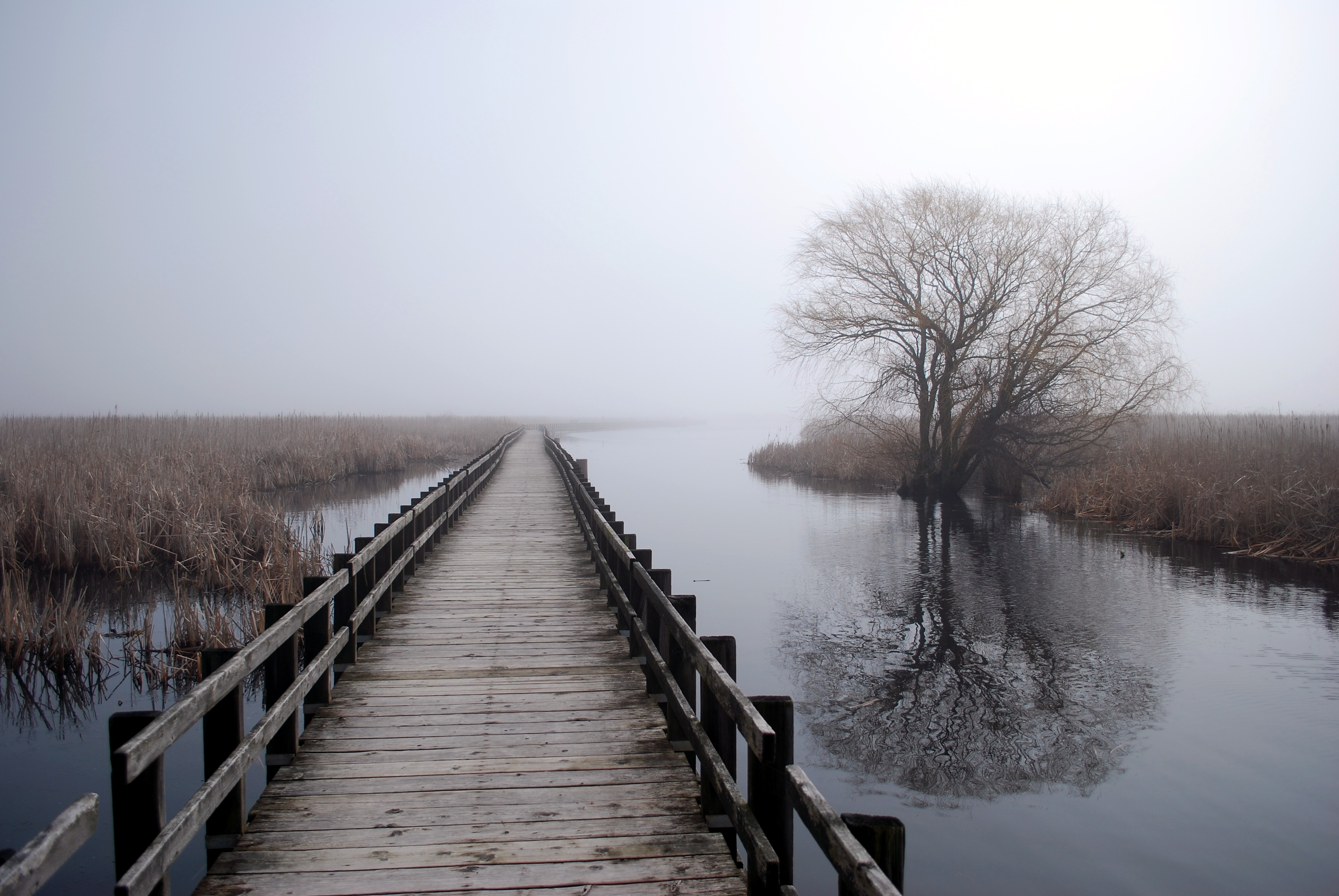
- Boardwalk in April

- Location within Canada Location within Southern Ontario
- Interactive map of Point Pelee National Park
- Location: Ontario, Canada
- Nearest city: Leamington, Ontario
- Coordinates: 41°57′51″N 82°31′4″W
- Area: 15 km^{2} (5.8 sq mi)
- Established: 29 May 1918; 108 years ago
- Visitors: 491,122 (in 2022–23)
- Governing body: Parks Canada

Ramsar Wetland
- Official name: Point Pelee
- Designated: 27 May 1987; 39 years ago
- Reference no.: 368

Point Pelee National Park (/ˈpiːliː/; French: Parc national de la Pointe-Pelée) is a national park in Essex County in southwestern Ontario, Canada where it extends into Lake Erie. The word pelée is French for 'bald'. Point Pelee consists of a peninsula of land, mainly of marsh and woodland habitats, that tapers to a sharp point as it extends into Lake Erie. Middle Island, also part of Point Pelee National Park, was acquired in 2000 and is just north of the Canada–United States border in Lake Erie. Point Pelee is the southernmost point of mainland Canada, and is located on a foundation of glacial sand, silt and gravel that bites into Lake Erie. This spit of land is slightly more than 7 kilometres (4.3 mi) long by 4.5 kilometres (2.8 mi) wide at its northern base. Established in 1918, Point Pelee was the first national park in Canada to be established for conservation. It was designated as a Ramsar site on 27 May 1987.

== History ==
Aboriginal people lived on Point Pelee for many years before European colonization, dating back to at least 6,000 years. The largest archaeological site found at Point Pelee is thought to have been occupied between AD 700 and 900.

The name was given to the area by Fathers Dollier and Galinée when they passed through the area in 1670.

In the late 1700s, British naval reserves logged the area's white pine for shipbuilding. In 1790, Deputy Indian Agent Alexander McKee negotiated a treaty with Aboriginal communities that ceded a large tract of land, which included Point Pelee, to the Crown. The Caldwell First Nation Chippewa people, who inhabited Point Pelee, were not signatories of that treaty. However, the Crown did not realize this, and their land was ceded nonetheless. Subsequently, they were forced off their land, and Point Pelee remains unceded Aboriginal land. This has been publicly acknowledged by the Department of Indian and Northern Affairs Canada.

Prior to the creation of the park, the Great Lakes Ornithological Club was established to study bird migration. One of the members, Percy A. Taverner, and Canada's first Dominion Ornithologist, recommended Point Pelee be made a national park in 1915. Jack Miner had also pushed for the creation of the park by that time. Point Pelee was made a national park in 1918 at the urging of birdwatchers and hunters. Commercial fishing continued in the park until 1969. Point Pelee was the only Canadian national park to allow hunting until duck hunting was ended in 1989. This site was named "Pointe-Pelée" (meaning "bald point") by French explorers because the eastern side was rocky and had no trees.

Point Pelee was designated a dark-sky preserve in 2006, the first Canadian national park to be designated as such. In March 2006, high winds caused waves that washed away the sand point and all that remained was a platform. In October 2007 the level of Lake Erie dropped enough to reveal the point again extending at least a kilometre out into the water and at least 7 metres (23 ft) wide with a winding curve shape to it. Since that time the sandy tip continues to shift, grow longer or shorter, or even detach temporarily, from year to year.

== Geography ==
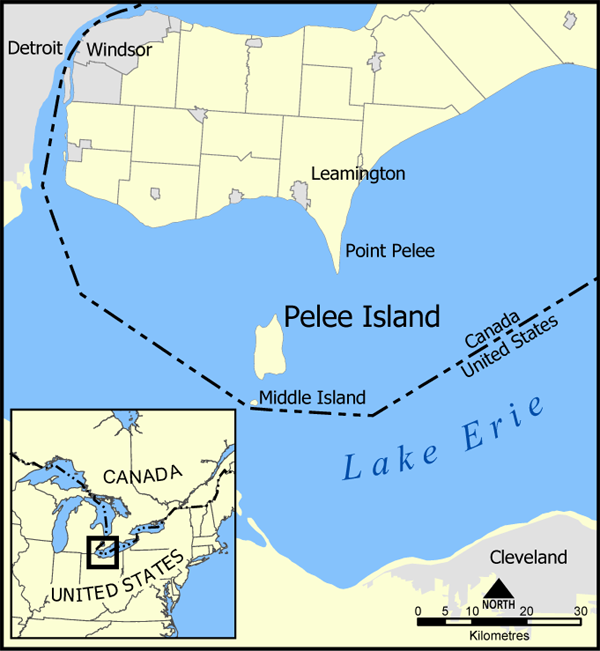
Pelee Island location

Located in the western parts of the St. Lawrence Lowlands, the park is a sandspit formation that extends 15 kilometres (9.3 mi) into Lake Erie and is up to 70 metres (230 ft) thick. With an area of only 1,564 hectares (3,860 acres), it is Canada's smallest national park. Most of the park (about 1,113 hectares (2,750 acres) or 70% of the park consists of marsh, dominated by cattails and ponds although forested areas make up a significant portion of the park, covering about 21% of the park. This sandspit is dominated by till plains which were formed during the last ice age during the advance and retreat of the Wisconsonian ice on a submerged limestone ridge. As the glacier melted and retreated northward, the Lake Erie basin began to fill with water. The movement of sediments altered the coastline, resulting in the present-day shape of Point Pelee. Subsequently, over the centuries, a thin but rich soil has formed. Mineral soils in the park were mapped as well to rapidly drained Eastport sand, which has insignificant profile development. The marshes began to form about 3,200 years ago, based on carbon dating. This was also the same time when the sands began to deposit, forming the present day barriers. The marsh has a closed drainage system owing to the separation of it by two barriers along the east and west side, which usually prevents the free exchange of water. However, when lake levels are higher, the marsh water levels fluctuate with the lake's water levels. The distinctive triangular shape at the southern tip of Point Pelee is caused by the convergence of these two barriers (this spit or tip is the southernmost point of the Canadian mainland). Middle Island, which is located south of the Point Pelee peninsula has an area of approximately 18.5 hectares (46 acres) and is the southernmost point in Canada. Virtually all of Middle Island is forested.

=== Flora and fauna ===
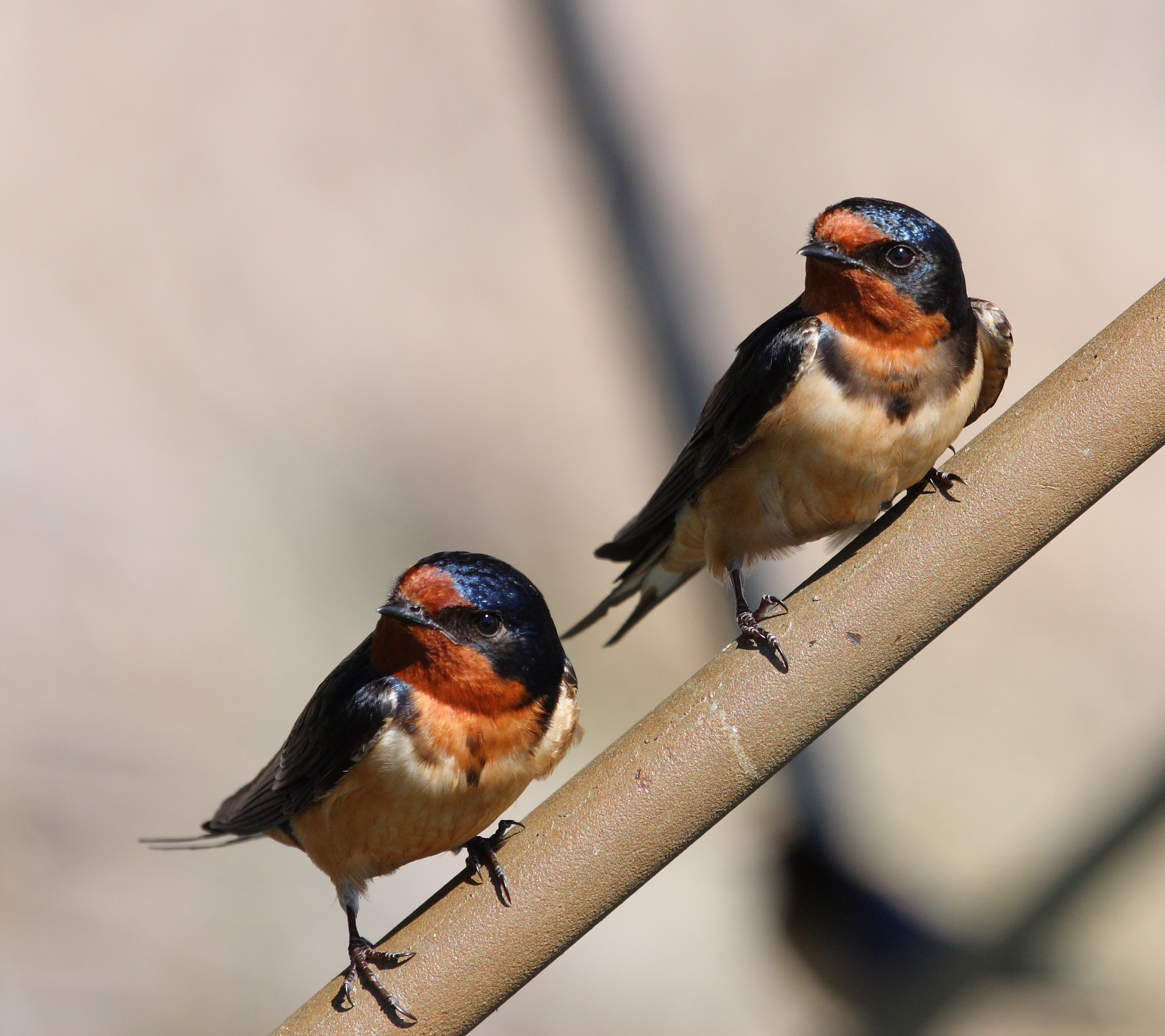
Barn swallows (Hirundo rustica) at Point Pelee National Park in May 2010

Owing to its southernly location and the moderating effects of Lake Erie, the climate in the park is slightly warmer than the rest of Canada and many Carolinian faunal species, which are rare in Canada are located here. Examples include the fox snake and the five-lined skink. Because of its location at the crossroads of two major migration flyways, about 347–360 different species of migratory birds have been recorded in the park and more than 100 species stay there for breeding. This total includes 102 waterfowl and shorebird species. Dominic Couzen's Top 100 Birding Sites of the World lists Point Pelee as #66. Coyotes are also present within this park. Many Carolinian floral species that are rare in Canada occur within the park boundaries. Point Pelee has six different habitats: beach, cedar, savanna, dry forest, wet forest, and freshwater marsh. The park contains more than 750 native plant species, of these 8 species are considered to be rare, endangered or threatened in Canada. Near Point Pelee is Middle Island which is designated provincially as an Area of Natural and Scientific Interest (ANSI) due to its unique and rare assemblages of plants and animals. Middle Island is home to plants and animals that are characteristic of the Carolinian ecozone of which nine species are at risk. The diversity of vegetation in the marsh is the highest along the edge of the marsh ponds and in the transitional zones between the terrestrial environments and the marsh. Four different vegetation communities dominate in the marsh.

== Climate ==
Point Pelee has a humid continental climate (Dfa under the Köppen climate classification) with warm, humid summers, and cold winters that is modified by the surrounding waters of Lake Erie. It lies in a zone that is characterized by variable weather due to conflict between polar and tropical air masses. Its position in Lake Erie modifies its climate, resulting in warmer winter and fall temperatures compared to inland regions, as the lake cools more slowly than the surrounding land though during the spring, temperatures remain cooler than inland areas due to the land warming faster than the lake.

Winters are cold with a January average temperature of −3.9 °C (25.0 °F). Owing to its position in Lake Erie, winter temperatures are warmer than inland locations at a similar latitude due to the release of the heat stored by the lake. As a result, temperatures below −20 °C (−4.0 °F) are rare, with only 1.9 days where the temperature reaches or falls below −20 °C (−4.0 °F). The maximum temperature usually stays below freezing on most days although mild spells of weather can occur time to time. The park receives 98.9 centimetres (38.9 in) of snowfall per year and there are 30.6 days with measurable snow. The park is not located in the snowbelt region, and snow cover is intermittent through the winter.

Summers are warm and humid with the warmest month, July, averaging 22.4 °C (72.3 °F), which is among the highest in Ontario. The surrounding lake moderates summertime temperatures, cooling the flow of warm air masses originating from the Gulf of Mexico and as a result, temperatures above 30 °C (86.0 °F) are rare, with only 4–8 days per year in the park.

Climate data for Point Pelee National Park
Month	Jan	Feb	Mar	Apr	May	Jun	Jul	Aug	Sep	Oct	Nov	Dec	Year
Record high °C (°F)	13.0 (55.4)	14.5 (58.1)	22.5 (72.5)	28.5 (83.3)	31.5 (88.7)	33.5 (92.3)	34.0 (93.2)	34.5 (94.1)	31.0 (87.8)	25.5 (77.9)	20.6 (69.1)	18.5 (65.3)	34.5 (94.1)
Mean daily maximum °C (°F)	−0.8 (30.6)	0.3 (32.5)	5.0 (41.0)	11.6 (52.9)	18.1 (64.6)	23.6 (74.5)	26.8 (80.2)	25.7 (78.3)	21.6 (70.9)	15.0 (59.0)	8.3 (46.9)	1.9 (35.4)	13.1 (55.6)
Daily mean °C (°F)	−3.9 (25.0)	−3.0 (26.6)	1.4 (34.5)	7.4 (45.3)	13.7 (56.7)	19.4 (66.9)	22.4 (72.3)	21.5 (70.7)	17.6 (63.7)	11.4 (52.5)	5.5 (41.9)	−0.7 (30.7)	9.4 (48.9)
Mean daily minimum °C (°F)	−6.9 (19.6)	−6.2 (20.8)	−2.2 (28.0)	3.1 (37.6)	9.3 (48.7)	15.1 (59.2)	18.0 (64.4)	17.2 (63.0)	13.6 (56.5)	7.8 (46.0)	2.6 (36.7)	−3.3 (26.1)	5.7 (42.3)
Record low °C (°F)	−27.0 (−16.6)	−24.0 (−11.2)	−18.0 (−0.4)	−9.8 (14.4)	−3.2 (26.2)	3.0 (37.4)	7.0 (44.6)	4.0 (39.2)	−1.7 (28.9)	−5.5 (22.1)	−9.4 (15.1)	−23.0 (−9.4)	−27.0 (−16.6)
Average precipitation mm (inches)	57.2 (2.25)	58.7 (2.31)	69.9 (2.75)	75.6 (2.98)	76.9 (3.03)	79.8 (3.14)	83.6 (3.29)	85.9 (3.38)	92.7 (3.65)	69.6 (2.74)	94.8 (3.73)	77.4 (3.05)	922.1 (36.30)
Average rainfall mm (inches)	27.9 (1.10)	31.3 (1.23)	51.7 (2.04)	71.7 (2.82)	76.9 (3.03)	79.8 (3.14)	83.6 (3.29)	85.9 (3.38)	92.7 (3.65)	69.6 (2.74)	90.9 (3.58)	56.8 (2.24)	818.8 (32.24)
Average snowfall cm (inches)	30.5 (12.0)	27.3 (10.7)	18.4 (7.2)	3.8 (1.5)	0.0 (0.0)	0.0 (0.0)	0.0 (0.0)	0.0 (0.0)	0.0 (0.0)	0.06 (0.02)	3.6 (1.4)	20.0 (7.9)	103.8 (40.9)
Average precipitation days (≥ 0.2 mm)	13.4	11.4	12.8	14.7	13.3	11.7	10.9	10.1	11.7	13.5	15.3	15.4	154.4
Average rainy days (≥ 0.2 mm)	4.7	4.9	9.0	14.0	13.3	11.7	10.9	10.1	11.7	13.5	14.2	8.9	127.1
Average snowy days (≥ 0.2 cm)	9.2	7.1	4.7	1.3	0.0	0.0	0.0	0.0	0.0	0.15	1.7	7.5	31.6
Source: Environment Canada

== Human impact ==
=== Development ===
From a regional perspective, the park is isolated from other natural areas because in Essex County, less than 6% of the native forest cover and 3% of the wetlands remain intact. Much of the area (97% of it) has been altered and mostly converted for agriculture, industry or urban development. It is also located relatively close to the major urban area of Windsor-Detroit.

== Birdwatching ==
The park forms the southernmost point in mainland Canada (its latitude is the same as that of Rome, Italy and Barcelona, Spain) and is part of a bird and butterfly migration corridor over Lake Erie via Point Pelee and the Lake Erie islands. Over 360 bird species have been recorded in the park. The peak time for bird migration is spring, especially May, when tired migrants make first landfall after their journey north across the lake.

Many birdwatchers from North America and abroad visit the park in May, often staying in the nearby town of Leamington. One attraction, apart from the sheer numbers and variety of birds passing through on migration, is the opportunity to see more northerly breeding species before they move on. It is widely recognized as one of the most desirable destinations for avid birdwatchers, particularly for the migration of passerines.

== Occurrences ==
=== March 2017 marsh fire ===
On 29 March 2017, Point Pelee's marsh land was involved in a fire that burned over 125 hectares (310 acres) of marsh habitat. The fire lasted 15 hours and was naturally extinguished due to rainfall the following day.

=== Commemoration ===
Point Pelee National Park was featured on a high-value ($5) postage stamp, issued in 1983, as part of a series honouring national parks. The park appeared on a stamp that was issued on 15 January 2018, with a $1.20 face value. The issue coincides with the park's centennial year, and is part of a nine-stamp set featuring scenic views across the country.

== Images ==
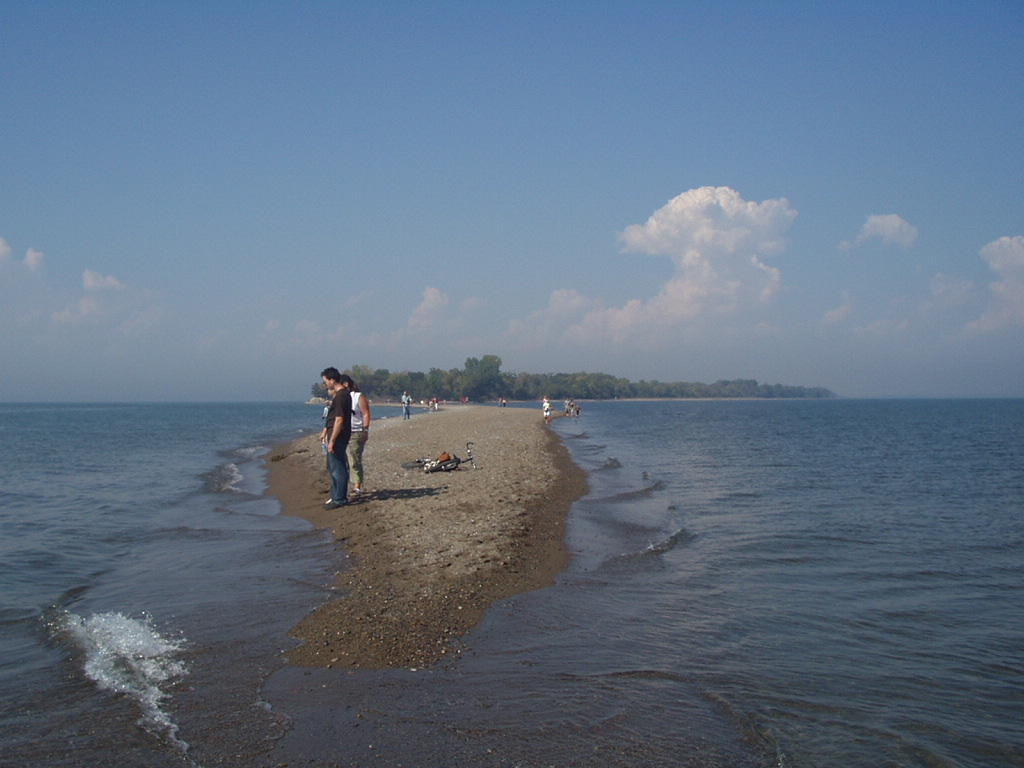
Point Pelee tip looking North, 2007

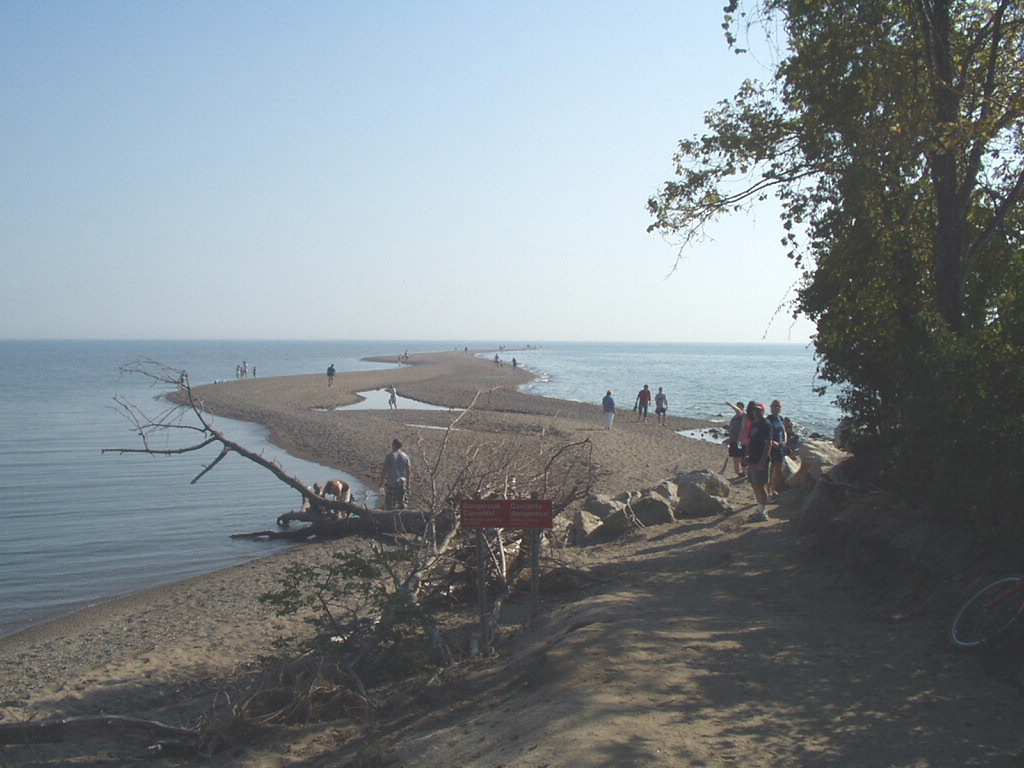
Point Pelee tip looking South, 2007

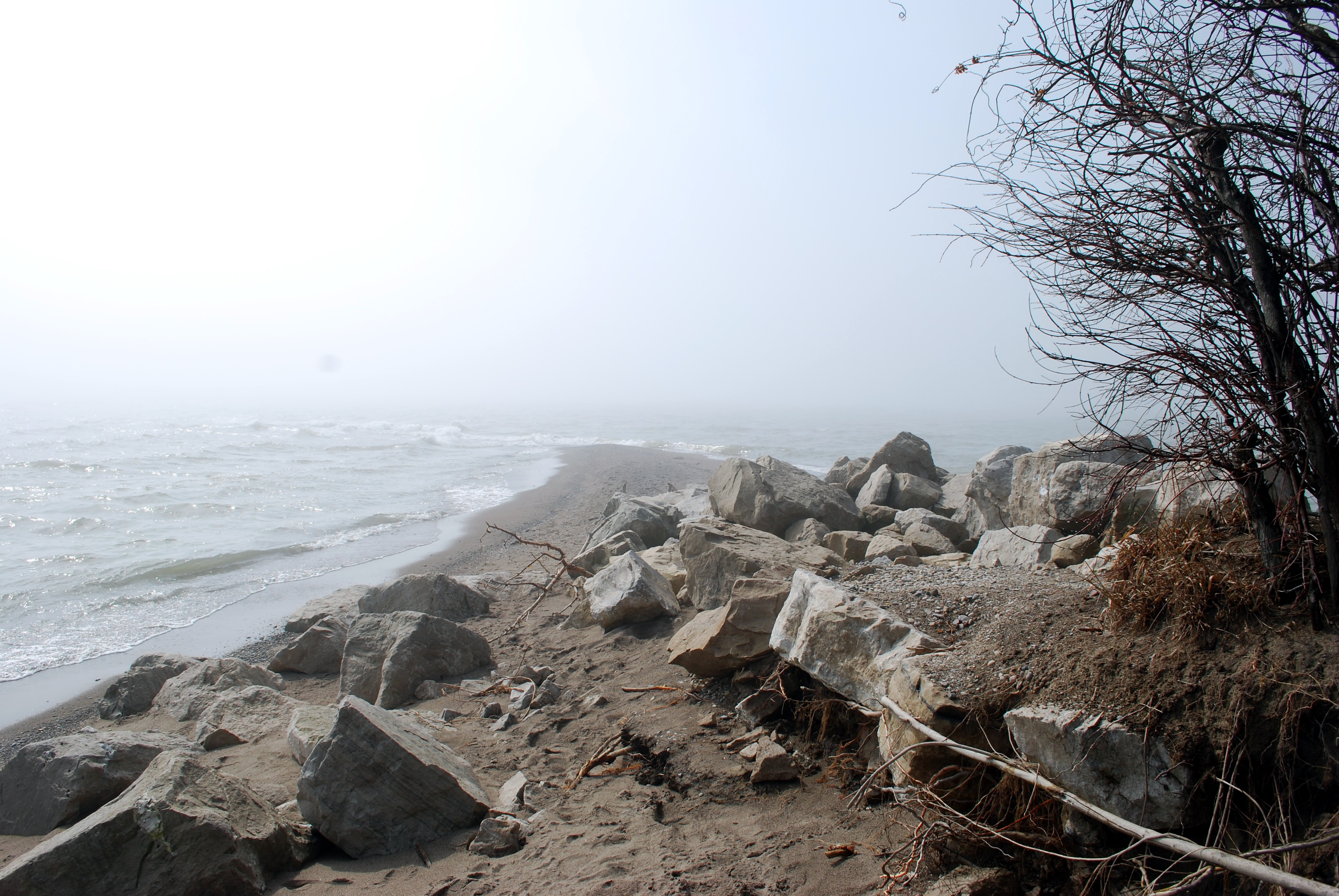
Point Pelee looking South, Apr 2008

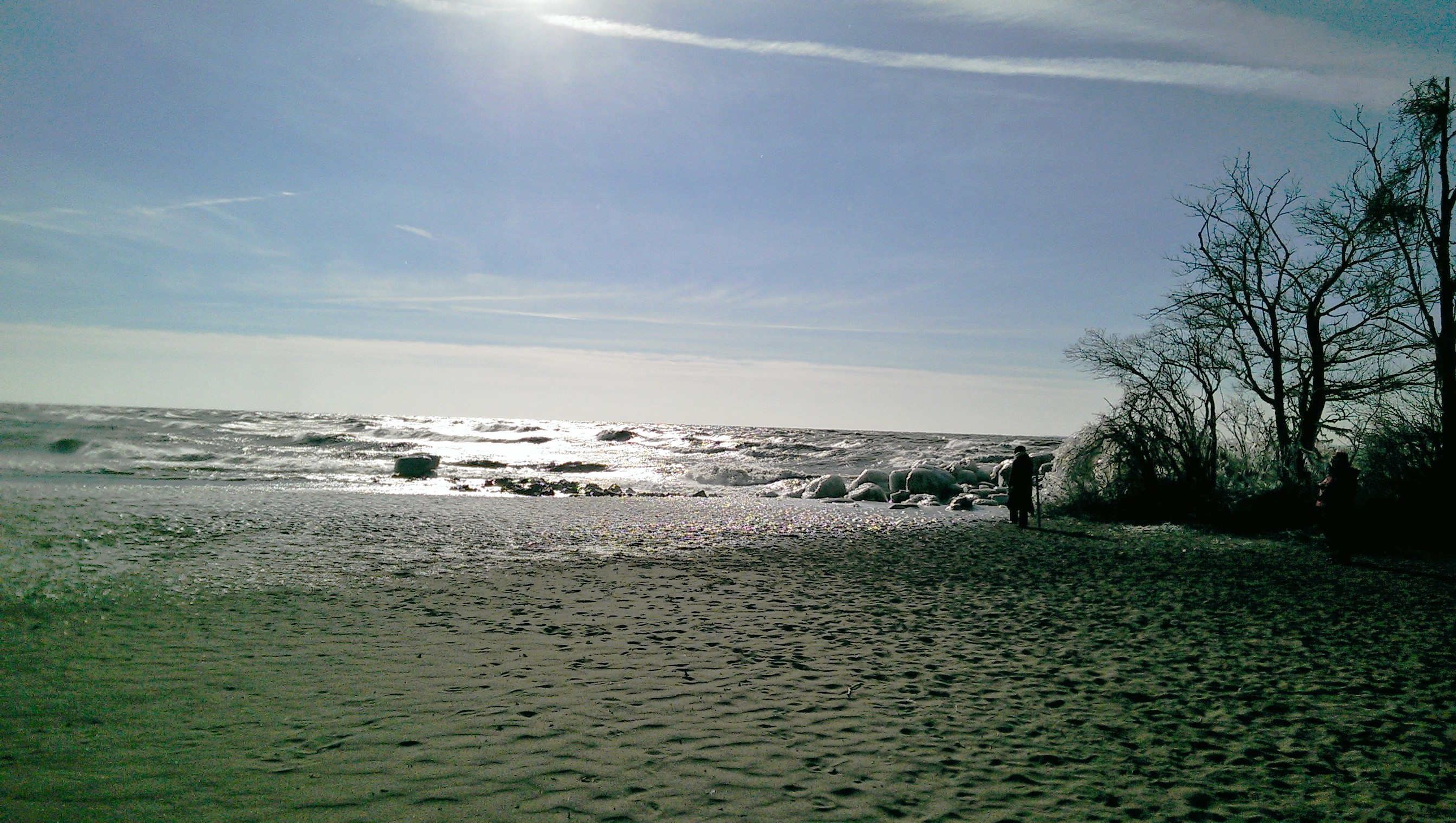
Point Pelee looking Southwest, Jan 2015

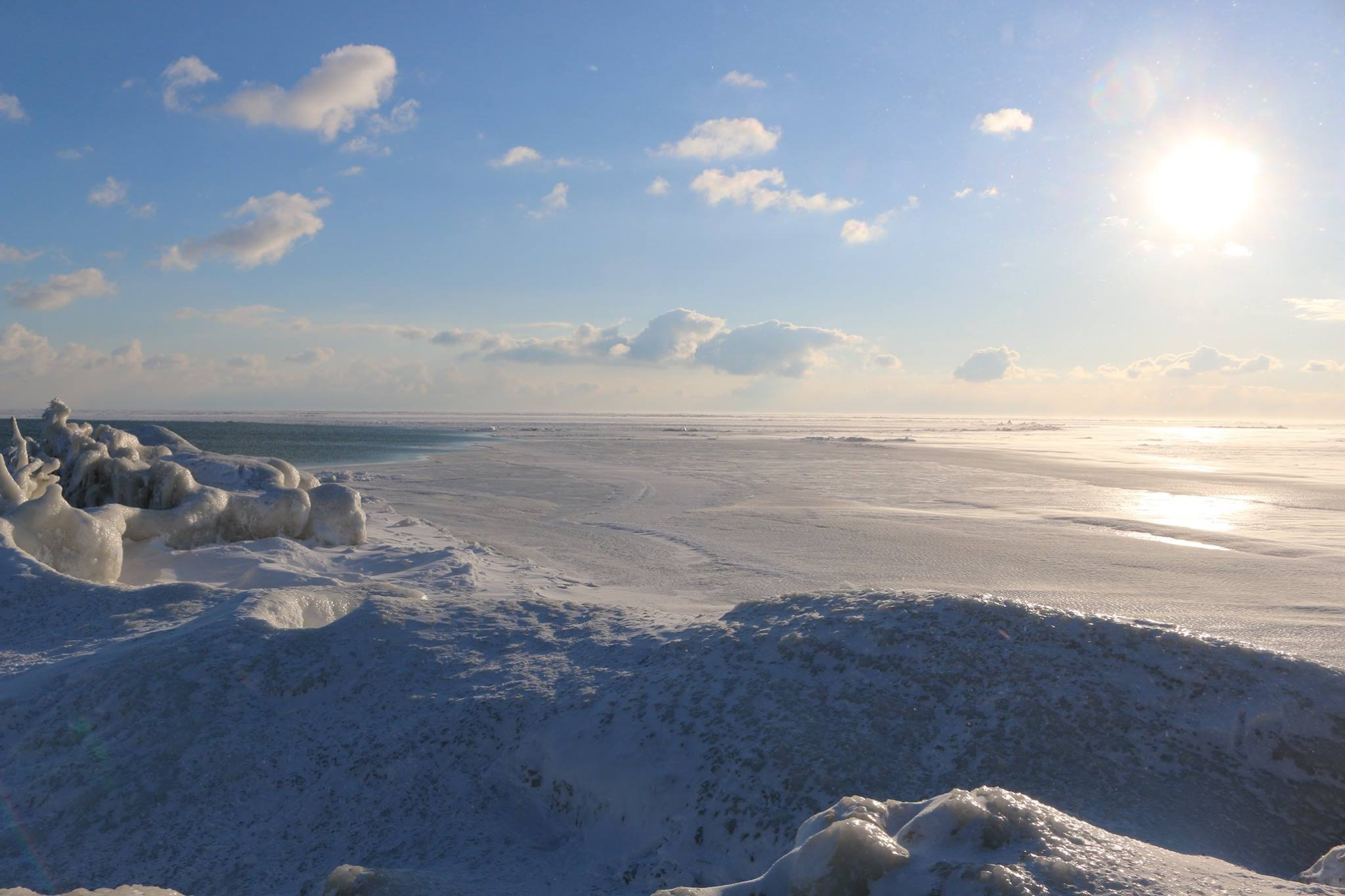
Point Pelee looking Southeast, Jan 2018

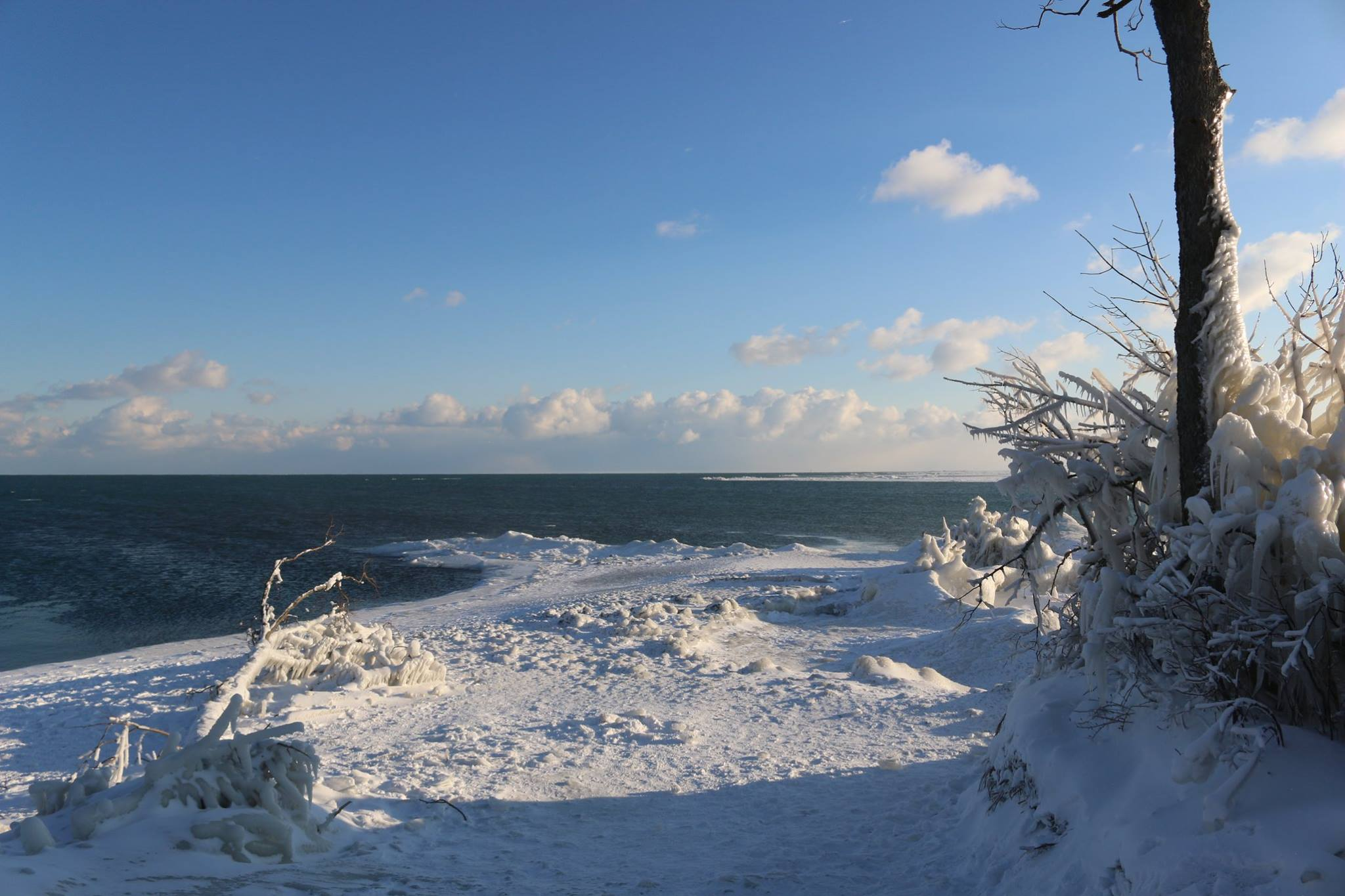
Pelee looking South, Jan 2018

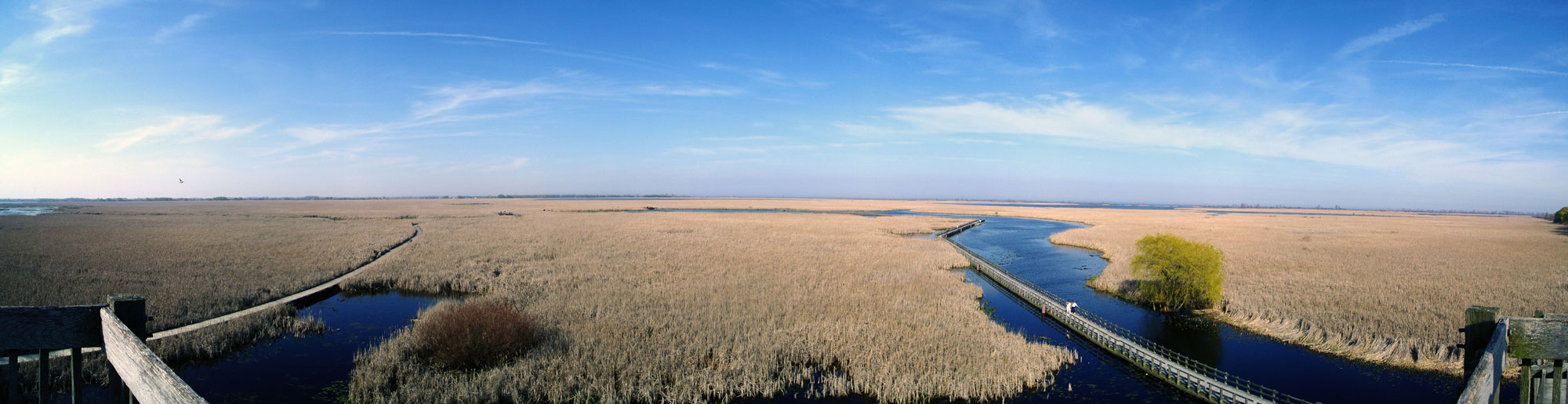
Boardwalk across a marsh in the park

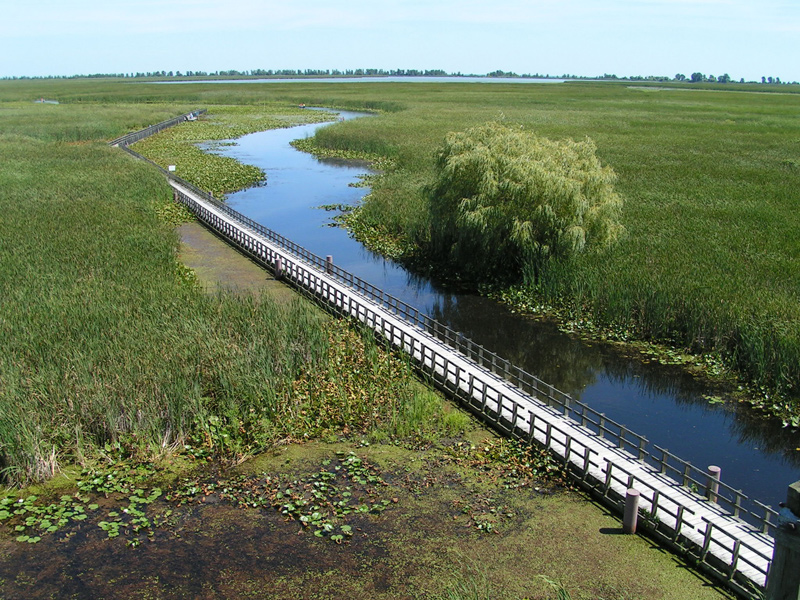
Boardwalk, August

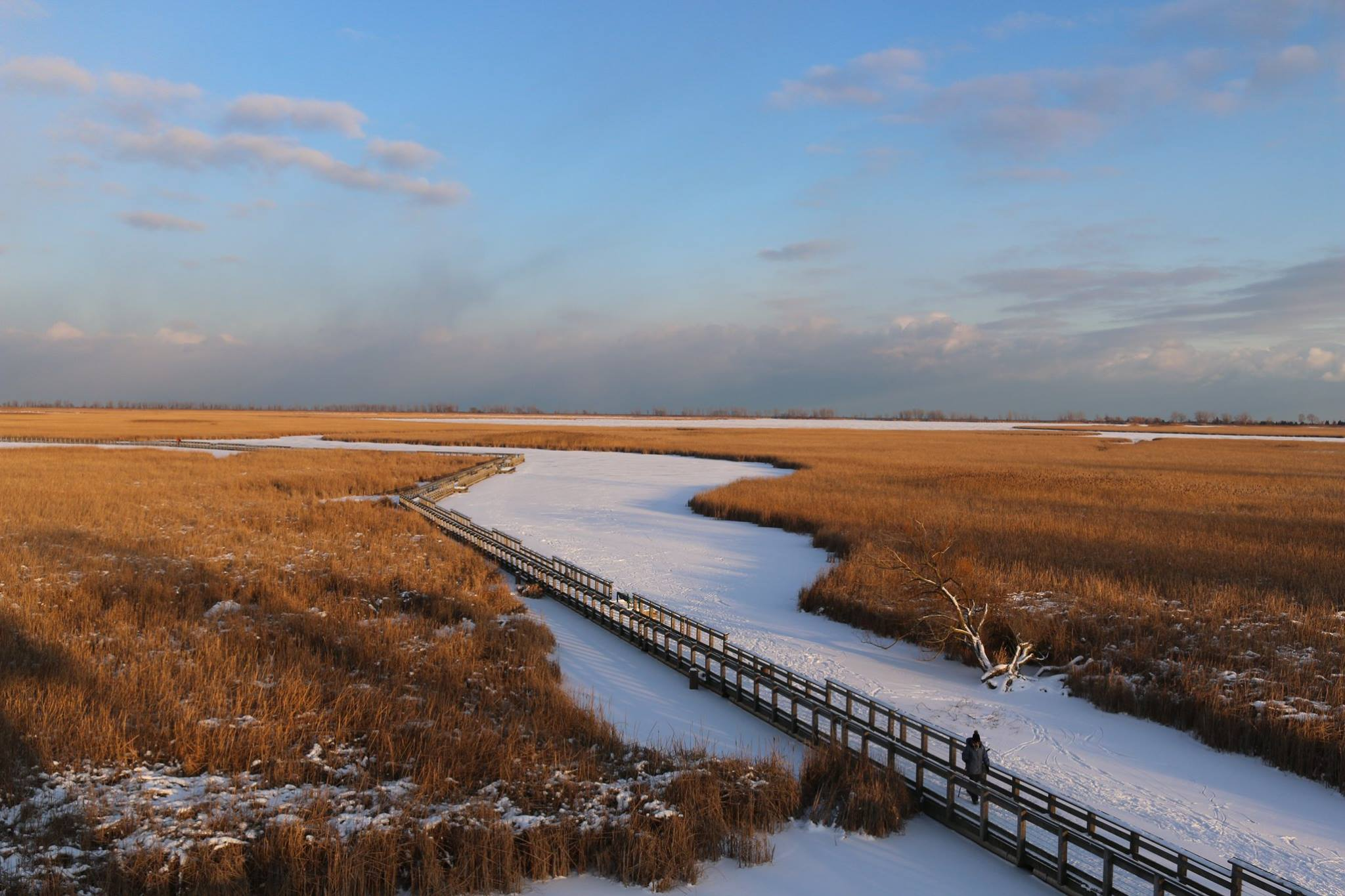
Boardwalk, January

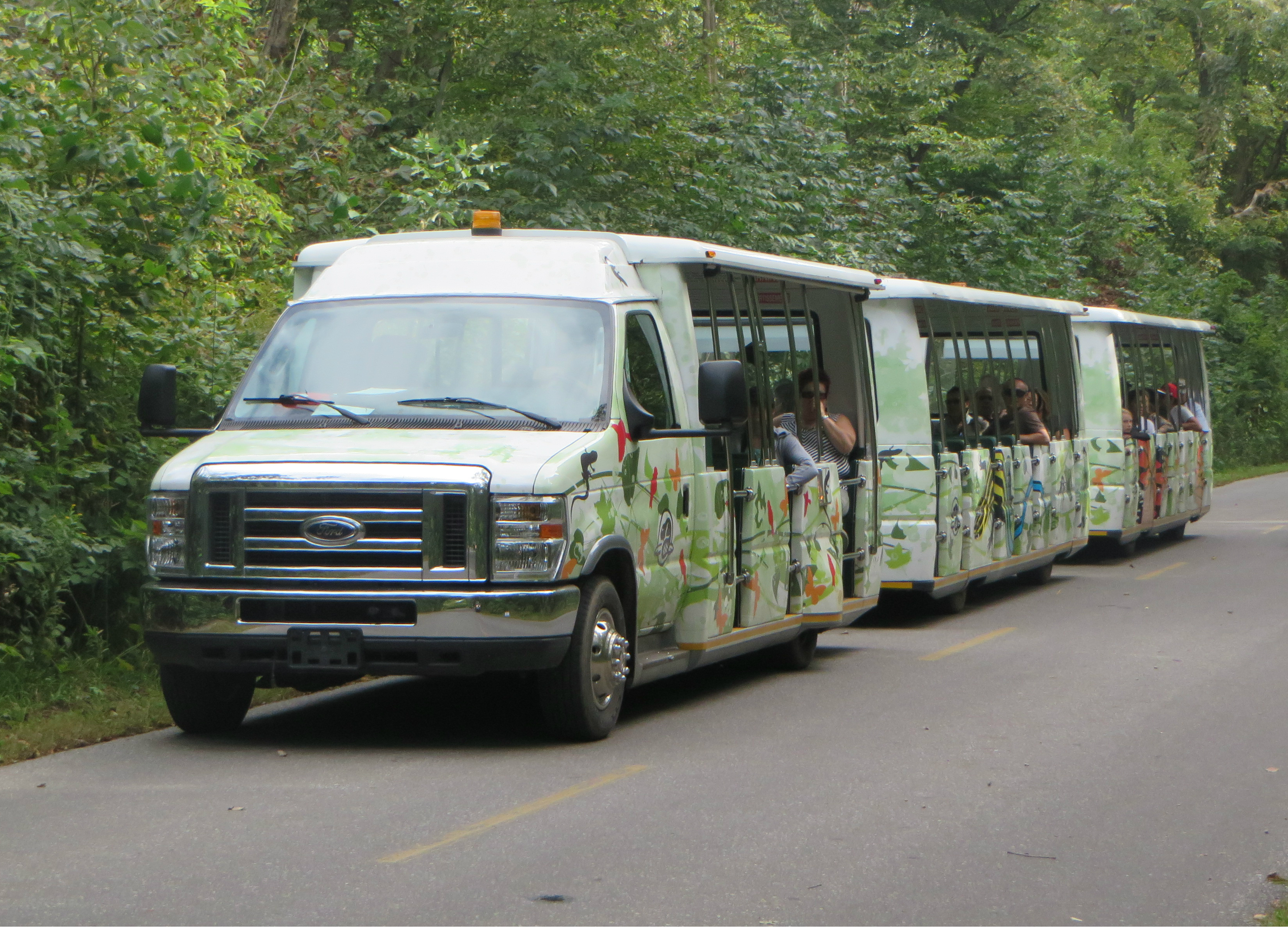
One of Point Pelee's shuttles

== See also ==
- National Parks of Canada
- List of National Parks of Canada
- Long Point, Ontario
