= Geography of South America =

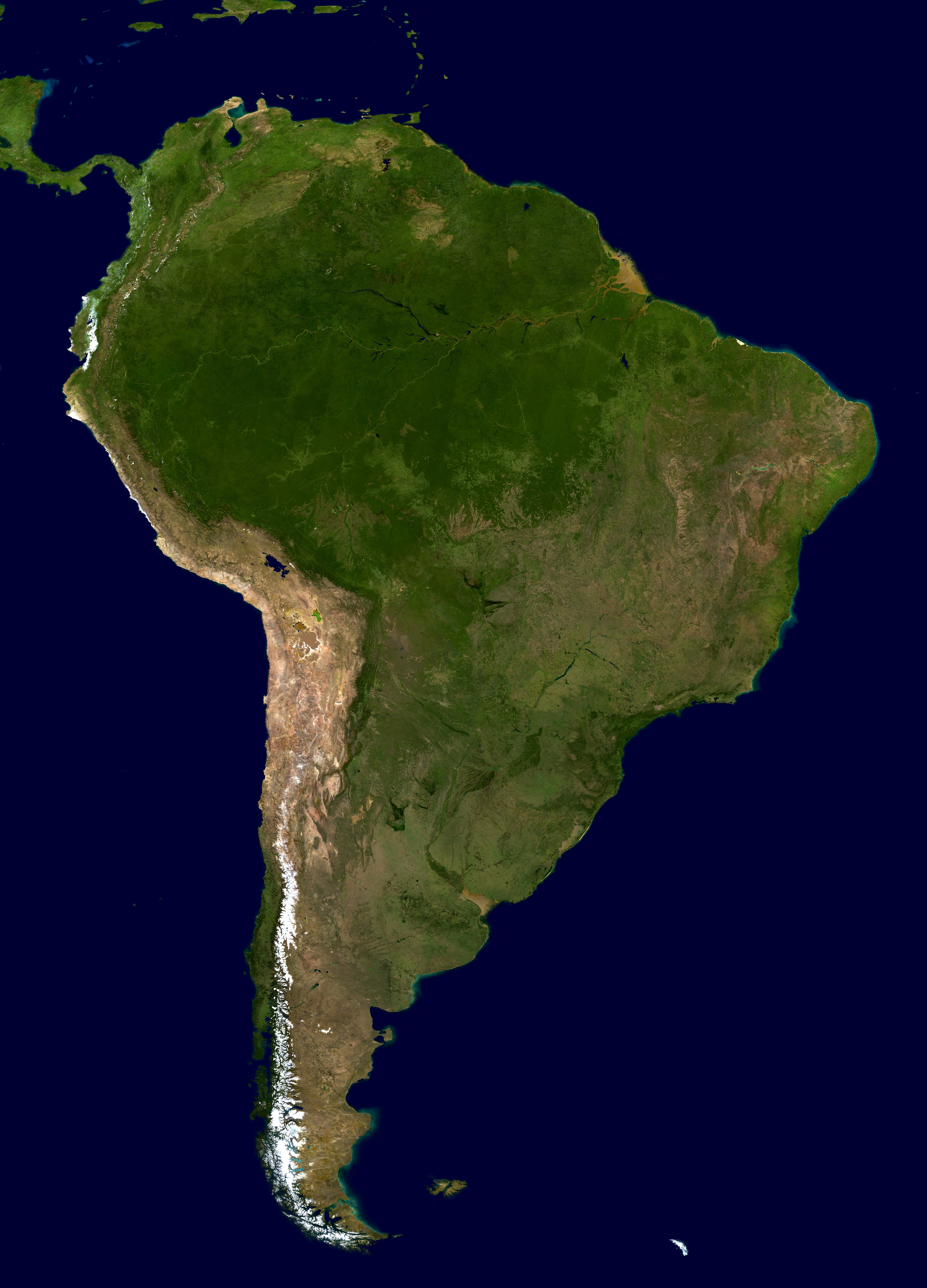
South America satellite orthographic

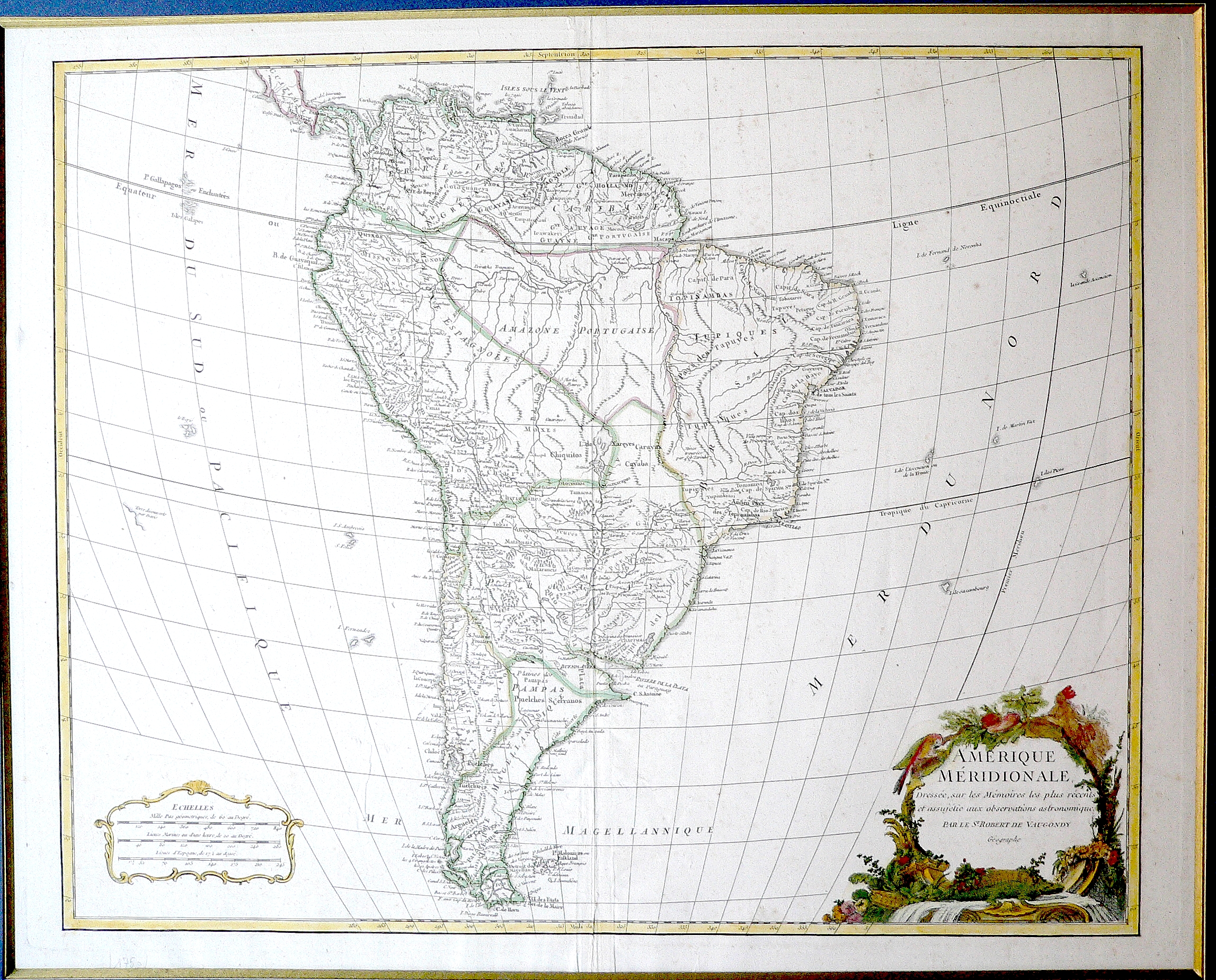
Map of South America. (1750) Geograph: Robert de Vaugondy.

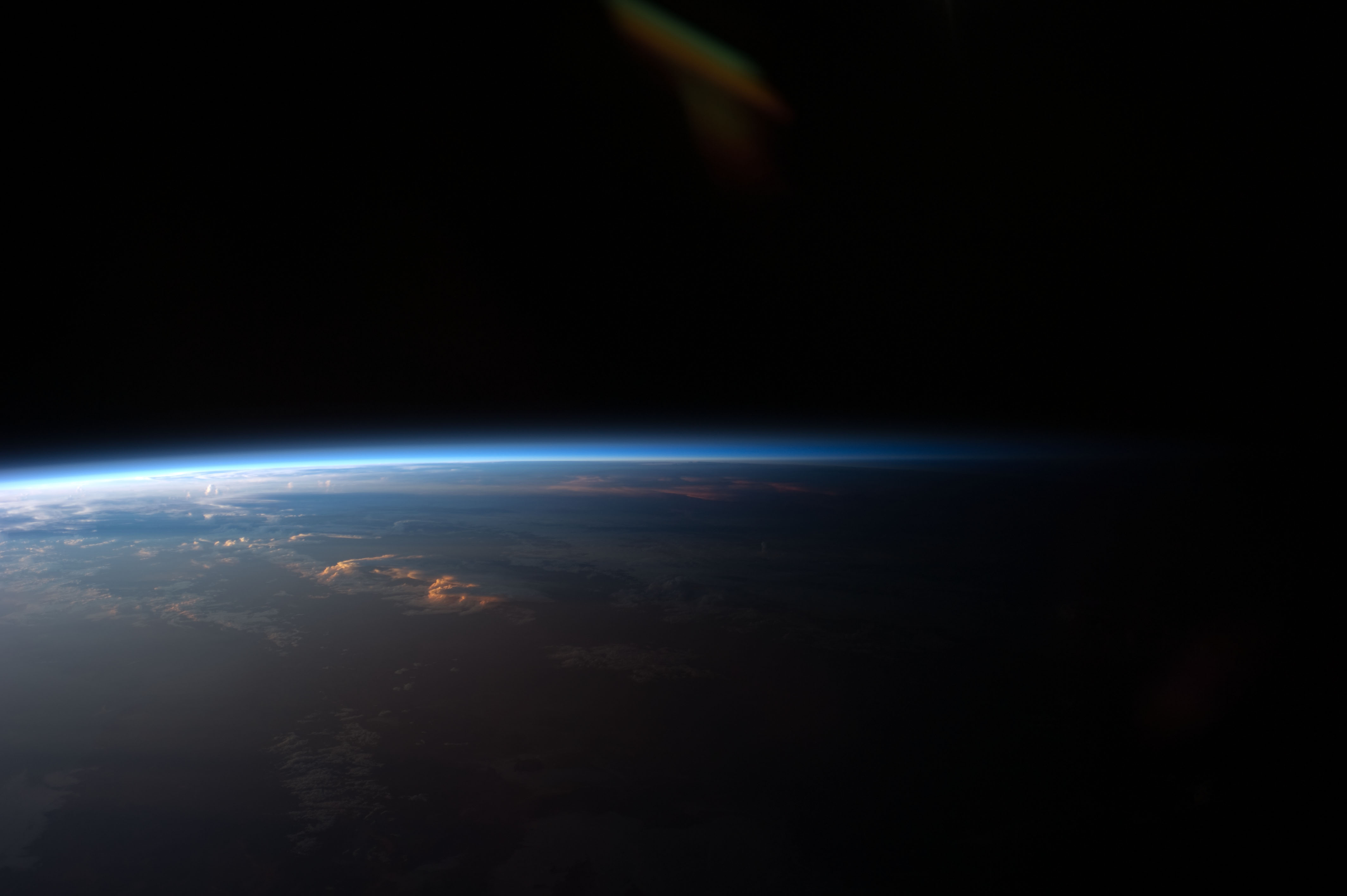
The terminator is visible in this panoramic view across central South America.

The geography of South America contains many diverse regions and climates. Geographically, South America is generally considered a continent forming the southern portion of the landmass of the Americas, south and east of the Colombia–Panama border by most authorities, or south and east of the Panama Canal by some. South and North America are sometimes considered a single continent or supercontinent, while constituent regions are infrequently considered subcontinents.

South America became attached to North America only recently (geologically speaking) with the formation of the Isthmus of Panama some 3 million years ago, which resulted in the Great American Interchange. The Andes, likewise a comparatively young and seismically restless mountain range, runs down the western edge of the continent; the land to the east of the northern Andes is largely tropical rainforest, the vast Amazon River basin. The continent also contains drier regions such as eastern Patagonia and the extremely arid Atacama Desert.

The South American continent also includes various islands, most of which belong to countries on the continent. The Caribbean territories are grouped with North America. The South American nations that border the Caribbean Sea — Colombia and Venezuela —are also known as the Caribbean South America.

== Topography and geology ==
The geographical structure of South America is deceptively simple for a continent-sized landmass. The continent's topography is often likened to a huge bowl owing to its flat interior almost ringed by tall mountains. With the exception of narrow coastal plains on the Pacific and Atlantic oceans, there are three main topographic features: the Andes, a central lowland, and the extensive Brazilian and Guiana Highlands in the east.

The Andes are a Cenozoic mountain range formed (and still forming) Altiplano and a number of major valleys such as the Rio Magdalena. These contain three of the world's highest capitals: Bogotá, Quito and highest of all, La Paz. The southernmost Andes hosts the Southern Patagonian Ice Field are lower and narrower. There are a number of large glaciers in the northern part, but from latitude 19°S to 28°S the climate is so arid that no permanent ice can form even on the highest peaks. Permafrost, however, is widespread in this section of the Altiplano and continuous above 5,600 metres (18,373 ft).

The very fertile soils from the erosion of the Andes formed the basis for the continent's only pre-Columbian state civilizations: those of the Inca Empire and its predecessors (Chavín, Nazca, Mochica, etc.). The area is still a major agricultural region. The Altiplano contains many rare minerals such as copper, tin, mercury ore. The Atacama is mined for its nitrates. Peru east of the Andes is regarded as the most important biodiversity hotspot in the world with its unique forests that form the western edge of the world's largest rainforest, the Amazon rainforest.

East of the Andes is a large lowland drained by a small number of rivers, including the two largest in the world by drainage area—the Amazon River and the more southerly Paraná River. The other major river of this central lowland is the Orinoco River, which has a natural channel linking it with the Amazon. Most of this central lowland is sparsely populated because the soils are heavily leached, but in the south is the very fertile pampas of Argentina—one of the world's major food-producing regions where wheat and beef cattle are pre-eminent. The natural vegetation of the northern lowlands are either savanna in the northern Llanos and southern campos, or tropical rainforest throughout most of the Amazon basin. Efforts to develop agriculture, outside of fertile floodplains of rivers descending from the Andes, have been largely failures because of the soils. Cattle have long been raised in the llanos of northern Colombia and Venezuela, but petroleum is now the dominant industry in the northern lowlands, making Venezuela the richest country in the continent.

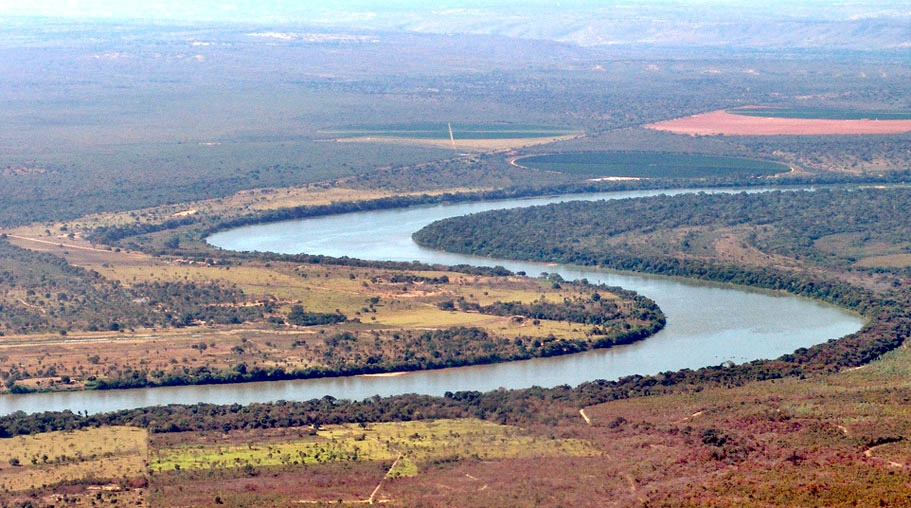
São Francisco River in Pernambuco, NE

The eastern highlands are areas of Earth's crust that are much older than the Andes, being pre-Cambrian in origin, but are still rugged in places, especially in the wet tepuis of Venezuela, Guyana and Roraima. The Amazon River has cut a large valley through a former highland, and to the east is a relatively low plateau comprising the Northeast and Southeast regions of Brazil. In the north of this region is the arid sertão, a poor region consistently affected by extremely erratic rainfall, and the humid Zona da Mata, once the home of the unique Atlantic Rainforest with many species not found in the Amazon, and now a center for sugarcane. Further south, the mainland use is coffee, while São Paulo is the economic heart of the continent with its industry.

South of about Santa Catarina, the highlands fade out to low plains in Uruguay.

East of the Andes in Argentina, there are a number of rugged, generally arid to semi-arid isolated mountain chains called Sierras Pampeanas, the highest of which is the Sierra de Córdoba near the city of the same name. Eastern Patagonia is characterized by containing a series of stepped plateaus of lava. South America and North America

== Territories ==
The largest country in South America by far, in both area and population, is Brazil. Regions in South America include the Andean States, the Guianas and the Southern Cone.

Name of territory, with flag	Area (km^{2})	Population (July 2021 est.)	Population density (per km^{2})	Capital
Argentina	2,766,890	45,864,941	16.6	Buenos Aires
Bolivia	1,098,580	11,758,869	10.7	La Paz, Sucre
Brazil	8,511,965	213,445,417	25.1	Brasília
Chile	756,950	18,307,925	24.2	Santiago
Colombia	1,138,910	50,355,650	44.2	Bogotá
Ecuador	283,560	17,093,159	60.3	Quito
Falkland Islands (UK)	12,173	3,198	0.26	Stanley
French Guiana (France)	83,534	283,539	3.4	Cayenne
Guyana	214,970	787,971	3.7	Georgetown
Paraguay	406,750	7,272,639	17.9	Asunción
Peru	1,285,220	32,201,224	25.1	Lima
(South Georgia and the South Sandwich Islands) South Georgia and South Sandwich Islands (UK)	3,903	0	0	Grytviken
Suriname	163,270	614,749	3.8	Paramaribo
Uruguay	176,220	3,398,239	19.3	Montevideo
Venezuela	912,050	29,069,153	31.9	Caracas

== Climate ==
South America Köppen climate map

As part of the Hadley model of atmospheric circulation, the equator is characterised by the ascending branches of separate meridional cells, driven by intense insolation. The vertical convection draws in air from the surrounding atmosphere, known as the trade winds. As these inward flows of air converge they reduce horizontal wind speed, and as they rise, they form precipitation. The vertical convection also results in a net export of heat and freshwater from the lower atmosphere into the troposphere This system is known as the ITCZ. The location of the ITCZ is centred on the areas of highest insolation, although it is more stationary over the oceans than landmasses.

In the Atlantic region, the ITCZ is clearly developed, and the spatial extent of the ITCZ reaches a minimum close to the equator during the boreal spring (March–May), while extending to a maximum of 10°–15°N in late boreal summer (August). No comprehensive theory for ITCZ formation and spatial variation has been validated, although several hypotheses have been proposed. Some studies advance ideas that describe one or more atmospheric cells over the equator, while others state that the position of the ITCZ depends on Ekman pumping efficiency and moisture availability. Whichever hypothesis best represents the natural system, it is clear that the dynamics of the ITCZ are influenced by several other external climate systems. These include continental convection and equatorially asymmetric sea surface temperature (SST) distribution. This asymmetry is evident in the northward bias of the ITCZ's location, which is maintained by a positive feedback between wind speed, evaporation and SST.

Whereas the ITCZ has a global extent, South America is subject to its own unique climate patterns. which have been organised into the South American monsoon system (SAMS). As an integrated component in the global climate system, the SAMS is influenced the Atlantic sector of the ITCZ, variability in the adjacent Pacific and Atlantic Oceans, the Andean and central-east Brazil topography, complex land surface processes and relations with land use change, and interactions involving topography and soil moisture. The SAMS framework comprises several distinct subcomponents, which are discussed below:

- The Pacific and Atlantic subtropical high: These are semi-permanent high pressure systems caused by descending sectors of the equatorial Hadley cells. The air masses are relatively warm and dry, and move in an anticyclonic circulation pattern over the sub-tropical oceans. The Pacific High is generally stable, whereas the Atlantic High moves throughout the year. During the summer, it covers most of the midlatitude and subtropical Atlantic Ocean. During winter, it is smaller and moves to the east.
- The Gran Chaco thermal low: A semi-permanent thermal-orographic depression located over the slope extending from Chaco to the Los Andes mountain range in the Argentine Northwest. It can be considered, together with the Bolivian High, as the regional response of the tropospheric circulation to the strong convective heating over the Amazon–central Brazil. The Andes effect reinforces the strength of the Chaco Low as an orographic barrier. It is present throughout the year, but is more intense during the summer, with a strong thermal component caused by the combination of high insolation and dry surface conditions. The resulting pressure gradient between the south Atlantic subtropical high and the Chaco low forces the easterly winds over the Amazon basin to turn southward, being channelled between the eastern slope of the Andes and the Brazilian Plateau.
- The South Atlantic Convergence Zone (SACZ): The SACZ controls rainfall in the southern subtropics and extends southeastward from the large continental convective zone of tropical South America. It is generated by moisture convergence between the South Atlantic high pressure zone and the continental thermal low pressure zone. The location of the SACZ is influenced by the topography in central-east Brazil Vera et al. (2006). The intensity of the SACZ is highest in austral summer, in phase with intensifying continental heating and convection. Weak SACZ is accompanied by enhanced rainfall over northern Argentina and southern Brazil. These positive rainfall anomalies are supported by a strong southward moisture flux at about 35°S–60°W that shifts eastward to about 40°W for the opposite phase of the seesaw, in accordance with an eastward displacement of the Atlantic high. An intensified SACZ is associated with enhanced streamflows to the north and diminished flows to the south. This north–south separation is probably related to the anomalously warm sea surface temperatures (SSTs) over the tropical and subtropical South Atlantic that strengthens the low-level meridional temperature gradient, intensifying the South Atlantic High and consequently the trade-winds.
- Polar outbreaks: Polar outbreaks occur when cold dense polar air masses pass beneath warmer tropical air masses, significantly cooling subtropical South America. They occur as a result of anticyclogenesis in the Pacific subtropical high, which is constrained at a low level by the southern extent of the Andes mountain range. This leads to the formation of a slow-moving long wave that creates mountain-parallel, ageostrophic flow, causing incursions of high-latitude cold air. They generate an important drop in temperature and increase in pressure, resulting in regional precipitation for southern South America. These surges occur mainly during the winter but their impact on the precipitation is even greater during summer.
- Low Level Jet (LLJ): LLJs originate in a low pressure area over the northern Andes and provide moisture for subtropical latitudes. During summer, they operate as localised wind maximum within the lower 1–2 km of the atmosphere, channelled by the Andes, terminating in southeastern South America. They are controlled by Amazonian wind patterns, which are influenced and controlled by patterns of insolation. They transport large amounts of moisture from the Amazon basin to the monsoonal anticyclone over Bolivia. A suppressed SACZ and increased convection in the sub-tropical plains is associated with a strengthening of the LLJ. These phases are linked to short-term extreme precipitation events in the plains of central Argentina. When the LLJ is weak, there is enhanced SACZ and suppressed convection to the south and extreme heat waves over the sub-tropical regions. It also generates turbulence through shear and participates actively as trigging mechanism for the formation of severe storm and Mesoscale Convective Systems over Paraguay, Northern Argentina and South of Brazil.
- Westerlies: South America experiences westerly winds in the middle latitudes, caused by the Coriolis force and associated geostrophic circulation patterns. They are more intense than their Northern Hemisphere counterparts due to the lack of continental landmass in the Southern Hemisphere. They reach their maximum speed in the troposphere, where they form jet streams. In particular, over the southern tip of South America and the adjacent south Pacific, the westerlies are strongest during austral summer, peaking between 45° and 55°S. During the austral winter, the jet stream moves into subtropical latitudes (its axis is at about 30°S) and the low-level westerlies expand equatorward but weaken, particularly at ~50°S. The pressure gradients between the polar low-pressure belt and the Pacific high-pressure cell, combined with these westerlies, results in permanent anticyclogenesis. Northward penetration of atmospheric perturbations from the westerlies is possible when the southeast Pacific anticyclone is weakened or moves equatorward, allowing penetration of westerly storm tracks to latitudes as far north as 31◦S. In the Andes, winter rains reach further north. During summer, the Pacific anticyclone shifts southward, impeding the northward migration of the westerlies.
- The Bolivian High: large anticyclonic circulation centred near 15°S, 65°W. It has been explained as the response of diabatic local heating in the Amazon region. The SACZ has a strong influence on the position and intensity of the Bolivian High
- The Madden–Julian oscillation (MJO): The MJO is characterized by an eastward progression of large regions of both enhanced and suppressed tropical rainfall, observed mainly over the Indian Ocean and Pacific Ocean. It is a source of intra-seasonal variability affecting South America that seems to be related to a combination of tropical circulation changes and midlatitude Rossby wave trains that propagate into South America.

The development of the SAMS during spring is characterised by a rapid southward shift of the convective region from northwestern South America to the highland region of the central Andes and to the southern Amazon basin. The South Atlantic High moves eastward, reflecting the pressure reduction over the continent and the intensity and direction of the zonal flow over the nearby tropics and sub-tropics. This change in flow direction is evident in changes to terrestrial windfields over extreme southwestern Amazonia, with winds changing from northerlies to northwesterlies, and over eastern Brazil, where the winds turn from easterlies to northeasterlies. The southward moisture flux east of the Andes also increases, bringing humidity to central and southeast Brazil.

As the SAMS progresses a continental-scale gyre transports moisture westward from the tropical Atlantic Ocean to the Amazon basin and then southward toward the extratropics of South America. The diabatic heating released in the SAMS region seems to promote that gyre, and the maintenance of the South Atlantic subtropical high during austral summer. It has also been suggested that is the subsidence over the cool SSTs of the eastern Pacific and extensive stratocumulus decks provide a radiative heat sink to the tropical atmosphere that can balance the adiabatic warming due to the monsoonal descent.

The decay phase of the monsoon begins between March and May, as convection shifts gradually northward toward the equator. During April and May, the low-level southward flow of moisture from the western Amazonia weakens, as more frequent incursions of drier and cooler air from the mid-latitudes begin to occur over the interior of subtropical South America.

== See also ==
- Brazil–Malvinas Confluence
- Guiana Highlands
- List of rivers of the Americas by coastline
- Tepui
