= List of extreme points of U.S. states and territories =

Extreme points are portions of a region which are further north, south, east, or west than any other. This is a list of extreme points in U.S. states, territories, and the District of Columbia.

Although many borders were initially defined by treaty or other agreement to be along a specific line of latitude or longitude, inaccuracies with surveying equipment/techniques caused the surveyed lines to deviate slightly from the true boundaries. Even as equipment/techniques improved, the initial surveyed line still remains the official border, which is why the extreme points may be either side of the agreed-upon line.

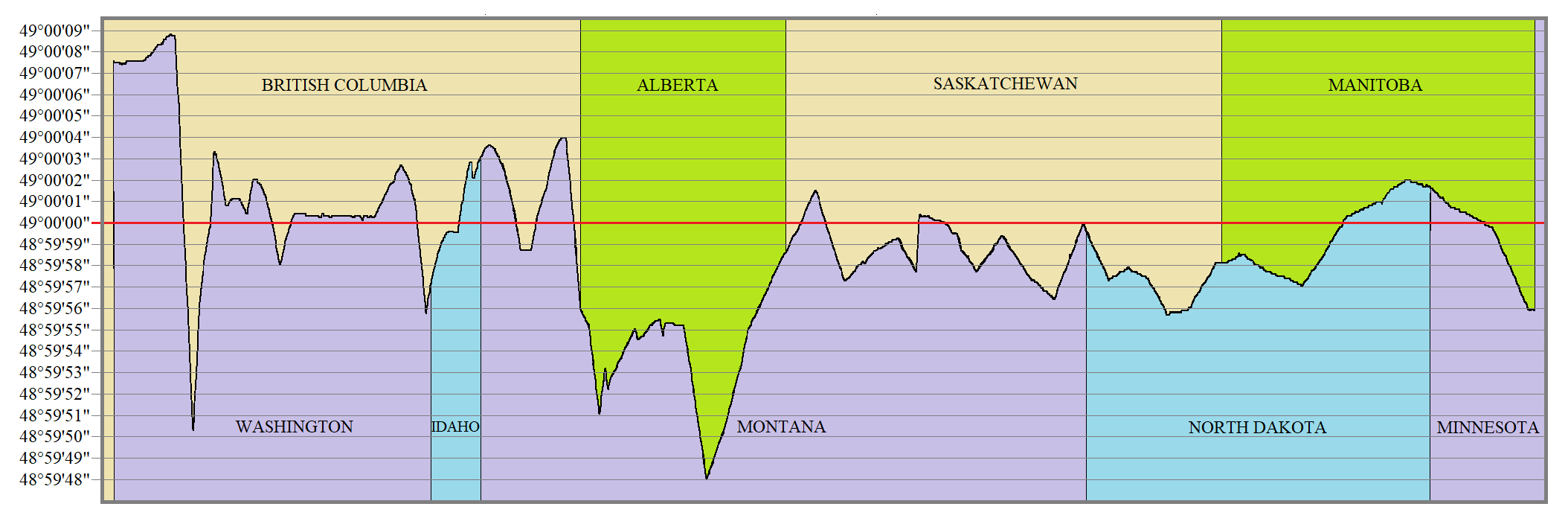
The 49th parallel was agreed to be the border between the United States and British North America (later Canada) from Lake of the Woods to the Strait of Juan de Fuca in the Treaty of 1818 and Oregon Treaty. However, the true boundary line as surveyed deviates several seconds from the true parallel, as seen in this significantly exaggerated depiction

State / Territory	Northernmost point	Southernmost point	Easternmost point	Westernmost point
Alabama	Water: 35°00′29″N 88°12′11″W; Tennessee border at the northwest corner of the state in Pickwick Lake northwest of Waterloo Land: 35°00′28″N 88°11′35″W; Tennessee border on an unnamed island in Pickwick Lake	30°11′15″N 88°03′02″W; Sand Island (on which Sand Island Light sits)	32°15′35″N 84°53′21″W (Note: This extreme point is on a body of water, but the extreme point on land is not listed as it is less than half a minute away); Georgia border on the Chattahoochee River southeast of Fort Mitchell	31°53′38″N 88°28′25″W; Mississippi border southwest of Melvin
Alaska (Note: Alaska uniquely straddles the 180 degree east-west meridian, which results in two different definitions of Easternmost and Westernmost points.)	71°23′13″N 156°28′29″W (Note: Also the extreme point in all 50 states) (Note: Also the extreme point of the US); Point Barrow northeast of Utqiaġvik	51°12′36″N 179°07′55″W; Unnamed archipelago south of Amatignak Island in the Aleutian Islands	By direction, water: 55°16′55″N 129°58′27″W; British Columbia border on the Portland Canal east of Ketchikan By direction, land: 55°17′24″N 129°59′40″W; Camp Point, in the Misty Fjords National Monument Wilderness, east of Ketchikan By longitude: 51°57′15″N 179°46′42″E; Pochnoi Point on Semisopochnoi Island in the Aleutian Islands	By direction: 52°55′20″N 172°26′35″E; Peaked Island in the Aleutian Islands, west of Attu Island in the Aleutian Islands By longitude: 51°16′15″N 179°08′51″W; Amatignak Island in the Aleutian Islands
American Samoa	11°02′46″S 171°04′26″W; Swains Island (Note: Swains Island is disputed with Tokelau) Excluding disputed islands: 14°09′18″S 169°36′45″W; Faumasili Point, Olosega Island	14°33′34″S 168°09′30″W; Rose Atoll	14°32′50″S 168°08′36″W; Rose Atoll	11°03′11″S 171°05′24″W; Swains Island Excluding disputed islands: 14°19′15″S 170°50′49″W; Luania Rocks, off Tutuila Island
Arizona	37°00′13″N 110°29′25″W; Utah border west of Oljato-Monument Valley	31°19′56.5″N 111°04′30″W; Sonora border west of Nogales	36°59′56″N 109°02′43″W; AZ-CO-NM-UT quadripoint	32°30′28″N 114°48′59″W; Baja California border northwest of San Luis
Arkansas	36°29′59″N 94°21′18″W; Missouri border northwest of Bella Vista	33°00′15″N 91°09′58″W; AR-MS-LA tripoint	Water: 35°54′25″N 89°38′28″W; Tennessee border on the Mississippi River east of Armorel Land: 35°53′56″N 89°38′49″W; Barfield Bar, an island in the Mississippi River east of Armorel	36°29′58″N 94°37′04″W; AR-MO-OK tripoint
California	42°00′34″N 122°22′41″W; Oregon border northeast of Hornbrook	32°32′04″N 117°07′26″W; Baja California border where it meets the Pacific Ocean in Border Field State Park	34°15′46″N 114°07′52″W; Arizona border on the Colorado River southeast of Parker Dam	40°26′19″N 124°24′55″W; Sugar Loaf Island
Colorado	41°00′12″N 107°00′02″W; Wyoming border north of Hahns Peak Village	36°59′33″N 106°52′11″W; Southern border with New Mexico south of Chromo	37°22′30″N 102°02′30″W; Kansas border east of Walsh	38°16′31″N 109°03′38″W; Utah border southwest of Paradox
Connecticut	42°03′02″N 73°25′57″W; Massachusetts border north of Salisbury	Water: 40°57′03″N 73°36′46″W; New York border in Long Island Sound south of Greenwich Land: 40°58′51″N 73°37′47″W; Great Captain Island	41°39′22″N 71°47′14″W; Rhode Island border southeast of Sterling	41°06′02″N 73°43′40″W; New York border northwest of Greenwich
Delaware	39°50′22″N 75°33′37″W; Pennsylvania border east of Beaver Valley	38°27′04″N 75°08′23″W; Maryland border south of Williamsville	38°27′42″N 75°02′56″W; On Fenwick Island	39°39′44″N 75°47′20″W; Maryland border southwest of Newark
District of Columbia	38°59′44″N 77°02′28″W; Near the intersection of E Beach Dr NW and Verbena St NW	Water: 38°47′30″N 77°02′21″W; DC-MD-VA tripoint on the Potomac River Land: 38°48′12″N 77°01′27″W; Western end of Oxon Hill Farm	38°53′34″N 76°54′34″W; Intersection of Eastern Avenue NE and Southern Avenue NE	38°56′04″N 77°07′11″W; DC-MD-VA tripoint on the Potomac River at Little Falls
Florida	31°00′04″N 85°09′52″W; Alabama border north of Malone	24°31′16″N 81°57′49″W (Note: Also the extreme point in the 48 contiguous states); Ballast Key in the Mule Keys	26°46′43″N 80°01′52″W; Palm Beach Shores	30°51′59″N 87°38′06″W; Alabama border on the Perdido River west of Walnut Hill
(Georgia (U.S. state)) Georgia	35°00′05″N 83°06′38″W; North Carolina border near GA-NC-SC tripoint	30°21′22″N 82°03′56″W; Florida border on the St. Marys River south of St. George	32°00′43″N 80°50′27″W; Tybee Island	34°59′05″N 85°36′19″W; AL-GA-TN tripoint
Guam	13°39′16″N 144°51′36″E; Ritidian Point	13°14′03″N 144°38′40″E; Cocos Island	13°35′51″N 144°57′24″E; Pati point	13°26′45″N 144°37′06″E; Point Udall
Hawaii	28°27′20″N 178°19′20″W; Kure Atoll	18°54′40″N 155°40′52″W; Ka Lae, Big Island	19°31′00″N 154°48′30″W; Cape Kumukahi, Big Island	28°25′05″N 178°22′28″W; Kure Atoll
Idaho	49°00′03″N 116°02′57″W; BC-ID-MT tripoint	41°59′17″N 113°52′24″W; Utah border south of Oakley	42°44′51″N 111°02′37″W; Wyoming border northeast of Soda Springs	44°23′28″N 117°14′35″W; Oregon border on the Snake River northwest of Weiser
Illinois	42°30′31″N 90°38′34″W; IL-IA-WI tripoint on Mississippi River	36°58′14″N 89°10′15″W; Missouri border on the Mississippi River off of Angelo Towhead, an island south of Cairo	Water: 42°29′36″N 87°01′12″W; IL-MI-WI tripoint in Lake Michigan Land: 38°46′54″N 87°29′46″W; Indiana border southeast of Russellville	40°10′45″N 91°30′47″W; Missouri border on the Mississippi River west of Lima
Indiana	Water: 41°45′41″N 87°07′30″W; Michigan border in Lake Michigan north of Burns Harbor Land: 41°45′39″N 86°06′30″W; Michigan border north of Granger	37°46′18″N 87°57′10″W; Kentucky border on the Ohio River near the IL-IN-KY border	38°52′32″N 84°47′05″W; Kentucky border on the Ohio River northeast of Patriot	37°54′06″N 88°05′52″W; Illinois border on the Wabash River west of Mt. Vernon
Iowa	43°30′04″N 95°14′41″W; Minnesota border northeast of Lake Park	40°22′32″N 91°27′16″W; Missouri border southwest of Keokuk	Water: 42°00′12″N 90°08′25″W; Illinois border on the Mississippi River east of Andover Land: 41°59′39″N 90°08′33″W; Unnamed island in the Mississippi River east of Andover	42°44′13″N 96°38′22″W; South Dakota border on the Big Sioux River southwest of Westfield
Kansas	40°00′11″N 102°01′17″W; Nebraska border near the CO-KS-NE tripoint	36°59′35″N 102°02′32″W; CO-KS-OK tripoint	39°08′56″N 94°35′18″W; Missouri border on the Missouri River within Kansas City	40°00′00″N 102°03′06″W; Colorado border near the CO-KS-NE tripoint
Kentucky	39°08′52″N 84°44′57″W; Ohio border on the Ohio River north of Francisville	36°29′50″N 88°03′12″W; Tennessee border in Kentucky Lake southeast of New Concord	37°32′33″N 81°57′54″W; West Virginia border on the shore of the Tug Fork River near the KY-VA-WV tripoint	36°33′15″N 89°34′17″W; Missouri border on the Mississippi River at the Madrid Bar in the Kentucky Bend
Louisiana	33°01′11″N 93°55′17″W; Arkansas border northwest of Ida	28°55′44″N 89°25′11″W; Unnamed island between Southwest Pass (a distributary of the Mississippi River) and West Bay, southwest of Port Eads	29°54′33″N 88°48′59″W; Chandeleur Islands	32°48′30″N 94°02′36″W; Texas border southwest of Vivian
Maine	47°27′35″N 69°13′28″W; Quebec border on the St. Francis River at Estcourt Station	42°58′29″N 70°35′57″W; Cedar Island Ledge, in the Isles of Shoals	44°48′44″N 66°56′43″W; Sail Rock, off of West Quoddy Head	45°18′20″N 71°05′02″W; ME-NH-QC tripoint
Maryland	39°43′23″N 78°43′33″W; Pennsylvania border northeast of Bowmans Addition	Water: 37°53′12″N 76°14′11″W; Virginia border in Chesapeake Bay southeast of Scotland Land: 37°54′44″N 75°53′01″W; Watkins Point, southwest of Crisfield	38°27′05″N 75°02′57″W; Delaware border, where it meets the Atlantic Ocean	39°16′48″N 79°29′16″W; West Virginia border southwest of Crellin
Massachusetts	42°53′12″N 70°54′19″W; New Hampshire border in Salisbury	41°14′21″N 70°00′39″W; Nantucket Island	41°44′28″N 69°55′44″W; Cape Cod National Seashore in Orleans	42°05′10″N 73°30′30″W; New York border west of Mount Washington
Michigan	Water: 48°18′20″N 88°22′07″W; Ontario border in Lake Superior north of Passage Island Land: 48°15′46″N 88°15′46″W; Gull Islands	41°41′46″N 84°48′22″W; IN-MI-OH tripoint	Water: 43°35′28″N 82°07′22″W; Ontario border in Lake Huron northeast of Point Sanilac Land: 42°58′29″N 82°25′06″W; Shore of the St. Clair River in Port Huron	46°33′58″N 90°25′07″W; Wisconsin border on the Montreal River where it meets Lake Superior
Minnesota	49°23′04″N 95°09′12″W; MB-MN-ON tripoint in Lake of the Woods	43°29′57″N 93°15′28″W; Iowa border south of Glenville	Water: 48°00′47″N 89°29′02″W; MI-MN-ON tripoint in Lake Superior Land: 48°00′20″N 89°29′31″W; Pigeon Point	48°58′08″N 97°14′21″W; North Dakota border on the Red River of the North in St. Vincent
Mississippi	34°59′45″N 88°53′41″W; Tennessee border north of Walnut	30°10′27″N 89°27′48″W; Lighthouse Point, southeast of Ansley	34°53′32″N 88°05′53″W; Alabama border on the Tennessee River northeast of Eastport	31°15′06″N 91°39′19″W; Louisiana border on the Mississippi River northwest of Fort Adams
Missouri	40°36′49″N 91°43′45″W; Iowa border on the Des Moines River northeast of Anson	35°59′45″N 90°22′40″W; Arkansas border southwest of Cardwell	36°57′33″N 89°05′57″W; Kentucky border on the Mississippi River northeast of Wyatt	40°34′25″N 95°46′29″W; Nebraska border on the Missouri River near the IA-MO-NE tripoint
Montana	49°00′04″N 114°23′19″W; British Columbia border northeast of Eureka in Glacier National Park	44°21′29″N 112°50′44″W; Idaho border at a sister of Italian Peak southwest of Lima	44°59′53″N 104°02′23″W; South Dakota border near the MT-SD-WY tripoint	48°00′00″N 116°02′57″W; Idaho border southwest of Heron
Nebraska	43°00′06″N 103°58′00″W; South Dakota border near the NE-SD-WY tripoint	39°59′59.8″N 95°21′41″W; Kansas border southeast of Rulo	40°00′00″N 95°18′30″W; MO-KS-NE tripoint on the Missouri River	41°09′26″N 104°03′13″W; Wyoming border southwest of Bushnell
Nevada	42°00′07″N 114°49′25″W; Idaho border northwest of Jackpot	35°00′07″N 114°38′01″W; AZ-CA-NV tripoint on the Colorado River	41°43′08″N 114°02′22″W; Utah border northeast of Montello	39°16′22″N 120°00′23″W; California border northwest of Incline Village
New Hampshire	45°18′21″N 71°05′09″W; Quebec border near the ME-NH-QC tripoint	42°41′49″N 71°17′40″W; Massachusetts border southeast of Pelham	42°57′44″N 70°36′10″W; Anderson Ledge, in the Isles of Shoals	42°51′13″N 72°33′26″W; Vermont border on the Connecticut River northwest of Hinsdale
New Jersey	41°21′27″N 74°41′44″W; NJ-NY-PA tripoint on the Delaware River in Montague Township, Sussex County	38°55′43″N 74°56′03″W; Broadway Beach in Cape May, Cape May County	Water: 40°59′50″N 73°53′37″W; New York border on the Hudson River in Alpine, Bergen County Land: 40°59′50″N 73°54′09″W; Station Rock, The Palisades in Alpine, Bergen County	39°37′31″N 75°33′35″W; Delaware border in the former Killcohook National Wildlife Refuge in Pennsville Township, Salem County
New Mexico	37°00′01″N 103°00′08″W; CO-NM-OK tripoint	31°19′55.8″N 108°45′23″W; Sonora border near the Chihuahua-New Mexico-Sonora tripoint	36°43′15″N 103°00′07″W; Oklahoma border northeast of Seneca	31°19′56″N 109°03′00″W; AZ-NM-Sonora tripoint
New York	45°00′57″N 74°49′36″W; Ontario border on the St. Lawrence River north of Robert Moses State Park - Thousand Islands	40°29′46″N 74°14′51″W; Ward's Point, Staten Island	41°04′16″N 71°51′22″W; Montauk Point, Camp Hero State Park	Water: 42°30′00″N 79°45′45″W; Pennsylvania border in Lake Erie west of Dunkirk Land: 42°08′22″N 79°45′43″W; Pennsylvania border west of Mina
North Carolina	36°35′17″N 81°40′39″W; NC-TN-VA tripoint	33°50′35″N 77°57′38″W; Cape Fear, Bald Head Island	35°35′04″N 75°27′36″W; Rodanthe Beach, Rodanthe	34°59′18″N 84°19′19″W; GA-NC-TN tripoint
North Dakota	49°00′02″N 97°40′50″W; Manitoba border northwest of Neche	45°56′07″N 96°33′49″W; MN-ND-SD tripoint	46°05′02″N 96°33′16″W; Minnesota border on the Bois de Sioux River northeast of Fairmount	48°56′01″N 104°02′56″W; Montana border west of Fortuna
Northern Mariana Islands	20°33′12″N 144°53′37″E; Farallon de Pajaros	14°06′37″N 145°10′23″E; Puntan Pona, Rota	16°01′30″N 146°03′53″E; Farallon de Medinilla	20°32′25″N 144°53′11″E; Farallon de Pajaros
Ohio	Water: 42°19′24″N 80°31′11″W; OH-PA-ON tripoint in Lake Erie Land: 41°58′38″N 80°31′10″W; Pennsylvania border where it meets Lake Erie	38°24′12″N 82°33′04″W; West Virginia border on the shore of the Ohio River in Burlington	41°14′59″N 80°31′07″W; Pennsylvania border north of West Hill	39°09′22″N 84°49′13″W; Indiana border west of Elizabethtown
Oklahoma	37°00′08″N 100°11′41″W; Kansas border north of Knowles	33°36′57″N 94°31′31″W; Gunn Lake, on the Texas border near the AR-OK-TX tripoint	35°23′37″N 94°25′52″W; Arkansas border on the Arkansas River east of Moffett	36°40′32″N 103°00′09″W; New Mexico border southwest of Wheeless
Oregon	46°17′57″N 124°01′30″W; Washington border on the Columbia River north of Sand Island	41°59′32″N 118°42′27″W; Nevada border south of Fields	45°36′40″N 116°27′48″W; Idaho border on the Snake River east of Imnaha	42°48′08″N 124°36′47″W; Northwest Rock, southwest of Cape Blanco
Pennsylvania	Water: 42°30′51″N 79°45′45″W; NY-ON-PA tripoint, in Lake Erie Land: 42°16′10″N 79°45′43″W; New York border where it meets Lake Erie	39°43′11″N 76°59′28″W; Maryland border south of Hanover	41°21′45″N 74°41′22″W; New York border on the Delaware River in Matamoras	Water: 42°19′24″N 80°31′11″W; OH-ON-PA tripoint in Lake Erie Land: 39°44′39″N 80°31′10″W; West Virginia border west of New Freeport
Puerto Rico	18°30′58″N 67°05′28″W; Shacks Beach northwest of Jobos	17°52′53″N 66°32′01″W; Isla Morillito	18°18′44″N 65°13′16″W; Punta del Este, Isla Culebrita	18°09′31″N 67°57′06″W; Isla Monito
Rhode Island	42°01′08″N 71°22′53″W; Massachusetts border northeast of Cumberland	41°08′48″N 71°35′35″W; Black Rock Point, Block Island	41°29′51″N 71°07′14″W; Massachusetts border where it meets Rhode Island Sound	Water: 41°18′16″N 71°54′26″W; CT-NY-RI tripoint in Block Island Sound Land: 41°19′44″N 71°53′33″W; Connecticut border on Sandy Point Island
South Carolina	35°12′56″N 82°23′24″W; North Carolina border north of Tigerville	32°02′08″N 80°53′32″W; Georgia border on the Savannah River southwest of Hilton Head Island	33°51′03″N 78°32′27″W; North Carolina border where it meets the Atlantic Ocean on Bird Island	34°41′57″N 83°21′14″W; Georgia border in Lake Yonah southwest of Long Creek
South Dakota	45°56′43″N 103°34′25″W; North Dakota border northwest of Ludlow	42°28′47″N 96°28′47″W; Nebraska border on the Missouri River south of Dakota Dunes	43°07′13″N 96°26′11″W; Iowa border on the Big Sioux River southeast of Hudson	44°59′51″N 104°03′28″W; MT-SD-WY tripoint
Tennessee	Water: 36°40′42″N 88°04′14″W; Kentucky border in Kentucky Lake northwest of Dover Land: 36°40′41″N 88°03′31″W; Land Between the Lakes National Recreation Area, northwest of Dover	34°58′59″N 85°24′44″W; Georgia border west of Lookout Mountain	36°36′43″N 81°38′49″W; Virginia border northeast of the NC-TN-VA tripoint	35°00′16″N 90°18′38″W; Arkansas border southwest of Memphis (west of the Mississippi River)
Texas	36°30′02″N 103°00′08″W; NM-OK-TX tripoint	25°50′14″N 97°23′39″W; Tamaulipas border on the Rio Grande River south of South Point	31°01′54″N 93°30′29″W; Louisiana border on the coast of the Sabine River northeast of Burkeville	31°53′44″N 106°38′44″W; New Mexico border west of Prado Verde
United States Minor Outlying Islands	28°13′06″N 177°22′17″W; Sand Island, Midway Atoll	00°22′50″S 160°00′18″W; Jarvis Island	18°23′50″N 75°00′07″W; Navassa Island (Note: Navassa Island is disputed with Haiti) Excluding disputed islands: (Note: In addition to Navassa Island, Bajo Nuevo Bank and Serranilla Bank, which would be the next most-eastwardly, are also disputed); 0°22′32″S 159°59′05″W; Jarvis Island	19°18′01″N 166°35′56″E; Wilkes Island, Wake Island (Note: Wake Island is disputed with the Marshall Islands) Excluding disputed islands: 28°11′49″N 177°23′51″W; Sand Island, Midway Atoll
Utah	42°00′06″N 111°02′48″W; ID-UT-WY tripoint	36°59′52″N 110°28′11″W; Arizona border west of Oljato-Monument Valley	38°09′25″N 109°02′33″W; Utah border southeast of La Sal	37°33′32″N 114°03′10″W; Nevada border west of Enterprise
Vermont	45°01′00″N 72°50′49″W; Quebec border northwest of Berkshire	42°43′37″N 72°27′30″W; MA-NH-VT tripoint on the shore of the Connecticut River	45°00′49″N 71°27′54″W; New Hampshire border on the Connecticut River east of Beecher Falls	Water: 44°02′42″N 73°26′17″W; New York border in Lake Champlain northwest of Bridport Land: 44°02′50″N 73°25′27″W; Crane Point on Lake Champlain, northwest of Bridport
(United States Virgin Islands) Virgin Islands (U.S.)	18°24′54″N 64°54′32″W; Pelican Cay off the north coast of Little Hans Lollik Island	17°40′25″N 64°54′02″W; Southwest Point, Saint Croix	17°45′19″N 64°33′55″W; Point Udall, St. Croix	18°20′05″N 65°05′09″W; Tip Rock, off of Savana Island
Virginia	39°27′58″N 78°20′50″W; West Virginia border northwest of Reynolds Store	36°32′27″N 79°32′18″W; North Carolina border southwest of Danville	38°01′37″N 75°14′32″W; Maryland border where it meets the Atlantic Ocean on Assateague Island	36°36′03″N 83°40′31″W; KY-TN-VA tripoint, in Cumberland Gap National Historical Park
Washington	49°00′09″N 122°12′02″W; British Columbia east of Sumas	45°32′37″N 122°17′42″W; Oregon border on the Columbia River south of Reed Island State Park	45°59′43″N 116°54′58″W; ID-OR-WA tripoint on the Snake River	48°10′42″N 124°46′18″W; Bodelteh Islands, northwest of Beaver
West Virginia	40°38′20″N 80°31′08″W; OH-PA-WV tripoint on the Ohio River	37°12′06″N 81°40′42″W; Virginia border south of Berwind	39°19′17″N 77°43′10″W; MD-VA-WV tripoint	38°09′57″N 82°38′41″W; Kentucky border on the Tug Fork River northwest of Fort Gay
Wisconsin	Water: 47°18′35″N 90°39′17″W; Minnesota border north of the Apostle Islands in Lake Superior Land: 47°04′51″N 90°43′46″W; Devils Island, Apostle Islands	42°29′31″N 88°46′36″W; Illinois border west of Sharon	Water: 45°14′10″N 86°14′58″W; Michigan border in Lake Michigan east of Newport State Park Land: 45°23′40″N 86°45′50″W; Fish Island	45°38′28″N 92°53′22″W; Minnesota border on the St. Croix River south of Benson
Wyoming	45°00′21″N 109°06′12″W; Montana border northwest of Ralston	40°59′41″N 110°24′41″W; Utah border west of Lonetree	41°23′53″N 104°03′08″W; Nebraska border southeast of Albin	45°00′03″N 111°03′16″W; Montana border at the northwest corner of the state in Yellowstone National Park

== See also ==
- Extreme points of the United States
- Extreme points of Canadian provinces
- List of U.S. states by elevation
- Geographic centers of the United States
