= Extreme points of Colombia =

This is a list of the extreme points of Colombia, the points that are farther north, south, east or west than any other location.

== Latitude and longitude ==
Geographic coordinates expressed in WGS 84.

=== Colombia ===
- Northernmost point: Bajo Nuevo keys in San Andrés y Providencia Department (15°53′03″N 81°22′14″W)
- Southernmost point: stream in Amazonas River, Leticia, in Amazonas Department (4°13′37″S 69°56′50″W)
- Westernmost point: San Andrés Island in San Andrés y Providencia Department (12°31′51″N 81°44′08″W)
- Easternmost point: San José Island in Rio Negro, in front of the Cocuy monolith in Guainía Department (1°13′48″N 66°51′01″W)

=== Colombia (mainland) ===
- Northernmost point: Punta Gallinas in Guajira Department (12°27′30″N 71°39′52″W)
- Southernmost point: Amazonas River, Leticia, in Amazonas Department (4°13′37″S 69°56′50″W)
- Westernmost point: Cabo Manglares in Nariño Department (1°39′02″N 79°00′29″W)
- Easternmost point: San José Island in Rio Negro, in front of the Cocuy monolith in Guainía Department (1°13′48″N 66°51′01″W)

== Altitude ==
Height refers to mean sea level.

- Highest point: Pico Cristóbal Colón in Magdalena Department, 5,730 m (10°50′11.6″N 73°41′12.3″W)
- Lowest point: Pacific Ocean, 0 m

The Columbia Gazetteer of the World (2008) gives Pico Cristóbal Colón's height as 5,776 m, but the CIA World Factbook (2024) gives the height as 5,730 m.
