= Extreme communities of Canada =

Canadian communities at extreme points

This is a list of the extreme communities in Canada and its provinces and territories. They are farther east, north, south or west than any other community, though they are generally not farther than the extreme points of Canadian provinces. The record latitude (in degrees north) or longitude (in degrees west) is given.

Area	North	Latitude	West	Longitude	South	Latitude	East	Longitude
Canada	Alert, Nunavut	82°28′	Beaver Creek, Yukon	140°52′46″	Pelee, Ontario	41°46' 0.12"	St. John's, Newfoundland and Labrador	52°39′26″
British Columbia	Lower Post	59°55'	Pleasant Camp	136°27'	East Sooke	48°21'	Corbin	114°29'
Alberta	Indian Cabins	59°52'	Cherry Point	119°57'	Coutts	49°00′23″	Lloydminster*	110°00′
Saskatchewan	Waterloo Lake	59°38'	Lloydminster*	110°00′	West Poplar	49°00'08"	Fertile	101°27′02"
Manitoba	Nunalla	59°55'	Flin Flon**	101°51′	Emerson	49°00'43"	Shamattawa	92°05'
Ontario	Fort Severn	56°00′37″	Ingolf	95°07'	Pelee, Ontario	41°46' 0.12"	Curry Hill	74°23'
Quebec	Ivujivik	62°25′0″	Pointe-Piché	79°31'	Elgin or Hinchinbrooke***	44°59′30″	Blanc-Sablon	57°07'
New Brunswick	Dalhousie	48°03'	Connors	68°49'	White Head	44°37'	Cape Tormentine	63°47'
Prince Edward Island	Seacow Pond	47°01'	West Cape	64°24'	High Bank	45°58'	East Point	61°58′
Nova Scotia	St. Paul Island (uninhabited)	47°12′10″	Westport	66°21′06″	The Hawk	43°23′30″	Main-à-Dieu	59°51′
Newfoundland and Labrador	Nain	56°33′02″	Labrador City	66°55′13″	St. Shott's	46°37′41″	Blackhead, St. John's	52°39′26″
Yukon	Old Crow, Yukon Pauline Cove (last permanent residents left in 1987)	67°57′ (Old Crow)	Beaver Creek	140°53'	Contact Creek	60°00'	Contact Creek	127°43'
Northwest Territories	Sachs Harbour	71°59′	Aklavik	135°0′	Fort Smith	60°00′	Łutselk'e	110°44′
Nunavut	Alert	82°27′	Kugluktuk	115°09′0″	Sanikiluaq	56°32′	Qikiqtarjuaq	64°02′

*Lloydminster lies on the Alberta/Saskatchewan border. Farthest east entirely within Alberta is Empress (110°0′22″W). Farthest west entirely within Saskatchewan is Govenlock in the southwest part of the province.
**Flin Flon lies on the Saskatchewan / Manitoba border, however, the southeastern part of Saskatchewan is located much further to the east than Flin Flon.
***The Canada-US border bends below 45°N in the region; the very southernmost point is where the Châteauguay River crosses the border.

== See also ==
- Extreme points of Canadian provinces
- Nordicity
- Remote and isolated community
