= Extreme points of Canadian provinces and territories =

This is a table of extreme points (north, south, east and west) of each of the provinces and territories of Canada. Many of these points are uninhabited; see also extreme communities of Canada for inhabited places.

Province/territory	Northernmost point	Southernmost point	Easternmost point	Westernmost point
Alberta	Northwest Territories border (60th parallel)	Montana border south of Writing-on-Stone Provincial Park	Saskatchewan border (110 W)	British Columbia border, from Willmore Wilderness Park north to the border with the Northwest Territories (120 W)
British Columbia	Yukon and Northwest Territories border (60th parallel)	Race Rocks (Lat. 48°17′52.9″ N, also southernmost point in Western Canada)	Akamina Pass (Long. 114°3′13″ W)	BC-YT-AK tripoint within Tatshenshini-Alsek Provincial Park
Manitoba	Nunavut border (60th parallel)	Water: Minnesota border in Lake of the Woods Land: Minnesota border at Buffalo Point	Point where Manitoba's eastern border meets Hudson Bay (legally defined as where the shore intersects with 89th meridian west, near Milk Creek and the mouth of the Black Duck River)	Saskatchewan border, north of the Churchill River
New Brunswick	Point of land near Dalhousie	Machias Seal Island Excluding disputed islands: Southern tip of the largest island of "Three Islands" off the coast of Grand Manan	Cape Tormentine	Maine border near NB-QC-ME tripoint
Newfoundland and Labrador	Cape Chidley, Labrador; 60°23′37″N 64°25′30″W	Cape Freels, Newfoundland; 46°36′40″N 53°33′34″W	Cape Spear, Easternmost point of land in Canada; 47°31′24″N 52°37′11″W	Quebec border approximately 50 miles (80 km) west of Esker; 54°01′32″N 67°49′10″W
Northwest Territories	Western tip of an island that is approximately 200 km (124 mi) SW of the north magnetic pole	British Columbia, Alberta, and Saskatchewan border, along the 60th parallel	Nunavut border (From the 60th parallel to the centre of Thelon Wildlife Sanctuary)	Yukon border (the "straight" part near Aklavik)
Nova Scotia	Saint Paul Island; 47°12′10″N 60°09′03″W	Mother Owens Rocks (South of Seal Island	Cormorandière Rocks (near Scatarie Island)	Brier Island
Nunavut	Cape Columbia, Ellesmere Island, near Alert. Northernmost point of land in Canada. (The northernmost water/ice point is the North Pole)	Stag Island's southern point 51°39′01″N 79°04′28″W	Easternmost point of Ellesmere Island, 27km south east of Alert, 82°19'06.9"N 61°06'01.1"W	Point where Nunavut's western border with Northwest Territories and Amundsen Gulf meet, approx. 30 miles (50 km) north of Tuktut Nogait National Park
Ontario	Point just east of where Ontario's western border meets Hudson Bay, approx. 125 kilometres (78 mi) NW of Fort Severn; 56°51′25″N 88°53′05″W	Middle Island, Lake Erie. Southernmost point of land in Canada, and part of Point Pelee National Park	Land: Shore of the St. Lawrence River NE of Wood Creek, near Curry Hill. Water: In the St. Lawrence River offshore from the previous point	Manitoba border Longitude: 95°09'11" West
Prince Edward Island	North Cape	Wood Islands	East Point	West Cape
Quebec	Cape Wolstenholme, approx. 17 miles (27 km) NE of Ivujivik; 62°34′55″N 77°30′30″W	New York border, where the Châteauguay River crosses the border (Latitude: 44°59'30"N approx.)	Labrador border, near Blanc-Sablon; Longitude: 57°06'30" West	Pointe Louis-XIV, approx. 60 miles (97 km) NNW of Chisasibi; 54°37′27″N 79°46′00″W
Saskatchewan	Northwest Territories border (60th parallel)	North Dakota border east of Northgate	Manitoba border, south of Gainsborough, Saskatchewan	Alberta border
Yukon	Shore of Beaufort Sea along 141st Meridian	British Columbia border	YT-BC-NT tripoint	Boundary Peak 187 (60°18′22.929″N, 141°00′7.128″W). Westernmost point of land in Canada.

== See also ==
- Extreme points of Canada
- List of highest points of Canadian provinces and territories
- Extreme communities of Canada
- Nordicity
- Remote and isolated community
