= Point Udall =

Point Udall may refer to:

- Point Udall (Guam), named after Mo Udall and regarded as the westernmost point of the United States
- Point Udall (U.S. Virgin Islands), named after Stewart Udall and regarded as the easternmost point of the United States
