= Agualin =

Agualin, sometimes Aguarin or Diego de Aguarin, was a Chamorro chief who led a siege of Hagåtña (1676–1677) on Guam during the Spanish-Chamorro Wars. This was the second of three unsuccessful sieges of the Spanish presidio carried out by Chamorus seeking to eject the colonial presence, with the final widespread violence on Guam in 1683. While Spanish colonial history vilified Agualin as being anti-Christian and anti-civilization, a modern reevaluation reframes Agualin as a champion of CHamoru nationalism.

== Background ==
In 1668, Jesuit missionary Diego Luis de San Vitores had arrived and set up the first permanent Spanish colonial presence in Hagåtña. Rising tensions led Hurao to command the first siege of the Spanish presidio in Hagåtña in 1670. This siege failed but the tensions remained, leading to the killing of San Vitores at the hands of Matå'pang in 1672. After an outbreak of anti-Spanish violence in 1674, garrison commander Damián de Esplana conducted a brutal campaign to suppress pockets of insurgency. Francisco de Irisarri y Vivar, who was the first person to have the title of governor of the Spanish Mariana Islands, arrived in June 1676 and continued Esplana's campaign to force CHamoru recognition of Spanish dominion, while harshly punishing anyone who had actually attacked colonial forces.

== Biography ==
Agualin was from Hagåtña and blind. By mid-1676, the Spanish campaign of retaliation and suppression had caused anger among many CHamorus. Agualin had apparently been present during the suppression of an uprising in the village of Orote on the Orote Peninsula. A baptized girl had married one of the Spanish militia against her father's wishes, who then incited an anti-Spanish riot that killed a mission assistant. A column led by Irissari marched to Orote to put down the insurrection, hanged the father, and escorted the new couple back to Hagåtña for their own safety. Agualin was reportedly enraged by the mistreatment of the corpse by the children at the local Catholic school, as ancestor veneration was a cornerstone of traditional CHamoru religious belief.

In the late summer of 1676, Agualin began visiting villages around Guam to make speeches encouraging an uprising, like Hurao before him. The Spanish kept records of a speech by Agualin, in which he stated in part:

In the twelve years since the excessive kindness of those of Hagåtña admitted the Spanish to our islands, you tell me what advantages we have experienced from their contact with our lands? Are we richer now than before they came? No, because we are as naked now as when they came in. Rather if any of us have acquired some clothes by serving them, that only serves in making us ashamed of the rest of us. Indeed our nudity makes us ashamed now, but when we were all naked, it did not matter. The fruits of our labor are almost the same now, as always, except that they make us work at their expense and they use us in their projects, either for free, or for very little payment.

Why don't we pay attention to how we have to take revenge against the Spanish soldiers, and beat their firearms? I tell you there are few of them, and there are so many of us that if all the towns came together there will be a thousand of us for every one of them. Why should so many fear so few? With just our stones we can bury them. Besides, isn't it true that these men live at our expense? The food supplies we give them, isn't it what we eat? If we simply cut the way so that no one can sell them the fruits that they need to maintain themselves, are other weapons needed to finish them off? It is clear that hunger itself will wear them down and finish them off. So you may stand assured that if you help me, we will be rid of them soon. What is important is for us to keep the secret, not just from them to catch them unaware, but also from all other towns that are friendly with them. Those who are more to be feared are those near the garrison, like Ayran and Tupungan, as they have churches there. However, if they are attacked without warning, they will not be able to resist the power of four or six towns.

=== Uprising ===
Agualin and his force of about 500 warriors attacked the village of Ayran on August 29, 1676, burning the church, priests' residence, and religious schools. The force gathered to attack Tepungan the next day, which was the feast day of St. Rose of Lima and a new church was being dedicated. However, Irrisari and his soldiers were attending the ceremony and Agualin decided not to attack when the Spanish were present in force. A week later, a large force attacked the pastor of Orote and his eight guards as they were traveling to Hagåtña. In a careful ploy, a man named Cheref in a canoe arrived at the shoreline and offered to rescue the Spaniards. Once they were well out to sea, Cheref and his companions overturned the canoe and killed the floundering Spaniards with clubs and spears. In mid-October 1676, Agualin and a force of 1,500 men besieged the fort at Hagåtña. However, it still largely observed the traditional forms of CHamoru warfare, which was largely ceremonial and did not involve a large amount of killing. Military action during the siege largely consisted of the CHamoru force standing beyond the range of Spanish muskets, yelling insults, and launching volleys of slingstones. The vastly outnumbered Spanish would occasionally sally forth, at which Agualin's force would retreat from the attack, quickly reestablishing the siege lines once the Spanish returned to their walls. Agualin's force destroyed the cornfield that was the main food source for the presidio, but the Spanish were able to survive by growing crops within the walls and with food smuggled through the lines from pro-Spanish CHamoru, such as Ayhi. The pattern of ceremonial attacks upon the walls continued until late January 1677, when the besieging force simply left.

The anti-Spanish CHamoru moved north, with the presence of Agualin recorded in Haputo in 1678, and many resisters fleeing across the water to Rota. Agualin and his warriors would use Rota as a base for strikes on the Spanish on Guam. In June 1678, a new Spanish governor, Juan Antonio de Salas, arrived and began an effective policy of military campaigns against centers of resistance while rewarding villages that turned over "criminals." By 1680, the Spanish policy of Reducción has transferred the island's population into only seven towns; the troublesome villages of the north that had given sanctuary to Agualin's rebels were depopulated, with Inapsan at Ritidian Point being the only populated place allowed in the north.

Agualin was killed for his role in the anti-Spanish insurgency, but sources disagree on how. One story was that he was recognized while coming ashore in a canoe and killed in 1679. Another account states that he was captured on Rota in August 1680, brought to the Hagåtña presidio, and hung. In late 1680, acting governor José de Quiroga y Losada landed on Rota in the face of light resistance, burnt the houses of the anti-Spanish CHamorus from Guam, transferred 150 people to towns on Guam, and executed five or six men who were adjudged responsible for the deaths of members of the Spanish garrison, ending Rota's role as a refuge for Agualin's followers.
