= Cape Wrangell =

Westernmost point of Alaska

Coordinates: 52°55′28″N 172°28′22″E

Cape Wrangell (Alaska)

Cape Wrangell is considered to be the westernmost point of Alaska and all of the United States by direction of travel, named after the Russian explorer and seaman Ferdinand von Wrangel. It is located on Attu Island, which is situated in the Near Islands. Following this definition of westernmost, an alternative westernmost point would be located on the tiny Peaked Island, only about 200 metres (656 ft) in diameter, just off the coast of Attu to the west, but because both sit west of the 180th meridian, these two are at times viewed as the easternmost points of the United States.
