= Stewart Udall =

American politician (1920–2010)

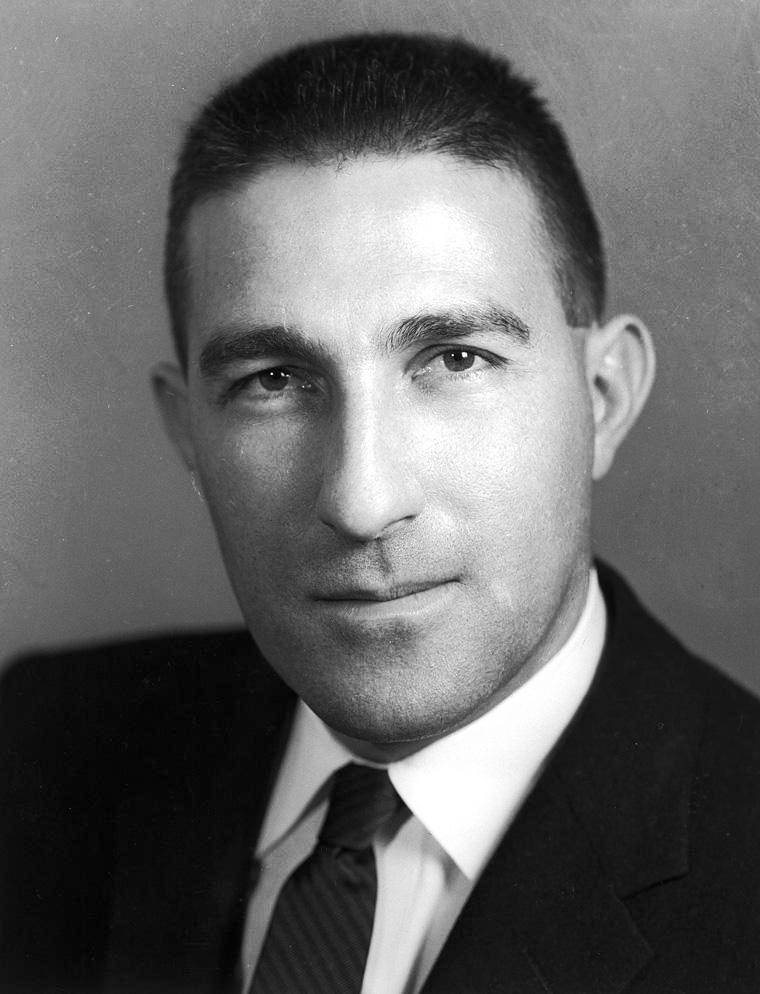
- Udall in the 1960s

37th United States Secretary of the Interior
- In office January 21, 1961 – January 20, 1969
- President: John F. Kennedy; Lyndon B. Johnson
- Preceded by: Fred A. Seaton
- Succeeded by: Wally Hickel

Member of the U.S. House of Representatives from Arizona's 2nd district
- In office January 3, 1955 – January 18, 1961
- Preceded by: Harold Patten
- Succeeded by: Mo Udall

Personal details
- Born: Stewart Lee Udall; January 31, 1920 St. Johns, Arizona, U.S.
- Died: March 20, 2010 (aged 90) Santa Fe, New Mexico, U.S.
- Party: Democratic
- Spouse: Ermalee Webb (m. 1947; died 2001)
- Children: 6, including Tom
- Education: Eastern Arizona College; University of Arizona (LLB)

Military service
- Allegiance: United States
- Branch/service: United States Army
- Unit: Fifteenth Air Force
- Battles/wars: World War II

Stewart Lee Udall (January 31, 1920 – March 20, 2010) was an American politician and environmentalist who belonged to the Democratic Party. After serving three terms as a congressman from Arizona, he served as Secretary of the Interior from 1961 to 1969, under presidents John F. Kennedy and Lyndon B. Johnson. A staunch liberal, he is best known for enthusiastically promoting environmentalism while in the cabinet, with success primarily under President Johnson.

== Early life and education ==
Stewart Udall was born on January 31, 1920, in Saint Johns, Arizona, to Louisa Lee Udall (1893–1974) and Levi Stewart Udall (1891–1960). He had five siblings: Inez, Elma, Morris (Mo), Eloise, and David Burr. As a young boy Stewart worked on the family farm in St. Johns. He was remembered by his mother as a child with tremendous energy and an unquenchable curiosity.

Udall attended the University of Arizona for two years until World War II. He served four years in the Air Force as an enlisted gunner on a B-24 Liberator, flying fifty missions over Western Europe from Italy with the 736th Bomb Squadron, 454th Bomb Group, for which he received the Air Medal with three Oak Leaf Clusters. He returned to the University of Arizona in 1946, where he attended law school and played guard on a championship basketball team. In 1947, Udall, along with his brother Mo, helped integrate the University of Arizona cafeteria. Mo and Stewart were respected student athletes and Mo was student body president. On their way to lunch at the Student Union one day, they saw a group of black students eating lunch outside the building. Black students were allowed to buy food in the cafeteria but had to eat outside. When Mo and Stewart invited Morgan Maxwell Jr., a black freshman, to share their table in the cafeteria, it helped to calm some long-simmering issues surrounding racial segregation at the university.

== Career ==
Udall received his law degree and was admitted to the Arizona bar in 1948. He began his law practice in Tucson shortly thereafter. Udall became increasingly active in public service, being elected to the School Board of Amphitheater Public Schools (District 10) in Tucson in June 1951. As a school board member, he participated in desegregating the Amphitheater School District before the U.S. Supreme Court ruled in Brown v. Board of Education. In 1954, Udall was elected to the U.S. House of Representatives from Arizona's Second District. He served with distinction in the House for three terms on the Interior and Education and Labor committees.

=== Secretary of the Interior ===
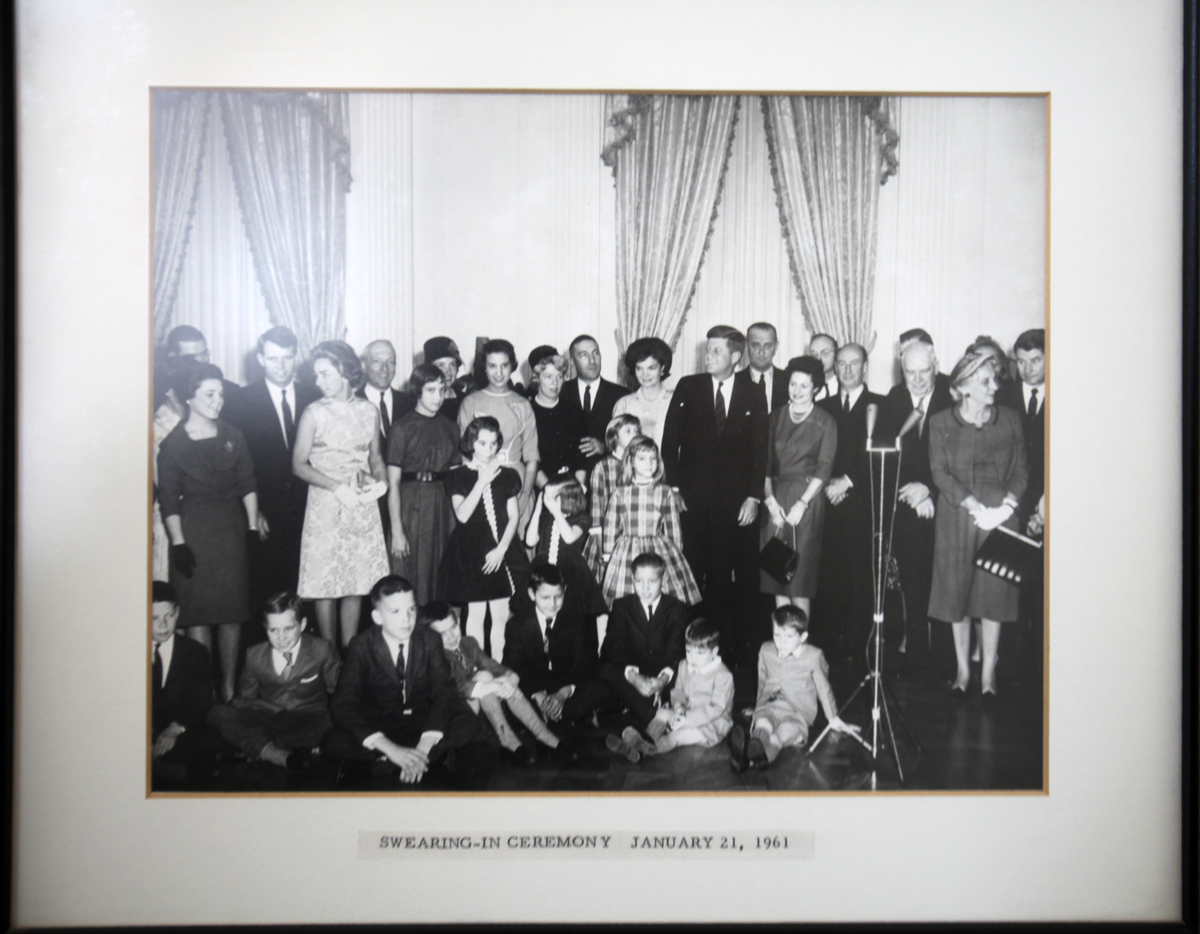
Udall (rear) standing next to Mrs. John F. Kennedy at the president's swearing-in ceremony, January 21, 1961

From 1961 to 1969 Udall served as Secretary of the Interior under presidents John F. Kennedy and Lyndon B. Johnson. Under his leadership, the Interior Department aggressively promoted an expansion of federal public lands and assisted with the enactment of major environmental legislation. Among his many accomplishments, Udall oversaw the addition of four national parks, six national monuments, eight national seashores and lakeshores, nine national recreation areas, twenty national historic sites, and fifty-six national wildlife refuges, including Canyonlands National Park in Utah, North Cascades National Park in Washington, Redwood National Park in California, the Great Swamp National Wildlife Refuge in New Jersey, and the Appalachian National Scenic Trail stretching from Georgia to Maine.

Udall played a key role in the enactment of environmental laws such as the Clear Air, Water Quality and Clean Water Restoration Acts and Amendments, the Wilderness Act of 1964, the Endangered Species Preservation Act of 1966, the Land and Water Conservation Fund Act of 1965, the Solid Waste Disposal Act of 1965, the National Trail System Act of 1968, and Wild and Scenic Rivers Act of 1968.

In 1961, weeks after becoming the Secretary of Interior Udall told Washington Redskins owner, George Preston Marshall, that he had to integrate the football team as every other franchise in the NFL already had, as a condition of use of the newly built and federally owned District of Columbia Stadium. Marshall integrated the team in 1962. On July 27, 1962, Udall sent a letter to the United States Geological Survey's board chairman to discuss policy on the use of ethnic slurs on the organization's topographical maps product. This led to a wider codified policy by the USGS against use of any ethnic slur in any map name.

In September 1962, Udall was summoned unexpectedly into a meeting with Soviet Premier Nikita Khrushchev while on a tour of the Soviet Union. It was during this meeting that Khrushchev famously hinted at his secret deployment of nuclear missiles to Cuba by telling Udall: "It's been a long time since you could spank us like a little boy. Now we can swat your ass." This was a prelude to the Cuban Missile Crisis.

Udall supported a plan created by the US Army Corps of Engineers to construct the Tocks Island Dam for the purpose of creating a reservoir for the benefit of the New York City water supply. After forcing homeowners out of their homes through buyouts and condemnation, the plan was abandoned. The homes that had not been bulldozed were simply left to deteriorate. With the election of President Reagan, the Tocks Island Dam project was shelved.

Udall also helped spark a cultural renaissance in America by setting in motion initiatives that led to the Kennedy Center, Wolf Trap National Park for the Performing Arts, the National Endowment for the Arts, the National Endowment for the Humanities, and the revived Ford's Theatre. Upon Udall's recommendation President Kennedy asked former U.S. Poet Laureate Robert Frost to read an original poem at his inauguration, establishing a tradition for that occasion.

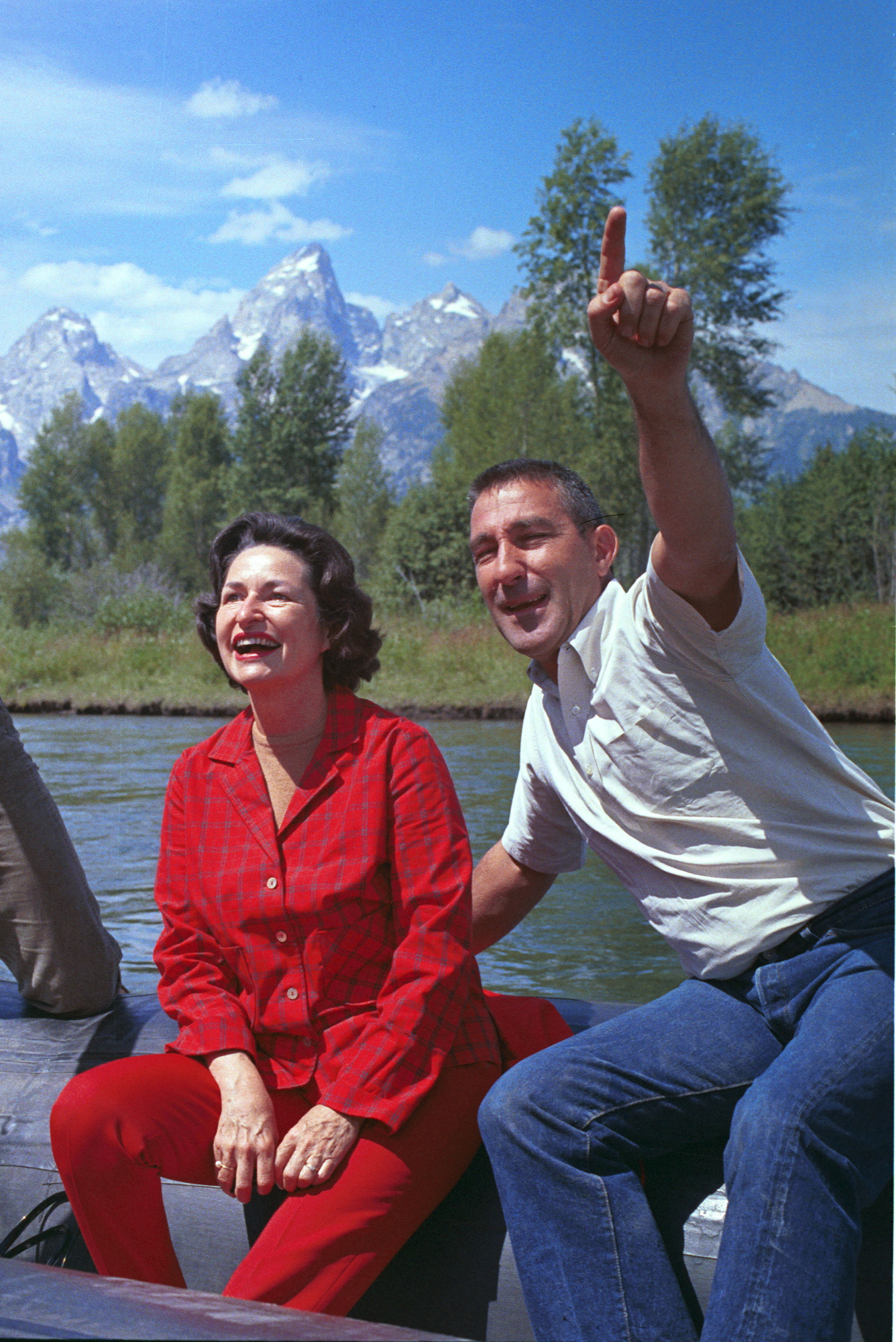
Lady Bird Johnson and Udall on a trip to Grand Teton National Park, August 1964

A pioneer of the environmental movement, Udall warned of a conservation crisis in the 1960s with his best-selling book on environmental attitudes in the United States, The Quiet Crisis (1963). In the book, he wrote about the dangers of pollution, overuse of natural resources, and dwindling open spaces. Along with Rachel Carson's Silent Spring, The Quiet Crisis is credited with creating a consciousness in the country that led to the environmental movement. Udall was a staunch supporter of Rachel Carson and her work. Stewart Udall once stated, "Plans to protect air and water, wilderness and wildlife are in fact, plans to protect Man."

Udall also had the foresight as Secretary of the Interior, to spearhead the use of NASA satellites to produce images of Earth from space for scientific research, leading to development of the Earth Resources Observation and Science (EROS) center at the U.S. Geological Survey. Over the course of more than forty years, that program mapped the Earth from space, showing the physical changes to the planet.

In 1967, the National Audubon Society awarded Udall its highest honor, the Audubon medal.

=== Energy policy ===
During the energy crisis in the 1970s, Udall advocated the use of solar energy as one remedy to the crisis. In October 1972, Udall published a seminal article in The Atlantic Monthly, entitled "The Last Traffic Jam". The article contains arguments for the proposition that "less is more" and foresaw problems with U.S. transportation and energy policy and competition with emerging markets for scarce resources. In 1974, Udall, along with Charles Conconi and David Osterhout, wrote The Energy Balloon, discussing the energy policies of the United States.

=== Later years ===
After leaving government service in 1969, Udall taught for a year at the School of Forestry at Yale University as a visiting professor of environmental humanism. He later devoted his time to writing books and articles about environmental issues and to practicing law. In 1971, he published America's Natural Treasures: National Nature Monuments and Seashores, which is about America's national parks, monuments, and reserves.

In 1979, he left Washington to return to the West. In 1980, Udall was elected to the Central Arizona Water Conservation District Board and commissioned as a member of the Morrison Institute. Udall was presented with the Ansel Adams Award in 1986, the Wilderness Society's highest conservation award. He also was awarded the United Nations Gold Medal for Lifetime Achievement. Udall received the Common Cause Public Service Achievement Award for his lifelong protection of the environment and defense of American citizens who were victims of nuclear weapons testing.

In 1987, he published To the Inland Empire: Coronado and our Spanish Legacy, which retraces the trails of Spanish explorer Francisco Vásquez de Coronado as he searched for the "golden cities" of Cibola in what now is Arizona, New Mexico, Oklahoma, and Texas. Udall published The Quiet Crisis and the Next Generation in 1988, a revised edition with nine new chapters of The Quiet Crisis (1963). "The Quiet Crisis" introduced the Myth of Superabundance. In 1990, he co-authored Beyond the Mythic West, which examines effects of change upon the inhabitants and lands of the western United States. In 1998, he published The Myths of August: A Personal Exploration of Our Tragic Cold War Affairs with the Atom.

In November 2009, Congress enacted legislation to honor Stewart Udall by renaming the Morris K. Udall Foundation as the Morris K. Udall and Stewart L. Udall Foundation, in recognition of the historic Interior Secretary's contributions. The Udall Foundation, an independent federal agency, was created initially to honor the legacy of the late Morris Udall, who represented Southern Arizona in the U.S. House of Representatives for thirty years. Stewart Udall, who also represented Southern Arizona in Congress from 1955 to 1961, is Morris Udall's older brother. The two worked together on many environmental and Native American initiatives while Stewart Udall was Secretary of the Interior and Morris Udall a member of Congress. Congress recognized that the Udall legacy really was a shared legacy, rooted in the work of the Udall brothers, which dominated environmental reform for three decades.

One of Udall's last essays, published in 2008, was his "Letter to My Grandchildren", written with his wife, Ermalee, which asked for their grandchildren's assistance in advocating for protection of the Earth. This letter resulted in Udall being contacted by the VillageTown Stewards who asked that they videotape the thoughts in that letter, since it was more likely that the generation of his grandchildren watch internet videos than read letters. Udall agreed, and the video may be seen on-line at, Stewart Udall on History: the greatest mistake. This video was transcribed and adapted to a chapter of a book, Life Liberty Happiness. Udall also agreed to serve as Chairman Emeritus of the VillageTown Stewards. The video was filmed coincidentally on the Summer solstice of 2009 and Udall died nine months later on the Spring equinox. His public memorial was held on the Summer solstice of 2010. It is believed this video was the last recording of Udall's views.

== Death and legacy ==
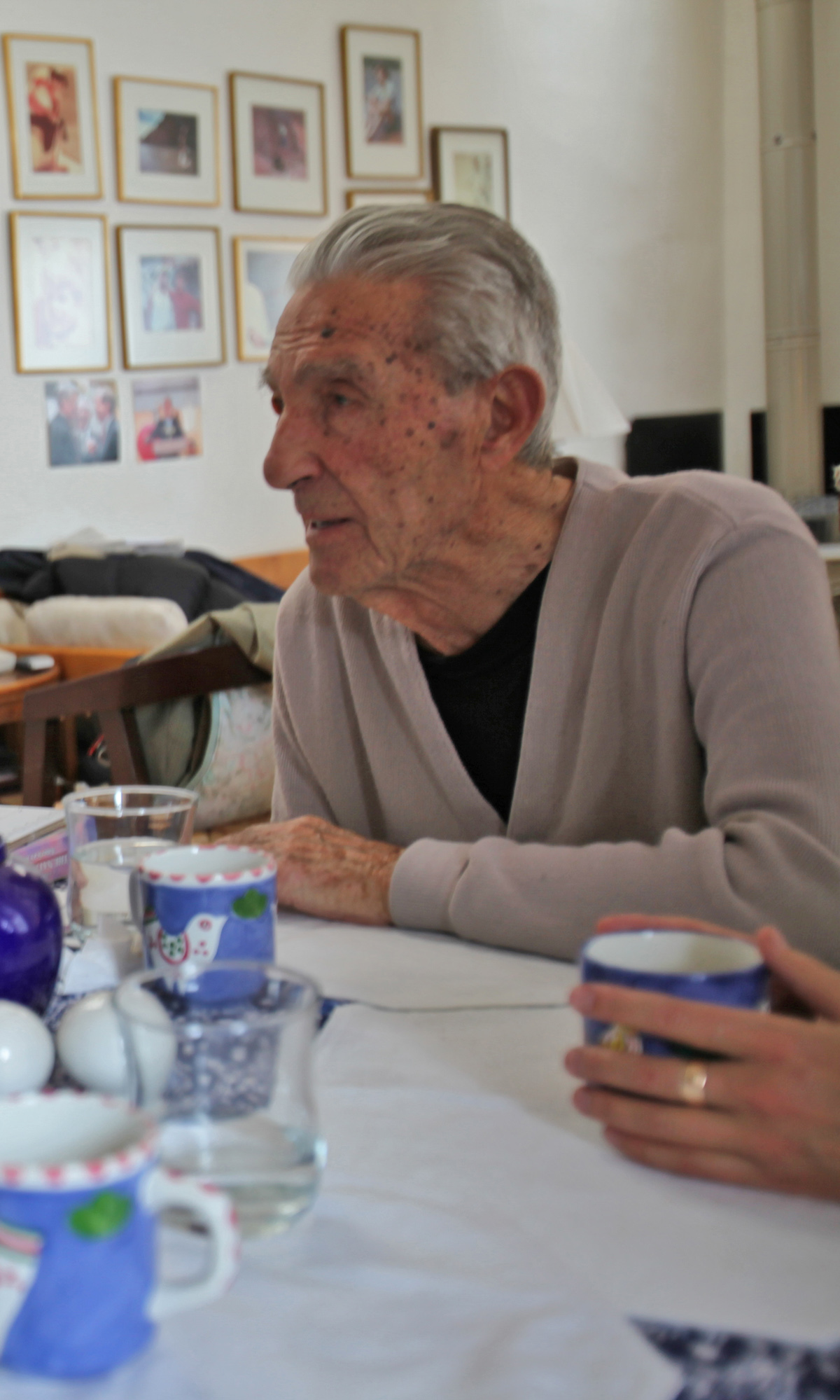
Udall at home January 23, 2010, less than two months before his death

In the early hours of the Spring Equinox, March 20, 2010, Udall died peacefully at his home in the foothills of Santa Fe, New Mexico, age 90.

After his death, President Obama noted on March 20, 2010, "For the better part of three decades, Stewart Udall served this nation honorably. Whether in the skies above Italy in World War II, in Congress, or as Secretary of the Interior, Stewart Udall left an indelible mark on this nation and inspired countless Americans who will continue his fight for clean air, clean water, and to maintain our many natural treasures."

On June 8, 2010, President Barack Obama signed legislation to designate the United States Department of the Interior Building as the "Stewart Lee Udall Department of the Interior Building."

Point Udall, on St. Croix in the U.S. Virgin Islands, was named for him in 1968, honoring Udall's work to support the economy of the island group. Point Udall, USVI is the easternmost point of the United States in the direction of travel. The westernmost point in the direction of travel, Point Udall, Guam, is named for his brother Mo. This means that "America's day ... begin(s) and end(s) at a Point Udall."

== Awards and decorations ==
During his USAAF service, Udall earned the following decorations:

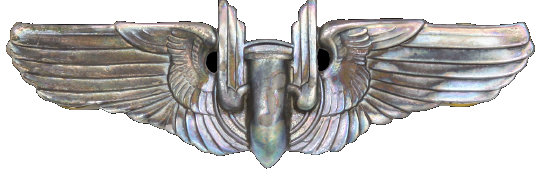
Army Air Forces Aerial Gunner Badge

Air Medal with three bronze oak leaf cluster
Presidential Unit Citation with bronze oak leaf cluster
Army Good Conduct Medal
American Campaign Medal
European–African–Middle Eastern Campaign Medal with two bronze campaign stars
World War II Victory Medal

In 1967, Udall received the National Audubon Society's highest honor, the Audubon Medal.

== Personal life ==
Stewart Udall was married to Ermalee Webb (died 2001) with whom he had two daughters and four sons. He was the brother of U.S. Representative and 1976 presidential candidate, Mo Udall; he served as Mo's campaign manager during the Democratic primary election, which Mo lost to Jimmy Carter. Stewart Udall's son Tom Udall and nephew Mark Udall (Mo's son), both former members of the U.S. House of Representatives, were elected to the United States Senate from New Mexico and Colorado, respectively, in 2008. Mark lost his seat in 2014, and Tom retired at the end of his second term in 2021.

Udall was interviewed for two Ken Burns documentaries for PBS: The West, which features his ancestor John D. Lee's role in the Mountain Meadows massacre of 1857, and The National Parks: America's Best Idea, in his capacity as a former Secretary of the Interior, who oversaw the National Park Service.

Udall was the last surviving original member of Kennedy's cabinet. Udall's death left W. Willard Wirtz as the last surviving member of John F. Kennedy's cabinet. Wirtz died on April 24, 2010.

== Bibliography ==
=== Books written by Udall ===
- The Quiet Crisis, 1963
- 1976: Agenda for Tomorrow, 1968
- America's Natural Treasures: National Nature Monuments and Seashores, 1971
- To the Inland Empire: Coronado and our Spanish Legacy, 1987
- The Quiet Crisis and the Next Generation, 1988 (Revised edition with nine new chapters of The Quiet Crisis (1963))
- In Coronado's Footsteps, 1991
- The Myths of August: A Personal Exploration of Our tragic Cold War Affair with the Atom, 1994
- Majestic Journey, 1995, (Reissued To the Inland Empire under new title)
- The Forgotten Founders: Rethinking The History Of The Old West, 2002

=== Books co-authored by Udall ===
- Night Comes to the Cumberlands, 1963, Harry M. Caudill, Stewart L. Udall (Foreword)
- A Heritage Restored: America's Wildlife Refuges, 1969, Murphy Robert William, Stewart L. Udall (Foreword)
- The Energy Balloon, 1974, with Charles Conconi and David Osterhout
- Beyond the Mythic West, 1988, with Patricia Nelson Limerick, Charles F. Wilkinson
- Arizona, Wild & Free, 1993, with nephew Randy Udall for the Arizona Game and Fish Department
- National Parks of America, 1993, David Muench with contributors James R. Udall and Stewart L. Udall
- The Wilderness from Chamberlain Farm: A Story Of Hope For The American Wild, 2001, Dean B. Bennett, Stewart L. Udall (Foreword)
- Death, Daring, & Disaster – Search and Rescue in the National Parks, 2005, Charles R. "Butch" Farabee Jr., Stewart L. Udall (Foreword)
- The Navajo People and Uranium Mining, 2007, with editors Doug Brugge, Timothy Benally, and Esther Yazzie-Lewis, Stewart L. Udall (Foreword)
- Life Liberty Happiness – A journey from Blandville to a VillageTown, 2010, Claude Lewenz, and Michael Henderson, Stewart L. Udall (co-authors)

=== Books about Udall ===
- Legacies of Camelot: Stewart and Lee Udall, American Culture, and the Arts, 2008, by L. Boyd Finch
- Showdown: JFK and the Integration of the Washington Redskins, 2011, by Thomas G. Smith
- Stewart L. Udall: Steward of the Land, 2017, by Thomas G. Smith

== See also ==
- Leopold Report
- Navajo Nation: Lung cancer
- The Navajo People and Uranium Mining
- Lee-Hamblin family

U.S. House of Representatives
Preceded by Harold A. Patten	U.S. Representative, Arizona 2nd Congressional District; 1955–1961	Succeeded by Mo Udall
Political offices
Preceded by Fred Seaton	U.S. Secretary of the Interior; Served under: John F. Kennedy, Lyndon B. Johnson; 1961–1969	Succeeded by Wally Hickel
