= Orote Peninsula =

Western promontory on Guam

Coordinates: 13.44°N 144.63°E

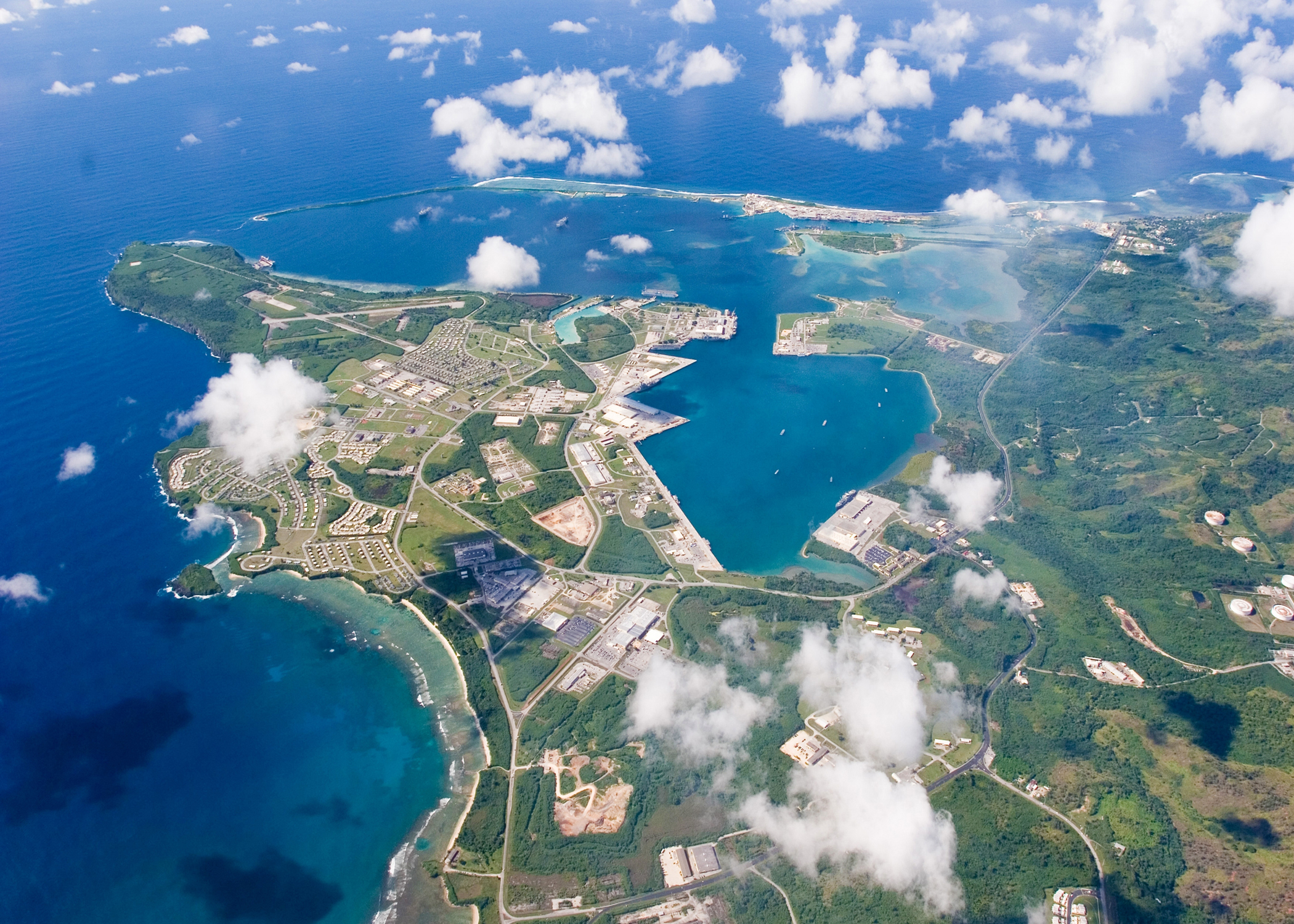
Orote Peninsula in 2006, looking northwest

The Orote Peninsula is a four kilometer-long peninsula jutting from the west coast of the United States territory of Guam. A major geologic feature of the island, it forms the southern coast of Apra Harbor and the northern coast of Agat Bay. Its tip, Point Udall, is Guam's westernmost point and also the United States' westernmost point by travel, not longitude. The peninsula historically was the site of the important Chamorro village of Sumay, as well as Fort Santiago of the Spanish colonial period. In modern times, the peninsula is politically in the village of Santa Rita, but it is controlled in its entirety by Naval Base Guam.

== Geology ==
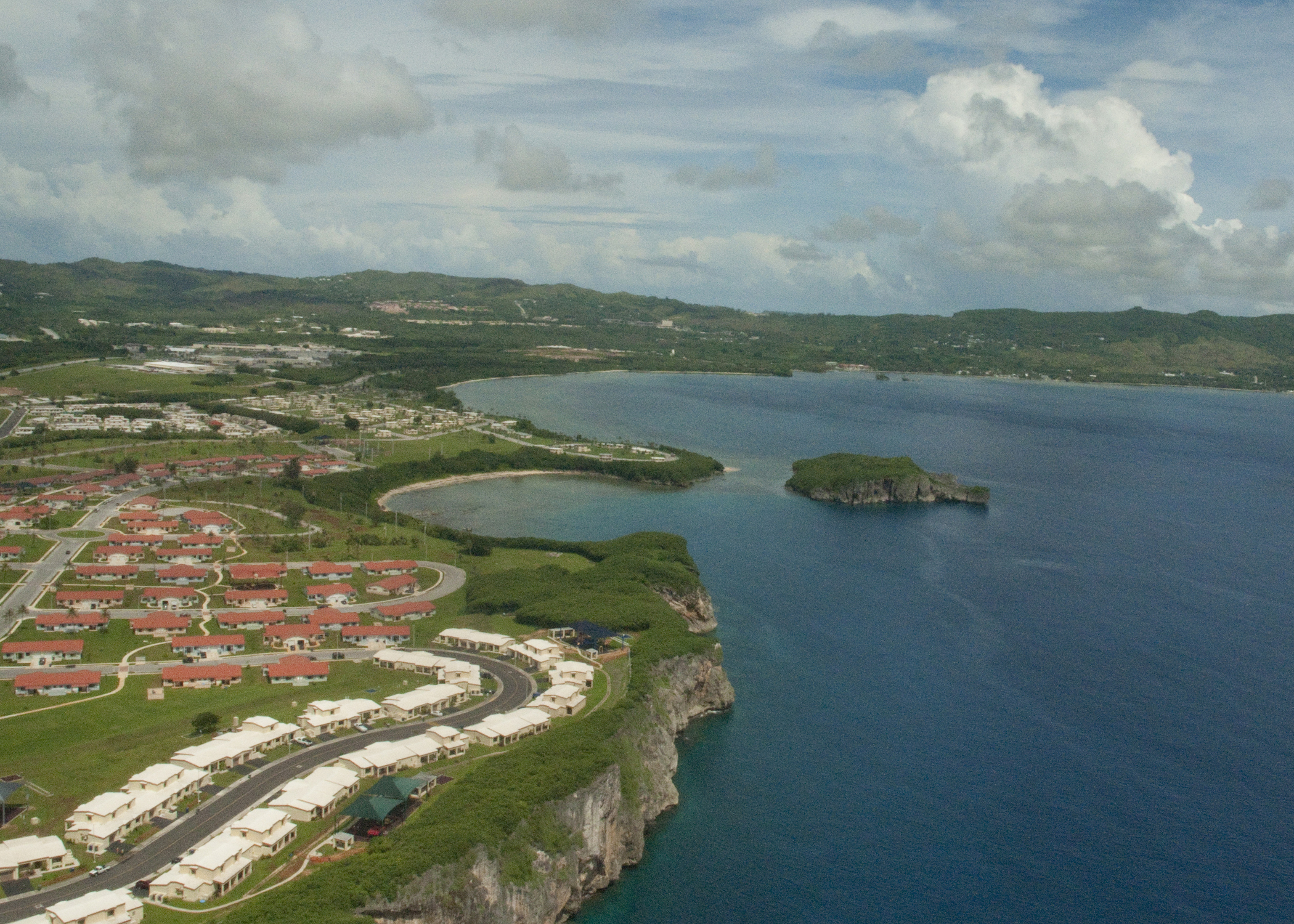
Southern coast of the peninsula along Agat Bay in 2010. Two beaches, Tipalao (also called "Old Wives')(nearer) and Dadi, are visible. Turtle Rock Island lies between.

Orote Peninsula, like the eastern Guam, is a raised limestone plateau reaching heights of 190 ft (58m). The limestone dates to the Pliocene to Pleistocene, known as "Mariana limestone." It thus differs dramatically from areas immediately inland, which are volcanic highlands. It is believed that the Talofofo Fault that runs from Guam across the island and through Ordnance Annex runs along the southern edge of the Orote Peninsula.

== History ==
The peninsula was inhabited by multiple communities during the Pre-Latte Period from 3,500 BC to 500 AD. These include:

- The NHRP-listed Orote Historical Complex, which includes a cave complex located at Point Udall (previously, Orote Point),
- Gab Gab, on the northern side of the peninsula;
- Orote Village, located next to Dadi Beach on the south side; and
- Sumay, which had a cave complex suggesting habitation well before European Contact.

=== Spanish period ===
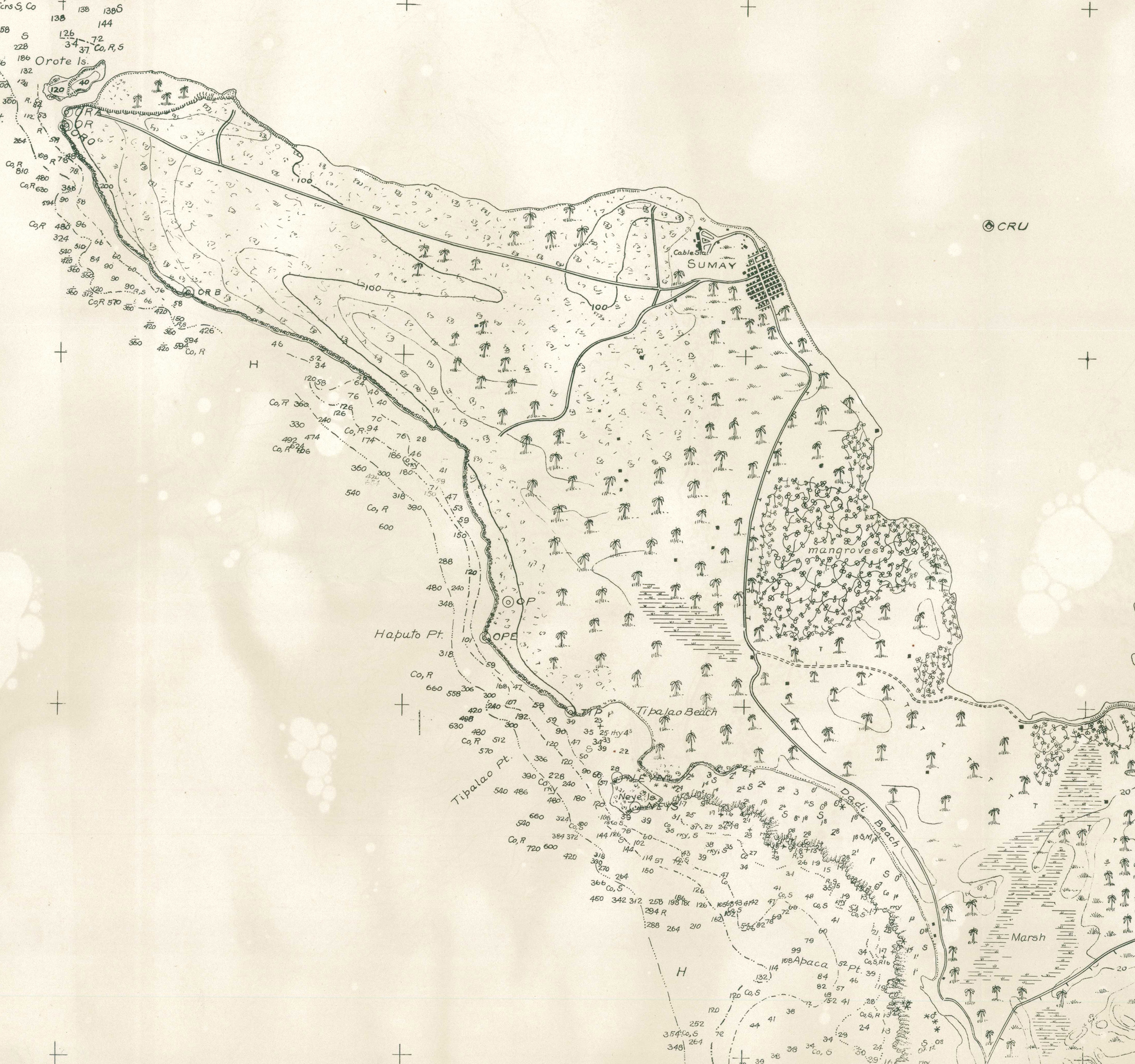
A 1916–1917 map indicates Sumay was the only major inhabited area of the peninsula

In July 1676, during the period of the Spanish–Chamorro Wars, a Jesuit missionary was assigned to Orote. The job of this Jesuit was to conduct baptisms and marriages in the effort to solidify Spanish control of the island. However, the village rebelled and was destroyed, with its population distributed to centralized villages where they could be better monitored and controlled.

In the early 18th century, Spain's Council of the Indies grew increasingly concerned about competing navies threatening the Manila galleon trade and Spain's possessions in the Pacific. This was aggravated by an attack in 1721 by the English privateer John Clipperton upon a supply ship from Cavite anchored at Merizo. In 1734, Governor Francisco de Cárdenas Pacheco opened up new anchorage in Apra Harbor, which offered greater protection from attack. Fort San Luis was built in 1737 near current-day Gab Gab to protect the new anchorage. A second battery, Fort Santiago, was built at Orote Point to guard the entrance to the harbor. One account suggests Fort Santiago began to be constructed in 1721. The battery was large enough to house six cannon, and also had soldier's quarters and munitions storage. In the 1800s, Sumay became a thriving port town, largely catering to the whaling ships. However, the forts gradually deteriorated. In 1817, Otto von Kotzebue reported that Fort San Luis was no longer in use. The three cannon at Fort Santiago were reported unusable in 1853 and, in 1884, Governor Francisco Olive y Garcia declared that Fort Santiago was useful only as an observation post. As a result, during the 1898 Spanish–American War, the Spanish were unable to resist the American capture of Guam.

=== 20th and 21st centuries ===
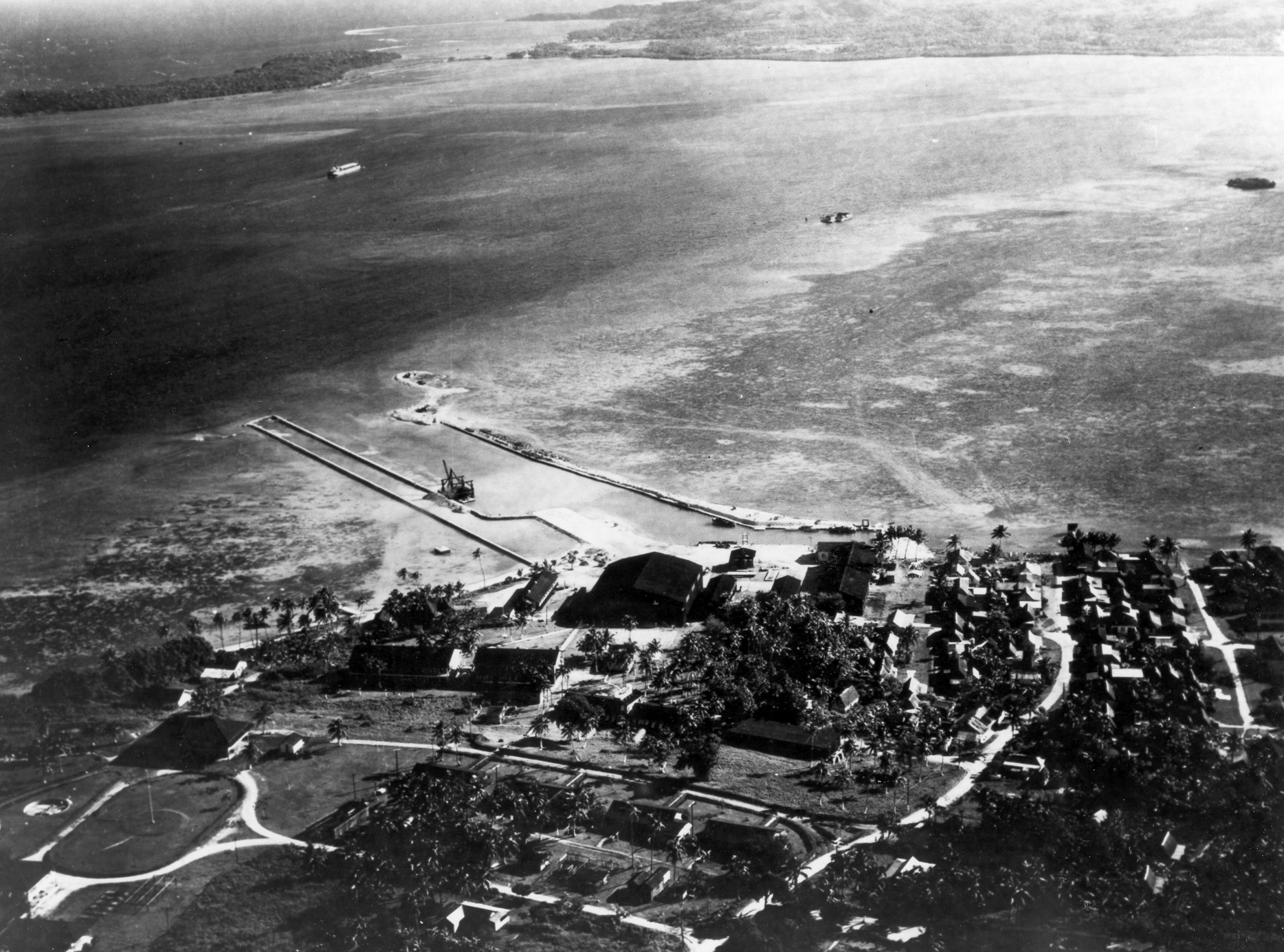
Sumay in the 1930s

The Americans continued making the peninsula a center of military and economic activity. In 1903, the Commercial Pacific Cable Company laid submarine communications cable for telegraph through a station at Sumay, linking the United States to Asia, and each to Guam, for the first time. In the 1920 census, Sumay was Guam's second most populous village with 1,209 residents. On March 17, 1921, a U.S. Marine Squadron of 10 pilots and 90 enlisted men arrived and set up a base at Sumay for their amphibious aircraft, including a hangar. In 1926, the squadron built administration offices, but the next year was deployed to China to protect American lives in the Nanking incident of 1927. On September 23, 1928, Patrol Squadron 3-M arrived on Guam as replacements. However, the U.S. decided that Naval Air Station Sumay was too expensive and shut it down on February 23, 1931.

Guam's first golf course, Sumay Golf Links, was established in the village in 1923. This was followed by Pan American Airways establishing a base for its China Clipper in 1935 in Sumay, establishing the first trans-Pacific passenger air service. Pan American also built Guam's first hotel in the village.

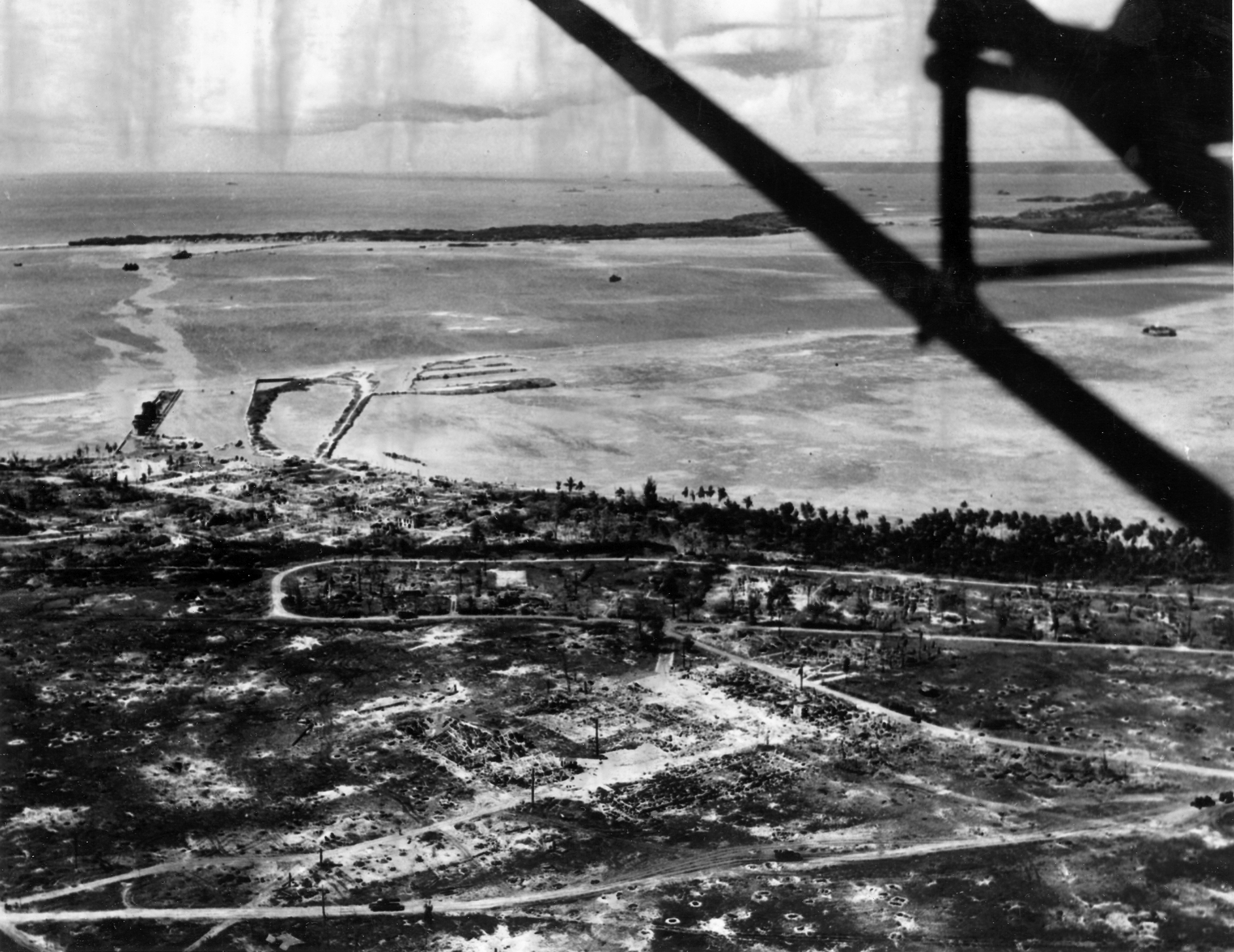
Destruction of Sumay after the 1944 Battle of Guam

During the Japanese invasion on December 8, 1941, Sumay was targeted for bombing. The residents fled inland but were soon entirely evicted by the Japanese, who turned the town into a garrison. Sumay residents were moved to various concentration camps over the Japanese occupation of Guam from 1941 to 1944. The Japanese also constructed Orote Field, using Korean and Chamorro labor. Unlike the air station at Sumay, Orote Field was land-based, and used to refuel and rearm Japanese aircraft in the June 1944 Battle of the Philippine Sea, but the field was destroyed by American raids. The U.S. initial U.S. invasion of Guam in July 1944 was designed to attack either sides of the heavily fortified Orote Peninsula, cutting it off from inland support. After fierce fighting, U.S. forces declared the peninsula secured on July 29, 1944. An estimated 3,000 Japanese soldiers died defending Orote Peninsula.

After the end of the Pacific War, the U.S. Navy refused to allow the Sumay residents to return, stating that the area was needed for the new Naval Base Guam, which would become a major military base into the 21st century. Sumay residents were relocated to Santa Rita, ending indigenous habitation of the peninsula.

== Other ==
- Orote includes the small settlement of Lockwood Terrace.
- The 2010 epilogue of the TV show Lost, "The New Man in Charge", takes place on a Dharma Initiative station on the Orote Peninsula.
