= Harold Patten =

American politician

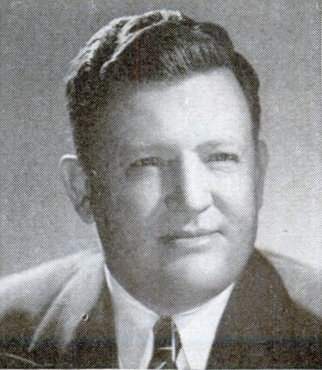
- Patten, c. 1953

Member of the U.S. House of Representatives from Arizona's 2nd district
- In office January 3, 1949 – January 3, 1955
- Preceded by: Richard F. Harless (redistricting)
- Succeeded by: Stewart Udall

Personal details
- Born: October 6, 1907 Husted, Colorado
- Died: September 6, 1969 (aged 61) Tucson, Arizona
- Party: Democratic
- Education: University of Arizona
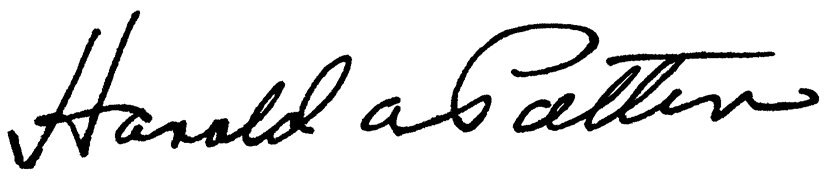
- Signature

Military service
- Allegiance: United States
- Branch/service: United States Army
- Years of service: 1940-1960
- Rank: Lieutenant colonel
- Unit: Seventh Cavalry Regiment; Air Corps; Air Force Reserve
- Battles/wars: World War II: Italian and African Theatres

Harold Ambrose Patten (October 6, 1907 – September 6, 1969) was a Representative in the United States House of Representatives from Arizona.

== Biography ==
Patten was born in Husted, Colorado, on October 6, 1907. In 1916, he moved to Tucson, Arizona. He graduated from the University of Arizona in 1930, and was a coach and teacher of physical education in Tucson High School in 1931 and 1932. He served as director of recreation for the city of Tucson and city schools from 1933 to 1939, and was the State director of recreation in 1939 and 1940.

Entering military service with the Seventh Cavalry Regiment as a first lieutenant in August 1940, he was transferred to the Air Corps in 1941 and spent thirty-one months on foreign service in Africa and Italy. He was discharged as a major on November 21, 1945, and retired July 1, 1960, as a lieutenant colonel in the Air Force Reserve.

He worked as a life insurance agent in Phoenix from 1946 to 1948, and began his political career as a Democrat elected to the 81st, 82nd, and 83rd United States Congresses, serving from January 3, 1949 to January 3, 1955. He was not a candidate for renomination in 1954 and was defeated for the Democratic nomination in 1961 to fill a vacancy in the 87th United States Congress. He resumed his career in the insurance field, and in 1965, was appointed to head a Job Corps Center in Oregon. In this capacity, he organized and directed a Center at Malheur Wildlife Refuge and was director of Center offices in Portland, Oregon.

He died in Tucson, Arizona, on September 6, 1969, and willed his body to University of Arizona College of Medicine for research purposes.

U.S. House of Representatives
Preceded by New district	Member of the U.S. House of Representatives from Arizona's 2nd congressional district 1949–1955	Succeeded by Stewart Udall
