= Orote Historical Complex =

Archaeological and historic site on Guam

- U.S. National Register of Historic Places
- Location within Guam
- Nearest city: Apra Harbor, Guam
- Coordinates: 13°26′48″N 144°37′37″E
- Area: 24 acres (9.7 ha)
- Built: 1721
- NRHP reference No.: 79003744
- Added to NRHP: October 23, 1979

The Orote Historical Complex is a series of prehistoric and historic features at the northern tip of the Orote Peninsula on the island of Guam. This area is on the grounds of Naval Base Guam and requires military permission to see.

Major features include Fort Santiago, built by Spanish colonial authorities in the early 18th century to secure Apra Harbor, the so-called "Spanish Steps", which provide access from the fortifications to a well at the base of the cliff, which may actually be of early 20th-century American origin, and a series of rock shelters and caves exhibiting evidence of human occupation to the Pre-Latte Period (c. 3500 BCE).

The area was listed on the National Register of Historic Places in 1979.

== See also ==
- National Register of Historic Places listings in Guam
