= Mo Udall =

American attorney and politician (1922–1998)

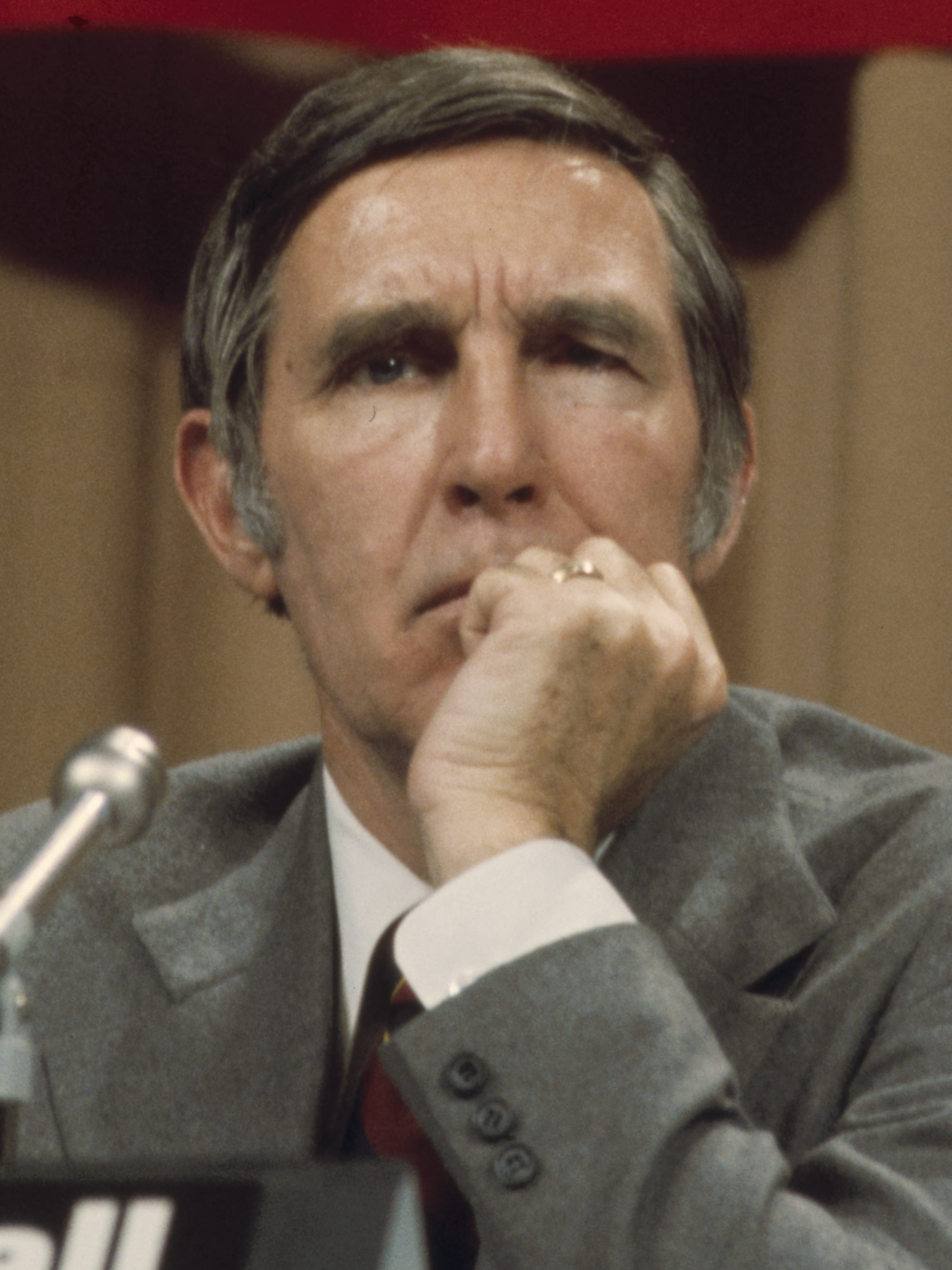
- Udall in 1976

Chair of the House Interior Committee
- In office January 3, 1977 – May 4, 1991
- Preceded by: James A. Haley
- Succeeded by: George Miller

Member of the U.S. House of Representatives from Arizona's 2nd district
- In office May 2, 1961 – May 4, 1991
- Preceded by: Stewart Udall
- Succeeded by: Ed Pastor

Personal details
- Born: Morris King Udall; June 15, 1922 St. Johns, Arizona, U.S.
- Died: December 12, 1998 (aged 76) Washington, D.C., U.S.
- Party: Democratic
- Spouses: Patricia Emery (m. 1949; div. 1966); Ella Royston (m. 1968; died 1988); Norma Gilbert (m. 1989)
- Children: 6, including Mark
- Relatives: Udall family
- Education: University of Arizona (BA); University of Denver (JD)

Military service
- Branch/service: Army Air Forces
- Years of service: 1942–1946
- Rank: Captain
- Battles/wars: World War II: Asiatic-Pacific Theater
- Mo Udall's voice Udall on the possible end of suburbanization Recorded September 10, 1975

Morris King Udall (June 15, 1922 – December 12, 1998) was an American attorney and politician who served as a U.S. representative from Arizona from 1961 to 1991. As a member of the Democratic Party, he was a leading contender for the 1976 Democratic presidential nomination, but ultimately lost to eventual president Jimmy Carter. Udall was noted by many for his independent and liberal views.

In 1961, Udall won a special election to succeed his brother, Stewart Udall, as the congressman for Arizona's 2nd congressional district. In Congress, Udall became a prominent and popular figure for his independent ways, his leading role in the conservation and environmental protection movements, his key role in reforming Congress and political campaigns, and his pioneering role in opposing the Vietnam War.

Udall sought the Democratic Party nomination in the 1976 presidential election, but was defeated by Carter. He supported Ted Kennedy's strong challenge to Carter in the 1980 Democratic primary, and delivered the keynote address at the 1980 Democratic National Convention.

Udall served as chairman of the House Interior Committee from 1977 to 1991. Diagnosed with Parkinson's disease in 1980, he resigned from Congress in 1991 as the effects of the disease worsened. He died in 1998. His son, Mark Udall, represented Colorado in the United States Senate from 2009 to 2015, and his nephew Tom Udall served as a United States Senator from New Mexico from 2009 to 2021. Both also served multiple terms in the U.S. House of Representatives.

== Early life and education ==
Udall was born in 1922 in St. Johns, Arizona, one of six children (New York Times says three sons, two daughters) of Louisa (née Lee) and Levi Stewart Udall. His father was a lawyer who served as Chief Justice of the Arizona Supreme Court from 1946 to 1960. His mother was a writer keenly interested in Indian life and culture. His father preached the importance of responsible people entering public service. Udall and his siblings attended local schools in St. Johns.

At age six in 1928, his right eye was cut by a friend's pocket knife while the friend and he were trying to cut some string; he lost the eye because his family lacked the money to get him prompt treatment. Udall wore a glass eye for the rest of his life, and he later indicated that the loss of his eye influenced both his personality and his politics.

He described his early rural/small-town life in the desert as harsh and primitive, in a town where "everybody worked." Noting they had "no tractors," he added, "we had horses and plows."

While in high school, despite the lost eye, Udall was a star athlete in basketball, and in football as quarterback leading an undefeated team. He also marched in the school band, wrote a political column for the school paper, and took the lead in the school play.

== Military service ==
Udall attempted to enlist in the Army Air Forces during World War II, and almost succeeded by covering his glass eye each time he was told to alternate during the eye exam. After he was medically cleared, another potential enlistee complained that he had been medically rejected for flat feet, while Udall had passed with one eye. The examiners retested Udall under closer scrutiny, and he was rejected. Later, medical standards changed and Udall served in the Army. He joined the Army Air Forces as a private in 1942 and later received his commission as an officer. He commanded an all-black squadron for two years in Louisiana, an experience of which Udall later said, "That really shaped my life," because he had "fought their fights with them... over local discrimination." Udall later served in the South Pacific and achieved the rank of captain before being discharged in 1946.

== Higher education and basketball career ==
After the war, Udall completed his bachelor's degree at the University of Arizona, where he was a star basketball player (team co-captain), President of the Associated Student Government, and a member of Sigma Chi fraternity.

For one year following graduation, Udall played professional basketball with the Denver Nuggets during the 1948–49 National Basketball League season. At the same time, he attended the University of Denver College of Law. He completed his studies at the University of Arizona's law school, where he graduated in 1949 with a Juris Doctor (J.D.) degree.

=== Career statistics ===
Legend
GP	Games played	FGM	Field goals made
FTM	Free throws made	FTA	Free throws attempted
FT%	Free throw percentage	PTS	Total points
PPG	Points per game	**Bold**	Career high

==== NBL ====
===== Regular season =====
Year	Team	GP	FGM	FTM	FTA	FT%	PTS	PPG
1948–49	Denver	57	125	121	171	.708	371	6.5

== Personality and philosophy ==
Udall was a tall (6'5"), Lincolnesque figure with a self-deprecating wit and easy manner. Because of his wit, columnist James J. Kilpatrick deemed him "too funny to be president", which also ended up being the title of his autobiography in the 1980s.

He once said that his physical stature and one eye kept him from ever having a date in high school, and led to his use of self-deprecating humor to survive.

Known for his humor, his irreverent and casual style (particularly his colorful western wear and cowboy boots), and his ethics, Udall was summarized by leading political journalist James M. Perry as "funny, smart, down-to-earth, honest, sassy, patient."

Despite being raised Mormon, his spiritual views changed during his later years. He ceased being active in church by the time he returned from military service. While in college, as he read philosophy and history, Udall abandoned his Mormon faith. In particular, he rejected the cultural view among some Church members of the time that black people were "cursed."

== Early career ==
In 1949 Udall, with his brother, Stewart, started the law firm of Udall & Udall in Tucson, Arizona, practicing law in Tucson until 1961.

Udall was elected as the Pima County chief deputy attorney (1950–1952) and county attorney (1953–1954). In 1954, he failed in a bid to be nominated for a Superior Court judgeship.

He taught labor law at the University of Arizona law school (1955, 1956). In 1961 he became vice-president of the Arizona Bar Association. Udall co-founded the Bank of Tucson, and the Catalina Savings and Loan Association, and in 1960 became president of Tucson's YMCA.

== Political career ==
Throughout his early life, Udall dreamed of public office, but—under pressure from his wife—deferred a congressional race opportunity to his older brother, Stewart Udall. The latter won Arizona's 2nd congressional district seat in 1954. The younger Udall's hopes for a seat on the Arizona Supreme Court (where their father had served) were dashed when the seat went to his ultra-conservative uncle, Jesse Addison Udall, instead.

=== Congressman ===
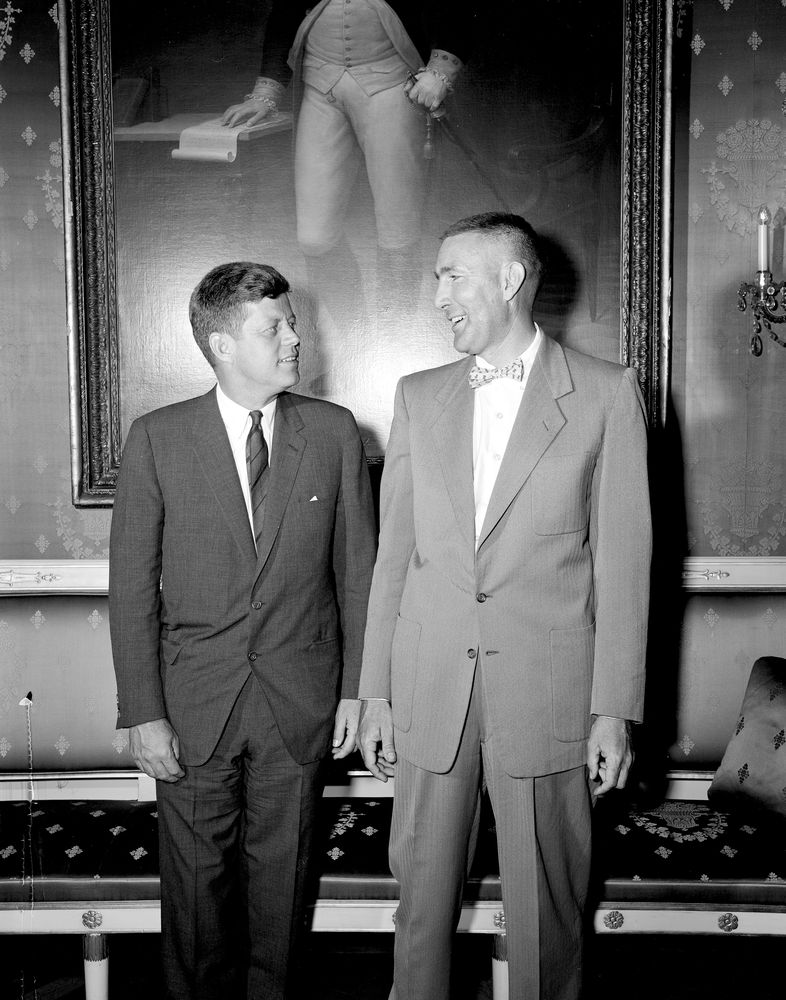
Udall with John F. Kennedy at the White House, May 18, 1961

In 1961, his brother was appointed as Secretary of the Interior in the John F. Kennedy administration. Mo then won a special election for his brother's vacant seat by 2,000 votes, with 51% of the vote. He won the seat in his own right in 1962, and was reelected 13 more times. He faced only one other close race, in 1978, when he received 52 percent of the vote. He held the post until his resignation May 4, 1991.

For his first term, Udall represented the entire state outside of Maricopa County. After the 1960s round of redistricting, his district was reduced to the southern portion of the state, centered on Tucson. After a mid-decade redistricting ordered as a result of Wesberry v. Sanders, his district absorbed some outer portions of the Phoenix area.

From 1977 until his retirement in 1991, Udall chaired the House Committee on Interior and Insular Affairs (on which he'd served since 1963). He also served as ranking member of the Committee of the Post Office and Civil Service, chairman of the Office of Technology Assessment and was a member of the Committee on Foreign Affairs

==== Vietnam War ====
Udall first gained national political notice for a speech October 23, 1967, in Tucson at a major regional civic meeting, with an audience of 2,800—largely civic leaders, mostly supportive of President Johnson's policy on the Vietnam War. Despite their leanings, Udall gave a firm and direct speech calling the nation's involvement in Vietnam "a mistaken and dangerous road." He called for reversing American escalation of the war, and eventual U.S. withdrawal—the first major figure in the U.S. Democratic Party to openly oppose the Democratic president on the war. The speech drew a standing ovation, and reverberated nationwide, drawing national media and political attention, and initiating the Democratic Party's gradual split over the war.

==== Labor legislation ====
On labor legislation, however, Udall was less liberal. Though he opposed right-to-work laws that undermined labor unions, his constituents very strongly supported them, so Udall did, too—particularly in a 1965 congressional vote that labor leaders held against him for years.

==== Conservation and the environment ====
On conservation and environmental protection, Udall's record was mixed—and extreme in both directions—though he is largely credited with being generally a defender of those causes (he first joined the House Interior committee in 1961), particularly as chairman of the House Committee on Interior and Insular Affairs. He fought for environmental protection, and expansion of the National Park System, ushered legislation through Congress absorbing 8 million acres into the federal wilderness system across 20 states, and attempted to restructure the energy industry.

An important exception was his defense of planned dam-and-reservoir projects in Arizona that threatened to inundate key wilderness areas, including a hydroelectric dam that threatened to flood some of the Grand Canyon. Hostile campaigning by the nation's leading conservation organization, the Sierra Club, led to Udall's bitter fight with them, and the eventual loss of their tax-exempt status, which some have blamed on Udall's complaints about them to the Internal Revenue Service. The projects were eventually abandoned, replaced with coal-fired powerplants that Udall thought more polluting than the dams would have been.

However, in the opposite extreme, Udall's "proudest achievement" was passage of an Alaska lands bill, permanently preserving 104.3 million acres of wilderness, over the opposition of many in Alaska and in the natural resource industries.

In 1973, Udall was named "Legislator of the Year" by the National Wildlife Federation.

However, in 1974, his Land Use Bill was defeated—some environmentalists blaming Udall's inability to work the bill effectively on the floor of the House.

From the beginning of his work on the Interior committee in 1961, Udall had been interested in limiting the controversial practice of strip mining, blamed for massive destruction of wilderness and extensive environmental damage, particularly across the American West. However, it took several years of wrangling with industry, Congress and administrations (Republican President Gerald R. Ford vetoed the legislation twice), before he was able to pass a limited bill, into law (signed by Democratic President Jimmy Carter), which constrained the strip-mining of coal, and forced the reclamation of millions of acres of strip-mined areas.

Udall helped write and pass the Alaska Lands Act of 1980, and landmark 1982 legislation addressing nuclear waste management.

Udall voted for the Abandoned Shipwrecks Act of 1987. The Act asserts United States title to certain abandoned shipwrecks located on or embedded in submerged lands under state jurisdiction, and transfers title to the respective state, thereby empowering states to manage these cultural and historical resources more efficiently, with the goal of preventing treasure hunters and salvagers from damaging them. President Ronald Reagan signed it into law on April 28, 1988.

==== Government legislative reform ====
Udall challenged the arcane and Byzantine rules and protocols of the House of Representatives, demanding a reduction in the ability of powerful leaders to covertly control legislation and dominate committees. Udall's efforts eventually led to substantial reform of congressional rules and operations.

Udall gained early national political notoriety for being the first congressman in the 20th century to challenge a sitting Speaker of the House for his seat. He challenged Rep. John McCormack, in 1968. Though defeated, Udall tried again two years later, against House Majority Leader, Hale Boggs; he lost again but shook the foundations of the House seniority system. This was eventually reformed, largely as a result of the revolt begun by Udall.

Like any freshman congressman, Udall struggled to adapt to the office during his first term; but in his second term, he responded to the experience by organizing a school for other incoming freshmen congressman, to teach them the complex and subtle ways of the House of Representatives, and how to navigate the Washington bureaucracy. To aid this effort, Udall wrote a 1966 guidebook, The Job of a Congressman.

==== Government campaign reform ====
Udall co-sponsored the Federal Election Campaign Act of 1971 and was a key factor in its success. The first major campaign-finance reform legislation since 1925, it required candidates to file campaign finance reports. (President Richard Nixon ran afoul of these requirements in actions related to the Watergate scandal). Udall also co-sponsored the 1974 Campaign Reform Act, which was signed by President Ford. He fought for financial disclosure legislation, and disclosed his own finances and tax returns.

==== Government administrative reform ====
Reforming civil service and the U.S. Post Office were a major focus of Udall's efforts in Congress. On the Committee of the Post Office and Civil Service since 1961, he eventually became the ranking member. He attempted to revise pay scales for federal employees and establish merit pay.

Ultimately, Udall was one of the principal leaders effecting the first substantial reform of the U.S. civil service system since the 1883 creation of that merit-based government-employment system. The bill created performance incentives for workers in the bureaucracy, and made firing federal workers easier. Although the bill was a favorite project of President Carter, whom Udall disliked, the congressman pushed the bill through Congress, against numerous roadblocks thrown up by federal employees (and by congressmen representing districts that employed many of them). Udall compromised until getting a consensus bill before the whole House, fighting through additional opposition to success.

Udall sought to change the Post Office Department from a purely governmental agency into a semiprivate organization (today, it is: the U.S. Postal Service). He was a key force in passage of the Postal Reorganization Act of 1970.

==== Other issues ====
Because of having lost his eye as a child due to inadequate family finances, he strongly believed that people should have access to competent medical care regardless of their financial condition.

In 1963, Udall attempted to get cigarettes (and other tobacco) regulated by the Food and Drug Administration (FDA). It took years before the scale of tobacco damage due to smoking was known.

On the House Foreign Affairs Committee, Udall opposed Reagan administration policies toward Central America.

=== Presidential campaign ===
In 1976, Udall ran for the Democratic nomination for President as a liberal alternative to Jimmy Carter, the former Governor of Georgia. Carter had gone from obscure maverick to front runner after a string of early caucus and primary victories, beginning in Iowa and New Hampshire. At the time of the Wisconsin primary in April, most of the original 10 candidates had dropped out, leaving Udall, Senator Henry "Scoop" Jackson of Washington, Governor George Wallace of Alabama, and Carter. It appeared that Udall would win the primary, which might have slowed Carter's momentum. Udall was projected the winner, exclaiming "Oh, how sweet it is". But Carter eventually won in Wisconsin.

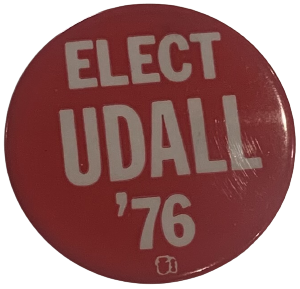
A campaign button from Udall's 1976 run for President

Some newspapers proclaimed Udall the winner because of his lead late the night before.

Carter won in Wisconsin by 1%, no more than 7,500 votes. He won 37% to Udall's 36%, gaining one more convention delegate than Udall. Despite the small margins, Carter got the headlines and a further boost to his momentum and pulled away from Udall and the other candidates. Udall finished second in the New Hampshire, Massachusetts, Wisconsin, New York, Michigan, South Dakota, and Ohio primaries, and won the caucuses in his home state of Arizona, while running even with Carter in the New Mexico caucuses. Udall finished a distant second to Carter at the Democratic National Convention, where his name was placed in nomination by Archibald Cox, and Udall's speech received great applause from his supporters.

During the Michigan primary Coleman Young, the mayor of Detroit, accused Udall of racism for belonging to the LDS church. At the time, it still prohibited blacks from serving in the church's priesthood (this was changed in 1978 by LDS Church President Spencer W. Kimball). Udall had been a longtime critic of that church policy, and had ceased being an active member because of it. Carter's subsequent sweeping of the black vote in the Michigan primary was key to his crucial and narrow victory in Michigan.

Udall supported Senator Edward Kennedy's challenge to President Carter in 1980, and Kennedy won the Arizona caucuses, one of only three wins for Kennedy in the West. Udall delivered the keynote speech at the 1980 Democratic National Convention. He considered running for president again in 1984, but he had been diagnosed with Parkinson's disease in 1979 and his illness kept him on the sidelines. At the convention that summer, Udall introduced his former opponent, President Carter.

== Legacy ==
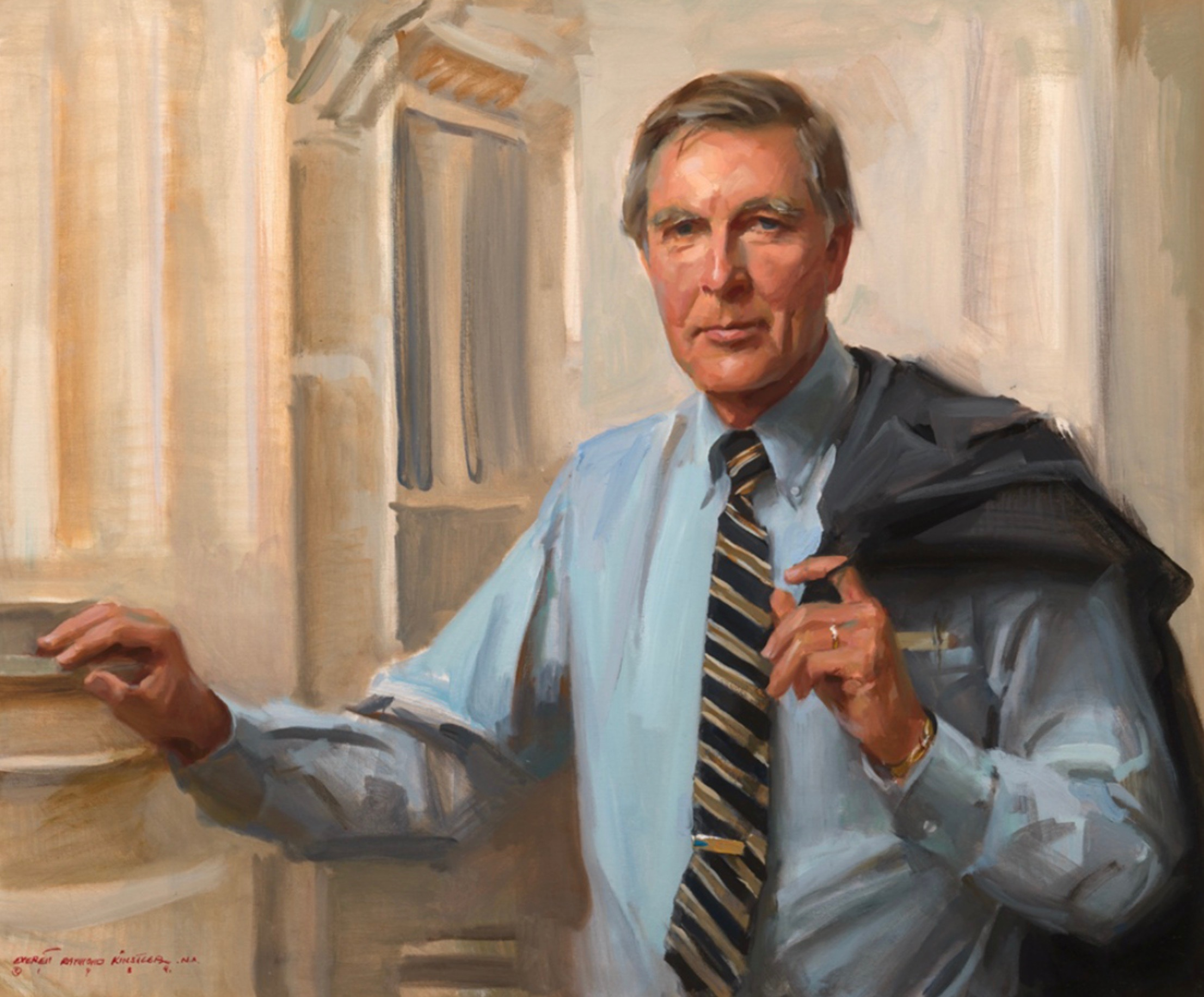
Udall's official House portrait

In 1992, the US Congress founded the Morris K. Udall Scholarship and Excellence in National Environmental Policy Foundation. It is an agency of the executive branch of the federal government, and among other functions, gives scholarships to students of environmental policy. In 2009, Congress added Mo's brother, Stewart Udall, as an honoree of the foundation by renaming it as the Morris K. Udall and Stewart L. Udall Foundation.

Federal funds for Parkinson's research are designated through the Morris K. Udall Parkinson's Disease Research Act of 1997. The legislation funded a national network of "Centers of Excellence" to diagnose and treat Parkinson disease patients and to refer patients into research protocols.

In 1996 Udall received the Presidential Medal of Freedom from President Clinton.

Point Udall on Guam, considered the westernmost point of the United States, was named for him in 1987. The easternmost spot, Point Udall, U.S. Virgin Islands, was named for his brother Stewart in 1968. This means that "America's day ... begin(s) and end(s) at a Point Udall."

In Tucson, Arizona, the main post office was named in his honor in 2007 as well as a local park.

== Personal life ==
Udall was married three times. In 1949, he married Patricia "Pat" Emery, with whom he had six children. Patricia, who hated politics, had arthritis and spent much time in a wheelchair. She and Udall rarely saw each other due to his hectic political schedule. By Mo Udall's own account, Pat had become unsatisfied with her life caused by her illnesses and disinterest in politics. She was also a high-spirited person who had a tendency to frequently start arguments.

Pat Udall struggled emotionally due to the strain of raising six children while struggling with arthritis. Unwilling to undergo psychological counseling due to social stigma, she finally acquiesced and filed for divorce in 1966. Mo Udall, who was opposed to the divorce, did not object to the dissolution of the marriage, mainly because he was more focused on politics than on his family.

Both the Udalls later regretted the divorce, explaining that the marriage ended because Pat had failed to get counseling or help and had simply acquiesced to pressure and made a poor impulse decision. Pat Udall herself stated that she was "ashamed" by her decision to end the marriage. Pat went on to marry and divorce three more times in the seven years following her split from Udall, all of which were brief marriages that she later regretted. Mo and Pat eventually reconciled, and they remained close friends for the rest of his life.

Two years after the divorce, Mo Udall married Ella Lee Royston, a marriage that would last until Royston's suicide in 1988. In 1989, he married his third wife, Norma Gilbert, and they remained together until his death in 1998. His years in retirement were plagued by Parkinson's disease.

Udall's son Mark Udall was elected to the U.S. Congress from Colorado's 2nd district in 1998, and to the U.S. Senate in 2008. His nephew Tom Udall of New Mexico was also elected to the U.S. Senate in 2008. Mo Udall's second cousin, Republican Senator Gordon Smith of Oregon, was defeated for re-election the same year.

== Books and archives ==
With the exception of Udall's first book, his books have been described as "humorous and informative works."

- Arizona Law of Evidence (1960).
- The Job of a Congressman (1966) – a guidebook for freshmen Congressmen.
- Education of a Congressman (1972).
- Too Funny to Be President (1988) — his autobiography.

Udall's archives of his professional career and personal life are located the University of Arizona Libraries, Special Collections in Tucson, Arizona.

- MS 325 Papers of Morris K. Udall, 1920–1995

UAL Special Collections is also home to the Morris K. Udall Oral History Project, MS 396 that includes interviews from former Presidents, former and current Congressmen, Senators, journalists, key staff members, campaign aides, family and friends of Mo Udall and the Udall family.

== See also ==
- Udall family
- Lee-Hamblin family
- List of members of the American Legion
- List of American sportsperson-politicians
- 1948–49 Denver Nuggets season

U.S. House of Representatives
Preceded by Stewart Udall	Member of the U.S. House of Representatives from Arizona's 2nd congressional district 1961–1991	Succeeded by Ed Pastor
Political offices
Preceded by James A. Haley	Chair of the House Interior Committee; 1977–1991	Succeeded by George Miller
Party political offices
Preceded by John Glenn; Barbara Jordan	Keynote Speaker at the Democratic National Convention; 1980	Succeeded by Mario Cuomo
