= Peaked Island (Alaska) =

Uninhabited island in the Aleutian Islands, Alaska, U.S.

- Location within Alaska

Geography
- Location: Bering Sea
- Coordinates: 52°55′20″N 172°26′35″E

Administration
- United States

Peaked Island is an uninhabited island located in the Aleutian Islands chain in Alaska. It is the westernmost point in the 50 states by direction of travel, and last sunset (at equinox) in U.S. territory. West of it passes the International Date Line, after which come Russian territorial islands.

== See also ==
- List of extreme points of the United States
