= List of extreme points of the United States =

This is a list of points in the United States that are farther north, south, east or west than any other location in the country. Also included are extreme points in elevation, extreme distances and other points of peculiar geographic interest.

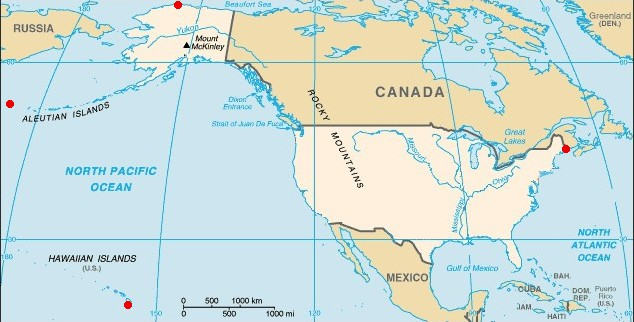
Extreme points in the 50 states (clockwise from left): Peaked Island, AK; Point Barrow, AK; Sail Rock, ME; Ka Lae, HI

Extreme points in the contiguous 48 states (clockwise from top left): Bodelteh Islands, WA; Northwest Angle, MN; Sail Rock, ME; Ballast Key, FL

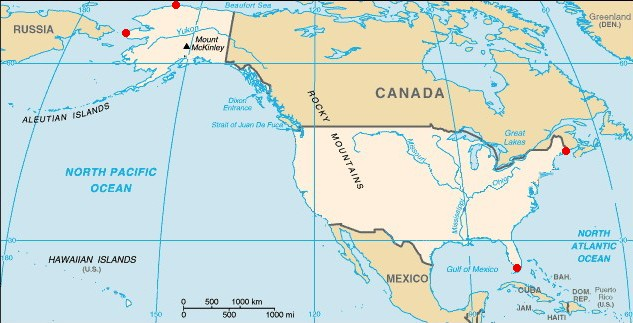
Extreme points of the U.S. on the North American continent (clockwise from left): Cape Prince of Wales, AK; Point Barrow, AK; West Quoddy Head, ME; Cape Sable, FL

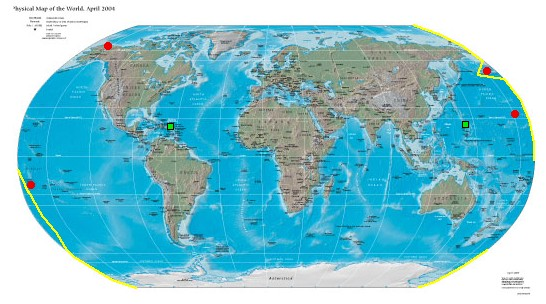
Extreme points in all U.S. territory (clockwise from lower left): Rose Atoll, American Samoa; Point Barrow, AK; Peaked Island, AK; Wake Island (red dots); Point Udall, USVI (left) and Point Udall, Guam (right) are shown as green dots. The International Date Line is shown in yellow.

== Northernmost points ==
- Point Barrow, Alaska 71°23′20″N 156°28′45″W – northernmost point in the United States
- Utqiaġvik, Alaska 71°17′44″N 156°45′59″W – northernmost incorporated place in all U.S. territory, population about 5,000
- Fairbanks, Alaska 64°50′22.94″N 147°43′14.63″W – northernmost city of more than 20,000 residents
- Anchorage, Alaska 61°13′4.17″N 149°53′33.17″W – northernmost city of more than 100,000 residents
- Juneau, Alaska 58.299104°N 134.420240°W – northernmost capital city in the United States
- Northwest Angle Inlet in Lake of the Woods, Minnesota 49°23′04.08″N 95°9′12.16″W – northernmost point in the 48 contiguous states (Note: Historical landmark buoy of Northernmost Point in the Contiguous US is placed in Youngs Bay, 8.7 miles (14 km) to the east 49°20′42.36″N 94°58′11.09″W.)
- Sumas, Washington 49°00′08.6″N 122°15′40″W – northernmost incorporated place in the 48 contiguous states
- Lynden, Washington 48°56′43″N 122°27′10″W – northernmost city of more than 10,000 residents in the 48 contiguous states
- Bellingham, Washington 48°45′19.12″N 122°28′43.54″W – northernmost city of more than 50,000 residents in the 48 contiguous states
- Everett, Washington 47°58′41″N 122°12′27″W – northernmost city of more than 100,000 residents in the 48 contiguous states
- Spokane, Washington 47°39′37″N 117°25′25″W – northernmost city of more than 200,000 residents in the 48 contiguous states
- Seattle, Washington 47°36′13.81″N 122°19′48.56″W – northernmost city of more than 500,000 residents in the United States
- Olympia, Washington 47°2′16″N 122°54′3″W – northernmost capital city in the 48 contiguous states
- Chicago, Illinois 41°53′1.9″N 87°37′53.87″W – northernmost city of more than 1,000,000 residents in the United States
- Alaska has the northernmost geographic center of all the states. North Dakota has the northernmost geographic center of the 48 contiguous states.

== Southernmost points ==
- Rose Atoll, American Samoa 14°34′11″S 168°9′10″W – southernmost point in the United States
- Futiga, American Samoa 14.372987°S 170.759741°W – southernmost town in the United States
- Pago Pago, American Samoa 14.273821°S 170.701265°W – southernmost capital city in the United States
- Palmyra Atoll, U.S. Minor Outlying Islands 5°53′2″N 162°4′42″W – southernmost point in all U.S. incorporated territory
- San Juan, Puerto Rico 18°27′56″N 66°6′21″W – southernmost city of more than 250,000 residents in all U.S. territory
- Ka Lae, Hawaii 18°54′39″N 155°40′52″W – southernmost point in the 50 states
- Discovery Harbour, Hawaii 19°02′3″N 155°37′49″W - southernmost settlement in the 50 states
- Nā'ālehu, Hawaii 19°3′57″N 155°35′15″W – southernmost town in the 50 states
- Hilo, Hawaii 19°41′58″N 155°4′51″W – southernmost place with a population over 25,000 in the 50 states
- Honolulu, Hawaii 21°18′19″N 157°51′25″W – southernmost U.S. state capital and southernmost incorporated place in the 50 states (Hawaii's only incorporated place)
- Western Dry Rocks, Florida Keys, Florida 24°26.8′N 81°55.6′W – southernmost point in the 48 contiguous states occasionally above water at low tide
- Ballast Key, Florida 24°31′15″N 81°57′49″W – southernmost point in the 48 contiguous states continuously above water
- Key West, Florida 24°32′38.724″N 81°48′17.658″W – southernmost incorporated place in the contiguous 48 states
- Cape Sable, Florida 25°7′6″N 81°5′11″W – southernmost point on the U.S. mainland
- Florida City, Florida 25°26′54″N 80°28′57″W – southernmost municipality in the contiguous U.S.
- Miami, Florida 25°43′40″N 80°14′2″W – southernmost major metropolitan city in the 48 contiguous states
- Cameron County, Texas 25°50′14.5″N 97°23′39.9″W – southernmost point on the Mexico–United States border.
- San Antonio, Texas 29.4724°N 98.5251°W – southernmost city of more than 1,000,000 residents in the United States
- Austin, Texas 30°16′2″N 97°44′35″W – southernmost capital city in the 48 contiguous states
- Hawaii has the southernmost geographic center of all the states. Florida has the southernmost geographic center of the 48 contiguous states.

== Easternmost points ==
- Point Udall, St. Croix, U.S. Virgin Islands 17°45′19″N 64°33′54″W – easternmost point in the United States, by direction of travel
- Christiansted, U.S. Virgin Islands 17.7482°N 64.7168°W – easternmost town in the United States, by direction of travel
- Charlotte Amalie, U.S. Virgin Islands 18.340688°N 64.931065°W – easternmost capital city in the United States, by direction of travel
- San Juan, Puerto Rico 18.4655°N 66.1057°W – easternmost major city of more than 250,000 residents in all U.S. territory
- Sail Rock, Lubec, Maine 44°48′45.2″N 66°56′49.3″W – easternmost point in the 50 states, by direction of travel and easternmost incorporated place in the 50 states
- West Quoddy Head, Maine 44°48′55.4″N 66°56′59.2″W – easternmost point on the U.S. mainland
- Bangor, Maine 44°49.3′N 68°43.1′W – easternmost city of more than 20,000 residents in the 50 states
- Augusta, Maine 44.307°N 69.782°W – easternmost U.S. state capital
- Portland, Maine 43°42.0′N 70°5.2′W – easternmost city of more than 50,000 residents in the 50 states
- New Bedford, Massachusetts 41°38′10″N 70°56′05″W – easternmost city of more than 100,000 residents in the 50 states
- Boston, Massachusetts 42.3320°N 71.0202°W – easternmost city of more than 500,000 residents in the United States
- New York City, New York 40.6635°N 73.9387°W – easternmost city of more than 1,000,000 residents in the United States
- Pochnoi Point, Semisopochnoi Island, Alaska 51°57′42″N 179°46′23″E – easternmost point in all U.S. territory by longitude
- Peacock Point, Wake Island 19°16′13.2″N 166°39′26.3″E – first sunrise (at equinox) in all U.S. territory
- Northern Islands Municipality, Northern Mariana Islands 16.0271°N 146.0645°E – easternmost municipality in all U.S. territory, by longitude
- Saipan, Northern Mariana Islands 15°11′N 145°45′E – easternmost capital city in the United States, by longitude
- Maine has the easternmost geographic center of the 50 states.
- Diomede, Alaska, Little Diomede Island 65°45.5′N 168°57.2′W - closest town to Russia (via the Russian island of Big Diomede)

== Westernmost points ==
- Point Udall, Santa Rita, Guam (13°26′51″N 144°37′5.5″E) – westernmost point and westernmost town in the United States, by direction of travel
- Hagåtña, Guam 13.477264°N 144.747249°E – westernmost capital city in the United States, by direction of travel
- Peaked Island, offshore from Cape Wrangell, Attu Island, Alaska 52°55′14″N 172°26′16″E – westernmost point in the 50 states by direction of travel, and last sunset (at equinox) in all U.S. territories. West of it passes the International Date Line, after which come Russian territorial islands.
- Amatignak Island, Alaska 51°16′7″N 179°8′55″W – westernmost point in all U.S. territories by longitude
- Adak, Alaska 51.8224°N 176.7147°W – westernmost incorporated city in the 50 states
- Pago Pago, American Samoa 14°16′46″S 170°42′2″W – westernmost capital city in the United States, by longitude
- Cape Prince of Wales, Alaska 65°38′32″N 168°7′8″W – westernmost point on the North American continent
- Unalaska, Alaska 53.888984°N 166.527239°W – westernmost city of more than 2,500 residents in the 50 states
- Honolulu, Hawaii 21°18′25″N 157°51′30″W – westernmost U.S. state capital
- Anchor Point, Alaska (59°46′20.8914″N 151°52′2.373″W) – westernmost point on the continuous road system of North America
- Umatilla Reef, offshore from Cape Alava, Washington 48°11.1′N 124°47.1′W – westernmost point in the 48 contiguous states occasionally above water at low tide
- Bodelteh Islands, offshore from Cape Alava, Washington 48°10′42.7″N 124°46′18.1″W – westernmost point in the 48 contiguous states continuously above water
- Cape Alava, Washington 48°9′51″N 124°43′59″W – westernmost point on the U.S. mainland (contiguous)
- Neah Bay, Washington 48°21′56″N 124°36′56″W – westernmost town in the 48 contiguous states
- Port Orford, Oregon 42.754065°N 124.512605°W – westernmost incorporated place in the 48 contiguous states
- Brookings, Oregon 42.0553°N 124.2875°W – westernmost city of more than 5,000 residents in the 48 contiguous states
- Coos Bay, Oregon 43.3681°N 124.2174°W – westernmost city of more than 10,000 residents in the 48 contiguous states
- Eureka, California 40°46.3′N 124°12.2′W – westernmost city of more than 25,000 residents in the 48 contiguous states
- Corvallis, Oregon 44°32.6′N 123°20.2′W – westernmost city of more than 50,000 residents in the 48 contiguous states
- Eugene, Oregon 44°05.1′N 123°12.5′W – westernmost city of more than 100,000 residents in the 48 contiguous states
- Salem, Oregon 44°56′21″N 123°2′22″W – westernmost capital city in the 48 contiguous states
- Portland, Oregon 45°35.5′N 122°50.2′W – westernmost city of more than 500,000 residents in the United States
- San Jose, California 37°26.9′N 122°2.8′W – westernmost city of more than 1,000,000 residents in the United States
- Hawaii has the westernmost geographic center of all the states. Oregon has the westernmost geographic center of the 48 contiguous states.
- Diomede, Alaska, Little Diomede Island 65°45.5′N 168°57.2′W - closest town to Russia Big Diomede

== Interpretation of easternmost and westernmost ==
There are three methods for reckoning the eastern and western extremes of the United States.

One method is to use the Prime Meridian as the dividing line between east and west. This meridian running through Greenwich, London, is defined as zero degrees longitude and could be called the least eastern and least western place in the world. The 180th meridian, on the opposite side of the globe, is therefore the easternmost and westernmost place in the world.

Another method is to use the International Date Line as the easternmost–westernmost extreme. On the equinox, the easternmost place would be where the day first begins, and the westernmost is where the day last ends.

Still another method is to first determine the geographic center of the country and from there measure the shortest distance to every other point. All U.S. territory is spread across less than 180° of longitude, so from any spot in the U.S. it is more direct to reach the easternmost point, Point Udall, U.S. Virgin Islands, by traveling east than by traveling west. Likewise, there is not a single point in U.S. territory from which heading east is a shorter route to the westernmost point, Point Udall, Guam, than heading west would be, even accounting for circumpolar routes. The two different Point Udalls are named for two different men: Mo Udall (Guam) and Stewart Udall (Virgin Islands), brothers from the Udall family of Arizona who both served as U.S. Congressmen.

== Highest points ==
- Denali, Alaska 63°4′9″N 151°0′23″W – highest summit in the United States, all US territories, and North America at 20,310 feet (6,190.5 m) (federally designated as Mount McKinley from 1917 to 2015 and again from 2025)
- Mount Whitney, (Note: The summit elevation of Mount Whitney includes an adjustment of +1.869 m (+6.1 ft) from NGVD 29 to NAVD 88.) California 36°34′43″N 118°17′31″W – highest point in the 48 contiguous states at 14,505 feet (4,421 m)
- Grays Peak, Colorado 39°38′1″N 105°49′3″W – highest point on the Continental Divide of North America at 14,270 feet (4,350 m)
- Mauna Kea, Hawaiʻi 19°49′14″N 155°28′5″W – highest island summit in all U.S. territory and the entire Pacific Ocean at 13,796 feet (4,205 m)
- Taos Ski Valley, New Mexico 36°35′52″N 105°26′42″W – highest village limits in all U.S. territory at 12,581 feet (3,835 m) (No residents of Taos Ski Valley live above 10,350 feet (3,150 m))
- Winter Park, Colorado 39°53′34″N 105°45′43″W – highest city limits in all U.S. territory at 12,060 feet (3,680 m) (No residents of Winter Park live above 9,550 feet (2,910 m))
- San Juan County, Colorado 37°49′N 107°40′W – highest U.S. county based on a mean elevation (11,240 feet (3,430 m))
- Alma, Colorado 39°17′2″N 106°3′46″W – highest town in all U.S. territory at 10,355 feet (3,156 m); contiguous residential areas extend to 11,680 feet (3,560 m).
- Leadville, Colorado 39°14′50″N 106°17′30″W – highest city in all U.S. territory at 10,152 feet (3,094 m). (No residents of Leadville live above 10,360 feet (3,160 m))
- Woodland Park, Colorado 38°59′54″N 105°3′23″W – highest city of more than 5,000 residents in all U.S. territory at 8,465 feet (2,580 m).
- Laramie, Wyoming 41°18′40″N 105°35′37″W – highest city of more than 10,000 residents in all U.S. territory at 7,165 feet (2,184 m).
- Santa Fe, New Mexico 35°40′2″N 105°57′52″W – highest city of more than 50,000 residents and highest capital city in all U.S. territory at 6,989 feet (2,130 m).
- Colorado Springs, Colorado 38°50′2″N 104°49′31″W – highest city of more than 100,000 residents in all U.S. territory at 6,035 feet (1,839 m).
- Albuquerque, New Mexico 35°05′02″N 106°39′04″W – highest major city of more than 500,000 residents in all U.S. territory at 5,312 feet (1,619 m).
- Phoenix, Arizona 33°26′54″N 112°4′26″W – highest major city of more than 1,000,000 residents in all U.S. territory at 1,085 feet (331 m).
- Lake County Airport, Colorado 39°13′13″N 106°19′00″W – highest airfield in all U.S. territory and North America at 9,927 feet (3,026 m)
- New Mexico State Capitol, Santa Fe 35°40′56″N 105°56′23″W – highest state capitol in the United States at 7,005 feet (2,135 m)
- Colorado 39°00′N 105°30′W – highest U.S. state based on an average elevation of 6,800 feet (2,100 m)
- Mount Mitchell, North Carolina 35°45′53″N 82°15′54″W – highest point in eastern United States at 6,684 feet (2,037 m)
- Mount Washington, New Hampshire 44°16′13″N 71°18′12″W – highest point in northeastern United States at 6,288 feet (1,917 m)
- Arikaree River, Yuma County, Colorado at Kansas state line 39°58′42″N 102°3′6″W – highest U.S. state low point at 3,317 feet (1,011 m)
- Beech Mountain, North Carolina 36°12′23″N 81°52′59″W – highest incorporated community east of the Mississippi River at an elevation of 5,506 feet (1,678 m).
- Boone, North Carolina 36°12′41″N 81°40′7″W – highest elevation (3,333 feet, 1015.9 m) east of the Mississippi River of any town of its size (over 10,000 population).
- Eisenhower Tunnel, west of Denver, Colorado 39.6785°N 105.92°W – highest point on the Interstate Highway System, at 11,158 feet (3,401 m).

== Lowest points ==
- Badwater Basin, Death Valley, California, 36°14′23″N 116°50′5″W – lowest surface point in all U.S. territory and North America, at −279 feet (−85 m)
- Salton Sea, California, 33°19′59″N 115°50′3″W – lowest lake in all U.S. territory and North America, at −226 feet (−69 m)
- Furnace Creek Airport, California 36°27′50″N 116°52′53″W – lowest airfield in all U.S. territory and Western Hemisphere, at −210 feet (−64 m)
- Furnace Creek, California, (Note: Furnace Creek, in Death Valley, California, set the world record for the highest reliably reported ambient air temperature of 134 °F (57 °C), on July 10, 1913. This record has been eclipsed only once, by a questionable reading of 136 °F (58 °C), recorded in 'Aziziya, Libya, on September 13, 1922.) 36°27′29″N 116°52′15″W – lowest settlement in all U.S. territory and Western Hemisphere, at −190 feet (−58 m)
- Calipatria, California, 33°07′32″N 115°30′51″W – lowest city in all U.S. territory and Western Hemisphere, at −184 feet (−56 m)
- 9th Ward of New Orleans, Louisiana, 30°02′40″N 89°56′47″W – lowest surface point in eastern United States, at −7 feet (−2.1 m)
- New Orleans, Louisiana, 29°58′N 90°03′W – lowest city over 250,000 population in all U.S. territory and Western Hemisphere, with an average elevation of −1.5 feet (−0.46 m)
- Delaware 39°0′17″N 75°32′46″W – lowest state, with an average elevation of 60 feet (18 m)
- Britton Hill, Florida, 30°59′18″N 86°16′55″W – lowest state high point, at 345 feet (105 m)
- Lake Superior bottom, Michigan, 46°54′31″N 86°35′52″W – lowest freshwater point in all U.S. territory, at −732 feet (−223 m) (Note: Sounding at 46° 54' 31"N, 86° 35' 52"W, on NOAA chart 14963, Grand Marais to Big Bay Point, scale 1:120,000, 2006. Chart datum (as shown on the chart) is 601.1 feet above mean sea level, at Rimouski, Quebec.)
- Puget Sound bottom, Washington, 47°44.9′N 122°25.7′W – lowest seawater point in the interior of the United States, at −956 feet (−291 m) (Note: Two identical soundings at 47° 45.2'N, 122° 26.0'W, and 47° 44.6'N, 122° 25.4'W, on NOAA chart 18446, Puget Sound: Apple Cove Point to Keyport, scale 1:25,000, 2005. Chart datum (as shown on the chart) is lower low water.)

== Other points ==
- Geographic center of the 50 states: approximately 20 miles (32 km) north of Belle Fourche, South Dakota, 44°58′N 103°46′W
- Geographic center of the 48 contiguous states: approximately 4 miles (6.4 km) west of Lebanon, Kansas, 39°50′N 98°35′W
- The geographic center of North America is at 48°10′N 100°10′W, about 6 miles (10 km) west of Balta, in Pierce County, North Dakota.
- Closest to the equator: Baker Island is at 0°11′41″N 176°28′46″W.
- Most remote point in the 50 states: Ipnavik River, National Petroleum Reserve–Alaska, 68°45′N 156°41′W; 120 miles (190 km) from nearest habitation.
- The North American pole of inaccessibility (distant from ocean access) is at 43°22′N 101°58′W, about 11 miles (18 km) southeast of the town of Kyle, on the Pine Ridge Indian Reservation, in Bennett County, South Dakota, 1,025 miles (1,650 km) from the nearest coastline.
- The southwesternmost point of the contiguous United States is Border Field State Park, California.
- The northwesternmost point of the contiguous United States is Cape Flattery, Washington.
- The northeasternmost point of the contiguous United States is Van Buren, Maine, 47°14.140′N 68°01.233′W

== Islands ==
- Island of Hawaiʻi, Hawaiʻi 19°49′15″N 155°28′5″W – most extensive island in all U.S. territory at 4,028 square miles (10,430 km^{2}) and tallest island in all U.S. territory and the entire Pacific Ocean at 13,796 feet (4,205 m).
- Kodiak Island, Alaska 57°28′N 153°26′W – most extensive Gulf of Alaska island at 3,595.09 square miles (9,311.2 km^{2}).
- Island of Puerto Rico, Puerto Rico 18°15′N 66°30′W – most extensive island of U.S. Caribbean territory at 3,515.1 square miles (9,104 km^{2}).
- Prince of Wales Island, Alaska 55°37′55″N 132°54′27″W – most extensive island of the Alexander Archipelago at 2,577 square miles (6,670 km^{2}).
- Saint Lawrence Island, Alaska 63°24′54″N 170°23′58″W – most extensive Bering Sea island at 1,791.56 square miles (4,640.1 km^{2}).
- Unimak Island, Alaska 54°46′6″N 164°11′12″W – most extensive Aleutian island at 1,571.41 square miles (4,069.9 km^{2}).
- Long Island, New York 40°52′10″N 73°00′00″W – most extensive island of the U.S. Atlantic coast at 1,401 square miles (3,630 km^{2}).
- Padre Island, Texas 26°50′40″N 97°22′04″W – most extensive Gulf of Mexico island at 209 square miles (540 km^{2}) and longest barrier island on Earth at 113 miles (182 km).
- Isle Royale in Lake Superior, Michigan 48°0′N 88°55′W – most extensive island in a lake in all U.S. territory at 206.73 square miles (535.4 km^{2}).
- Whidbey Island, Washington 48°8′11″N 122°34′57″W – most extensive island of Puget Sound at 168.67 square miles (436.9 km^{2}).
- Santa Cruz Island, California 34°0′13″N 119°43′35″W – most extensive of the Channel Islands of California at 97 square miles (250 km^{2}).
- The most remote islands in the United States are within the U.S. Minor Outlying Islands (namely, islands such as Palmyra Atoll and Johnston Atoll).

== Lakes ==
- Lake Michigan-Huron 45°48′N 84°45′W – largest freshwater lake in the world by surface area, at 45,300 square miles (117,000 km^{2}), of which 31,507 square miles (81,600 km^{2}) is within the United States.
- Lake Superior 47°42′N 87°30′W – Lying along the Canada–United States border, it is the second largest freshwater lake in the world by surface area, at 31,700 sq mi (82,100 km^{2}), of which 20,600 square miles (53,350 km^{2}) is within the United States. It is also North America's largest lake by volume, at 2,900 cu mi (12,000 km^{3}); it is commonly called the largest lake by surface area when Lake Michigan and Lake Huron are not considered one lake.
- Great Salt Lake, Utah, 41°10′N 112°35′W – most extensive endorheic lake, at 1,700 square miles (4,400 km^{2}).
- Crater Lake, Oregon, 42°57′N 122°5′W – deepest lake, has an average depth of 1,943 feet (592 m).
- Pacific Tarn, Colorado, 39°25′11″N 106°07′11″W – Highest elevation lake at 13,420 feet (4,090 m).

== Rivers ==
- Mississippi River 29°9′4″N 89°15′12″W – most extensive river basin at 1,151,000 square miles (2,980,000 km^{2}).
- Mississippi-Missouri-Jefferson Rivers 29°9′4″N 89°15′12″W – longest river system at 3,902 miles (6,280 km).
- Missouri River 38°48′49″N 90°7′11″W – longest main stem river at 2,341 miles (3,767 km).
- Mississippi River 29°9′4″N 89°15′12″W – longest Gulf of Mexico main stem river at 2,202 miles (3,544 km).
- Yukon River 62°35′55″N 164°47′40″W – longest Bering Sea main stem river at 1,979 miles (3,185 km).
- Colorado River 31°48′57″N 114°48′22″W – longest Gulf of California main stem river at 1,450 miles (2,330 km).
- Columbia River 46°14′39″N 124°3′29″W – longest Pacific Ocean main stem river at 1,243 miles (2,000 km).
- Saint Lawrence River 49°40′N 64°30′W – longest Atlantic Ocean main stem river at 600 miles (970 km).
- Bear River 41°27′30″N 112°17′25″W – longest endorheic basin main stem river at 491 miles (790 km).

== Extreme distances ==
- Greatest distance between any two points in U.S. territory: 9,514 miles (15,311 km), from Point Udall, Guam, to Point Udall, St. Croix, U.S. Virgin Islands (formerly known as Orote Point and East Point, respectively).
- Greatest distance between any two points in the 50 United States: 5,859 miles (9,429 km), from Kure Atoll, Hawaii, to Log Point, Elliott Key, Florida.
- Greatest east–west distance in U.S. territory [?]: 5,823 miles (9,371 km), from Kure Atoll, Hawaii, to Riviera Beach, Florida.
- Greatest minimal driving distance between points in the contiguous 48 states (via U.S. highway system): 3,689 miles (5,937 km), from Fort Zachary Taylor, Key West, Florida, to Cape Flattery, Washington.
- Greatest distance between any two points in the contiguous 48 states: 2,901 miles (4,669 km), from North Farallon Island, California, to Sail Rock, east of West Quoddy Head, Maine.
- Greatest distance between any two mainland points in the contiguous 48 states: 2,892 miles (4,654 km), from Point Arena, California, to West Quoddy Head, Maine.
- Greatest east–west distance in the 48 contiguous states: 2,800 miles (4,500 km)
- Greatest north–south distance in the 48 contiguous states: 1,650 miles (2,660 km).

Some map projections make diagonal lines appear longer than they actually are. The diagonal line from Kure Atoll, Hawaii, to West Quoddy Head, Maine, is 5,797 miles (9,329 km); and the diagonal from Cape Wrangell, Attu Island, Alaska, to Log Point, on Elliott Key, Florida, is 5,505 miles (8,859 km).

== See also ==
- Borders of the United States
  - Border irregularities of the United States
- Geography of the United States
- Extreme points of the Earth
  - Extreme points of the Americas
    - Extreme points of North America
      - List of extreme points of Canada
        - Extreme points of Canadian provinces
        - Extreme communities of Canada
      - Extreme points of Greenland
      - List of extreme points of Mexico
      - Extreme points of the United States
        - List of extreme points of U.S. states and territories
        - Extreme points of New England
      - Extreme points of Central America
      - Extreme points of the Caribbean
        - Extreme points of Cuba
    - Extreme points of South America
