= Point Udall (U.S. Virgin Islands) =

Easternmost point in the United States by travel

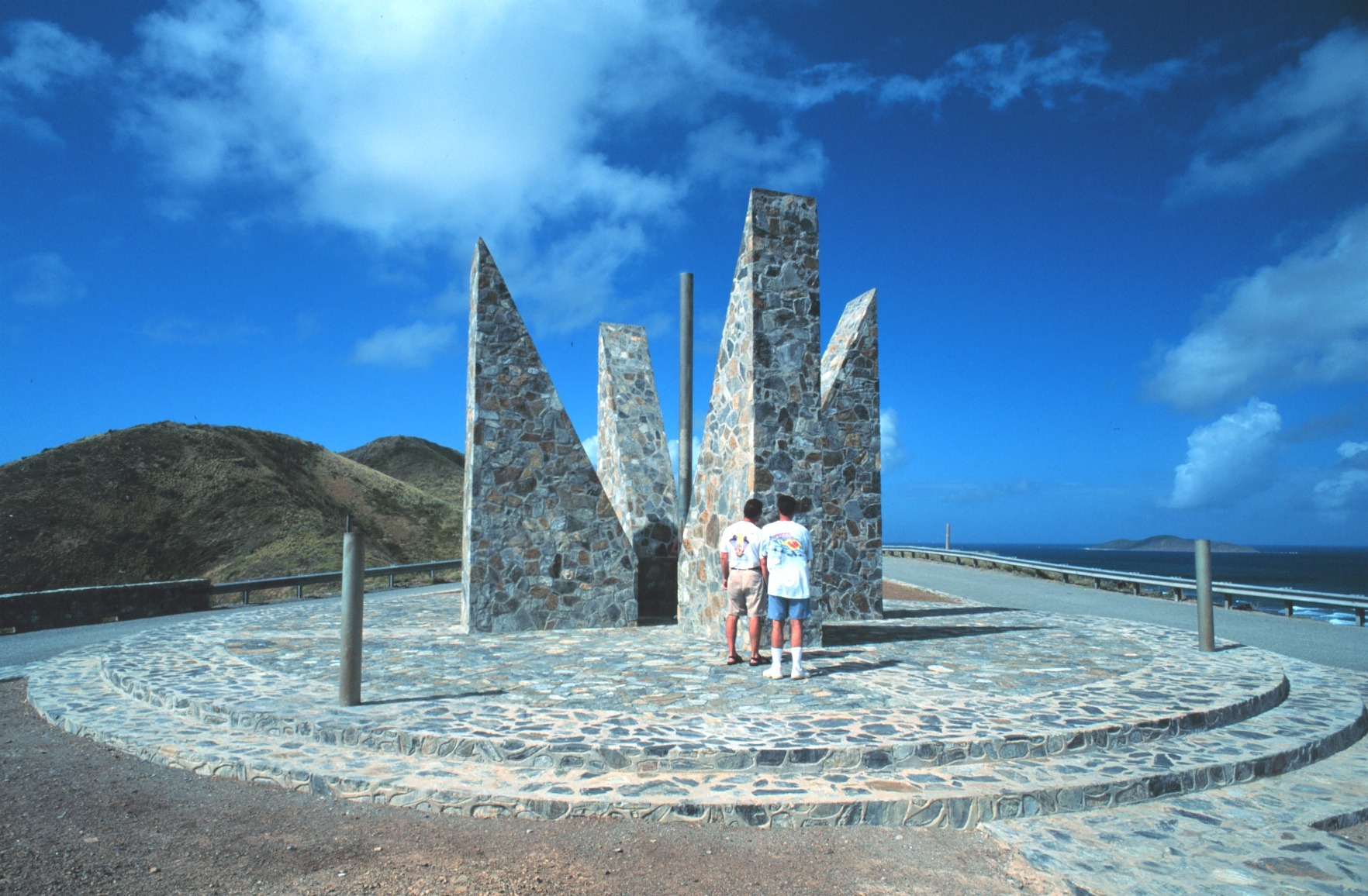
- Point Udall Millennium Monument

- Location within Saint Croix, U.S. Virgin Islands Location within the U.S. Virgin Islands
- 17°45′21″N 64°34′01″W

Point Udall is at the east end of St. Croix in the U.S. Virgin Islands. It is the easternmost point (by travel, not longitude) of the United States including insular areas. It was named in 1969 for Stewart Udall, United States Secretary of the Interior under Presidents John F. Kennedy and Lyndon Johnson.

A sundial known as the Millennium Monument was built above Point Udall for the New Year's celebration in 2000 — it marks the azimuth of the first U.S. sunrise of that year. From the monument an informal trail of moderate difficulty leads down to the point, which is composed primarily of uplifted and rotated volcanic and sedimentary rocks of Upper Cretaceous origin.

The westernmost point of the United States by travel, not longitude, which is in Guam, is also named Point Udall, in honor of Stewart's brother, Mo Udall. In a 1987 statement in regards to H.R. 2434, the legislation which led to the naming of the point in Guam, Denny Smith and Guam's nonvoting congressional delegate Ben Blaz said "If our legislation is approved, America's day would begin and end at a Point Udall."

When Mo Udall died in 1998, President Bill Clinton issued a statement saying in part, "It is fitting that the easternmost point of the United States, in the Virgin Islands, and the westernmost point, in Guam, are both named 'Udall Point.' The Sun will never set on the legacy of Mo Udall." This was also noted in the Congressional Record by Rep. George Miller of California.

== See also ==
- Extreme points of the United States
- Udall family
