= Point Udall (Guam) =

Point on the Orote Peninsula, Guam

Coordinates: 13°26′51.2″N 144°37′5.5″E

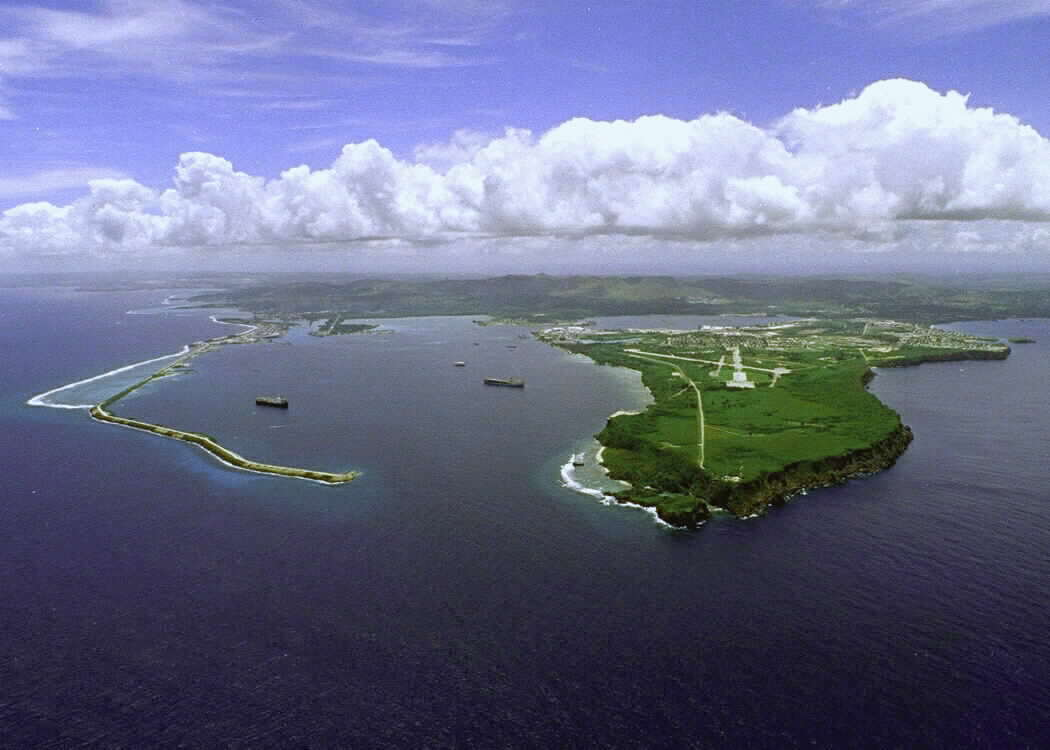
Point Udall (Orote Point) is the headland on the right in this view of Apra Harbor's mouth

Point Udall, also called Orote Point, is the westernmost point (by travel, not longitude) in the territorial United States, located on the Orote Peninsula of Guam. It lies at the mouth of Apra Harbor, on the end of Orote Peninsula, opposite the Glass Breakwater of Cabras Island which forms the northern coast of the harbor. Many sources still call it Orote Point, such as the US Military's Orote Point Lanes bowling alley. The NRHP-listed Orote Historical Complex is located at the point.

== Naming ==
The point is named for former Arizona congressman Morris "Mo" Udall. It was called Orote Point until it was renamed Point Udall in May 1987. Earlier that month, H.R. 2434, tabled by U.S. Congressman Denny Smith of Oregon, proposed renaming the point "to honor the service and accomplishments of Morris Udall." While the proposed resolution was referred to the House Subcommittee on Insular and International Affairs, the name was officially designated as Point Udall by Governor of Guam Joseph Franklin Ada later that month.

In 1968, the easternmost point in the United States, Point Udall, Virgin Islands, had been named for Udall's brother, Stewart. In a 1987 statement in regards to H.R. 2434, Congressman Smith and Guam's nonvoting congressional delegate Ben Blaz explained that "America's day would begin and end at a Point Udall." When Mo Udall died in 1998, President Bill Clinton issued a statement saying in part "It is fitting that the easternmost point of the United States, in the Virgin Islands, and the westernmost point, in Guam, are both named 'Udall Point.' The Sun will never set on the legacy of Mo Udall." This was also noted in the Congressional Record by Rep. George Miller of California.

== See also ==
- Extreme points of the United States
- Udall family
