= List of shipwrecks in May 1849 =

The list of shipwrecks in May 1849 includes ships sunk, foundered, grounded, or otherwise lost during May 1849.

== 1 May ==
List of shipwrecks: 1 May 1849
Ship	State	Description
Spencer	United Kingdom	The ship was wrecked on Sanda Island, Argyllshire. All on board were rescued. She was on a voyage from New Orleans, Louisiana, United States to Liverpool, Lancashire.

== 2 May ==
List of shipwrecks: 2 May 1849
Ship	State	Description
Actif	France	The ship was wrecked near Bône, Algeria. Her crew were rescued.
Amidée	France	The ship was wrecked near Key West, Florida, United States. She was on a voyage from Ciudad del Carmen, Mexico to Havre de Grâce, Seine-Inférieure.
Anna	United Kingdom	The brig ran aground 4 nautical miles (7.4 km) from Wismar. She was on a voyage from Neustadt in Holstein, Duchy of Holstein to London.
Favourite	France	The ship was driven ashore and sank at Manasquan, New Jersey, United States. Her crew were rescued. She was on a voyage from Saint-Malo, Ille-et-Vilaine to New York.
Mary Turcan	United Kingdom	The ship was driven ashore near St. James's Castle, Smyrna, Ottoman Empire. She was on a voyage from Smyrna to London. She was refloated on 5 May and resumed her voyage.

== 3 May ==
List of shipwrecks: 3 May 1849
Ship	State	Description
Gleaner	United Kingdom	The barque was sunk by ice off the coast of British North America. Her crew were rescued by Victory (United Kingdom).
McKay	United Kingdom	The schooner ran aground on the Snipe Reef, off the Farne Islands. She was on a voyage from Aberdeen to Newcastle upon Tyne, Northumberland. She was refloated and resumed her voyage.

== 4 May ==
List of shipwrecks: 4 May 1849
Ship	State	Description
Crescent	(United Kingdom of Great Britain and Ireland) British North America	The ship ran aground on the Jeboque Ledge. She was on a voyage from Glasgow, Renfrewshire to Boston, Massachusetts, United States. She was refloated the next day but was consequently beached. She was refloated on 6 May and taken in to Yarmouth, Nova Scotia for repairs.
Edward O'Connor	United Kingdom	The brigantine was wrecked on the Isle of Pines (now Isla de Juventud), Cuba. Her crew were rescued.
Mary Elizabeth	United Kingdom	The ship was wrecked on the coast of "Gojira", South America. Her crew survived. The wreck was plundered by the local inhabitants.
Wellington	United Kingdom	The brig foundered in the English Channel 40 nautical miles (74 km) north east of the Casquets, Channel Islands. Her crew were rescued by the schooner Amphitrite (France). Wellington was on a voyage from South Shields, County Durham to Algiers, Algeria.

== 5 May ==
List of shipwrecks: 5 May 1849
Ship	State	Description
Brandts	Kingdom of Hanover	The sloop was driven ashore at Margate, Kent, United Kingdom. She was on a voyage from Antwerp, Belgium to London, United Kingdom. She was refloated and taken in to Margate.

== 6 May ==
List of shipwrecks: 6 May 1849
Ship	State	Description
Aurora	Sweden	The ship was in collision with Hope (Norway) and sank in the Kattegat with the loss of two of her crew. She was on a voyage from an English port to Copenhagen, Denmark.
Eliza	France	The ship foundered 60 nautical miles (110 km) north east of Belle Île, Morbihan. Her crew were rescued. She was on a voyage from Hartlepool, County Durham, United Kingdom to Bordeaux, Gironde.
Jacob	Sweden	The ship ran aground at Grebbestad. She was on a voyage from Grebbestad to London, United Kingdom. She was refloated and put in to Strömstad for repairs.
Jane Scott	(United Kingdom of Great Britain and Ireland) New South Wales	The ship was lost with all hands.
Mary Ann	United Kingdom	The ship foundered 5 nautical miles (9.3 km) south east of the Kentish Knock. Her crew were rescued. She was on a voyage from Antwerp, Belgium to Hull or Goole, Yorkshire.
Swift	(United Kingdom of Great Britain and Ireland) New South Wales	The schooner was wrecked off Cape Byron. She was on a voyage from Moreton Bay to Sydney.
Tay	United Kingdom	The ship was wrecked near Yport, Seine-Inférieure, France. She was on a voyage from Sunderland, County Durham to Le Tréport, Seine=Maritime.
Windgate Grange	United Kingdom	The ship was driven ashore at Sand Head, Isle of Wight. She was on a voyage from Guernsey, Channel Islands to Ryde, Isle of Wight.

== 8 May ==
List of shipwrecks: 8 May 1849
Ship	State	Description
Sir Walter Scott	United Kingdom	The ship struck the Lay Rock, in the English Channel off the coast of Cornwall and was abandoned by her crew. They were rescued by a schooner before she foundered.

== 10 May ==
List of shipwrecks: 10 May 1849
Ship	State	Description
Clara and Cathinka	Denmark	The ship ran aground 2 nautical miles (3.7 km) south of Læsø. She was on a voyage from Karebeksminde to Leith, Lothian, United Kingdom.
Five Brothers	Netherlands	The ship ran aground on the West Sand in the North Sea off the coast of Lincolnshire, United Kingdom. She was on a voyage from Harburg to King's Lynn, Norfolk, United Kingdom. She was refloated and put in to Wainfleet, Lincolnshire in a leaky condition.
Maria	United Kingdom	The ship struck an iceberg in the Gulf of Saint Lawrence and foundered. Of the 111 passengers and ten crew, only nine of the passengers, and five of the crew were saved by the brig Falcon and the barque Roslin Castle (both United Kingdom).

== 11 May ==
List of shipwrecks: May 1849
Ship	State	Description
Hero	United Kingdom	The ship ran aground off the mouth of the River Avon. She was on a voyage from Barnstaple, Devon to Bristol, Gloucestershire.
Matilda Ann	(United Kingdom of Great Britain and Ireland)	The schooner was driven ashore in the Richmond River.

== 12 May ==
List of shipwrecks: 12 May 1849
Ship	State	Description
Glasgow	United Kingdom	The ship ran aground at Stornoway, Isle of Lewis, Outer Hebrides. She was on a voyage from Liverpool, Lancashire to Riga, Russia. She was refloated and resumed her voyage.
John and Mary	United Kingdom	The ship ran aground on the Barber Sand, in the North Sea off the coast of Norfolk. She was refloated and resumed her voyage.

== 13 May ==
List of shipwrecks: 13 May 1849
Ship	State	Description
Adventure	United Kingdom	The ship was severely damaged by fire at Ratcliff, Middlesex.
Coverdale	United Kingdom	The ship was sunk by ice in the Atlantic Ocean. Her crew were rescued. She was on a voyage from Liverpool, Lancashire to Montreal, Province of Canada, British North America.
Mary and Elizabeth	United Kingdom	The ship ran aground at Punta Gallinas, Republic of New Granada. She was attacked by the local inhabitants and the crew abandoned her. She was pillaged and was a total loss. Mary and Elizabeth was on a voyage from Liverpool to Santa Marta, Republic of New Granada.
Napoleon Deux	France	The ship was driven ashore at Burnham Overy Staithe, Norfolk, United Kingdom. She was on a voyage from Hamburg to Burnham Overy Staithe. She was refloated and taken in to Wells-next-the-Sea, Norfolk in a leaky condition.

== 14 May ==
List of shipwrecks: 14 May 1849
Ship	State	Description
Amaranth	United Kingdom	The ship was wrecked off Læsø, Denmark with the loss of two of her crew.
Anna Maria	United Kingdom	The ship was wrecked at Cape North, Nova Scotia, British North America with the loss of three of her eight crew. She was on a voyage from London to Quebec City, Province of Canada, British North America.
Herschel	United Kingdom	The ship ran aground at Canisbay, Caithness. She was on a voyage from Glasgow, Renfrewshire to Kronstadt, Russia. She was refloated and put in to Dundee, Forfarshire.
Mary Elizabeth	United Kingdom	The barque was wrecked on Punta Gallinas, Republic of New Granada. Her crew were rescued on 30 May by HMS Sappho (Royal Navy). Mary Elizabeth was on a voyage from Liverpool, Lancashire to Santa Marta, Republic of New Granada.
Trafalgar	United Kingdom	The ship was damaged by ice and was abandoned off Cape St. Francis, Newfoundland, British North America. She was subsequently taken in to Bay Bulls, Newfoundland.

== 15 May ==
List of shipwrecks: 15 May 1849
Ship	State	Description
Cambrian	United States	The brig was driven ashore at Cape Henry, Delaware. She was refloated on 17 May and taken in to Hampton Roads.
Mary Ann	United Kingdom	The ship was driven ashore and wrecked on Læsø, Denmark. She was on a voyage from Kalundborg, Denmark to London. She was refloated on 29 September and taken in to Frederikshavn.
Morton	United Kingdom	The ship was wrecked at Cape North, Nova Scotia, British North America. Her crew were rescued.

== 16 May ==
List of shipwrecks: 16 May 1849
Ship	State	Description
Donegal	United Kingdom	The brig ran aground on the Corton Sand, in the North Sea off the coast of Suffolk. She was refloated and resumed her voyage.
Eleanor	United Kingdom	The ship was damaged by an explosion of gas in her cargo of coal at Cardiff, Glamorgan. All bar her captain were injured. She was on a voyage from Cardiff to Liverpool, Lancashire.

== 17 May ==
List of shipwrecks: 17 May 1849
Ship	State	Description
Acadia	United States	St. Louis Fire: The steamboat was destroyed by a fire that spread to her from the drifting steamboat Edward Bates after the burning Edward Bates collided with her while she was moored on the Mississippi River at St. Louis, Missouri.
Alexander Hamilton	United States	St. Louis Fire:The steamboat was destroyed by a fire that spread to her from the drifting steamboat Edward Bates after the burning Edward Bates collided with her while she was moored on the Mississippi River at St. Louis, Missouri.
Alice	United States	St. Louis Fire: The steamboat was set abaze by a fire that spread to her from the drifting steamboat Edward Bates after the burning Edward Bates collided with her while she was moored on the Mississippi River at St. Louis, Missouri. She exploded, and the fire and explosion destroyed her.
American Eagle	United States	St. Louis Fire: The steamboat was destroyed by a fire that spread to her from the drifting steamboat Edward Bates after the burning Edward Bates collided with her while she was moored on the Mississippi River at St. Louis, Missouri.
Belle Isle	United States	St. Louis Fire: The steamboat was destroyed by a fire that spread to her from the drifting steamboat Edward Bates after the burning Edward Bates collided with her while she was moored on the Mississippi River at St. Louis, Missouri.
Boreas No. 3	United States	St. Louis Fire: The steamboat was destroyed by a fire that spread to her from the drifting steamboat Edward Bates after the burning Edward Bates collided with her while she was moored on the Mississippi River at St. Louis, Missouri.
Edward Bates	United States	St. Louis Fire: The steamboat was destroyed by a fire that spread to her from the burning steamboat White Cloud while the two vessels were moored on the Mississippi River at St. Louis, Missouri. Edward Bates went adrift while ablaze and collided with 19 other steamboats as she drifted downstream, spreading the fire to them as well. The fire eventually destroyed 23 steamboats, 12 other vessels, and 430 buildings in St. Louis, killing at least three people.
Eliza Stewart	United States	St. Louis Fire: The steamboat was destroyed by a fire that spread to her from the drifting steamboat Edward Bates after the burning Edward Bates collided with her while she was moored on the Mississippi River at St. Louis, Missouri.
Empire	United States	The steamship was run into by the schooner Noah Brown (United States in the Hudson River and was severely damaged. She was taken in tow by the steamship Rip Van Winkle (United States) and beached at Newburgh, New York. The steamship Hudson (United States) assisted Rip Van Winkle in rescuing survivors; Empire was carrying 260 passengers, plus her crew. There was some loss of life.
Endora (or Eudora)	United States	St. Louis Fire: The steamboat was destroyed by a fire that spread to her from the burning steamboat White Cloud while the two vessels were moored on the Mississippi River at St. Louis, Missouri.
Frolic	United States	St. Louis Fire: The steamboat was destroyed by a fire that spread to her from the drifting steamboat Edward Bates after the burning Edward Bates collided with her while she was moored on the Mississippi River at St. Louis, Missouri.
Galatea	Greece	The ship ran aground on St. Patrick's Causeway, off the coast of Gwyneed, United Kingdom. She was on a voyage from Westport, County Mayo, United Kingdom to Cardiff, Glamorgan.
General Brooks	United States	St. Louis Fire: The steamboat was destroyed by a fire that spread to her from the drifting steamboat Edward Bates after the burning Edward Bates collided with her while she was moored on the Mississippi River at St. Louis, Missouri.
Jacob Adams	United States	St. Louis Fire: The steamboat was destroyed by a fire that spread to her from the drifting steamboat Edward Bates after the burning Edward Bates collided with her while she was moored on the Mississippi River at St. Louis, Missouri.
Julia	United States	St. Louis Fire: The steamboat was damaged by a fire that spread to her from the drifting steamboat Edward Bates after the burning Edward Bates collided with her while she was moored on the Mississippi River at St. Louis, Missouri.
Kit Carson	United States	St. Louis Fire: The steamboat was destroyed by a fire that spread to her from the drifting steamboat Edward Bates after the burning Edward Bates collided with her while she was moored on the Mississippi River at St. Louis, Missouri.
Martha	United States	St. Louis Fire: The steamboat was destroyed by a fire that spread to her from the drifting steamboat Edward Bates after the burning Edward Bates collided with her while she was moored on the Mississippi River at St. Louis, Missouri.
Mameluke	United States	St. Louis Fire: The steamboat was destroyed by a fire that spread to her from the drifting steamboat Edward Bates after the burning Edward Bates collided with her while she was moored on the Mississippi River at St. Louis, Missouri.
Mandan	United States	St. Louis Fire: The steamboat was destroyed by a fire that spread to her from the drifting steamboat Edward Bates after the burning Edward Bates collided with her while she was moored on the Mississippi River at St. Louis, Missouri.
Montauk	United States	St. Louis Fire: The steamboat was destroyed by a fire that spread to her from the drifting steamboat Edward Bates after the burning Edward Bates collided with her while she was moored on the Mississippi River at St. Louis, Missouri.
Prairie State	United States	St. Louis Fire: The steamboat was destroyed by a fire that spread to her from the drifting steamboat Edward Bates after the burning Edward Bates collided with her while she was moored on the Mississippi River at St. Louis, Missouri.
Redwing	United States	St. Louis Fire:The steamboat was destroyed by a fire that spread to her from the drifting steamboat Edward Bates after the burning Edward Bates collided with her while she was moored on the Mississippi River at St. Louis, Missouri.
Sarah	United States	St. Louis Fire: The steamboat was destroyed by a fire that spread to her from the drifting steamboat Edward Bates after the burning Edward Bates collided with her while she was moored on the Mississippi River at St. Louis, Missouri.
Schiller	Bremen	The ship was driven ashore south of Baltimore, Maryland, United States. She was refloated.
St. Peters	United States	St. Louis Fire: The steamboat was destroyed by a fire that spread to her from the drifting steamboat Edward Bates after the burning Edward Bates collided with her while she was moored on the Mississippi River at St. Louis, Missouri.
Susanna Collings	United Kingdom	The ship was driven ashore 9 nautical miles (17 km) north of Latakia, Ottoman Lebanon. She was on a voyage from Beyrout, Ottoman Lebanon to Alexandria, Egypt Eyalet.
Taghioui	United States	St. Louis Fire: The steamboat was destroyed by a fire that spread to her from the drifting steamboat Edward Bates after the burning Edward Bates collided with her while she was moored on the Mississippi River at St. Louis, Missouri.
Timour	United States	St. Louis Fire: The steamboat was destroyed by a fire that spread to her from the drifting steamboat Edward Bates after the burning Edward Bates collided with her while she was moored on the Mississippi River at St. Louis, Missouri.
White Cloud	United States	The St. Louis fire. St. Louis Fire: The steamboat caught fire at St. Louis, Missouri, while she was moored on the Mississippi River waterfront. The fire spread over the next 11 hours, destroying her, 22 other steamboats, 12 other vessels, and 430 buildings, with the loss of at least three lives.
Zephyr	United Kingdom	The ship was driven ashore near the North and South Lighthouse, County Antrim. She was on a voyage from Liverpool, Lancashire to Memel, Prussia. She was refloated and taken in to Donaghadee, County Down for repairs.
Several barges	United States	St. Louis Fire: A waterfront fire at St. Louis, Missouri, spread to the barges at their moorings on the Mississippi River, destroying them.
Nine flatboats	United States	St. Louis Fire: A waterfront fire at St. Louis, Missouri, spread to the flatboats at their moorings on the Mississippi River, destroying them.

== 18 May ==
List of shipwrecks: 18 May 1849
Ship	State	Description
Asia	United Kingdom	The ship ran aground on the Middle Ground, in the North Sea off the coast of County Durham. She was on a voyage from South Shields, County Durham to London.
Duchess of Buccleuch	United Kingdom	The ship ran aground on the Long Sand, in the North Sea off the coast of Essex. Her crew were rescued. She was on a voyage from South Shields, County Durham to Calcutta, India. She was refloated on 20 May and towed in to Ramsgate, Kent.
John Grey	United Kingdom	The ship ran aground on the Middle Ground. She was on a voyage from Agrigento, Sicily to South Shields. She was refloated the next day.
Laura	United Kingdom	The ship was driven ashore and wrecked on the coast of Jutland. Her crew were rescued. She was on a voyage from Taranto, Kingdom of the Two Sicilies to Saint Petersburg, Russia.
Marcellus	United Kingdom	The ship was holed by ice and sank in the Baltic Sea 10 nautical miles (19 km) south west of Narva, Russia. Her crew were rescued. She was on a voyage from Alloa, Clackmannanshire to Kronstadt, Russia.
Rose	United Kingdom	The barque was wrecked on the Cobblers Rock, off Barbados. All on board were rescued. She was on a voyage from London to Barbados.

== 19 May ==
List of shipwrecks: 19 May 1849
Ship	State	Description
Emily Maria	United Kingdom	The smack struck a sunken rock and sank off Killybegs, County Donegal. Her crew were rescued. She was on a voyage from Liverpool, Lancashire to Donegal.
Isabella and Jane	(United Kingdom of Great Britain and Ireland) Jersey	The ship ran aground at Sunderland, County Durham. She was on a voyage from Sunderland to Jersey.
Isis	United Kingdom	The ship was driven ashore near Kronstadt, Russia.
Margaret	United Kingdom	The ship ran aground on the Barber Sand, in the North Sea off the coast of Norfolk. She was on a voyage from Seaham, County Durham to Whitstable, Kent. She was refloated and resumed her voyage.

== 20 May ==
List of shipwrecks: 20 May 1849
Ship	State	Description
Ann	United Kingdom	The smack was wrecked at Bogney Point, Isle of Bute. Her crew were rescued.
Huskisson	United Kingdom	The brig ran aground and was wrecked off Wexford. she was on a voyage from Liverpool, Lancashire to Chichester, Sussex.

== 21 May ==
List of shipwrecks: 21 May 1849
Ship	State	Description
Hope	United Kingdom	The ship struck the Inner Dowson Sand, in the North Sea. She was consequently beached at Mablethorpe, Lincolnshire. She was on a voyage from Sunderland, County Durham to the Charente.
Scout	(United Kingdom of Great Britain and Ireland) South Australia	The brig was wrecked near Swan Island, Van Diemen's Land. Her crew were rescued. She was on a voyage from Hobart, Van Diemen's Land to Adelaide.

== 22 May ==
List of shipwrecks: 22 May 1849
Ship	State	Description
Agnes	United Kingdom	The brig was abandoned in the Atlantic Ocean. Her crew were rescued by Bellazies (France). Agnes was on a voyage from Pwllheli, Caernarvonshire to Quebec City, Province of Canada, British North America.
Downs	United States	The brig was driven ashore on Fox Island, New Brunswick, British North America. She was refloated.
Durham	United Kingdom	The barque was driven ashore in the Dardanelles, She was refloated.
Flor do Lima	Portugal	The ship was driven ashore at Holyhead, Anglesey, United Kingdom. She was on a voyage from Liverpool, Lancashire, United Kingdom to Viana do Castelano. She was refloated the next day and taken in to Holyhead.
Mary Jones	United Kingdom	The ship struck the Low Sca Rock and was damaged. She was consequently taken in to Penzance, Cornwall.
Santa Cruz	United States	The steamship foundered 9 leagues (27 nautical miles (50 km)) off "Maxambaia", Brazil. Her crew survived. She was on a voyage from Rio de Janeiro, Brazil to San Francisco, California.

== 23 May ==
List of shipwrecks: 23 May 1849
Ship	State	Description
Ellen	(United Kingdom of Great Britain and Ireland) British North America	The ship was wrecked on Grand Cayman, Cayman Islands. She was on a voyage from Kingston, Jamaica to Matanzas, Cuba.
Martha Jane	United Kingdom	The ship ran aground on the Silloth Bank, in the Irish Sea off the coast of Cumberland. She was on a voyage from Liverpool, Lancashire to Saint John, New Brunswick, British North America. She was refloated the next day but consequently sank off Skinburness, Cumberland. Her crew were rescued.
Mary	United Kingdom	The brigantine was run down and sunk in the English Channel off Dodman Point, Cornwall by Panama (United Kingdom). Her six crew were rescued by Panama. Mary was on a voyage from Pentewan, Cornwall to Liverpool, Lancashire or Runcorn, Cheshire.
Theresa	United Kingdom	The ship ran aground on the Newcombe Sand, in the North Sea off the coast of Suffolk. She was refloated and assisted in to Lowestoft, Suffolk.

== 24 May ==
List of shipwrecks: 24 May 1849
Ship	State	Description
Robert and Ann	United Kingdom	The ship was driven ashore and wrecked in Blackhead Bay. She was on a voyage from Cádiz, Spain to Saint John's, Newfoundland, British North America.

== 25 May ==
List of shipwrecks: 25 May 1849
Ship	State	Description
Alice	United Kingdom	The ship was abandoned in the Atlantic Ocean. Her crew were rescued by Hyndsford (United Kingdom). Alice was on a voyage from Cardiff, Glamorgan to Quebec City, Province of Canada, British North America.
Edward O'Connor	(United Kingdom of Great Britain and Ireland) British North America	The hermaphrodite brig was driven ashore and wrecked on the Isla de Juventud, Cuba. Her crew survived.
Retrieve	United Kingdom	The ship was driven ashore 4 nautical miles (7.4 km) south of Ayr. She was on a voyage from Greenock, Renfrewshire to Trinidad. She was refloated on 28 May and put back to Greenock in a leaky condition.

== 26 May ==
List of shipwrecks: June 1849
Ship	State	Description
Friends	United Kingdom	The ship was in collision with a schooner and sank in the Bristol Channel off Lundy Island, Devon. Her crew were rescued. She was on a voyage from Cardiff, Glamorgan to Portsmouth, Hampshire.
Ruth	United Kingdom	The barque sprang a leak and sank off the coast of County Cork. Her crew survived. She was on a voyage from Harwich, Essex to Saint John, New Brunswick, British North America.

== 28 May ==
List of shipwrecks: 28 May 1849
Ship	State	Description
Donegal	United Kingdom	The schooner was driven ashore at Kingsdown, Kent. She was on a voyage from Middlesbrough, Yorkshire to Exeter, Devon. She was refloated.
Flotte	Bremen	The ship was wrecked on rocks near "Porto Plata". She was on a voyage from Hull, Yorkshire, United Kingdom.
Mirre	United Kingdom	The ship ran aground and sank in the River Avon. She was on a voyage from Bristol, Gloucestershire to Neath, Glamorgan. She was refloated on 30 May and taken in to Bristol.

== 29 May ==
List of shipwrecks: 29 May 1849
Ship	State	Description
Agrilis	United Kingdom	The ship was driven ashore at Seraglio Point, Ottoman Empire. She was on a voyage from Constantinople, Ottoman Empire to Cork or Falmouth, Cornwall. She was refloated and resumed her voyage.
Henrietta	United Kingdom	The ship was driven ashore at Mizen Head, County Cork. She was on a voyage from Swansea, Glamorgan to Ballydonegan Bay. She was refloated, taken in to Crookhaven, County Cork and beached.
Queen Pomare	United Kingdom	The ship was abandoned in the Pacific Ocean off the Tres Montes Peninsula, Chile. Her crew were rescued. She was on a voyage from Callao, Peru to an English port.
St. Christophe	Stettin	The ship was driven ashore and wrecked near Kronstadt, Russia. She was on a voyage from Stettin to Kronstadt. She was refloated the next day and taken in to Kronstadt.

== 30 May ==
List of shipwrecks: 30 May 1849
Ship	State	Description
Canovas	Spain	The schooner capsized in a squall. Her crew were rescued. She was on a voyage from Barcelona to Almería.
Maria	United Kingdom	The ship was sunk by ice in the Gulf of Saint Lawrence with the loss of twelve lives. She was on a voyage from Limerick to Quebec City, Province of Canada, British North America.

== 31 May ==
List of shipwrecks: 31 May 1849
Ship	State	Description
Arachne	United Kingdom	The ship departed from Constantinople, Ottoman Empire for a British port. No further trace, presumed foundered with the loss of all hands.
Dolphin	United Kingdom	The ship was driven ashore on Calf Island, Massachusetts, United States. She was on a voyage from Liverpool, Nova Scotia, British North America to Boston, Massachusetts.
Harp	United Kingdom	The ship was driven ashore at Troon, Ayrshire. She was on a voyage from Liverpool, Lancashire to Troon.

== Unknown date ==
List of shipwrecks: Unknown date in May 1849
Ship	State	Description
Ariel	United Kingdom	The schooner was abandoned in the Grand Banks of Newfoundland before 29 May. All twelve people on board were rescued by Amethyst (United Kingdom).
Burtel	United Kingdom	The ship was wrecked on the Sarrona Reef before 5 May. She was on a voyage from Newport, Monmouthshire to New Orleans, Louisiana.
Canning	United Kingdom	The ship was wrecked near Kuressaare, Russia before 24 May. Her crew survived. She was on a voyage from Cádiz, Spain to Saint Petersburg, Russia.
Cordelia	United Kingdom	The ship was driven ashore near Pictou, Nova Scotia, British North America before 26 May. She was on a voyage form Boston, Massachusetts, United States to Pictou.
Desdemona	Flag unknown	The brigantine was in collision with John R. Skiddy (United States) in the Atlantic Ocean and was abandoned. Her crew were rescued by John R. Skiddy. Desdemona was on a voyage from New York. United States to Sligo.
Deux Maria	France	The ship was driven ashore and wrecked on the coast of Mexico before 15 May. She was on a voyage from Tampico to Tuxpan.
Duke	United Kingdom	The ship ran aground at New Orleans. She was on a voyage from New Orleans to Liverpool, Lancashire.
Duke of Wellington	United Kingdom	The ship was driven ashore at Cape St. Antonio, Cuba. She was on a voyage from Belize City, British Honduras to Havana, Cuba. She was refloated and taken in to Havana in a waterlogged condition. She arrived on 22 May and was beached.
John H. Stevens	United States	The ship was abandoned in the Atlantic Ocean before 12 May.
Maria and Elizabeth	United Kingdom	The ship was sunk by ice in the Atlantic Ocean off the coast of British North America.
Narara	(United Kingdom of Great Britain and Ireland) New South Wales	The schooner was wrecked in the Solitary Islands. Her crew were rescued.
Peace	United Kingdom	The sloop was wrecked on the Point of Waterstein, Isle of Skye, Outer Hebrides between 25 and 31 May. Her crew were rescued.
Resolution	United Kingdom	The ship was sunk by ice in the Atlantic Ocean off the coast of British North America.
Veloce	(United Kingdom of Great Britain and Ireland) British North America	The schooner was driven ashore at Richibucto, New Brunswick before 1 June. She was on a voyage from Quebec City, Province of Canada to Richibucto. She was refloated on 14 June and taken in to Richibucto for repairs.
Vesperus	United Kingdom	The ship was sunk by ice in the Atlantic Ocean before 16 May. Her crew were rescued.
