= Duchess of Buccleugh (ship) =

Several vessels have been named Duchess of Buccleugh or Duchess of Buccleuch for one or another Duchess of Buccleuch:

- Duchess of Buccleugh (1784 ship) was launched at Lieth. She ran ashore in 1788 near Yarmouth and was wrecked.
- Duchess of Buccleuch (1843 ship) was built by James Edwards of South Shields. On 13 June 1850 she ran ashore at Quoin Point near Cape Agulhas after losing her rudder while sailing from Calcutta to London with a cargo of indigo, rice, pepper & silk. She was refloated and taken to Cape Town where she was condemned on 26 July.
- PS Rouen (1888) was a passenger vessel built for the London, Brighton and South Coast Railway. She was sold in 1903 to the Barrow Steam Navigation Company and renamed Duchess of Buccleuch. In 1907 the Midland Railway acquired her, retaining the name; she was broken up in 1909.
- HMS Duchess of Buccleuch (1916) was a paddle steamer that the British Admiralty purchased on the stocks at Glasgow, where she was being built by A. & J. Inglis. She was converted from mercantile service to a minesweeper and served with the Auxiliary Patrol. She laid up after the war and sold in January 1923 for breaking up.

== See also ==
- Duke of Buccleugh (ship)
