= Duke of Buccleugh (ship) =

Several vessels have been named Duke of Buccleugh (or Duke of Buccleuch) for the Duke of Buccleuch:

- Duke of Buccleugh (1783 ship) was launched at Yarmouth. In 1789 she became a slave ship. She made five complete enslaving voyages before a French privateer captured her in September 1797 after she had delivered her captives from her sixth voyage.
- Duke of Buccleugh (1788 EIC ship) was an East Indiaman launched in 1788. She made six voyages for the British East India Company (EIC) before she was sold in 1802.
- Duke of Buccleugh (1829 ship), of 205 tons (bm) was launched at Leith. She mostly traded between Leith and London and was last listed in 1844.
- Duke of Buccleugh (1831 ship) made one voyage for the EIC and then traded privately between England and India until she was lost in 1840.

== See also ==
- Duchess of Buccleugh (ship)
