= List of shipwrecks in June 1850 =

The list of shipwrecks in June 1850 includes ships sunk, foundered, wrecked, grounded, or otherwise lost during June 1850.

== 1 June ==
List of shipwrecks: 1 June 1850
Ship	State	Description
Marquis of Breadalbane	United Kingdom	The ship ran aground on Læsø, Denmark. She was on a voyage from Svendborg, Denmark to London. She was refloated and put in to Christiansand, Norway in a leaky condition.
Orient	United Kingdom	The ship ran aground on Naissaar, Russia. She was on a voyage from Reval, Russia to Aberdeen. She was refloated the next day and resumed her voyage.
Somerset	United Kingdom	The brigantine was wrecked 150 nautical miles (280 km) north of Demerara, British Guiana with the loss of three of her crew.

== 2 June ==
List of shipwrecks: 2 June 1850
Ship	State	Description
Roseway	(United Kingdom of Great Britain and Ireland) British North America	The ship was wrecked on the coast of the Dominican Republic. She was on a voyage from Halifax, Nova Scotia to Jamaica.

== 3 June ==
List of shipwrecks: 3 June 1850
Ship	State	Description
Mary Florence	United Kingdom	The ship was wrecked off Cape Guardafui, Majeerteen Sultanate with the loss of four of the 22 people on board. She was on her maiden voyage, from London to Aden. The wreck was plundered by the local inhabitants.

== 5 June ==
List of shipwrecks: 5 June 1850
Ship	State	Description
Arab	United Kingdom	The ship was driven ashore and wrecked near the mouth of the Salt River. All on board were rescued. She was on a voyage from Mauritius to London.
Betsey	United Kingdom	The ship sprang a leak and foundered in the North Sea 14 nautical miles (26 km) east south east of Flamborough Head, Yorkshire. Her crew were rescued by Pelican (United Kingdom). Betsey was on a voyage from Hartlepool, County Durham to Ipswich, Suffolk.
Kent	United Kingdom	The barque was driven ashore and wrecked in Hottentot Bay. Her crew were rescued.
Speed	(United Kingdom of Great Britain and Ireland) British North America	The ship ran aground on the Sandy Island Reef. She was refloated and taken in to Saint Kitts for repairs.

== 6 June ==
List of shipwrecks: 6 June 1850
Ship	State	Description
Jane	United Kingdom	The oyster dredger was run down and sunk in the English Channel 23 nautical miles (43 km) off Fécamp, Seine-Inférieure, France by a French Navy brig. Her crew were rescued.
Rosina	United Kingdom	The brig foundered in the Atlantic Ocean off Cape. St. Vincent, Portugal. She was on a voyage from Cartagena, Spain to Newcastle upon Tyne, Northumberland.
Unknown name	(United Kingdom of Great Britain and Ireland) New Zealand	A vessel was lost off Kapiti Island during a storm, with the loss of two lives.

== 7 June ==
List of shipwrecks: 7 June 1850
Ship	State	Description
Cossack	United Kingdom	The ship ran aground and was wrecked on the Weser Till. She was on a voyage from Newcastle upon Tyne, Northumberland to Hamburg.
Duchess of Buccleuch	United Kingdom	The ship foundered off Cape Gallas. Her crew were rescued. She was on a voyage from Calcutta, India to London.
Frederick	United Kingdom	The ship was driven ashore near the Crosby Lighthouse, Lancashire. She was on a voyage from Saint John, New Brunswick, British North America to Liverpool, Lancashire.
Franklin	United States	The whaler Franklin, under Captain Cooper, went ashore approximately 70 nautical miles (130 km) north of Pernambuco, Brazil on her way home from the Pacific Ocean.
Joseph Bryant	United States	The ship foundered in the Atlantic Ocean. Two of her crew were rescued, the remainder were reported missing. She was on a voyage from Agrigento, Sicily to Boston, Massachusetts.
Sir Robert Barclay	United Kingdom	The ship sprang a leak and sank in the North Sea north of Margate, Kent. Her crew were rescued by the fishing smack Victoria (United Kingdom). Sir Robert Barclay was on a voyage from South Shields, County Durham to Gibraltar.
Taylor	United Kingdom	The ship struck a sunken rock and sank in the Baltic Sea off "Filsand", Russia. Her crew were rescued by Martha (United Kingdom). She was on a voyage from Newcastle upon Tyne to Kronstadt, Russia.

== 8 June ==
List of shipwrecks: August 1850
Ship	State	Description
Elizabeth	United Kingdom	The ship ran aground at Coleraine, County Antrim. She was on a voyage from Liverpool, Lancashire to Coleraine.
Farmer	United Kingdom	The ship ran aground and was severely damaged at Coleraine. She was on a voyage from the Clyde to Coleraine.
Fortuna	Sweden	The ship was wrecked at Vendsyssel, Denmark. Her crew were rescued. She was on a voyage from Kristianstad to London, United Kingdom.
Thronderen	Norway	The ship was wrecked near Berlevåg with the loss of a crew member.
Victoria	United Kingdom	The brig ran aground on the English Bank, in the River Plate and was abandoned by her crew. She was on a voyage from Buenos Aires, Argentina to Liverpool.

== 9 June ==
List of shipwrecks: 9 June 1850
Ship	State	Description
Asiatic	United Kingdom	The ship was wrecked in Algoa Bay. Her crew were rescued. She was on a voyage from Adelaide, South Australia to London.
Grindlay	United Kingdom	The barque was abandoned off Cape Recife, Cape Colony. All on board were rescued by Border Maid (United Kingdom).
Santipore	United Kingdom	The ship ran aground in Lacepede Bay. All on board survived. She was on a voyage from London to Port Phillip, South Australia and Sydney, New South Wales.

== 10 June ==
List of shipwrecks: 10 June 1850
Ship	State	Description
Gunga	India	The ship was driven ashore and wrecked at Madras.
L'Agile	French Navy	The French Republican brig L'Agile of 14 guns, was suddenly overtaken by a heavy squall off Martinique and capsized and went down with the loss of all but 2 of its 60 crew.

== 11 June ==
List of shipwrecks: June 1850
Ship	State	Description
Antonio Alessandro	Austrian Empire	The brig was lost off Cape San Antonio, Argentina. Her crew were rescued. She was on a voyage from Rio de Janeiro, Brazil to Montevideo, Uruguay.
Elizabeth	United Kingdom	The ship ran aground at Shoreham-by-Sea, Sussex.
Fame	United Kingdom	The ship sprang a leak and sank in the River Usk. She was on a voyage from Charleston, South Carolina, United States to Newport, Monmouthshire. She was refloated on 13 June and taken in to Newport.
Mary Ann	United Kingdom	The ship sprang a leak and sank in the Irish Sea off Great Orme Head, Caernarfonshire. Her crew were rescued.

== 12 June ==
List of shipwrecks: 12 June 1850
Ship	State	Description
Eliza	United Kingdom	The sloop ran aground on the Barber Sand, in the North Sea off the coast of Norfolk. She was refloated and resumed her voyage.
Elizabeth Ainslie	United Kingdom	The ship was destroyed by fire at Cumsingmoon, India.
Mary Ann	United Kingdom	The schooner ran aground and was wrecked on the Barber Sand. Her crew survived. She was on a voyage from Seaham, County Durham to Plymouth, Devon. Mary Ann was refloated the next day and towed in to Great Yarmouth, Norfolk.

== 13 June ==
List of shipwrecks: 13 June 1850
Ship	State	Description
Amalia	Norway	The ship ran aground on the Cross Sand, in the North Sea off the coast of Norfolk, United Kingdom. She was on a voyage from Christiansand to Bilbao, Spain. She was refloated and put in to Great Yarmouth, Norfolk in a leaky condition.
Eliza	United Kingdom	The sloop was driven ashore near Belfast, County Antrim. She was on a voyage from Liverpool, Lancashire to Belfast.
Mosca	Spain	The ship was wrecked on Petite Key, Bahamas. She was on a voyage from Havre de Grâce, Seine-Inférieure, France to Havana, Cuba.

== 14 June ==
List of shipwrecks: 14 June 1850
Ship	State	Description
City of Glasgow	United Kingdom	The steamship ran aground in the Clyde. She was on a voyage from Glasgow, Renfrewshire to New York, United States. She was refloated the next day and resumed her voyage.
David	United Kingdom	The sloop was driven ashore and wrecked at Skinningrove, Yorkshire. Her crew were rescued.
Gray	United Kingdom	The sloop was driven ashore and wrecked at Skinningrove. Her crew were rescued.
Hammond	United Kingdom	The ship was driven ashore, capsized and was wrecked at Hartlepool, County Durham. Her crew were rescued. She was on a voyage from London to South Shields, County Durham.
Little Henry	United Kingdom	The ship was driven ashore at Skinningrove. Her crew were rescued.
Relief	United Kingdom	The sloop was driven ashore and wrecked at Skinningrove. Her crew were rescued.

== 17 June ==
List of shipwrecks: 17 June 1850
Ship	State	Description
Armsdale	United Kingdom	The ship ran aground on the Blonde Rock, off Cape Sable Island, Nova Scotia, British North America. She was on a voyage from Parrsborough, Nova Scotia to Cork. She was refloated and put in to Yarmouth, Nova Scotia for repairs.
Dina	(flag) Netherlands	The ship was driven into another Dutch vessel and sank off Narva, Russia with the loss of all hands.
G. P. Griffith	United States	G. P. Griffith The paddle steamer caught fire in Lake Erie three miles (4.8 km) offshore. The vessel ran aground and was beached in seven feet (2.1 m) of water one-half mile (0.80 km) offshore. Between 241 and 289 people died, with only 30-40 surviving.

== 18 June ==
List of shipwrecks: June 1850
Ship	State	Description
Hope	United Kingdom	The ship ran aground on the Hangley Rocks, off the coast of Northumberland. She was on a voyage from London to Glasgow, Renfrewshire. She was refloated and resumed her voyage.
Orion	United Kingdom	The paddle steamer struck a sunken rock and sank off Portpatrick, Wigtownshire with the loss of 41 of the 200 people on board. Some of the survivors were rescued by Fenella ( (United Kingdom of Great Britain and Ireland) Isle of Man), others by boats from Portpatrick. Orion was on a voyage from Glasgow to Liverpool, Lancashire.
Triumph	United States	The ship ran aground at New York. She was on a voyage from New York to Nova Scotia, British North America. She was refloated.

== 19 June ==
List of shipwrecks: 19 June 1850
Ship	State	Description
Ansdale	United Kingdom	The ship ran aground on the Blonde Rock, off Cape Sable Island, Nova Scotia, British North America. She was refloated with assistance from HMS Columbia (Royal Navy).

== 21 June ==
List of shipwrecks: 21 June 1850
Ship	State	Description
Esmeralda	Spain	The brig was wrecked at the mouth of the River Plate. She was on a voyage from Barcelona and Málaga to Buenos Aires, Argentina.
John Guise	United Kingdom	The ship struck rocks and was wrecked near Fishguard, Pembrokeshire. Her crew were rescued. She was on a voyage from Glasgow, Renfrewshire to Newport, Monmouthshire.
Lady Colebrooke	United Kingdom	The ship was wrecked on Scatterie Island, Nova Scotia, British North America. Her crew were rescued. she was on a voyage from New York, United States to Liverpool, Lancashire.
Mary	United Kingdom	The pilot boat was wrecked at The Mumbles, Glamorgan. Her crew survived.
Sylvanus	United Kingdom	The ship was wrecked at Flamborough Head, Yorkshire. Her crew were rescued.

== 22 June ==
List of shipwrecks: 22 June 1850
Ship	State	Description
Monmouth	United Kingdom	The ship was in collision with a brig and foundered off Tangier, Morocco. Her crew were rescued. She was on a voyage from Liverpool, Lancashire to a port in Ottoman Syria.

== 23 June ==
List of shipwrecks: 23 June 1850
Ship	State	Description
Anna Wilhelmina	Kingdom of Hanover	The ship was driven ashore on Juist. Her crew were rescued. She was on a voyage from "Dorumnersee" to London, United Kingdom.
Catharina	Denmark	The ship was wrecked near Hirtshals. She was on a voyage from Horsens to Bristol, Gloucestershire, United Kingdom.
Ceylon	United States	The ship was driven ashore and wrecked near Cutler, Maine. She was on a voyage from Boston, Massachusetts to Saint John, New Brunswick.
Hong Kong	(United Kingdom of Great Britain and Ireland) Hong Kong	The steamship was severely damaged by fire whilst on a voyage from Canton, China to Hong Kong.

== 24 June ==
List of shipwrecks: 24 June 1850
Ship	State	Description
Anglo America	United Kingdom	The ship was driven ashore on Rathlin Island, County Donegal. She was on a voyage from Liverpool, Lancashire to Boston, Massachusetts. She was refloated and resumed her voyage.
Eagle	United Kingdom	The ship was driven ashore near the mouth of the Narva River. Her crew were rescued.
Viceroy	United Kingdom	The paddle steamer was wrecked at Shag Harbour, Nova Scotia, British North America. All on board were rescued. She was on a voyage from New York, United States to Galway.

== 25 June ==
List of shipwrecks: 25 June 1850
Ship	State	Description
Conside	United Kingdom	The collier struck the pier and sank at Havre de Grâce, Seine-Inférieure. France. She was on a voyage form South Shields, County Durham to Havre de Grâce
Gerkules (Геркулес, 'Hercules')	Imperial Russian Navy	The steamship ran aground on a reef about 350 metres (0.2 nmi) off the northwestern tip of Aegna in the Gulf of Finland. Her crew were rescued. She was on a voyage from Helsingfors to Reval. Gerkules was refloated on 30 June, subsequently repaired and returned to service.
Margaret	(United Kingdom of Great Britain and Ireland) South Australia	The schooner was driven ashore in Apollo Bay.
Royal Albert	United Kingdom	The ship was driven ashore and wrecked in Table Bay. Her crew were rescued.
St. Michel	France	The lugger collided with Essex (United States) and sank 15 nautical miles (28 km) north of the Longships. Her crew were rescued. She was on a voyage from Bordeaux, Gironde to Waterford, United Kingdom.
William	(United Kingdom of Great Britain and Ireland) South Australia	The schooner was driven ashore in Apollo Bay.

== 26 June ==
List of shipwrecks: 26 June 1850
Ship	State	Description
Gustave II	Sweden	The ship ran aground in the Thanlwin River. She was consequently condemned.
Margaret	United Kingdom	The ship foundered off Corsewall Point, Wigtownshire. Her crew were rescued. She was on a voyage from Ardrossan, Ayrshire to Runcorn, Cheshire.
Mary	United Kingdom	The ship ran aground, capsized and sank in the River Dee at Connah's Quay, Flintshire.
Yeoman's Glory	United Kingdom	The schooner ran aground on the Burbo Bank, in Liverpool Bay. She was refloated and resumed her voyage.

== 27 June ==
List of shipwrecks: 27 June 1850
Ship	State	Description
Espoir	France	The ship ran aground on the Shipwash Sand, in the North Sea off the coast of Essex, United Kingdom. She was on a voyage from Seaham, County Durham, United Kingdom to Bordeaux, Gironde. She was refloated and taken in to Harwich, Essex in a leaky condition.
Fame	United Kingdom	The ship was wrecked on the Goodwin Sands, Kent. Her crew were rescued. She was on a voyage from Seaham, County Durham to Bayonne, Loire-Inférieure.
Henry Alexander	United Kingdom	The ship collided with the steamship Neptune (United Kingdom) and sank in the Swin, off the coast of Essex. She was on a voyage from Hamburg to London.
Margery	United Kingdom	The ship ran aground and was damaged at Littlehampton, Sussex. She was on a voyage from Littlehampton to Runcorn, Cheshire.
Southampton	United Kingdom	The ship was driven ashore at Claves End, Isle of Wight. She was refloated and resumed her voyage.
Vriendschap	Netherlands	The galiot was struck by lightning in the Bay of Biscay and was abandoned with the loss of a crew member. Survivors were rescued by the steamship Propontis (United Kingdom).

== 28 June ==
List of shipwrecks: 28 June 1850
Ship	State	Description
Fama	United Kingdom	The ship was wrecked on the Luconia Shoals or the Scarborough Shoal, in the South China Sea. Her crew were rescued. She was on a voyage from Hong Kong, China to Manila, Spanish East Indies
Huntcliffe	United Kingdom	The ship was driven ashore at Bolderāja, Russia. She was refloated on 10 July and taken in to Bolderāja.
Minerva	United Kingdom	The ship was wrecked at Port Natal, Cape Colony. All on board were rescued. she was on a voyage from London to Port Natal and Madra, India.

== 29 June ==
List of shipwrecks: 29 June 1850
Ship	State	Description
Catharine	Hamburg	The ship was driven ashore at Fjaltring, Denmark. Her crew were rescued. She was on a voyage from the Elbe to Skive, Denmark.
Harraton	United Kingdom	The ship was driven ashore and wrecked at Hamina, Grand Duchy of Finland. She was on a voyage from Kronstadt, Russia to Hamina.
Hotspur	United Kingdom	The ship was driven ashore at Saint Thomas, Virgin Islands.

== 30 June ==
List of shipwrecks: 30 June 1850
Ship	State	Description
Iberia	Spain	The ship was driven ashore near Vila Real de Santo António, Portugal. She was on a voyage from Cádiz to London, United Kingdom. She was refloated and resumed her voyage, but put in to A Coruña for repairs.
Samuel and Mary Ann	United Kingdom	The ship sprang a leak and sank off Blackhead, County Antrim. Her crew were rescued. She was on a voyage from Belmullet, County Mayo to Liverpool, Lancashire.

== Unknown date ==
List of shipwrecks: Unknown date 1850
Ship	State	Description
Aigle	France	The ship was wrecked at "Zielzekama", Cape Colony before 22 June with the loss of nine of the nineteen people on board. She was on a voyage from Sumatra, Netherlands East Indies to Marseille, Bouches-du-Rhône.
Agnes Hay	(United Kingdom of Great Britain and Ireland) New Zealand	The schooner was wrecked during a gale at the end of June. All hands were saved.
British Settler	United Kingdom	The ship was wrecked at Jacobs Bay, British Cape Colony with the loss of all hands.
Carbon	(United Kingdom of Great Britain and Ireland) New Zealand	The schooner was wrecked north of Castlepoint in the Wairarapa during a gale at the end of June, with the loss of all crew. She was en route from Wellington to Napier.
Carl Wilhelm	Stettin	The ship was driven ashore on Rügen, Prussia. She was on a voyage from Stettin to a Norwegian port. She was refloated on 29 June and taken in to Stralsund.
Columbus	United Kingdom	The ship was wrecked off Cobh, County Cork with some loss of life before 24 June. There were at least three survivors.
Corsair	United Kingdom	The ship was wrecked on Cape Race, Newfoundland, British North America before 24 June. All on board, more than 200 people, survived. She was on a voyage from Liverpool, Lancashire to New York, United States.
Drie Broders	Netherlands	The ship was driven ashore on Cross Island, in the White Sea, by ice and was wrecked. She was on a voyage from Chatham, Kent, United Kingdom to Arkhangelsk, Russia.
Emily	United Kingdom	The brigantine was wrecked 10 nautical miles (19 km) north of Pondicherry, India before 18 June.
Franklin	United States	The ship was driven ashore on the coast of Paraíba, Brazil before 16 June.
Friendship	United Kingdom	The ship was wrecked at St Helena Bay, Cape Colony.
Gratitude	United Kingdom	The ship was driven ashore at Spike Point, County Cork before 6 June. She was refloated and resumed her voyage to the Clyde.
Imperial	United States	The ship was wrecked on the Jardanilloes, off the coast of Cuba. She was on a voyage from Savannah-la-Mar, Jamaica to New York.
Jenny Lind	(United Kingdom of Great Britain and Ireland) Jersey	The ship was abandoned whilst on a voyage from Glasgow, Renfrewshire to Nantes, Loire-Inférieure, France. She was taken in to Concarneau, Finistère, France on 28 June in a waterlogged condition.
Lerwick	United Kingdom	The ship was abandoned in the Atlantic Ocean by all but her captain. Her crew were rescued by the brig Camerton (United Kingdom). Her captain was rescued on 18 June by Northumbria (United Kingdom). Lerwick was on a voyage from Sydney, Nova Scotia, British North America to Fleetwood, Lancashire. Also reported as having been abandoned on 28 June.
Ottawa	United Kingdom	The ship foundered in the Bristol Channel before 22 June.
Planet	United Kingdom	The ship was wrecked on the Cojunies Reef before 1 July. She was on a voyage from Cardiff, Glamorgan to Panama City.
Queen of the West	United Kingdom	The ship was wrecked in St Francis Bay before 22 June with the loss of all hands. She was on a voyage from Bombay, India to Liverpool.
