= List of shipwrecks in 1788 =

The List of shipwrecks in 1788 includes some ships sunk, wrecked or otherwise lost during 1788.

table of contents
1788
Jan	Feb	Mar	Apr
May	Jun	Jul	Aug
Sep	Oct	Nov	Dec
Unknown date

== January ==
=== 7 January ===
List of shipwrecks: 7 January 1788
Ship	State	Description
Charlotte	British East India Company	The sloop was wrecked on the east coast of Krakatoa. She was on a voyage from Bombay, India to China.

=== 17 January ===
List of shipwrecks: 17 January 1788
Ship	State	Description
Delight	Great Britain	The ship foundered in the English Channel off Dartmouth, Devon. Her crew were rescued. She was on a voyage from Portland, Dorset to Bridgwater, Somerset.

=== 18 January ===
List of shipwrecks: 18 January 1788
Ship	State	Description
Experiment	Great Britain	The ship was wrecked near Rotterdam, South Holland, Dutch Republic. She was on a voyage from Stockholm, Sweden to Rotterdam.
Unnamed	Great Britain	The flat was driven ashore in Carnarvon Bay. She was on a voyage from Biddeford, Devon to Lancaster, Lancashire
Unnamed	Great Britain	The sloop was driven ashore in Carnarvon Bay. She was on a voyage from Cork, Ireland to Liverpool, Lancashire.

=== 21 January ===
List of shipwrecks: 21 January 1788
Ship	State	Description
Mary	Great Britain	The ship was wrecked in the Isles of Scilly while on a voyage from Truro, Cornwall to Swansea, Glamorgan.

=== Unknown date ===
List of shipwrecks: Unknown date in January 1788
Ship	State	Description
Active	Ireland	The ship was lost whilst on a voyage from Cork to Lisbon, Portugal. Her crew were rescued.
Ann	Great Britain	The ship was wrecked on Sicily. She was on a voyage from Ancona, Papal States to London.
Alexander	Great Britain	The ship was driven ashore 5 nautical miles (9.3 km) south of Hoylake, Cheshire. She was on a voyage from King's Lynn, Norfolk to Liverpool, Lancashire.
Anna Margretta	Dutch Republic	The ship was lost at Marseille, France. She was on a voyage from Marseille to Ostend.
Betsey	Great Britain	The ship was lost in the Isles of Scilly. Her crew were rescued.
Conway	(Kingdom of Great Britain) Jersey	The ship was wrecked on Jersey with the loss of her captain. She was on a voyage from Bilbao, Spain to Jersey.
Dowson	Great Britain	The ship was lost in the Isles of Scilly. Her crew were rescued.
Duke of Cornwall	Great Britain	The ship was driven ashore in the Isles of Scilly.
Elizabeth	Great Britain	The ship foundered in the Atlantic Ocean north west of the Isles of Scilly. All on board were rescued She was on a voyage from Quebec, British America to Cork, Ireland and Newcastle upon Tyne, Northumberland.
Fame	Great Britain	The ship foundered in the Irish Sea off the Welsh coast. Her crew were rescued. She was on a voyage from Liverpool to London.
Farmer and Janet	Great Britain	The ship was driven ashore and wrecked at Hollesley, Suffolk. She was on a voyage from the Firth of Forth to London.
Friends	Great Britain	The ship was wrecked on the coast of Cornwall. She was on a voyage from Rouen, France to Swansea, Glamorgan.
Industry	Great Britain	The ship was wrecked on the coast of Flanders, Dutch Republic.
Jackie	Great Britain	The ship was driven ashore at Ostend. She was on a voyage from Glasgow, Renfrewshire to Ostend.
John & Hannah	Great Britain	The ship was wrecked on The Skerries. She was on a voyage from Youghal, County Cork, Ireland to Whitehaven, Cumberland.
Jonge Peter	Dutch Republic	The ship foundered off North Foreland, Kent, Great Britain. She was on a voyage from London to Amsterdam.
Louise	France	The ship was driven ashore and severely damaged at the mouth of the Garonne. She was on a voyage from Saint-Domingue to Bordeaux.
Mary	Great Britain	The ship was lost in the Isles of Scilly. She was on a voyage from Truro, Cornwall to Swansea.
Minerva	(Kingdom of Great Britain) Guernsey	The ship spran a leak and was abandoned by her crew. They were rescued by Fowey (Great Britain). Minerva was on a voyage from Hythe to Cherbourg, France.
New Loyalty	Great Britain	The ship was driven ashore at Dundrum, County Down, Ireland. She was on a voyage from Liverpool to Belfast, County Antrim, Ireland.
Nimrod	Great Britain	Whaler belonging to Mather & Co. lost in the Falkland Islands. Waterford Packet (Great Britain) rescued her crew and took them to Faial.
Two Brothers	Great Britain	The ship foundered in the English Channel off Ramhead. She was on a voyage from Weymouth, Dorset to Plymouth, Devon.
Two Brothers	Great Britain	The ship sank in the River Seine at Rouen, France. She was on a voyage from London to Rouen.

== February ==
=== 14 February ===
List of shipwrecks: 14 February 1788
Ship	State	Description
Mersey	Great Britain	The ship was wrecked on the Wicklow Bank, in the Irish Sea with the loss of two of her crew. She was on a voyage from Liverpool, Lancashire to Charleston, South Carolina, United States.

=== Unknown date ===
List of shipwrecks: Unknown date in February 1788
Ship	State	Description
Ann	Great Britain	The ship was driven ashore at Ayre. She was on a voyage from Virginia, United States to the Clyde.
Brothers	Ireland	The ship was lost near Sligo. She was on a voyage from New York, United States to Sligo.
Goed Verwachting	Dutch Republic	The ship was driven ashore in the Vlie. She was on a voyage from Bordeaux, France to Amsterdam.
Hawke	Ireland	The ship foundered in the Irish Sea off Holyhead, Anglesey, Great Britain with the loss of two of her crew. She was on a voyage from Cádiz, Spain to Dublin.
Heart of Oak	Great Britain	The ship was lost whilst of a voyage from Carmarthen to Falmouth, Cornwall.
Hersterling	Great Britain	The ship was wrecked at Faro, Portugal. She was on a voyage from Cádiz, Spain to Amsterdam.
Hiligheid	(Denmark) Norway	The ship was lost near Stavanger with the loss of three of her crew. She was on a voyage from Christiansand to Copenhagen, Denmark.
Nancy	Great Britain	The ship was driven ashore near Weymouth, Dorset. She was on a voyage from London to Liverpool, Lancashire.
Neptune	Great Britain	The ship foundered off the Arklow Bank, in the Irish Sea. She was on a voyage from London to Dublin.
Nile	Great Britain	The ship was driven ashore near Marseille, France, and was abandoned by her crew. She was later refloated and taken in to Marseille. Nile was on a voyage from London to Gibraltar and Nice, France.
Pallas	Great Britain	The ship was wrecked 20 leagues (60 nautical miles (110 km)) from Greenock, Renfrewshire. She was on a voyage from Cork, Ireland to Greenock.
Patriot	Hamburg	The ship was lost near Cuxhaven. She was on a voyage from Bordeaux to Hamburg.
Polly	Great Britain	The ship was driven ashore on the coast of Suffolk. She was on a voyage from London to Gainsborough, Lincolnshire.
Sally	Ireland	The ship was wrecked on the Arklow Bank. She was on a voyage from Cork to Belfast, County Antrim.
Sun	Great Britain	The ship was wrecked on the Goodwin Sands, Kent. Her crew were rescued. She was on a voyage from Emden, Hanover to Liverpool.
Twee Goed Broeders	Dutch Republic	The ship was lost near Orfordness, Suffolk. She was on a voyage from Groningen to London.
William and Mary	Great Britain	The ship was driven ashore and wrecked near Strangford, County Antrim. She was on a voyage from Ross-on-Wye, Herefordshire to Londonderry.

== March ==
=== 5 March ===
List of shipwrecks: 5 March 1788
Ship	State	Description
Francis	Great Britain	The ship was wrecked on the Goodwin Sands, Kent while on a voyage from Newcastle-upon-Tyne, Northumberland to Bordeaux, France.

=== 14 March ===
List of shipwrecks: 14 March 1788
Ship	State	Description
Epanronidas	Dutch Republic	African slave trade: The dogger was seized by the nineteen slaves on board. They murdered all but two of the crew and ran the ship ashore 2 nautical miles (3.7 km) south of Cape Sierra Leone. The ship was wrecked.

=== 23 March ===
List of shipwrecks: 23 March 1788
Ship	State	Description
Brothers	Great Britain	The ship was driven ashore and wrecked at Whitby, Yorkshire.
Good-Intent	Great Britain	The ship was driven ashore at Whitby. She was on a voyage from Glasgow, Renfrewshire to Rotterdam, Dutch Republic.

=== 31 March ===
List of shipwrecks: 31 March 1788
Ship	State	Description
Richard	Great Britain	The full-rigged ship was wrecked off Saint Andrew, Jamaica. All on board survived. She was on a voyage from Montego Bay, Jamaica to Bluefields, Jamaica.
Unnamed	Flag unknown	The schooner was wrecked on the Musqueteers. Her crew were rescued.

=== Unknown date ===
List of shipwrecks: Unknown date in March 1788
Ship	State	Description
Ann	Great Britain	The ship was driven ashore between Falsterbo and Ystad, Sweden. She was on a voyage from Königsberg, Prussia to Hull, Yorkshire.
Anna Maria Ann	Ireland	The ship was driven ashore and wrecked in Killina Bay, County Cork. Her crew were rescued. She was on a voyage from New York, United States to Dublin.
Dilligence	Great Britain	The ship was wrecked on the French coast. She was on a voyage from London to Saint-Valery-sur-Somme, France.
Fame	Great Britain	The ship was driven ashore and wrecked at Pool, Dorset and wrecked. She was on a voyage from Pool to Newfoundland, British America.
Marechal de Mouchy	France	The ship was wrecked on the Île de Ré. She was on a voyage from the West Indies to Bordeaux.
Mary	Great Britain	The ship was driven ashore and wrecked near Weymouth, Dorset. She was on a voyage from Newcastle upon Tyne, Northumberland to Weymouth.
Rebecca	Great Britain	The ship capsized in the River Ribble. She was on a voyage from Saint Kitts to Lancaster, Lancashire.
St. Julian	Spain	The ship was wrecked on the Los Galgos rocks, west of A Coruña with the loss of one of the 33 people on board in late March. Survivors were rescued by the packet ship English (Great Britain).
Wallfish	Great Britain	The ship was lost in the Regesfjord, Sweden.
Union	Great Britain	The ship struck a rock and foundered off Ouessant, France. She was on a voyage from Bordeaux to Liverpool, Lancashire.

== April ==
=== 1 April ===
List of shipwrecks: 1 April 1788
Ship	State	Description
Betsey	Great Britain	The ship struck the pier and sank at Ramsgate, Kent.

=== 3 April ===
List of shipwrecks: 3 April 1788
Ship	State	Description
Mally	Great Britain	The ship was lost at Holyhead, Anglesey. Her crew were rescued. She was on a voyage from Youghall, County Cork, Ireland to Liverpool, Lancashire.

=== 16 April ===
List of shipwrecks: 16 April 1788
Ship	State	Description
Unnamed	Great Britain	The sloop was wrecked near Lundy Island, Devon. Her crew were rescued by Industry (Ireland). The sloop was on a voyage from Barmouth, Carnarvonshire to Newry, County Antrim, Ireland.

=== 28 April ===
List of shipwrecks: 28 April 1788
Ship	State	Description
Wade	Great Britain	The ship was abandoned in the Atlantic Ocean. Her crew were rescued by Success (Great Britain). Wade came ashore and was wrecked at Newport Pratt, County Mayo, Ireland. Thirteen people drowned when their boat capsized going to the assistance of Wade.

=== 29 April ===
List of shipwrecks: 29 April 1788
Ship	State	Description
Earl of Chatham	Great Britain	The ship was lost on the island of Sanday in the Orkney Islands. All 56 people on board survived. Formerly known as HMS Hind.

=== Unknown date ===
List of shipwrecks: Unknown date in April 1788
Ship	State	Description
Benjamin	Great Britain	The ship was lost near Saint-Valery-sur-Somme, France. She was on a voyage from London to Saint-Valery-sur-Somme.
Jane and Eleanor	Great Britain	The ship sank at Ramsgate, Kent, She was on a voyage from London to Barmouth, Caernarfonshire.
Kitty	France	The ship was dismasted and was abandoned by her crew. She was later taken in to Ramsgate. Kitty was on a voyage from London to Le Havre.
Norfolk	Great Britain	The ship was lost near the mouth of the Humber with the loss of all hands. She was on a voyage from Liverpool, Lancashire to Ostend, Dutch Republic.
Providence	Great Britain	The ship was driven ashore near Margate, Kent. She was on a voyage from Sunderland, County Durham to Newhaven, Sussex.
Vigilantia	Dutch Republic	The ship was lost near Camaret-sur-Mer, France. She was on a voyage from Ostend to Nantes, France.

== May ==
=== 3 May ===
List of shipwrecks: 3 May 1788
Ship	State	Description
Good Hope	Great Britain	The ship ran aground on the Anholt Reef. She was on a voyage from Lisbon, Portugal to Saint Petersburg, Russia.

=== 10 May ===
List of shipwrecks: 10 May 1788
Ship	State	Description
Harriot	Great Britain	The ship ran agound off Fort Augusta, Jamaica. She was refloated on 12 May.

=== 16 May ===
List of shipwrecks: 16 May 1788
Ship	State	Description
Marechal de Castries	France	The ship was wrecked on the African coast. She was on a voyage from the Île de France, Mauritius to L'Orient.

=== Unknown date ===
List of shipwrecks: Unknown date in May 1788
Ship	State	Description
Dick	Great Britain	The ship was lost in the Benin River.
Godfrey	Great Britain	The ship was lost near New Romney, Kent.
Maria Elizabeth	Bremen	The ship was driven ashore at Memel, Prussia. She was on a voyage from Stettin to Memel.
Russia Merchant	Great Britain	The ship was driven ashore on "The Spit". She was on a voyage from Memel to Bristol, Gloucestershire.
William and Mary	Great Britain	The ship was lost on the Dutch coast. She was on a voyage from Carolina, United States to Cowes, Isle of Wight and Bremen.

== June ==
=== 7 June ===
List of shipwrecks: 7 June 1788
Ship	State	Description
Unnamed vessel	United States	The Virginian sailing vessel was lost in the Gilstone area of the Western Rocks, Isles of Scilly.

=== Unknown date ===
List of shipwrecks: Unknown date in June 1788
Ship	State	Description
Ann	Great Britain	The ship sprang a leak and was beached on Öland, Sweden. Her crew were rescued. She was on a voyage from Saint Petersburg, Russia to Hull, Yorkshire.
Friendship	Great Britain	The ship foundered in the Atlantic Ocean off the coast of Portugal while on a voyage from Penryn, Cornwall to Gibraltar.
Hector	Ireland	The ship was lost on the west coast of Ireland. She was on a voyage from New York, United States to Newry, County Antrim.

== July ==
=== 22 July ===
List of shipwrecks: 22 July 1788
Ship	State	Description
Aurora	Great Britain	The ship was lost at Peniche, Portugal. She was on a voyage from London to Lisbon, Portugal.

=== 23 July ===
List of shipwrecks: 23 July 1788
Ship	State	Description
Fanny	United States	The sloop was driven ashore and wrecked at Ocracock, North Carolina.
Favourite John	Ireland	The ship was driven ashore and wrecked at Norfolk, Virginia, United States.
Hero	Great Britain	The brig was driven ashore at Norfolk.
Mermaid	Great Britain	The ship was driven ashore at Norfolk.
Nancy	United States	The sloop was driven ashore at Ocracock.
Polly	United States	The schooner was driven ashore and dismasted at Ocracock.
Reward	Great Britain	The ship was driven ashore on Marsh Island, North Carolina.

=== 24 July ===
List of shipwrecks: 24 July 1788
Ship	State	Description
Federalist	United States	The miniature ship sank in a storm while moored in the Potomac River near Mount Vernon shortly after being delivered as a gift to George Washington.

=== Unknown date ===
List of shipwrecks: Unknown date in July 1788
Ship	State	Description
Anna	Great Britain	The ship was lost near Land's End, Cornwall. She was on a voyage from Bristol, Gloucestershire to a Baltic port.
Ellen	Great Britain	The ship ran aground and was severely damaged at Liverpool, Lancashire. She was on a voyage from Jamaica to Liverpool.
Endracht	Hamburg	The ship was driven ashore and wrecked near Great Yarmouth, Norfolk, Great Britain. Her crew were rescued. She was on a voyage from Hamburg to Brest, France.
Fort William	Great Britain	The ship capsized in the North Sea with the loss of two lives. She was on a voyage from Hamburg to Porto, Portugal.
Hope	Ireland	The ship was driven ashore near Blackrock, Dublin. She was on a voyage from Liverpool to Cork and Newfoundland, British America.
Six Sisters	Great Britain	The ship was driven ashore near Ostend, Dutch Republic. She was on a voyage from Liverpool, Lancashire to Ostend.
Triton	Great Britain	The ship ran aground on the Lap Shoal and was severely damaged. She was on a voyage from Zant, Republic of Venice to Stettin. Triton was taken in to Copenhagen, Denmark for repairs.

== August ==
=== 10 August ===
List of shipwrecks: 10 August 1788
Ship	State	Description
Vozmislav (Возмислав)	Imperial Russian Navy	The frigate was driven ashore and wrecked on Naissaar with the loss of one crew member.

=== 16 August ===
List of shipwrecks: 16 August 1788
Ship	State	Description
Fortitude	Great Britain	The ship foundered in the North Sea. Her crew were rescued. She was on a voyage from Saint Petersburg, Russia to London.
La Blonde	French Navy	The frigate was driven ashore in a hurricane at Port-au-Prince, Hispaniola and was wrecked.
Trois Frères	France	The ship was wrecked at Port-au-Prince. She was on a voyage from Angola to Le Havre.
Two unnamed vessels	France	The Guineamen capsized in a hurricane at Port-au-Prince.
Unnamed	France	The schooner capsized in a hurricane at Port-au-Prince.
'Fifteen unnamed vessels	United States	The ships capsized in a hurricane at Port-au-Prince.
Unnamed	France	The sloop foundered in a hurricane off Hispaniola.
Seven unnamed vessels	France	The ships were wrecked in a hurricane at Gonaïve, Hispaniola.

=== Unknown date ===
List of shipwrecks: Unknown date in August 1788
Ship	State	Description
Amable Suzette	France	The ship was lost near Port-au-Prince, Saint-Domingue.
Tycho de Brake	Danzig	The ship was lost in the Orkney Islands, Great Britain. She was on a voyage from Danzig to Liverpool, Lancashire, Great Britain.
Ulysses	Prussia	The ship was wrecked on the Isle of Man. She was on a voyage from Memel to Liverpool.

== September ==
=== 8 September ===
List of shipwrecks: 8 September 1788
Ship	State	Description
Dobroye Namereniye (Доброе Намерение, 'Good Intention')	Imperial Russian Navy	The ship was driven ashore at Okhotsk. She was burnt the next day. Her crew were rescued.

=== 20 September ===
List of shipwrecks: 20 September 1788
Ship	State	Description
John and Samuel	Great Britain	The ship ran aground on the Haisborough Sands, in the North Sea off the coast of Norfolk and was severely damaged. She was on a voyage from Danzig to Málaga, Spain. John and Samuel was anchored off Great Yarmouth, Norfolk.

=== 22 September ===
List of shipwrecks: 22 September 1788
Ship	State	Description
Unnamed	Denmark	The yacht was driven ashore was driven ashore and wrecked between Helsingør and Snekkersten.

=== 28 September ===
List of shipwrecks: 28 September 1788
Ship	State	Description
Betsey	Great Britain	The ship departed from North Carolina, United States for the West Indies. No further trace, presumed foundered with the loss of all hands.

=== Unknown date ===
List of shipwrecks: Unknown date in September 1788
Ship	State	Description
Ann	Great Britain	The ship was driven ashore in the River Severn at Newnham's Nab, Gloucestershire. She was on a voyage from Newnham, Gloucestershire to Chepstow, Monmouthshire.
Dorothea	Stettin	The ship was driven ashore and wrecked at Caister-on-Sea, Norfolk, Great Britain. She was on a voyage from Stettin to London, Great Britain.
Fortuna	Stettin	The ship was lost in the Kattegat. She was on a voyage from Stettin to Bristol, Gloucestershire, Great Britain.
Hope	Great Britain	The ship was lost near Land's End, Cornwall. She was on a voyage from Savannah, Georgia, United States to Bristol.
Polly	Great Britain	The ship was lost on "Handay Island" with the loss of all hands. She was on a voyage from Aberdeen to Livorno, Tuscany.

== October ==
=== 5 October ===
List of shipwrecks: 5 October 1788
Ship	State	Description
Enigkeit	Stettin	The ship was lost on the "Island of Zylh". She was on a voyage from Stettin to London, Great Britain.

=== 8 October ===
List of shipwrecks: 8 October 1788
Ship	State	Description
Unnamed	Great Britain	The ship foundered in the English Channel off Plymouth, Devon. Her crew were rescued.

=== 9 October ===
List of shipwrecks: 9 October 1788
Ship	State	Description
De Jonge Frederick	Dutch Republic	The ship was lost on the Long Sand, in the North Sea off the coast of Essex, Great Britain. She was on a voyage from Riga, Russia to Nantes, France.

=== 11 October ===
List of shipwrecks: 11 October 1788
Ship	State	Description
Hope	Great Britain	The ship was wrecked at Skagen, Denmark.

=== 24 October ===
List of shipwrecks: 24 October 1788
Ship	State	Description
Patience	Great Britain	The ship was wrecked near Port Patrick, Wigtownshire. She was on a voyage from Saint Petersburg, Russia to Liverpool, Lancashire.

=== Unknown date ===
List of shipwrecks: Unknown date in October 1788
Ship	State	Description
Alfred	Great Britain	The ship was lost in Tramore Bay. She was on a voyage from Newfoundland, British America to Dartmouth, Devon.
Ann and Elizabeth	Great Britain	The ship was driven ashore and wrecked at North Foreland, Kent. She was on a voyage from Ostend, Dutch Republic to London.
Britannia	Great Britain	The ship was wrecked on the Falsterbo Reef, Sweden. She was on a voyage from Liverpool, Lancashire to Libava, Duchy of Courland and Semigallia.
Endeavour	Great Britain	The ship was driven ashore at Ostend. Her crew were rescued. She was on a voyage from Sunderland, County Durham to Ostend. She was later refloated and taken in to Ostend.
Henrietta	Stettin	The ship was lost near Heligoland. She was on a voyage from Stettin to Bordeaux, France.
Isabella	Great Britain	The ship was driven ashore near Christiania, Norway with the loss of a crew member. She was on a voyage from Danzig to Perth.
Jane and James	Great Britain	The ship was wrecked on the Burbo Bank, in Liverpool Bay. She was on a voyage from Strangford, County Antrim, Ireland to Liverpool.
Matilda Maria	Dutch Republic	The ship was driven ashore at Ostend and severely damaged. She was on a voyage from Ostend to Bengal, India. Matilda Maria subsequently put into Portsmouth, Hampshire, Great Britain.
Minerva	Stettin	The ship was lost near Skagen, Denmark. She was on a voyage from Stettin to Bordeaux.
Nancy	Great Britain	The ship was wrecked on the Runnel Stone. Her crew were rescued. She was on a voyage from Saint Petersburg to Bristol, Gloucestershire.
Norwich	Great Britain	The ship was driven ashore and wrecked at Memel, Prussia. She was on a voyage from London to Memel.
Olive	Great Britain	The ship foundered whilst on a voyage from Mogadore, Morocco to London. Her crew were rescued by Miller (Great Britain).
Shetland	Great Britain	The ship was lost in the Shetland Islands. She was on a voyage from the Shetland Islands to Great Yarmouth, Norfolk.
Susannah	Great Britain	The ship was lost near Libava. She was on a voyage from Saint Petersburg to Le Havre, France.
Welcome Messenger	Great Britain	The ship was lost near "Wingo". She was on a voyage from Portsmouth to Saint Petersburg.

== November ==
=== 3 November ===
List of shipwrecks: 3 November 1788
Ship	State	Description
Bella	Great Britain	The ship foundered 25 leagues (75 nautical miles (139 km)) off The Lizard, Cornwall. Her crew were rescued. She was on a voyage from Stockholm, Sweden to Bordeaux, France.
William	(Kingdom of Great Britain) Isle of Man	The ship was wrecked in Sheep Haven Bay. Her crew were rescued.

=== 5 November ===
List of shipwrecks: 5 November 1788
Ship	State	Description
Industry	Great Britain	The ship departed from Boston, Lincolnshire for Liverpool, Lancashire. No further trace, presumed foundered with the loss of all hands.

=== 6 November ===
List of shipwrecks: 6 November 1788
Ship	State	Description
Nelly	Great Britain	The ship was driven ashore at Castletown, Isle of Man. Her crew were rescued. She was on a voyage from Liverpool, Lancashire to Londonderry, Ireland.

=== 14 November ===
List of shipwrecks: 14 November 1788
Ship	State	Description
Bordeloise	France	The ship capsized in the Garonne. She was on a voyage from Saint-Domingue to Bordeaux.

=== 15 November ===
List of shipwrecks: 15 November 1788
Ship	State	Description
Annabella	Great Britain	The ship was driven ashore at Zirkza, near Kronstadt, Russia and was wrecked. Her crew were rescued.
Elizabeth	Great Britain	The ship was wrecked at Pillau, Pussia. Her crew were rescued.

=== 16 November ===
List of shipwrecks: 19 November 1788
Ship	State	Description
Unnamed	Flag unknown	The cutter was run ashore and wrecked in Arnhill Bay whilst trying to avoid being captured by HMRC Royal George (Great Britain).

=== 19 November ===
List of shipwrecks: 19 November 1788
Ship	State	Description
Friends	Great Britain	The ship was wrecked on Scroby Sands, Norfolk. She was on a voyage from Saint Petersburg, Russia to London.

=== 27 November ===
List of shipwrecks: 27 November 1788
Ship	State	Description
Bridget	Ireland	The ship was driven ashore and wrecked at Castletown, Isle of Man with the loss of five of her thirteen crew.

=== 28 November ===
List of shipwrecks: 28 November 1788
Ship	State	Description
Tarleton	Great Britain	The ship foundered in the Irish Sea off St David's Head, Pembrokeshire. Her crew were rescued. She was on a voyage from Liverpool, Lancashire, to Africa.

=== 30 November ===
List of shipwrecks: 30 November 1788
Ship	State	Description
Dnepr (Днепр)	Imperial Russian Navy	The transport ship was holed by ice and sank in the Dnieper–Bug estuary. Her crew were rescued.
Krichev (Кричев)	Imperial Russian Navy	The transport ship was holed by ice and sank in the Dnieper–Bug estuary. Her crew were rescued.
Vasily Veliky (Василий Великий, 'Basil the Great')	Imperial Russian Navy	The Pyaty-class frigate was driven aground and holed by ice and sank off the Kinburn Spit. Her crew were rescued.
No. 2	Russia	The lighter was holed by ice and sank in the Dnieper–Bug estuary. Her crew were rescued.
Unnamed	Imperial Russian Navy	The floating battery was holed by ice and sank sank in the Dnieper–Bug estuary. Her crew survived.

=== Unknown date ===
List of shipwrecks: Unknown date in November 1788
Ship	State	Description
Baltick	Great Britain	The ship was lost near Reval, Russia. She was on a voyage from Saint Petersburg, Russia to London.
Betsey	Great Britain	The ship foundered in the Atlantic Ocean off Cape St. Vincent Portugal. Her crew were rescued. She was on a voyage from Málaga, Spain to London.
Commerce	Great Britain	The ship was lost near the Haisborough Gut in the North Sea off the coast of Norfolk. She was on a voyage from Saint Petersburg to London.
Countess of Hopetown	Great Britain	The ship was lost in the North Sea. She was on a voyage from Saint Petersburg to Leith, Lothian.
Diamond	Great Britain	The light collier was lost whilst on a voyage from Cork, Ireland to Workington, Cumberland with the loss of two of her crew.
Eliza	Great Britain	The ship was driven ashore and wrecked near Lowestoft, Suffolk. She was on a voyage from Königsberg, Prussia to London.
Fredrick van Bergen	Prussia	The ship ran aground off Great Yarmouth, Norfolk, Great Britain. She was on a voyage from Pillau to London.
Friends	Great Britain	Captain Maxwell's ship was wrecked off Great Yarmouth She was on a voyage from Saint Petersburg to London.
Friends	Great Britain	Captain Park's ship was wrecked on the Gunfleet Sand, in the North Sea off the coast of Essex. She was on a voyage from Saint Petersburg to London.
Jonge Ruerd Dick	Dutch Republic	The ship departed from Stockholm, Sweden for Amsterdam. No further trace, presumed foundered with the loss of all hands.
Jonge Vrow Berent Diena	Dutch Republic	The ship was wrecked on the Pan Sand, in the North Sea. She was on a voyage from "Apingaandam" to London.
Judith and Jane	Great Britain	The ship was driven ashore near Ostend, West Flanders, Dutch Republic.
Mary	Great Britain	The ship foundered in the Atlantic Ocean off Land's End, Cornwall. She was on a voyage from Neath, Glamorgan to Plymouth, Devon.
Mary and Michael	Great Britain	The ship was lost in the Orkney Islands. She was on a voyage from Liverpool, Lancashire to King's Lynn, Norfolk.
Nossa Senhora da Conceição	Portugal	The ship was driven ashore near Ventava, Duchy of Courland and Semigallia. She was on a voyage from Saint Petersburg to Porto.
Plain Dealing	Great Britain	The ship was lost at Campbeltown, Argyllshire. She was on a voyage from Liverpool to Coleraine, County Antrim, Ireland.
Polly	Great Britain	The ship was wrecked near Valencia, Spain with the loss of six of her crew. She was on a voyage from Newfoundland, British America to Barcelona, Spain.
Resolution	Great Britain	The ship was lost near Reval, Russia. She was on a voyage from Saint Petersburg to Liverpool.
Robert	Ireland	The ship was driven ashore in the River Foyle. She was on a voyage from Londonderry to Rotterdam, Dutch Republic.
Sisters	Great Britain	The ship was wrecked near Ostend. She was on a voyage from London to Ostend.
St Juan Baptista	Spain	The ship was lost on the Spanish coast. She was on a voyage from Bilbao to Bristol, Gloucestershire, Greqat Britain.
Trial	Great Britain	The ship was driven ashore at Libava, Duchy of Courland and Semigallia. She was on a voyage from Landskrona to Helsingfors, Sweden.
Two Brothers	Great Britain	The ship was lost near Lowestoft.

== December ==
=== 2 December ===
List of shipwrecks: 2 December 1788
Ship	State	Description
Amazon	Great Britain	The ship was wrecked on a sandbank off Great Yarmouth, Norfolk with the loss of all hands. She was on a voyage from Stockholm, Sweden to Alicante, Spain.

=== 3 December ===
List of shipwrecks: 3 December 1788
Ship	State	Description
Good-Intent	Great Britain	The ship was driven ashore at Gibraltar. She was later refloated. She was refloated in January 1789.
Heart of Oak	Great Britain	The ship was driven ashore at Gibraltar. She was later refloated. She was refloated in January 1789.

=== 6 December ===
List of shipwrecks: 6 December 1788
Ship	State	Description
Friends Industry	Great Britain	The ship was lost near Lisbon, Portugal with the loss of two of her crew. She was on a voyage from London to France and Jamaica.
Rachael	Great Britain	The ship was driven ashore in the River Thames near Northfleet, Kent.

=== 7 December ===
List of shipwrecks: 7 December 1788
Ship	State	Description
Ranger	Great Britain	The crewless sloop was wrecked on the Sandwich Flats.

=== 9 December ===
List of shipwrecks: 9 December 1788
Ship	State	Description
Señora de Rozario St Joze E Almas	Spain	The ship departed from Viveiro for Viana do Castelo, Portugal. No further trace, presumed foundered with the loss of all hands.

=== 11 December ===
List of shipwrecks: 11 December 1788
Ship	State	Description
Lady Hannah	Great Britain	The ship was lost at Madeira. She was on a voyage from Quebec, British America to Madeira.

=== 14 December ===
List of shipwrecks: 14 December 1788
Ship	State	Description
Active	Great Britain	The ship was driven ashore and wrecked at Great Yarmouth, Norfolk. She was on a voyage from London to King's Lynn, Norfolk.
Beckford	Great Britain	The ship was driven ashore and wrecked south of Great Yarmouth. She was on a voyage from Great Yarmouth to Barcelona, Spain.
Duchess of Buccleugh	Great Britain	The ship ran aground on the Cockle Sand, in the North Sea off the coast of Norfolk and was wrecked. She was on a voyage from Leith, Lothian to London.

=== 16 December ===
List of shipwrecks: 16 December 1788
Ship	State	Description
Benn	Great Britain	The ship was driven ashore at Ramsgate Kent. She was on a voyage from Whitehaven, Cumberland to Rotterdam, Dutch Republic. She was later refloated.

=== 19 December ===
List of shipwrecks: |date= required
Ship	State	Description
Four Brothers	Great Britain	The ship sprang a leak and was abandoned in the Atlantic Ocean (50°17′N 12°27′W). Her crew were rescued by Trimmer (Ireland). Four Brothers was on a voyage from Liverpool, Lancashire to London.

=== 23 December ===
List of shipwrecks: 23 December 1788
Ship	State	Description
HMRC Prince of Wales	Great Britain	The revenue cutter ran aground off Girvan, Ayrshire and was wrecked. Her crew were rescued.

=== 29 December ===
List of shipwrecks: 29 December 1788
Ship	State	Description
Friendship	Ireland	The ship was wrecked at Cork.

=== 31 December ===
List of shipwrecks: 31 December 1788
Ship	State	Description
Vénus	French Navy	The Hébé-class frigate was wrecked in the Indian Ocean.

=== Unknown date ===
List of shipwrecks: Unknown date in December 1788
Ship	State	Description
Bridget	(Kingdom of Great Britain) Guernsey	The ship was lost on the Irish coast. She was on a voyage from Guernsey to Cork, Ireland.
Catherine	Great Britain	The ship was lost near Valencia, Spain with the loss of all but two of her crew.
Centurion	Great Britain	The ship was driven ashore on South Holm, Denmark.
HMS Crown	Royal Navy	The third rate ran aground on the Goodwin Sands, Kent. She was refloated.
Dannebrog	(Denmark) Danish Asiatic Company	The East Indiaman was driven ashore by ice in the Øresund.
Esperance	France	The ship was driven ashore on the British coast. She was on a voyage from Saint Petersburg, Russia to London, Great Britain. She was refloated and taken in to Harwich, Essex, Great Britain.
Fly	Great Britain	The ship was driven ashore and wrecked at Cape Trafalgar, Spain. She was on a voyage from Liverpool, Lancashire to the Isle of Man and Livorno, Grand Duchy of Tuscany.
Four Brothers	Great Britain	The ship foundered. Her crew were rescued by Mary (Great Britain). Four Brothers was on a voyage from Liverpool to London.
Friendship	Ireland	The ship was driven ashore near Cork. She was on a voyage from Cork to the Strait of Gibraltar.
General Elliot	Great Britain	The whaler sprang a leak and put into Saint Helena, where she was wrecked.
Hero	Great Britain	The whaler foundered in the English Channel off Jersey, Channel Islands with the loss of all hands. She was on a voyage from London to Jersey and the South Seas.
Industry	Great Britain	The ship was wrecked on the North Brake Head. Her crew were rescued.
Jonge Jan Dockson	Dutch Republic	The ship was driven ashore near Elsinore, Denmark. She was on a voyage from Saint Petersburg, Russia to Amsterdam.
Jonge Wilhelm	(Sweden) Swedish Pomerania	The ship was driven ashore at Rügenwalde. She was on a voyage from Dublin, Ireland to Rügenwalde.
Liberty	Great Britain	The ship was driven ashore in Freshwater Bay, Isle of Wight with the loss of all hands. She was on a voyage from Málaga, Spain to London. Liberty was later taken in to Portsmouth, Hampshire.
Liberty	Great Britain	The ship struck a rock off the Isle of Arran and sank. She was on a voyage from Nova Scotia, British America to Jersey, Channel Islands.
Martha	Great Britain	The ship was lost in Riga Bay.
Mary	Great Britain	The ship was lost off Winterton-on-Sea, Norfolk. She was on a voyage from Gothenburg, Sweden to London.
Morant	Great Britain	The ship was wrecked on the Key of the Cockscombs, off the North Cuban coast. She was on a voyage from Jamaica to Bristol. Trelawney rescued the crew and brought them into Liverpool in July.
Nautilous	Great Britain	The ship was driven ashore near Pool, Dorset. She was on a voyage from Pool to Bilbao, Spain.
Nymph	Great Britain	The ship was driven ashore and severely damaged in Málaga Bay. She was on a voyage from Chaleur Bay, Newfoundland, British America to Málaga.
Rachel	Great Britain	The ship sank on the Hook Sand, in the English Channel off the coast of Dorset.
Rebecca Wendola	Lübeck	The ship was sunk by ice between Kronstadt and Saint Petersburg.
Serapis	Denmark	The ship was driven ashore near Ostend, Dutch Republic. She was on a voyage from Copenhagen to Ostend.
Smyrna	Great Britain	The galley foundered. Her crew were rescued by Charlotte (Great Britain). Smyrna was on a voyage from Smyrna, Ottoman Empire to a British port.
St. Johannes	Hamburg	The ship was cut by ice. She was on a voyage from Hamburg to London.
St. Joseph	France	The ship was lost near Harwich, Essex, Great Britain. She was on a voyage from Gothenburg to Morlaix.
Success	(Kingdom of Great Britain) Jersey	The ship was lost at San Sebastián, Spain. She was on a voyage from Newfoundland to San Sebastián.
Susannah	Great Britain	The ship foundered in the Atlantic Ocean (49°16′N 5°00′W). her crew were rescued by Juno (Great Britain.
Swallow	Great Britain	The ship was wrecked at Ballyvoile, county Waterford, Ireland.
Three Friends	Russia	The ship was lost near Swinemünde, Swedish Pomerania. She was on a voyage from Saint Petersburg to Bordeaux, France.
Wakende Oog	flag unknown	The ship was driven ashore on Læsø, Denmark. She was on a voyage from London to the Øresund.

== Unknown date ==
List of shipwrecks: Unknown date in 1788
Ship	State	Description
Adriatick	Great Britain	The ship was lost on the Northern Triangles. She was on a voyage from London to Ostend, Dutch Republic and British Honduras.
Amity Hall	Great Britain	The ship was lost at Jamaica. She was on a voyage from London to Jamaica.
Ann	Great Britain	The ship was lost between New Brunswick and Port Shelburne, Nova Scotia, British America. She was on a voyage from London to Port Shelburne.
Arch Dutchess Marie Christine	France	The ship was lost whilst on a voyage from Saint-Domingue to Dunkirk.
Astrolabe	French Navy	The frigate was wrecked in the Solomon Islands after 10 March.
Attempt	Great Britain	The ship was lost in the Falkland Islands.
Baltick	Great Britain	The ship foundered in the Baltic Sea off Reval, Saint Petersburg, Russia while on a voyage from Saint Petersburg to London.
Betsey	Great Britain	The ship was lost on the Musquito Shore. She was on a voyage from New Providence, New Jersey, United States to Florida, New Spain.
Betsey	Great Britain	The sloop was abandoned in the Atlantic Ocean. Her crew were rescued by Rodney (Great Britain). Betsey was on a voyage from Tortola to New York, United States.
Betsy	Great Britain	The ship foundered in the Atlantic Ocean off Cape St. Vincent, Portugal while on a voyage from Málaga, Spain to London. Her crew were rescued.
Betsey and Amy	Great Britain	The ship was wrecked on Long Island, Rhode Island, United States. She was on a voyage from Liverpool, Lancashire to New York.
Boussole	French Navy	The ship was wrecked in the Solomon Islands after 10 March.
Capricieuse	French Navy	The frigate ran aground. She was refloated in 1789.
Chance	Great Britain	The whaler was sunk by ice off the coast of Greenland.
Clementina	Great Britain	The ship was lost on the rock of Chesserow with some loss of life. She was on a voyage from Virginia, United States to Bordeaux, France.
Diligence	Great Britain	The ship was lost in the Grand Banks of Newfoundland. Her crew were rescued. She was on a voyage from Hull, Yorkshire to New York.
Dolphin	United States	The sloop was wrecked on Cape Hatteras, North Carolina before 19 November. Her crew were rescued.
Dudaloy	Great Britain	The ship was lost at "Ladroon" with the loss of 70 lives.
Elizabeth	Prussia	The ship was lost on a voyage from Norway to Königsberg.
Emperor	Great Britain	The ship struck rocks in the Leeward Channel and was damaged beyond repair. She was on a voyage from Rockley Bay to Little Courland Bay, Tobago.
Elizabeth and Mary	Great Britain	The ship was lost at Newfoundland.
Enterprize	Great Britain	The ship was destroyed by fire. She was on a voyage from Boston, Massachusetts, United States to Bristol, Gloucestershire.
Everley	Great Britain	The ship was driven ashore on the Florida Keys, New Spain. She was on a voyage from British Honduras to London.
Fame	Great Britain	The ship was lost near British Honduras. She was on a voyage from British Honduras to London.
Fame	Great Britain	The ship was lost on the coast of New Jersey. She was on a voyage from North Carolina to Falmouth, Cornwall.
Fanny	Great Britain	The ship foundered in the Atlantic Ocean. Her crew were rescued by Calypso (United States). Fanny was on a voyage from Virginia to London or Hull.
Favourite	Great Britain	The ship was lost in the Saint Lawrence River. She was on a voyage from London to Quebec.
Friends	Great Britain	The ship was wrecked on the Gunfleet Sands, in the North Sea off the coast of Essex.
Friendship	Great Britain	The ship foundered while on a voyage from Marseille, France to Baltimore, Maryland, United States.
Friendship	British East India Company	The East Indiaman was lost at Batavia, Dutch East Indies. Her crew were rescued by Alexander ( British East India Company). Friendship was on a voyage from Botany Bay to London.
Hastings	Great Britain	The ship foundered in the China Seas with the loss of most of her crew while on a voyage from China to Bombay, India.
Ioann Zlatoust (Иоанн Златоуст, 'John Chrysostom')	Imperial Russian Navy	The frigate was holed by ice and sank in the Dnieper–Bug estuary in the autumn of 1788.
Juno	United States	The ship sprang a leak and foundered in the Atlantic Ocean. Her crew were rescued. She was on a voyage from Salem, Massachusetts to the Cape of Good Hope.
King Jos	Great Britain	The ship was wrecked on the coast of Africa.
London	Great Britain	The whaler was sunk by ice off the coast of Greenland.
Lord North	Great Britain	The ship was wrecked on Watlings Island, Bahamas. She was on a voyage from Liverpool to New Providence.
Lydia	Great Britain	The ship was lost between Virginia and North Carolina with the loss of most of her crew.
Maria	Dutch East India Company	The East Indiaman was lost at the Cape of Good Hope. Her crew were rescued. She was on a voyage from Batavia, Dutch East Indies to Amsterdam.
Mary	Great Britain	The ship foundered in the Atlantic Ocean off Land's End, Cornwall.
Mary and Jane	Great Britain	The ship was wrecked on the coast of East Florida, New Spain while on a voyage from Jamaica to London. Her crew were rescued.
Nancy	Great Britain	The whaler was sunk by ice off the coast of Greenland.
Neckar	Great Britain	The ship foundered in the China Seas with the loss of most of her crew while on a voyage from China to Bombay.
Nimrod	Great Britain	The ship was wrecked in the Falkland Islands. Her crew were rescued by Waterford Packet (Ireland).
Olive Branch	Great Britain	The ship foundered off the coast of Cuba. Her crew were rescued. She was on a voyage from Jamaica to London.
Peggy	Great Britain	The ship was destroyed by fire at Labrador, British America.
Resolution	Great Britain	The ship foundered in the Baltic Sea off Reval while on a voyage from Saint Petersburg to Liverpool.
Richard	Great Britain	The ship was lost on St Andreas Keys. Her crew were rescued. She was on a voyage from Jamaica to the Musquito Shore.
Robert	Great Britain	The ship was lost on the coast of Cuba. She was on a voyage from Jamaica to Wilmington, Delaware, United States.
San Fernando	Spain	): The ship was wrecked on Corvo Island, Azores.
Santa Rosalina	Spain	The ship was driven ashore on the Delaware Capes, United States. She was on a voyage from Baltimore, Maryland, United States to Havana, Cuba.
Sisters	Great Britain	The ship was wrecked at Ostend.
St. Aubin	Great Britain	The ship was driven ashore and wrecked near "Cape L'Anguille" with the loss of six of her crew.
St John's Paquet	Great Britain	The ship was lost whilst on a voyage from Norman's Pond Kay, Bahamas to North Carolina.
Surate	Bremen	The ship was lost at Charleston, South Carolina, United States. Her crew were rescued. She was on a voyage from Bremen to Charleston.
Susannah	Great Britain	The sloop foundered in the Atlantic Ocean (49°16′N 5°00′W). Her crew were rescued by Juno (Great Britain).
Trial	Great Britain	The ship was wrecked in the Baltic Sea off Ventspils, Duchy of Courland and Semigallia. She was on a voyage from Landskrona, Sweden to Helsinki, Swedish Finland.
Tryal	Great Britain	The ship was wrecked on Newfoundland, British North America.
Walsingham	Great Britain	The ship was lost in the Sunda Strait.
