= Duchess of Buccleuch =

Duchess of Buccleuch is the title given to the wife of the Duke of Buccleuch, but may also be held by a woman in her own right. The title has been held by a number of women, including:

== Duchess in her own right ==
- Anne Scott, 1st Duchess of Buccleuch (1651–1732)

== By marriage ==
- Elizabeth Scott, Duchess of Buccleuch (1743–1827) (1743–1827), wife of Henry Scott, 3rd Duke of Buccleuch
- Charlotte Montagu Douglas Scott, Duchess of Buccleuch (1811–1895), wife of Walter Montagu Douglas Scott, 5th Duke of Buccleuch
- Louisa Montagu Douglas Scott, Duchess of Buccleuch (1836–1912), wife of William Montagu Douglas Scott, 6th Duke of Buccleuch
- Mary Montagu Douglas Scott, Duchess of Buccleuch (1900–1993), wife of Walter Montagu Douglas Scott, 8th Duke of Buccleuch
- Jane Scott, Duchess of Buccleuch (1929–2011), wife of John Scott, 9th Duke of Buccleuch
- Elizabeth Scott, Duchess of Buccleuch (1954–2023), wife of Richard Scott, 10th Duke of Buccleuch

== Other uses ==
- Duchess of Buccleugh (ship), several ships with that name
