= St. Louis Fire of 1849 =

1849 fire in St. Louis, Missouri, US

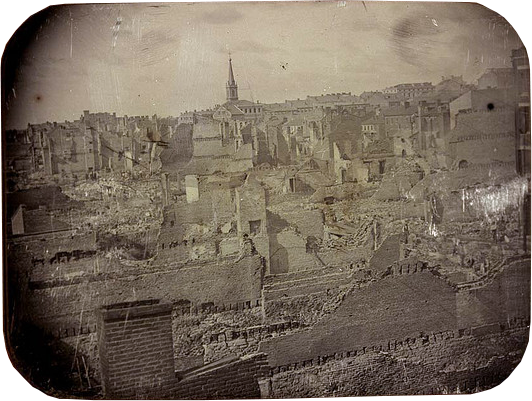
Ruins of the St. Louis Fire of 1849. Daguerreotype by Thomas Martin Easterly.

The St. Louis Fire of 1849 was a devastating fire that occurred on May 17, 1849 and destroyed nearly all of the business district in St. Louis, Missouri. The fire began on a docked steamboat on the Mississippi River and soon spread through the wooden buildings. After volunteer fire fighters could not stop the spread of fire with water, they attempted to create a fire break to protect the cathedral and still-under-construction courthouse. Under the command of Captain Thomas B. Targée, a merchant and auctioneer, men lugged barrels of gunpowder to the corner of Market and second streets. A fatal miscommunication led to Targée's death during the explosions that helped contain the fire. The fire came at a devastating time for the city. A cholera epidemic was raging at the same time. In its May 15 1849 edition, The Saint Louis Daily New Era reported 181 deaths from cholera.

== Timeline of the fire ==
In the spring of 1849, the population of St. Louis was about 63,000 with a western boundary of the city extending to 11th Street. The city was about three quarters of a mile in width and had about three miles of riverfront filled with steamboats and other river craft. St. Louis, located near the junction of the Mississippi and Missouri rivers, was the last major city where travelers could get supplies before they headed west. Here travelers bought supplies and switched steamboats before going up the Missouri River to Omaha, Nebraska or other trail heads for the Oregon Trail and California Trail west. At the time of this fire, the city was also experiencing a cholera epidemic which would end up killing about 10% of the population (over 4,500). The town was booming as people came in from around the U.S. and abroad and bought supplies before heading overland to participate in the California Gold Rush.

On May 17, 1849 at 9:00 p.m. a fire alarm sounded in St. Louis. The fire began when a moored paddle wheeled steamboat White Cloud on the Mississippi river at the foot of Cherry Street caught fire. The fire likely began when a mattress that was airing out on the deck was put away within the boat with an unnoticed ember. The fire quickly spread to another boat, the Edward Bates. The volunteer fire department with nine hand engines and hose reel wagons promptly responded. The moorings holding White Cloud burned through and the burning steamboat drifted slowly down the Mississippi River, setting 22 other steam boats and several flatboats and barges on fire.

The flames leaped from the burning steamboats to buildings on the shore and was soon burning everything on the waterfront levee for four blocks. The fire extended to Main Street westward and crossing Olive Street. It completely gutted the three blocks between Olive and 2nd Street and went as far south as Market Street. It then ignited a large copper shop three blocks away and burned out two more city blocks.

The volunteer firemen, after laboring for eight hours, were nearly completely demoralized and exhausted. The entire business district of the city appeared doomed unless something was done. Six businesses in front of the fire were loaded with kegs of black powder and blown up in succession. Captain Thomas B. Targee of Missouri Company No. 5 died while he was spreading powder into Phillips Music store, the last store chosen to be blown up.

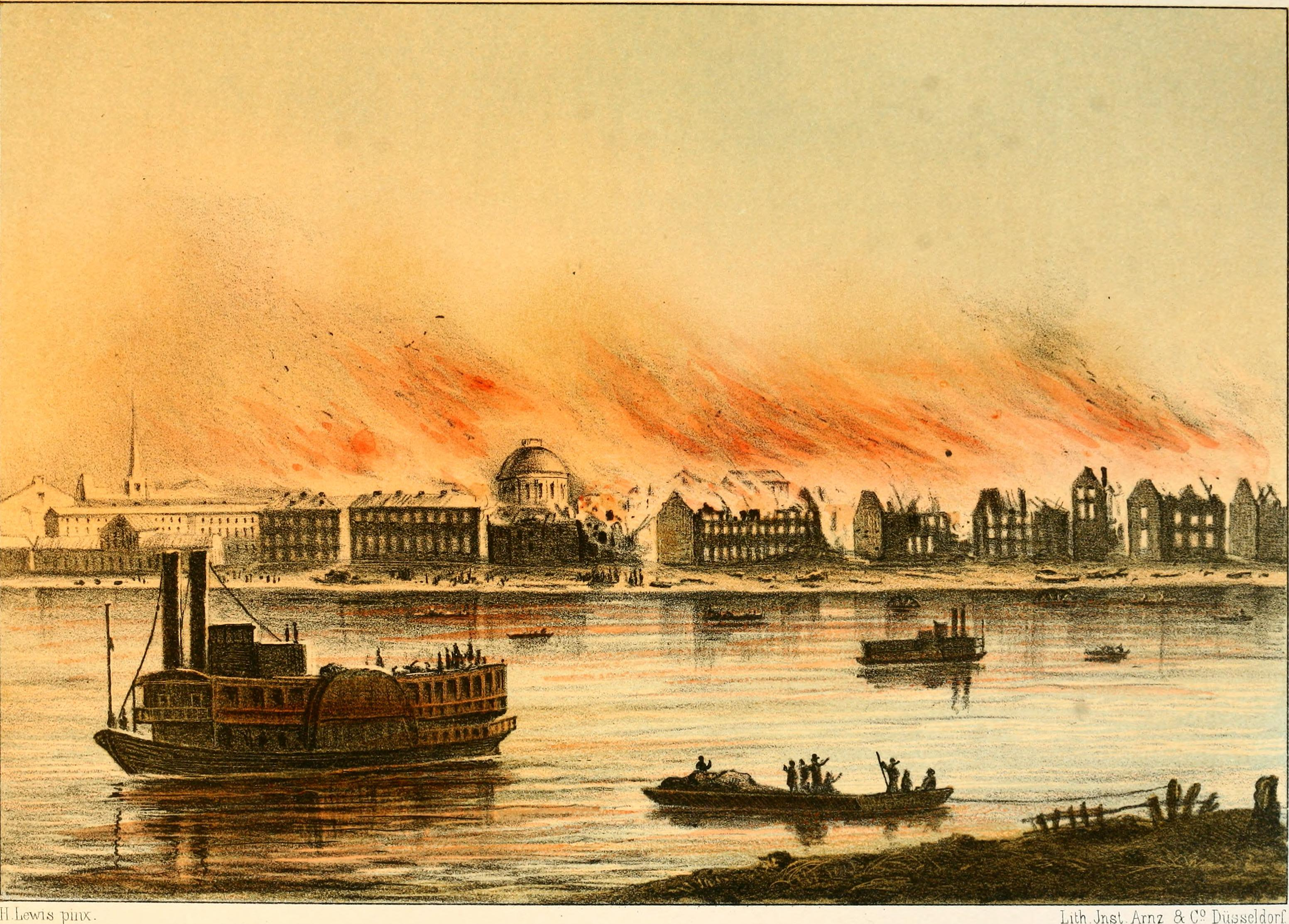
St. Louis Fire, illustrated by Henry Lewis in Das illustrirte Mississippithal (The Valley of the Mississippi Illustrated) from 1857

This fire was the largest and most destructive fire St. Louis has ever experienced. When the fire was finally contained after 11 hours, 430 buildings were destroyed, 23 steamboats along with over a dozen other boats were lost, and three people had died including a fire captain. As a result of these fires, a new building code required new structures to be built of stone or brick and an extensive new water and sewage system was started.

== The Great Fire as a Turning Point for St. Louis, Missouri ==
Historian Adam Arenson contends that, "St. Louis was not lost. The opportunities created by the Great Fire allowed the city to profit economically, politically, and culturally, for the West, and for the entire nation". Insurance payments allowed people opportunities to rebuild. One such example of the type of opulent brick homes built after the fire is the current historic landmark home of Robert G. Campbell which was built for J.H.Hall in 1851.

== See also ==
- St. Louis Fire Department
