= Duke of Buccleugh (1788 EIC ship) =

History

Great Britain
- Name: Duke of Buccleugh
- Namesake: Duke of Buccleuch
- Owner: EIC voyages 1–3: Donald Cameron; EIC voyages 4–6: William Moffatt
- Builder: Randall, Rotherhithe
- Launched: 27 October 1788
- Fate: Sold 1802

General characteristics
- Tons burthen: 1182, or 11822/94 (bm)
- Length: Overall: 161 ft 8 in (49.3 m); Keel: 130 ft 4 in (39.7 m)
- Beam: 41 ft 3 1/2 in (12.6 m)
- Depth of hold: 16 ft 6 in (5.0 m)
- Complement: 130
- Armament: 26 × 9-pounder guns

Duke of Buccleugh (or Duke of Buccleuch) was an East Indiaman launched in 1788. She made six voyages for the British East India Company (EIC) before she was sold in 1802.

== Career ==
1st EIC voyage (1789–1790): Captain Thomas Wall sailed from Portsmouth on 27 February 1789, bound for Madras and Bengal. On 18 March Duke of Buccleugh was at Bonavista. She reached Madras on 2 July and arrived at Whampoa Anchorage on 14 October. Homeward bound, she crossed the Second Bar on 24 January. reached St Helena on 28 April, and arrived back at Long Reach on 22 June.

2nd EIC voyage (1792–1793): Captain Wall sailed from the Downs on 15 February 1792, bound for Bombay and China. Duke of Buccleugh was at São Tiago on 18 March and Johanna on 15 June, and reached Bombay on 7 July. She arrived at Whampoa on 17 October. Homeward bound, she crossed the Second Bar on 21 January 1793. She reached St Helena on 22 April and Plymouth on 28 June, and arrived at Long Reach on 12 August.

3rd EIC voyage (1794–1795): War with France had started as Duke of Buccleugh was coming home from her second voyage. Captain Wall acquired a letter of marque on 6 December 1793, before he sailed from Portsmouth for Bombay and China on 20 March 1794. She was at São Tiago on 14 April, St Helena on 20 June, and Penang on 28 September. She arrived at Whampoa on 9 January 1795. Homeward bound, she crossed the Second Bar on 8 March, reached St Helena on 24 August and Portsmouth on 19 November, and arrived at Long Reach on 1 December.

4th EIC voyage (1796–1798): On 11 August 1796 Captain Wall sailed from Portsmouth, bound for China. Duke of Buccleugh was at St Helena on 17 October and Amboina on 8 January 1797. She arrived at Whampoa on 18 March. Homeward bound, she crossed the Second Bar on 30 April.

On 15 June 1797, Duke of Buccleuch sailed from Macao in company with 16 other merchantman, and under escort by HMS Swift. On 19 June the convoy encountered a hurricane that dispersed the convoy. Swift was last seen on 2 July. She was believed to have foundered soon after with the loss of all aboard.

On 24 August 1797 Duke of Buccleugh discovered a shoal that was named Buccleugh's Shoal for her. The shoal was about 12–13 miles from Waigeo island, which is on one side of Dampier Strait. She was at the Cape on 30 December, St Helena on 12 February 1798, and Cork on 25 June. She arrived at Long Reach on 11 July.

5th EIC voyage (1799–1800): Captain Wall sailed from Portsmouth on 18 June 1799, bound for China. Duke of Buccleugh reached Penang on 28 October and arrived at Whampoa on 16 January 1800. Homeward bound, she crossed the Second Bar on 10 March, reached St Helena on 15 July, and arrived on 28 September at Long Reach.

6th EIC voyage (1801–1802): Captain Wall sailed from Portsmouth on 19 May 1801. Duke of Buccleugh was at Rio de Janeiro on 1 August and Penang on 31 October. She arrived at Whampoa on 31 January 1802. Homeward bound, she crossed the Second Bar on 5 March, reached St Helena on 29 June, and arrived on 4 September at Long Reach.

== Fate ==
By one account, on her return Duke of Buccleugh was sold for use as a troopship, store-ship, and hulk. She did not appear in Lloyd's Register or the Register of Shipping in 1803 or 1804, or in Lloyd's List for the same period.
