= Punta Gallinas =

Coordinates: 12°27′28″N 71°39′56″W

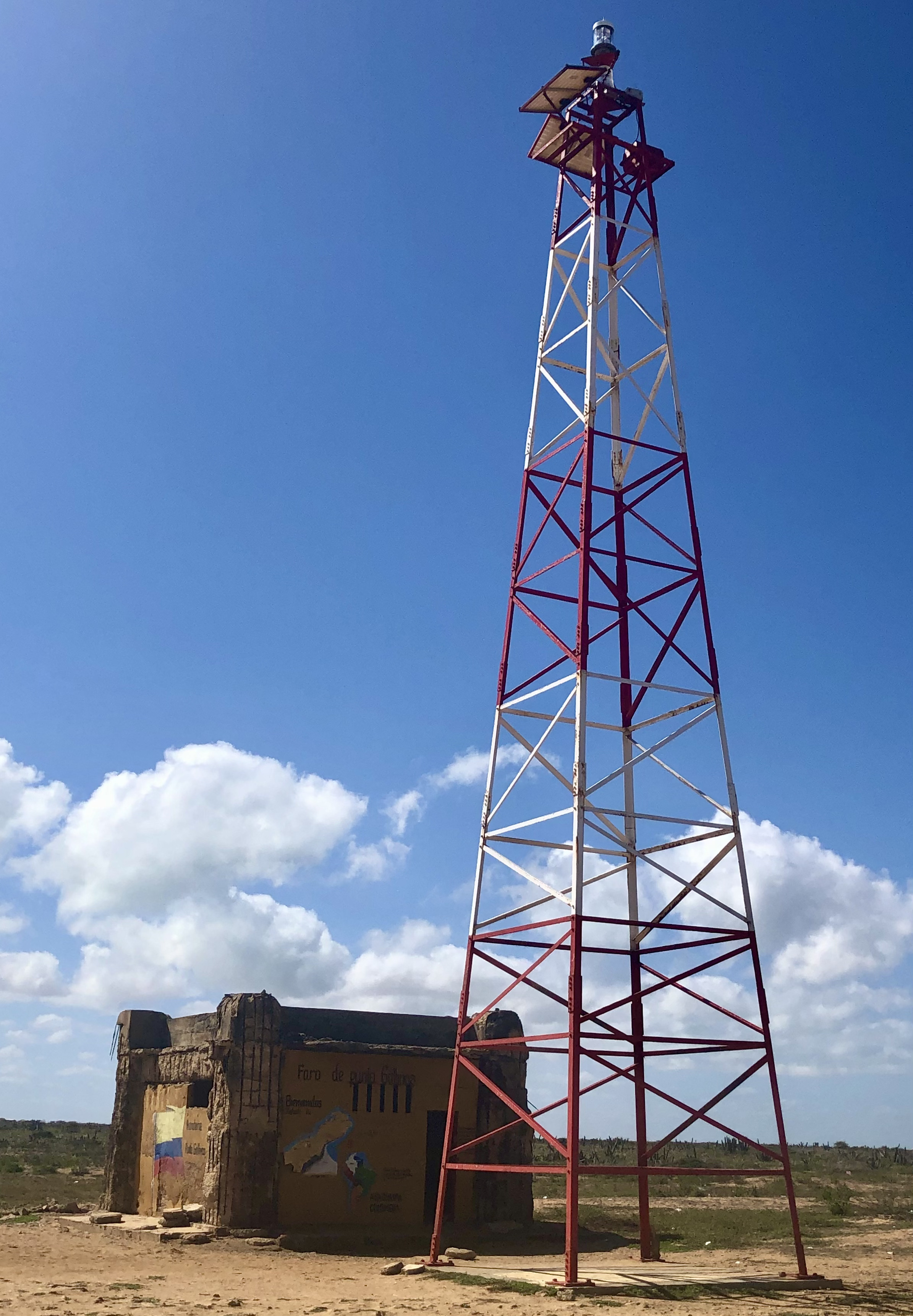
Punta Gallinas Lighthouse

Overview map

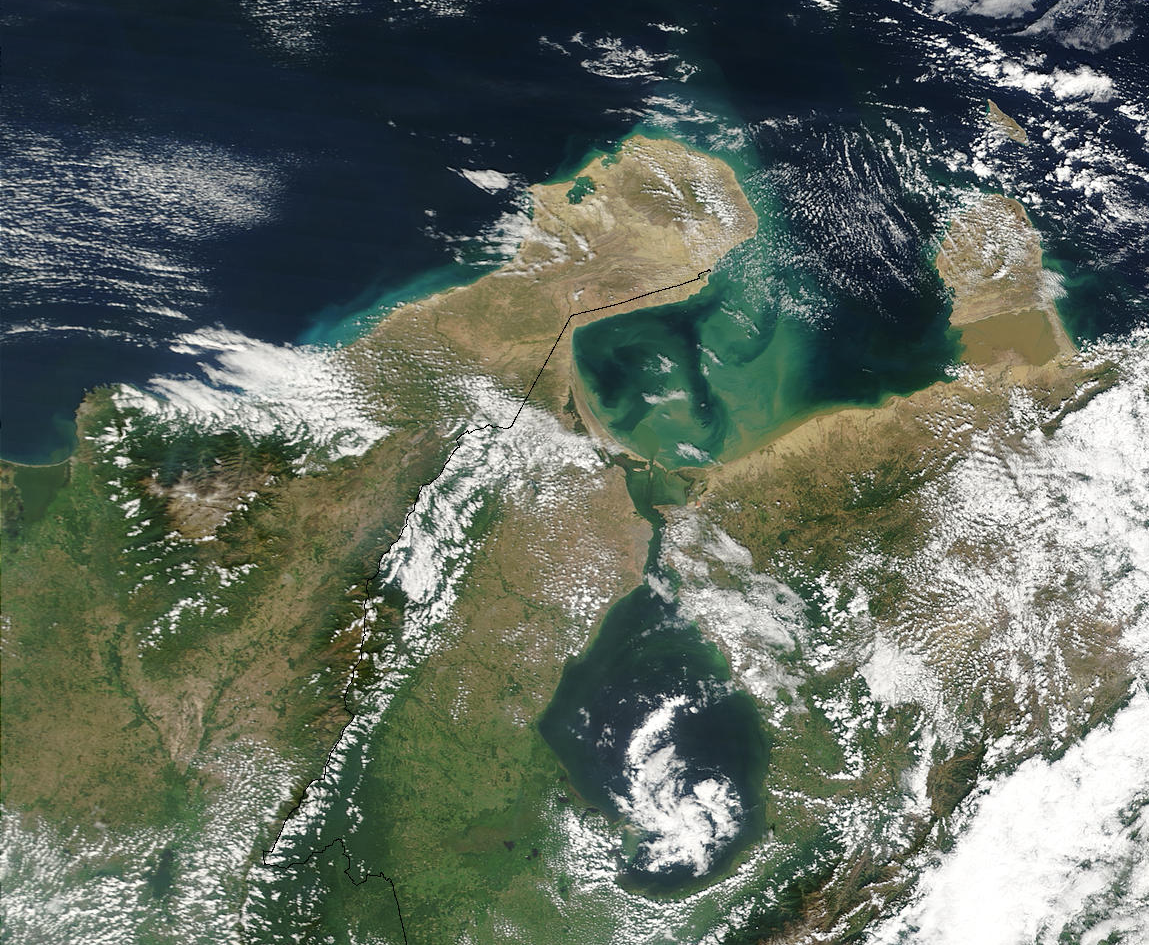
Punta Gallinas at top of satellite picture

Punta Gallinas (Cape Gallinas, "Cape Hens") is a headland in northern Colombia. Located in Uribia Municipality, La Guajira Department, it is the northernmost point on the mainland of South America, and one of the extreme points of South America.

== Geography ==
Punta Gallinas is situated in the northern part of the department of La Guajira, on the coast of the Caribbean Sea.

The cape is at the northern tip of the Guajira Peninsula (Península de la Guajira) in the municipality of Uribia, about 150 km (95 mi) northeast of Riohacha.

== History ==
The indigenous Wayuu people have populated the area for a long time.

The headland is also the location of the northernmost lighthouse in South America, the 18 m (59 ft) high Faro de Punta Gallinas, which opened in 1989.
