= Duchess of Buccleugh (1784 ship) =

Duchess of Buccleugh

History

Great Britain
- Name: Duchess of Buccleugh
- Namesake: Duchess of Buccleuch
- Builder: Leith
- Launched: 1784
- Fate: Wrecked 1788

General characteristics
- Tons burthen: 90, or 100 (bm)

Duchess of Buccleugh (or Dutchess of Buccleugh) was launched at Lieth in 1784. She ran ashore in 1788 near Yarmouth and was wrecked.

Dutchess of Buccleugh first appeared in Lloyd's Register (LR) in 1784 with Pottinger, master, J.Mason, owner, and trade Leith–Copenhagen.

Lloyd's List (LL) reported on 12 December 1788 that Dhs. of Buccleugh, Brown, master, had grounded on the Cockle Sand while sailing from Leith to London. It was hoped that she could be got off if the weather was good. A letter from Yarmouth dated 14 December reported that Dutchess of Buccleugh had gone to pieces.
