= Duchess of Buccleuch (1843 ship) =

History

United Kingdom
- Name: Duchess of Buccleuch
- Namesake: Duchess of Buccleuch
- Builder: James Edwards, South Shields
- Launched: 1843
- Fate: Wrecked 1850

General characteristics
- Tons burthen: Old Act:349 (bm); New Act (post 1836):404 (bm)

Duchess of Buccleuch was launched in 1843 at South Shields as an East Indiaman. She was wrecked in 1850.

== Career ==
Dutchess of Buccleugh first appeared in Lloyd's Register (LR) in 1843 with Straker, master, J.Edwards, owner, and trade Shields–Calcutta.

Year	Master	Owner	Trade	Source & notes
1845	Straker	J.Edwards	Shields–Calcutta; Liverpool	LR
1850	W.Bell	R.Hodgan	Newcastle–Calcutta	LR; large repair 1849

On 18 May 1849 Duchess of Buccleuch grounded on the Long Sand in the North Sea off the coast of Essex. Her crew were rescued. Two days later she was gotten off after some of her cargo had been unloaded and her mainmast cut away. A steamer towed her into Ramsgate. Duchess of Buccleuch had almost 10 feet of water in her hold. On 24 August she sailed from Shields for Calcutta.

On 19 February 1850 Duchess of Buccleuch ran aground and was damaged in the Hooghly River. She was on a voyage from Liverpool to Calcutta. She was refloated and taken in to Calcutta.

== Fate ==
Duchess of Buccleugh ran ashore on 7 June 1850 at Quion Point near Cape Agulhas after losing her rudder. Her crew were rescued. She was on a voyage from Calcutta to London. She was carrying a cargo of indigo, rice, pepper, and silk. On 26 July she was refloated and taken to Cape Town where she was condemned.
