= Illinois =

U.S. state

- State
- Flag Seal
- Nicknames: Land of Lincoln, Prairie State, The Inland Empire State
- Motto(s): State Sovereignty, National Union
- Anthem: "Illinois"
- Location of Illinois within the United States
- Country: United States
- Before statehood: Illinois Territory
- Admitted to the Union: December 3, 1818 (21st)
- Capital: Springfield
- Largest city: Chicago
- Largest county or equivalent: Cook
- Largest metro and urban areas: Chicagoland

Government
  - Governor: JB Pritzker (D)
  - Lieutenant Governor: Juliana Stratton (D)
- Legislature: General Assembly
  - Upper house: Illinois Senate
  - Lower house: Illinois House of Representatives
- Judiciary: Supreme Court of Illinois
- U.S. senators: Dick Durbin (D); Tammy Duckworth (D)
- U.S. House delegation: 14 Democrats; 3 Republicans; (list)

Area
  - Total: 57,914 sq mi (149,997 km^{2})
  - Land: 55,587 sq mi (143,969 km^{2})
  - Water: 2,309 sq mi (5,981 km^{2}) 3.99%
  - Rank: 25th

Dimensions
  - Length: 390 mi (628 km)
  - Width: 210 mi (338 km)
- Elevation: 590 ft (180 m)
- Highest elevation (Charles Mound (Note: Elevation adjusted to North American Vertical Datum of 1988)): 1,235 ft (376.4 m)
- Lowest elevation (Confluence of Mississippi River and Ohio River): 279 ft (85 m)

Population (2025)
  - Total: ▼12,719,141
  - Rank: 6th
  - Density: 232/sq mi (89.4/km^{2})
  - Rank: 12th
  - Median household income: ▲$80,300 (2023)
  - Income rank: 17th
- Demonyms: Illinoisan

Language
  - Official language: English
  - Spoken language: English (80.8%); Spanish (14.9%); Other (5.1%)
- Time zone: UTC−06:00 (CST)
  - Summer (DST): UTC−05:00 (CDT)
- USPS abbreviation: IL
- ISO 3166 code: US-IL
- Traditional abbreviation: Ill.
- Latitude: 36° 58′ N to 42° 30′ N
- Longitude: 87° 30′ W to 91° 31′ W
- Website: illinois.gov

State symbols of Illinois
List of state symbols
- Flag of Illinois

- Seal of Illinois
- Slogan: "Land of Lincoln"

Living insignia
- Amphibian: Eastern tiger salamander
- Bird: Northern cardinal
- Butterfly: Monarch butterfly
- Fish: Bluegill
- Flower: Violet
- Grass: Big bluestem
- Mammal: White-tailed deer
- Mushroom: Giant puffball
- Reptile: Painted turtle
- Tree: White oak

Inanimate insignia
- Dance: Square dance
- Food: Gold Rush Apple, popcorn
- Fossil: Tully monster
- Mineral: Fluorite
- Rock: Dolomite
- Soil: Drummer silty clay loam

State route marker

State quarter
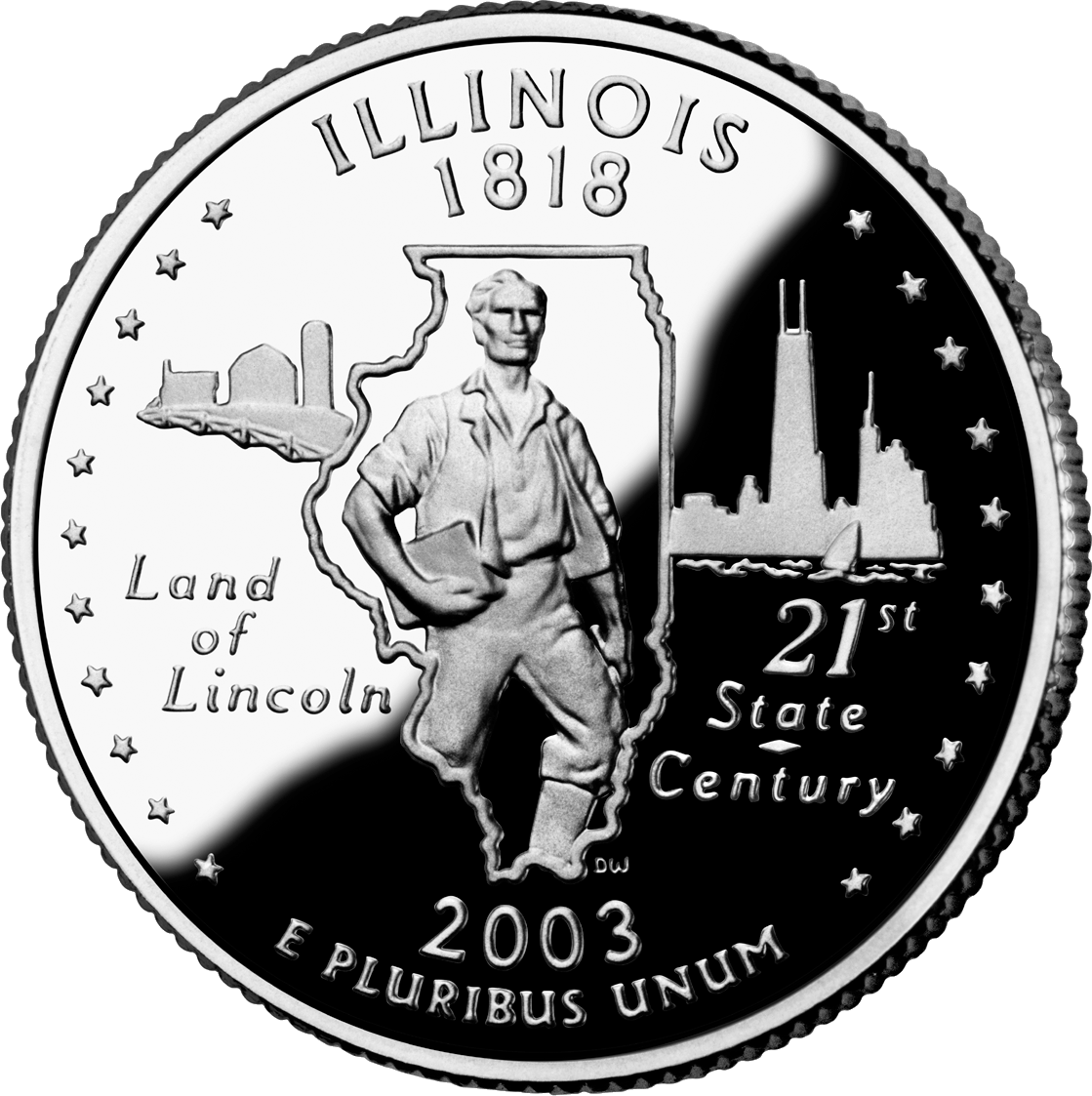
- Released in 2003

Illinois (/ˌɪlɪˈnɔɪ/ IL-ih-NOY) is a state in the Midwestern United States. It borders on Lake Michigan to its northeast, the Wabash and Ohio rivers to its south, and the Mississippi River generally to its west. (Note: Illinois borders the state of Wisconsin to its north, Iowa to its northwest, Missouri to its southwest, Kentucky to its south, Indiana to its east, and has a water border with Michigan to the northeast in Lake Michigan. The village of Kaskaskia in Randolph County, the original capital of Illinois, is where late-19th century flooding led to shifting of the Mississippi River, leaving the village and part of the county west of the Mississippi.) Of the fifty U.S. states, Illinois has the fifth-largest gross domestic product (GDP), the sixth-largest population, and the 25th-most land area. Its capital city is Springfield in the center of the state, and the state's largest city is Chicago, located in northeastern Illinois.

Present-day Illinois was inhabited by Indigenous cultures for thousands of years. The French were the first Europeans to arrive, settling near the Mississippi and Illinois rivers in the 17th-century Illinois Country, as part of their sprawling colony of New France. A century later, the revolutionary war Illinois campaign prefigured American involvement in the region. Following U.S. independence in 1783, which made the Mississippi River the national boundary, American settlers began arriving from Kentucky via the Ohio River. Illinois was soon part of the United States' oldest territory, the Northwest Territory, and in 1818, it achieved statehood. The Erie Canal brought increased commercial activity in the Great Lakes, and the invention of the self-scouring steel plow by Illinoisan John Deere turned the state's rich prairie into some of the world's most productive and valuable farmland, attracting immigrant farmers from Germany, Sweden, Hungary, and elsewhere.

In the mid-19th century, the Illinois and Michigan Canal and a sprawling railroad network facilitated trade, commerce, and settlement, making the state a transportation hub for the nation, especially in Chicago, which became the world's fastest growing city by the late 19th century. By 1900, the growth of industrial jobs in the northern cities and coal mining in the central and southern areas attracted immigrants from Eastern and Southern Europe. Illinois became one of America's most industrialized states and remains a major manufacturing center. The Great Migration from the South established a large black community, particularly in Chicago, which became a leading cultural, economic, and population center; the Chicago metropolitan area holds about 75% of the state's 12.8 million residents. Illinois, alongside Texas, is one of the most tornadically active states in the U.S; in 2023 alone, Illinois produced 136 tornadoes, the highest state by a significant margin.

Two World Heritage Sites are in Illinois: the ancient Cahokia Mounds, and part of the Wright architecture site. A wide variety of protected areas seek to conserve Illinois' natural and cultural resources. Major centers of learning include the University of Chicago, University of Illinois, and Northwestern University. Three U.S. presidents have been elected while residents of Illinois: Abraham Lincoln, Ulysses S. Grant, and Barack Obama; additionally, Ronald Reagan was born and raised in the state, though he served for California. Illinois honors Lincoln with its official state slogan Land of Lincoln. The state is the site of the Abraham Lincoln Presidential Library and Museum in Springfield and the home of the Barack Obama Presidential Center in Chicago.

The economy of Illinois is highly diversified, with Chicago serving as a global city for the U.S. Midwest, major industrial and agricultural hubs in the north and center, and natural resources such as coal, timber, and petroleum in the south. Owing to its central U.S. location, the state is a major transportation hub: the Port of Chicago has access to the Atlantic Ocean through the Great Lakes and Saint Lawrence Seaway and to the Gulf of Mexico from the Mississippi River via the Illinois Waterway. Chicago has been the nation's railroad hub since the 1860s, and its O'Hare International Airport has been among the world's busiest airports for decades. Illinois has long been considered a microcosm of the United States and a bellwether in American culture, exemplified by the phrase Will it play in Peoria?.

== Etymology ==
"Illinois" is the modern spelling for the early French Catholic missionaries and explorers' name for the Illinois Native Americans, a name that was spelled in many different ways in the early records.

American scholars previously thought the name Illinois meant 'man' or 'men' in the Miami-Illinois language, with the original iliniwek transformed via French into Illinois. This etymology is not supported by the Illinois language, as the word for "man" is ireniwa, and plural of "man" is ireniwaki. The name Illiniwek has also been said to mean 'tribe of superior men', which is a false etymology. The name Illinois derives from the Miami-Illinois verb irenwe·wa 'he speaks the regular way'. This was taken into the Ojibwe language, perhaps in the Ottawa dialect, and modified into ilinwe· (pluralized as ilinwe·k). The French borrowed these forms, spelling the /we/ ending as -ois, a transliteration of that sound in the French of that time. The current spelling form, Illinois, began to appear in the early 1670s, when French colonists had settled in the western area. The Illinois's name for themselves, as attested in all three of the French missionary-period dictionaries of Illinois, was Inoka, of unknown meaning and unrelated to the other terms.

== History ==
=== Pre-European ===
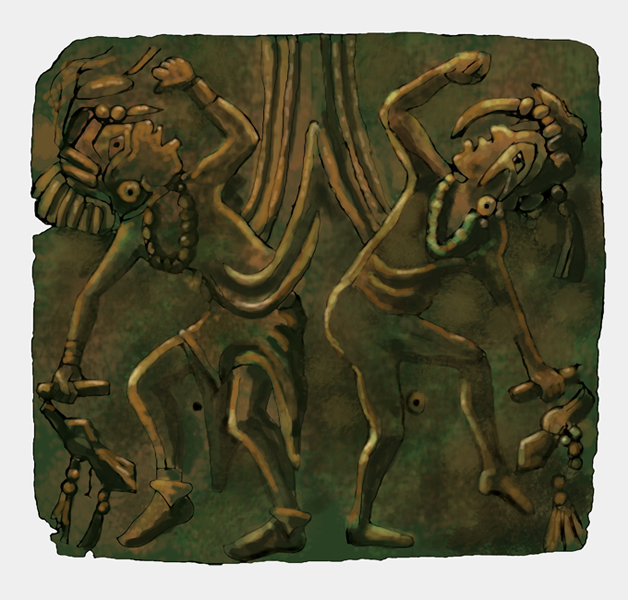
Mississippian copper plate found at the Saddle Site in Union County, Illinois

American Indians of successive cultures lived along the waterways of what is now Illinois for thousands of years before the arrival of Europeans. The Koster Site has been excavated and demonstrates 7,000 years of continuous habitation. Cahokia, the largest regional chiefdom and urban center of the pre-Columbian Mississippian culture, was located near present-day Collinsville, Illinois. They built an urban complex of more than 100 platform and burial mounds, a 50-acre (20 ha) plaza larger than 35 football fields, and a woodhenge of sacred cedar, all in a planned design expressing the culture's cosmology. Monks Mound, the center of the site, is the largest Pre-Columbian structure north of the Valley of Mexico. It is 100 ft (30 m) high, 951 ft (290 m) long, 836 ft (255 m) wide, and covers 13.8 acres (5.6 ha). It contains about 814,000 cu yd (622,000 m^{3}) of earth. It was topped by a structure thought to have measured about 105 ft (32 m) in length and 48 ft (15 m) in width, covered an area 5,000 sq ft (460 m^{2}), and been as much as 50 ft (15 m) high, making its peak 150 ft (46 m) above the level of the plaza. Archaeological recoveries from Cahokia—including elaborate ceramics, sculpted stonework, engraved copper and mica sheets, and a 20,000-shell-bead burial blanket—demonstrate that the site was an advanced urban center supporting residential clusters, markets, and diverse craft specialization.

The civilization collapsed in the 15th century due to undetermined causes, although theories suggest resource depletion and chronic intertribal warfare. Historian Suzanne Austin Alchon highlights that violent trauma accounted for one-third of adult deaths at a central Illinois River valley site. The next major power in the region was the Illinois Confederation or Illini, a political alliance. Around the time of European contact in 1673, the Illinois confederation had an estimated population of over 10,000 people. As the Illini declined during the Beaver Wars era, members of the Algonquian-speaking Potawatomi, Miami, Sauk, and other tribes including the Meskwaki, Iowa, Kickapoo, Mascouten, Piankeshaw, Shawnee, Wea, and Ho-Chunk came into the area from the east and north around the Great Lakes.

=== European exploration and settlement prior to 1800 ===
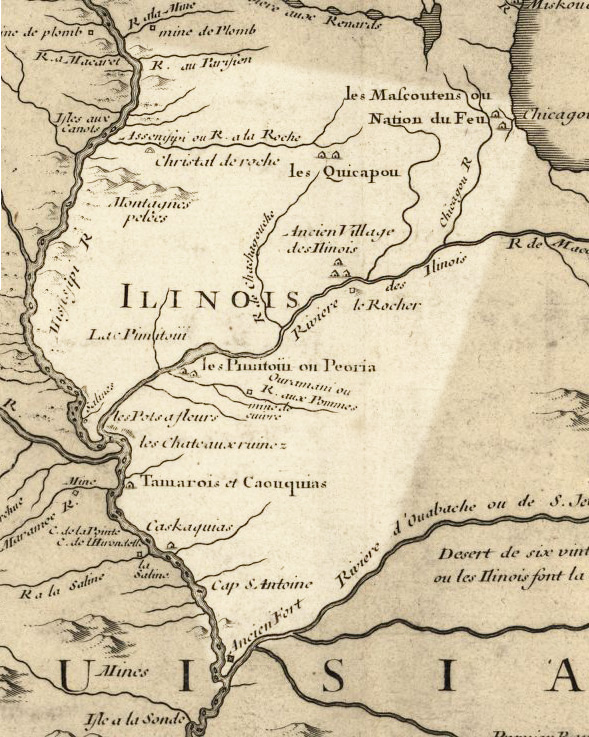
Illinois in 1718, approximate modern state area highlighted, from Carte de la Louisiane et du cours du Mississipi by Guillaume de L'Isle

French explorers Jacques Marquette and Louis Jolliet explored the Illinois River in 1673. Marquette soon after founded a mission at the Grand Village of the Illinois in Illinois Country. In 1680, French explorers under René-Robert Cavelier, Sieur de La Salle and Henri de Tonti constructed a fort at the site of present-day Peoria, and in 1682, a fort atop Starved Rock in today's Starved Rock State Park. French Empire Canadiens came south to settle particularly along the Mississippi River, and Illinois was part of first New France, and then of La Louisiane until 1763, when it passed to the British with their defeat of France in the Seven Years' War. The small French settlements continued, although many French migrated west to Ste. Genevieve and St. Louis, Missouri, to evade British rule.

British forces garrisoned a few isolated posts in Illinois; however, the region saw virtually no British or American colonization. This lack of settlement was a direct consequence of imperial decrees, which first designated the territory as indigenous lands west of the Appalachians and subsequently absorbed it into the Province of Quebec. In 1778, George Rogers Clark claimed Illinois County for Virginia. In a compromise, Virginia (and other states that made various claims) ceded the area to the new United States in the 1780s and it became part of the Northwest Territory, administered by the federal government and later organized as states.

=== 19th century ===
==== Prior to statehood ====
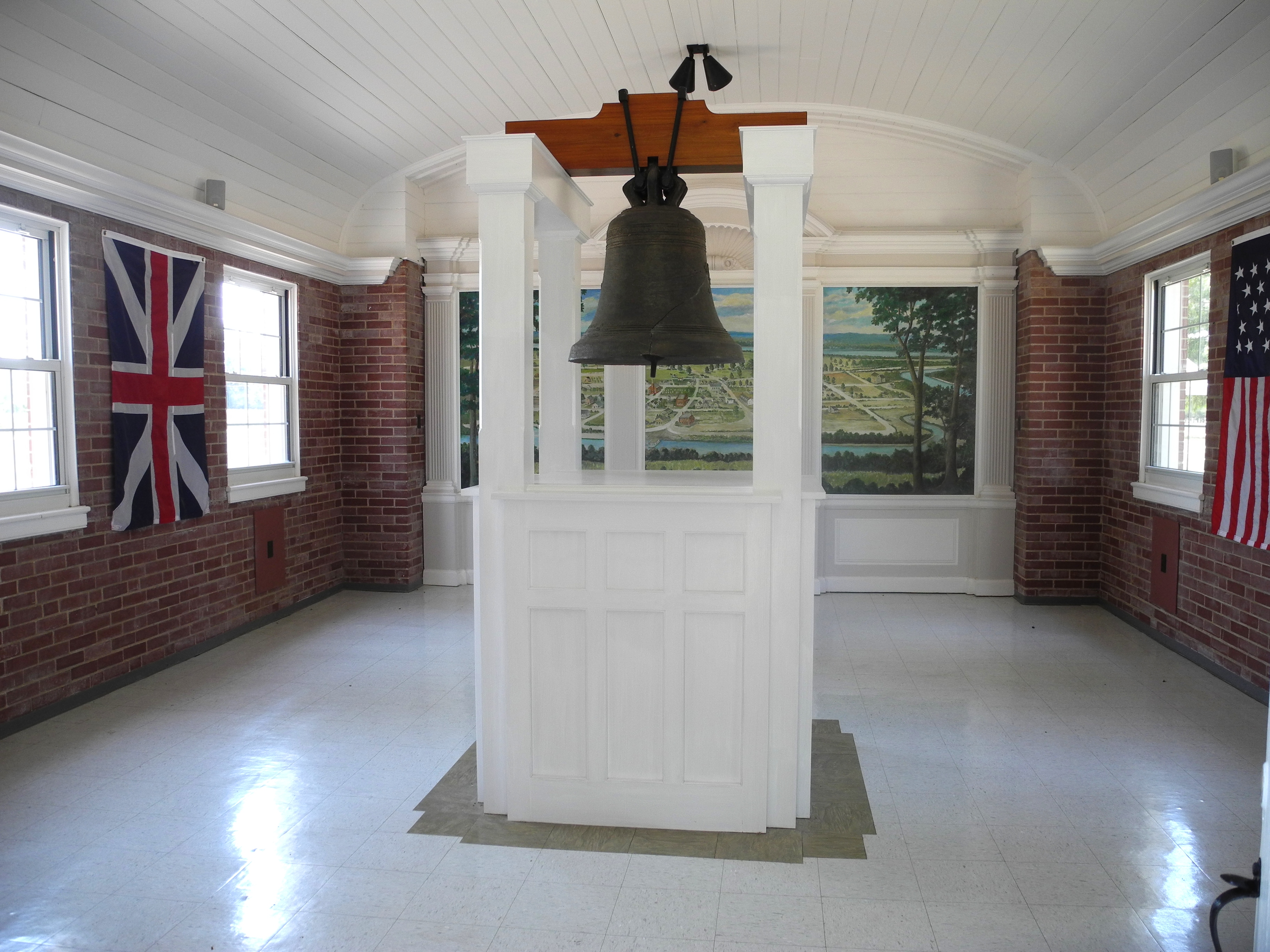
The bell donated by King Louis XV in 1741 to the French mission at Kaskaskia. It was later called the "Liberty Bell of the West", after it was rung to celebrate U.S. victory in the Revolution

The Illinois-Wabash Company was an early claimant to much of Illinois. The Illinois Territory was created on February 3, 1809, with its capital at Kaskaskia, an early French settlement.

During the discussions leading up to Illinois's admission to the Union, the proposed northern boundary of the state was moved twice. The original provisions of the Northwest Ordinance had specified a boundary that would have been tangent to the southern tip of Lake Michigan. Such a boundary would have left Illinois with no shoreline on Lake Michigan at all. However, as Indiana had successfully been granted a 10 mi (16 km) northern extension of its boundary to provide it with a usable lakefront, the original bill for Illinois statehood, submitted to Congress on January 23, 1818, stipulated a northern border at the same latitude as Indiana's, which is defined as 10 miles north of the southernmost extremity of Lake Michigan. However, the Illinois delegate, Nathaniel Pope, wanted more, and lobbied to have the boundary moved further north. The final bill passed by Congress included an amendment to shift the border to 42° 30' north, which is approximately 51 mi (82 km) north of the Indiana northern border. This shift added 8,500 sq mi (22,000 km^{2}) to the state, including the lead mining region near Galena. More importantly, it added nearly 50 miles of Lake Michigan shoreline and the Chicago River. Pope and others envisioned a canal that would connect the Chicago and Illinois rivers and thus connect the Great Lakes to the Mississippi.

==== State of Illinois prior to the Civil War ====
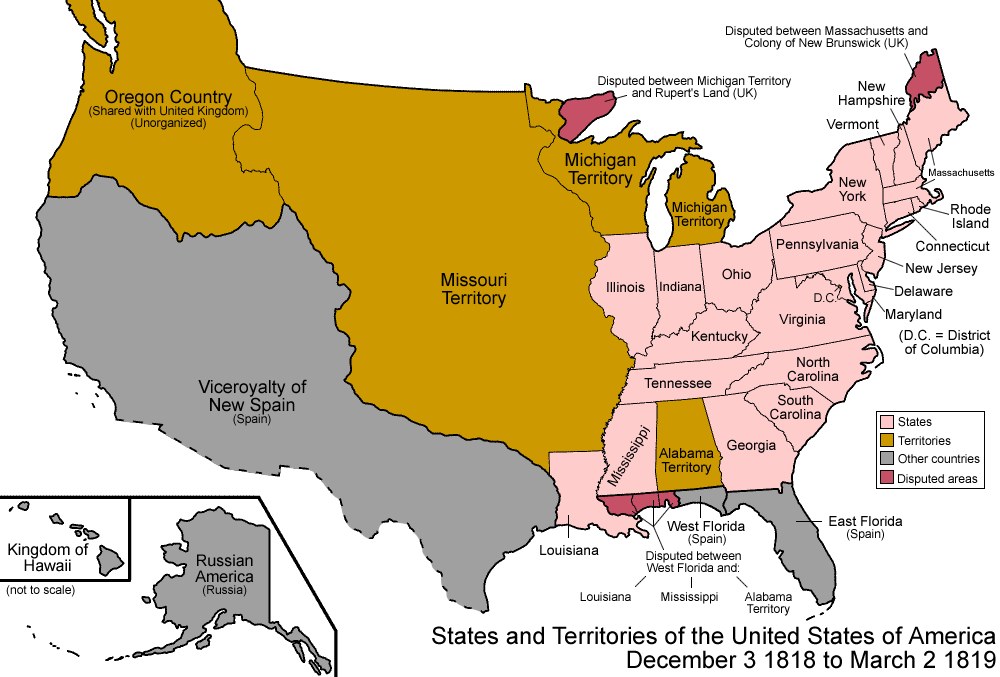
In 1818, Illinois became the 21st U.S. state. The southern portion of Illinois Territory was admitted as the state of Illinois, and the rest was joined to Michigan Territory.

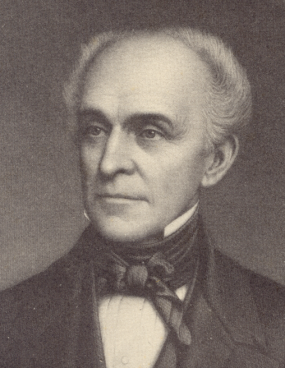
The second Governor of Illinois, Edward Coles brought his slaves from his home state of Virginia to give them their freedom when they arrived in Illinois.

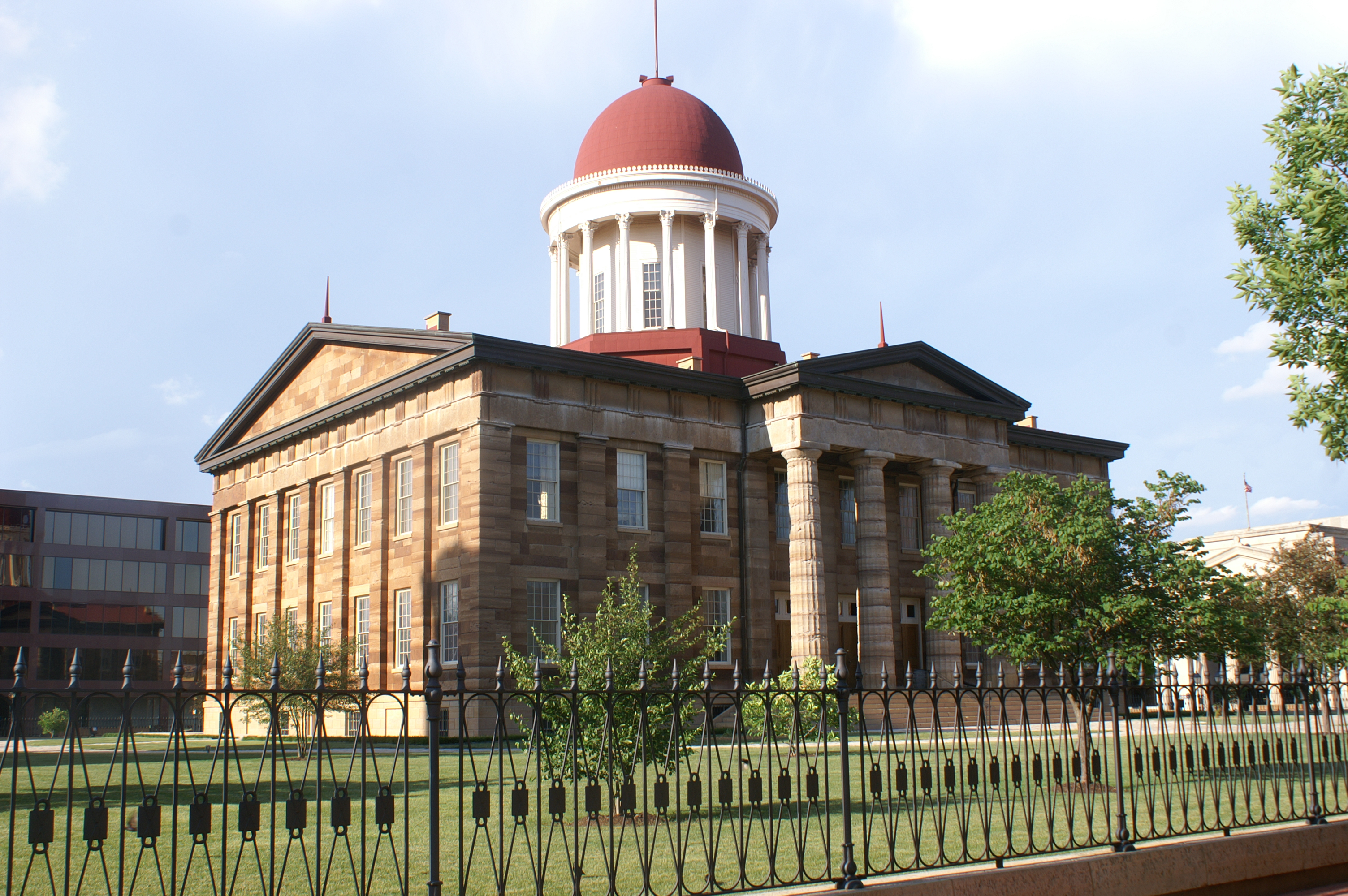
Old State Capitol: Abraham Lincoln and other area legislators were instrumental in moving the state capitol to centrally located Springfield in 1839.

In 1818, Illinois became the 21st U.S. state. The capital remained at Kaskaskia, headquartered in a small building rented by the state. In 1819, Vandalia became the capital, and over the next 18 years, three separate buildings were built to serve successively as the capitol building. In 1837, the state legislators representing Sangamon County, under the leadership of state representative Abraham Lincoln, succeeded in having the capital moved to Springfield, where a fifth capitol building was constructed. A sixth capitol building was erected in 1867, which continues to serve as the Illinois capitol today.

Though it was ostensibly a "free state", there was nonetheless slavery in Illinois. French colonists introduced enslavement to the Illinois region in the 1720s, a practice expanded by American settlers migrating from Kentucky. Although the Northwest Ordinance of 1787 nominally banned slavery, the prohibition was not enforced against pre-existing slaveholders. Consequently, when Illinois achieved statehood in 1818 and transitioned out of the Ordinance's jurisdiction, approximately 900 people remained enslaved within the state. As the southern part of the state, later known as "Egypt" or "Little Egypt", was largely settled by migrants from the South, the section was hostile to free blacks. Edward Coles, the second Governor of Illinois who was born in Virginia, participated in a campaign to block extending existing slavery in Illinois after winning the 1822 Illinois gubernatorial election. In 1824, state residents voted against making slavery legal by a vote of 6640 against to 4972 for.

Still, most residents opposed allowing free blacks as permanent residents. Some settlers brought in slaves seasonally or as house servants. The Illinois Constitution of 1848 was written with a provision for exclusionary laws to be passed. In 1853, John A. Logan helped pass a law to prohibit all African Americans, including freedmen, from settling in the state.

The winter of 1830–1831 is called the "Winter of the Deep Snow"; a sudden, deep snowfall blanketed the state, making travel impossible for the rest of the winter, and many travelers perished. Several severe winters followed, including the "Winter of the Sudden Freeze". On December 20, 1836, a fast-moving cold front passed through, freezing puddles in minutes and killing many travelers who could not reach shelter. The adverse weather resulted in crop failures in the northern part of the state. The southern part of the state shipped food north, and this may have contributed to its name, "Little Egypt", after the Biblical story of Joseph in Egypt supplying grain to his brothers.

In 1832, the Black Hawk War was fought in Illinois and present-day Wisconsin between the United States and a coalition of the Sauk, Meskwaki, and Kickapoo peoples, who had been forced to leave their homes and relocate to Iowa in 1831. The tribes had lost their territory east of the Mississippi river in Illinois under a disputed treaty in 1804. The natives, under Sauk chief Black Hawk, attempted to return to Illinois in April 1832 to reclaim this land. They were attacked and defeated by the U.S. Militia and rival tribes allied with the US forces, including the Potawatomi, Dakota, Menominee, and Ho-Chunk. The survivors of Black Hawk's band were forced back to Iowa. This represented the end of native resistance to white settlement in the Chicago and Northern Illinois regions. By 1832, when the last native lands in Illinois were ceded to the United States, the indigenous population of the state had been reduced by infectious diseases, warfare, and forced westward removal to only one village with fewer than 300 inhabitants.

By 1839, the Latter Day Saints had founded a utopian city called Nauvoo, formerly called Commerce. Located in Hancock County along the Mississippi River, Nauvoo flourished and, by 1844, briefly surpassed Chicago for the position of the state's largest city. But in that same year, the Latter Day Saint movement founder, Joseph Smith, was killed in the Carthage Jail, about 30 miles away from Nauvoo. Following a succession crisis, Brigham Young led most Latter Day Saints out of Illinois in a mass exodus to present-day Utah; after close to six years of rapid development, Nauvoo quickly declined afterward.

After it was established in 1833, Chicago gained prominence as a Great Lakes port, and then as an Illinois and Michigan Canal port after 1848, and as a rail hub soon afterward. By 1857, Chicago was Illinois's largest city. With the tremendous growth of mines and factories in the state in the 19th century, Illinois was the ground for the formation of labor unions in the United States.

In 1847, after lobbying by Dorothea L. Dix, Illinois became one of the first states to establish a system of state-supported treatment of mental illness and disabilities, replacing local almshouses. Dix came into this effort after having met J. O. King, a Jacksonville, Illinois businessman, who invited her to Illinois, where he had been working to build an asylum for the insane. With the lobbying expertise of Dix, plans for the Jacksonville State Hospital (now known as the Jacksonville Developmental Center) were signed into law on March 1, 1847.

==== Civil War and after ====
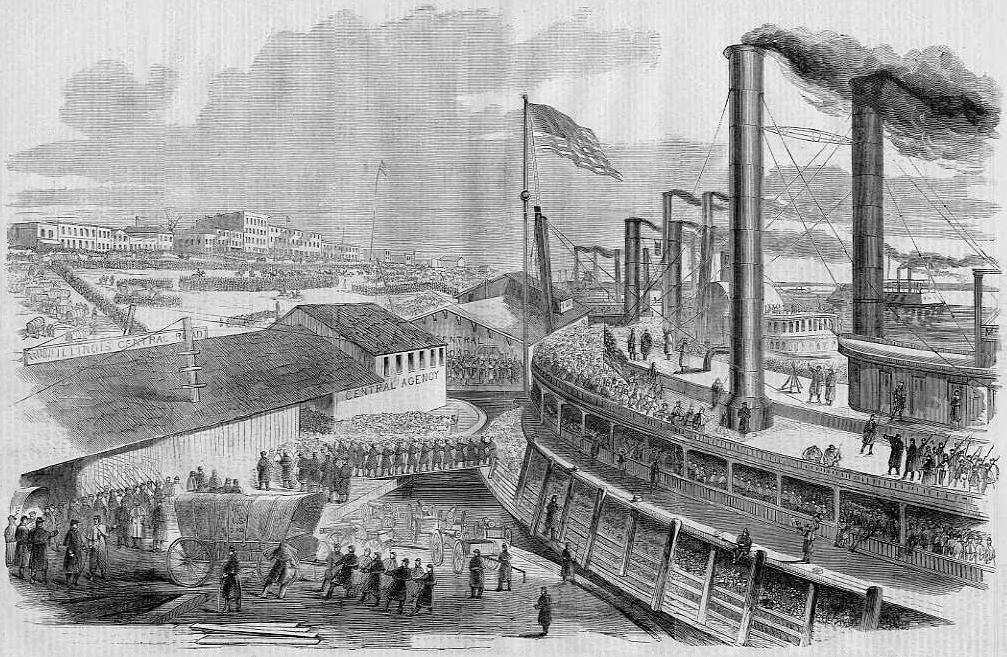
Union troops embarking at Cairo on January 10, 1862

During the American Civil War, Illinois ranked fourth in soldiers who served (more than 250,000) in the Union Army, a figure surpassed by only New York, Pennsylvania, and Ohio. Beginning with President Abraham Lincoln's first call for troops and continuing throughout the war, Illinois mustered 150 infantry regiments, which were numbered from the 7th to the 156th regiments. Seventeen cavalry regiments were also gathered, as well as two light artillery regiments. The town of Cairo, at the southern tip of the state at the confluence of the Mississippi and Ohio Rivers, served as a strategically important supply base and training center for the Union army. For several months, both General Grant and Admiral Foote had headquarters in Cairo.

During the Civil War, and more so afterwards, Chicago's population skyrocketed, which increased its prominence. The Pullman Strike and Haymarket Riot, in particular, greatly influenced the development of the American labor movement. From Sunday, October 8, 1871, until Tuesday, October 10, 1871, the Great Chicago Fire burned in downtown Chicago, killing 300 people and destroying four sq mi (10 km^{2}).

=== 20th century ===
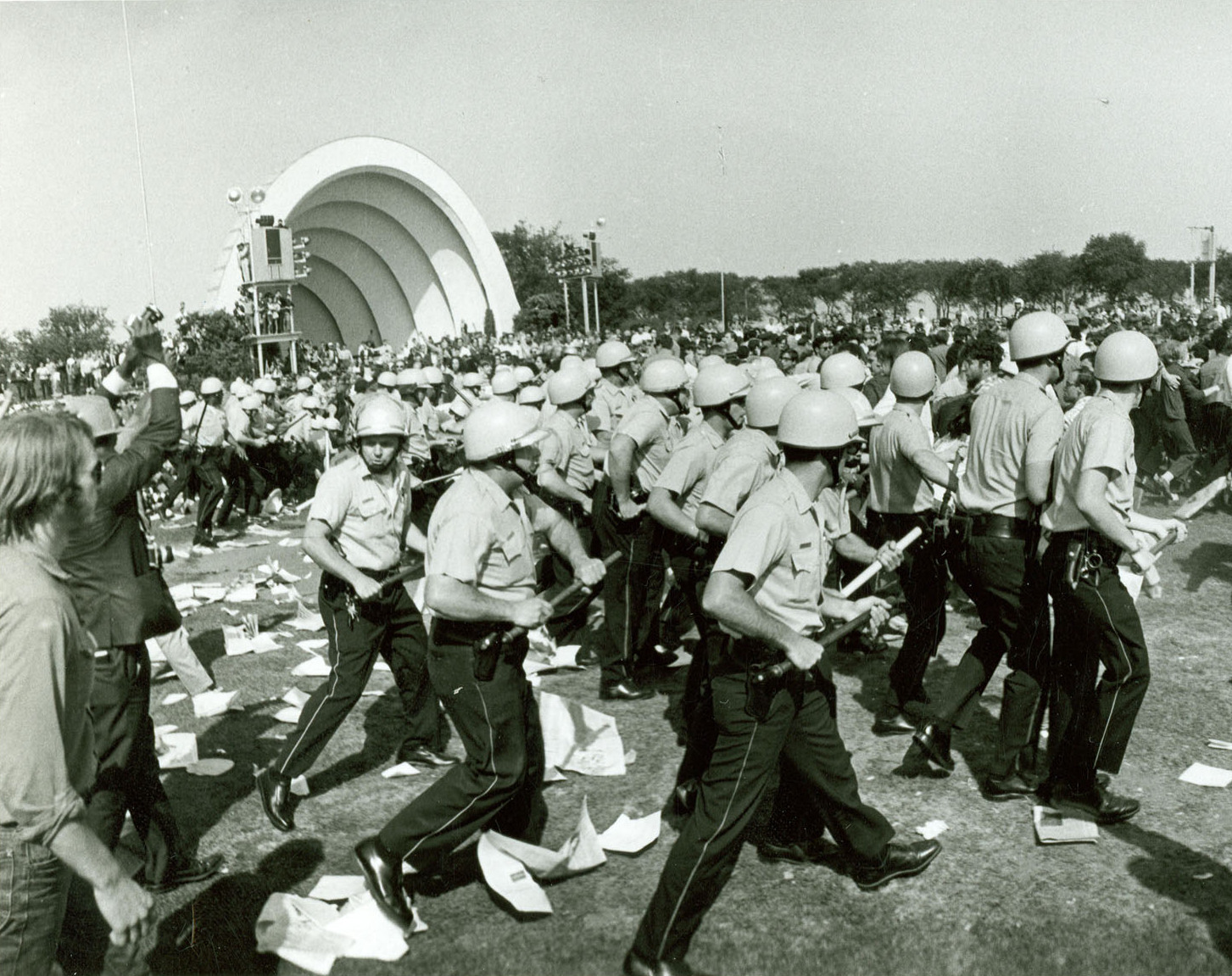
Police and protesters at the 1968 Democratic National Convention in Chicago.

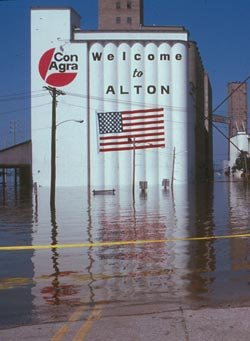
Rising waters in Alton in 1993.

At the turn of the 20th century, Illinois had a population of nearly 5 million. Many people from other parts of the country were attracted to the state by employment caused by the expanding industrial base. Whites were 98% of the state's population. Bolstered by continued immigration from southern and eastern Europe, and by the African-American Great Migration from the South, Illinois grew and emerged as one of the most important states in the union. By the end of the century, the population had reached 12.4 million.

The Century of Progress World's fair was held at Chicago in 1933. Oil strikes in Marion County and Crawford County led to a boom in 1937, and by 1939, Illinois ranked fourth in U.S. oil production. Illinois manufactured 6.1 percent of total United States military armaments produced during World War II, ranking seventh among the 48 states. Chicago became an ocean port with the opening of the Saint Lawrence Seaway in 1959. The seaway and the Illinois Waterway connected Chicago to both the Mississippi River and the Atlantic Ocean. In 1960, Ray Kroc opened the first McDonald's franchise in Des Plaines, which was demolished in 1984. In 1985 a replica was built on the same site to recreate how the original one looked. Though this replica was demolished in 2017, due to repeated flooding of the building.

Illinois had a prominent role in the emergence of the nuclear age. In 1942, as part of the Manhattan Project, the University of Chicago conducted the first sustained nuclear chain reaction. In 1957, Argonne National Laboratory, near Chicago, activated the first experimental nuclear power generating system in the United States. By 1960, the first privately financed nuclear plant in the United States, Dresden 1, was dedicated near Morris. In 1967, Fermilab, a national nuclear research facility near Batavia, opened a particle accelerator, which was the world's largest for over 40 years. With eleven plants currently operating, Illinois leads all states in the amount of electricity generated from nuclear power.

In 1961, Illinois became the first state in the nation to adopt the recommendation of the American Law Institute and pass a comprehensive criminal code revision that repealed the law against sodomy. The code also abrogated common law crimes and established an age of consent of 18. The state's fourth constitution was adopted in 1970, replacing the 1870 document.

The first Farm Aid concert was held in Champaign to benefit American farmers, in 1985. The worst upper Mississippi River flood of the century, the Great Flood of 1993, inundated many towns and thousands of acres of farmland.

=== 21st century ===
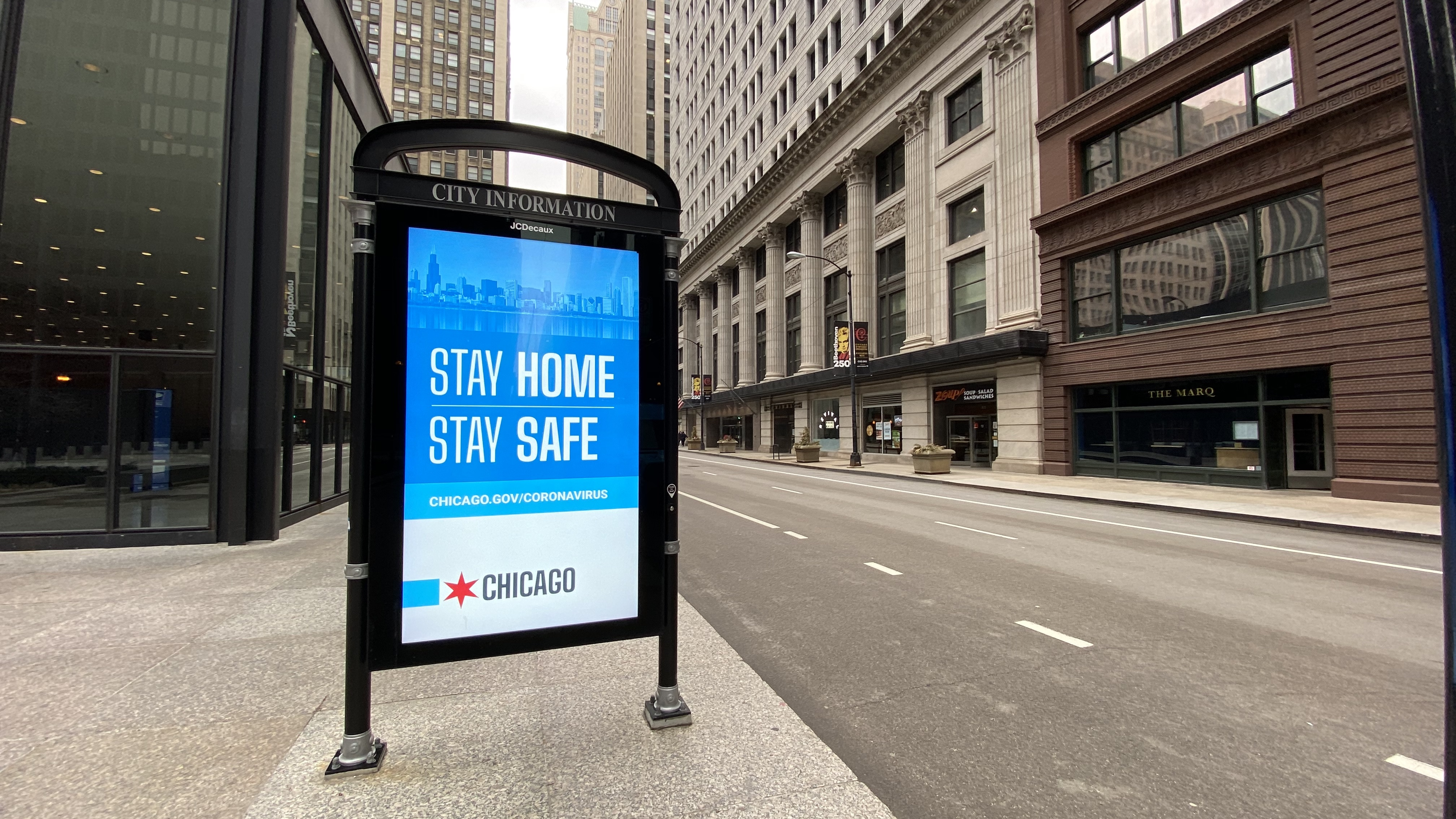
A COVID-19 safety message in the Chicago Loop

Illinois entered the 21st century under Republican Governor George Ryan. Near the end of his term in January 2003, following a string of high-profile exonerations, Ryan commuted all death sentences in the state.

The 2002 election brought Democrat Rod Blagojevich to the governor's mansion. It also brought future president Barack Obama into a committee leadership position in the Illinois Senate, where he drafted the Health Care Justice Act, a forerunner of the Affordable Care Act. Obama's election to the presidency in Blagojevich's second term set off a chain of events culminating in Blagojevich's impeachment, trial, and subsequent criminal conviction and imprisonment, making Blagojevich the second consecutive Illinois governor to be convicted on federal corruption charges.

Blagojevich's replacement Pat Quinn was defeated by Republican Bruce Rauner in the 2014 election. Disagreements between the governor and legislature over budgetary policy led to the Illinois Budget Impasse, a 793-day period stretching from 2015 to 2018 in which the state had no budget and struggled to pay its bills.

On August 28, 2017, Rauner signed a bill into law that prohibited state and local police from arresting anyone solely due to their immigration status or due to federal detainers. Some fellow Republicans criticized Rauner for his action, claiming the bill made Illinois a sanctuary state.

In the 2018 election, Rauner was replaced by J. B. Pritzker, returning the state government to a Democratic trifecta. In January 2020, the state legalized marijuana. On March 9, 2020, Pritzker issued a disaster proclamation due to the COVID-19 pandemic. He ended the state of emergency in May 2023.

== Geography ==
Illinois municipalities

Illinois is located in the Midwest region of the United States and is one of the eight states in the Great Lakes region of North America. Illinois's eastern border with Indiana consists of a north–south line at 87° 31′ 30″ west longitude in Lake Michigan at the north, to the Wabash River in the south above Post Vincennes. The Wabash River continues as the eastern/southeastern border with Indiana until the Wabash enters the Ohio River. This marks the beginning of Illinois's southern border with Kentucky, which runs along the northern shoreline of the Ohio River. Most of the western border with Missouri and Iowa is the Mississippi River; Kaskaskia is an exclave of Illinois, lying west of the Mississippi and reachable only from Missouri. The state's northern border with Wisconsin is fixed at 42° 30′ north latitude. The northeastern border of Illinois lies in Lake Michigan, within which Illinois shares a water boundary with the state of Michigan, as well as Wisconsin and Indiana.

=== Topography ===
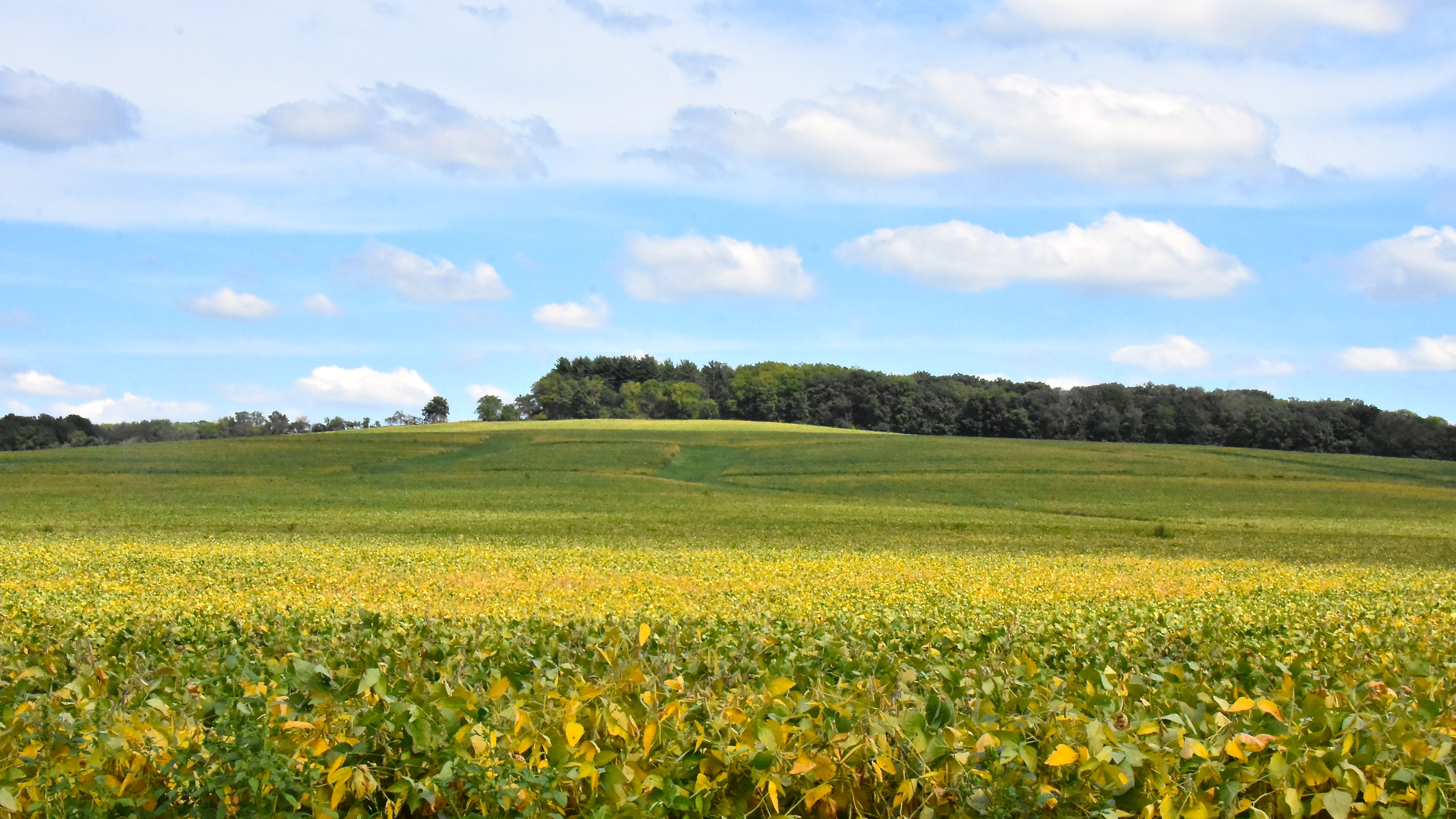
Charles Mound, the highest natural point in Illinois at 1,235 feet (376 m) above sea level, is located in the Driftless Area in the northwestern part of the state.

Though Illinois lies entirely in the Interior Plains, it does have some minor variation in its elevation. In extreme northwestern Illinois, the Driftless Area, a region of unglaciated and therefore higher and more rugged topography, occupies a small part of the state. Southern Illinois includes the hilly areas around the Shawnee National Forest.

Charles Mound, located in the Driftless region, has the state's highest natural elevation above sea level at 1,235 ft (376 m). Other highlands include the Shawnee Hills in the south, and there is varying topography along its rivers; the Illinois River bisects the state northeast to southwest. The floodplain on the Mississippi River from Alton to the Kaskaskia River is known as the American Bottom.

=== Geology ===
During the early part of the Paleozoic Era, the area that would one day become Illinois was submerged beneath a shallow sea and located near the Equator. Diverse marine life lived at this time, including trilobites, brachiopods, and crinoids. Changing environmental conditions led to the formation of large coal swamps in the Carboniferous.

Illinois was above sea level for at least part of the Mesozoic, but by its end was again submerged by the Western Interior Seaway. This receded by the Eocene Epoch.

During the Pleistocene Epoch, vast ice sheets covered much of Illinois, with only the Driftless Area remaining exposed. These glaciers carved the basin of Lake Michigan and left behind traces of ancient glacial lakes and moraines.

=== Divisions ===
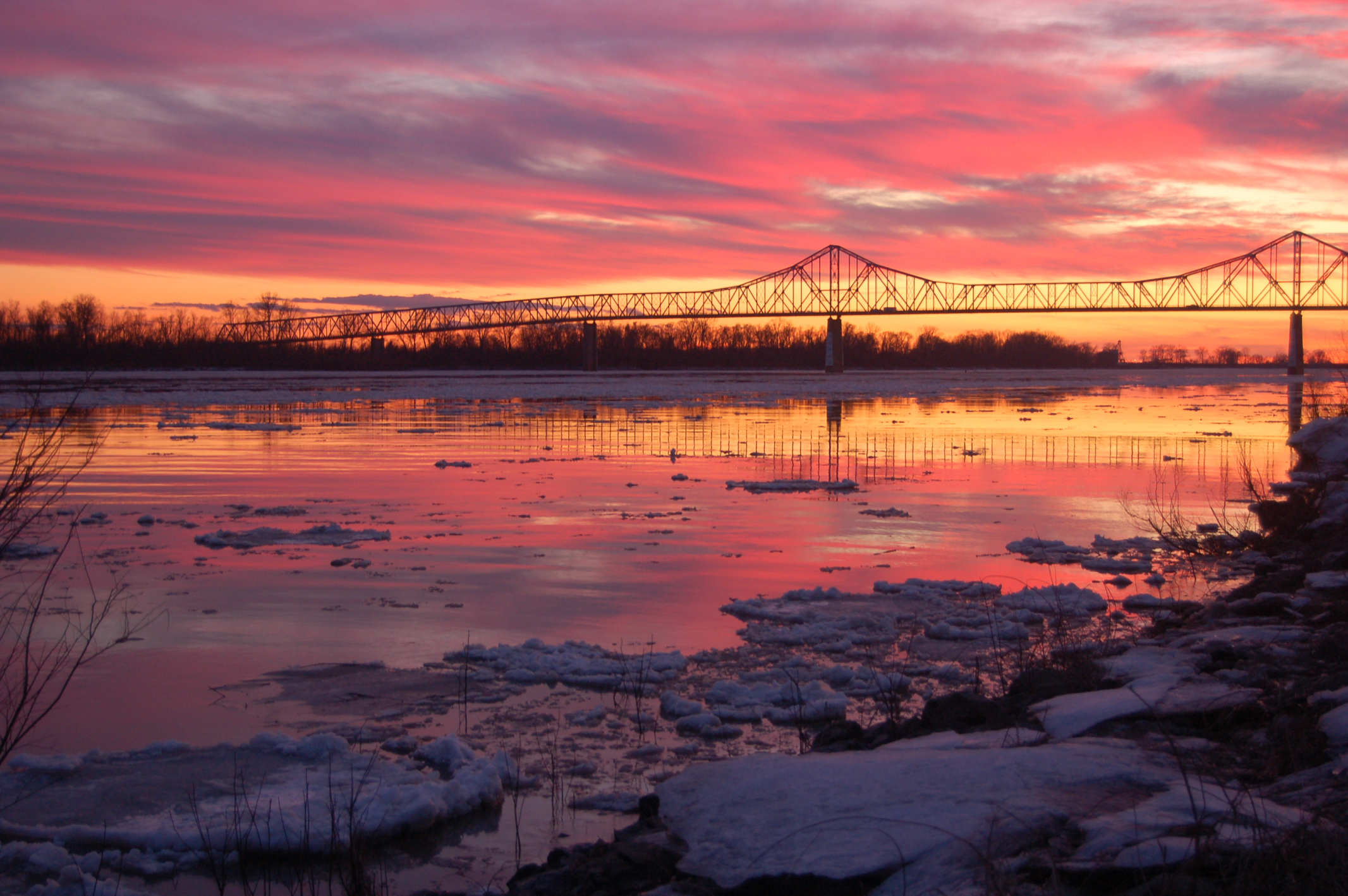
At 279 feet (85 m) above sea level, the lowest elevation point in the state is located near Cairo and the confluence of the Ohio and Mississippi Rivers.

Illinois has three major geographical divisions. Northern Illinois is dominated by the Chicago metropolitan area, or Chicagoland, which is the city of Chicago and its suburbs, and the adjoining exurban area into which the metropolis is expanding. As defined by the federal government, the Chicago metro area includes several counties in Illinois, Indiana, and Wisconsin, and has a population of over 9.8 million. Chicago itself is a cosmopolitan city, densely populated, industrialized, the transportation hub of the nation, and settled by a wide variety of ethnic groups. The city of Rockford, Illinois's third-largest city and center of the state's fourth largest metropolitan area, sits along Interstates 39 and 90 some 75 mi (121 km) northwest of Chicago. The Quad Cities region, located along the Mississippi River in northern Illinois, had a population of 381,342 in 2011.

The midsection of Illinois is the second major division, called Central Illinois. Historically prairie, it is now mainly agricultural and known as the Heart of Illinois. It is characterized by small towns and medium–small cities. The western section (west of the Illinois River) was originally part of the Military Tract of 1812 and forms the conspicuous western bulge of the state. Agriculture, particularly corn and soybeans, as well as educational institutions and manufacturing centers, figure prominently in Central Illinois. Cities include Peoria; Springfield, the state capital; Quincy; Decatur; Bloomington-Normal; and Champaign-Urbana.

The third division is Southern Illinois, comprising the area south of U.S. Route 50, including Little Egypt, near the juncture of the Mississippi River and Ohio River. Southern Illinois is the site of the ancient city of Cahokia, as well as the site of the first state capital at Kaskaskia, which today is separated from the rest of the state by the Mississippi River. This region has a somewhat warmer winter climate, different variety of crops (including some cotton farming in the past), more rugged topography (due to the area remaining unglaciated during the Illinoian Stage, unlike most of the rest of the state), as well as small-scale oil deposits and coal mining. The Illinois suburbs of St. Louis, such as East St. Louis, are located in this region, and collectively, they are known as the Metro-East. The other somewhat significant concentration of population in Southern Illinois is the Carbondale-Marion-Herrin, Illinois Combined Statistical Area centered on Carbondale and Marion, a two-county area that is home to 123,272 residents. A portion of southeastern Illinois is part of the extended Evansville, Indiana, Metro Area, locally referred to as the Tri-State with Indiana and Kentucky. Seven Illinois counties are in the area.

In addition to these three, largely latitudinally defined divisions, all of the region outside the Chicago metropolitan area is often called "downstate" Illinois. This term is flexible, but is generally meant to mean everything outside the influence of the Chicago area. Thus, some cities in Northern Illinois, such as DeKalb, which is west of Chicago, and Rockford—which is actually north of Chicago—are sometimes incorrectly considered to be 'downstate'.

=== Climate ===
Köppen climate types of Illinois

Illinois has a climate that varies widely throughout the year. Because of its nearly 400-mile distance between its northernmost and southernmost extremes, as well as its mid-continental situation, most of Illinois has a humid continental climate (Köppen climate classification Dfa), with hot, humid summers and cold winters. The southern part of the state, from about Carbondale southward, has a humid subtropical climate (Koppen Cfa), with more moderate winters. Average yearly precipitation for Illinois varies from just over 48 in (1,219 mm) at the southern tip to about 35 in (889 mm) in the northern portion of the state. Normal annual snowfall exceeds 38 in (965 mm) in the Chicago area, while the southern portion of the state normally receives less than 14 in (356 mm). The all-time high temperature was 117 °F (47 °C), recorded on July 14, 1954, at East St. Louis, and the all-time low temperature was −38 °F (−39 °C), recorded on January 31, 2019, during the January 2019 North American cold wave at a weather station near Mount Carroll, and confirmed on March 5, 2019. This followed the previous record of −36 °F (−38 °C) recorded on January 5, 1999, near Congerville. Prior to the Mount Carroll record, a temperature of −37 °F (−38 °C) was recorded on January 15, 2009, at Rochelle, but at a weather station not subjected to the same quality control as official records.

Illinois averages approximately 51 days of thunderstorm activity a year, which ranks somewhat above average in the number of thunderstorm days for the United States. Illinois is vulnerable to tornadoes, with an average of 54 occurring annually, which puts much of the state at about five tornadoes per 10,000 sq mi (30,000 km^{2}) annually. Some of Tornado Alley's deadliest tornadoes on record have occurred in the state. The Tri-State Tornado of 1925 killed 695 people in three states; 613 of the victims died in Illinois.

Monthly normal high and low temperatures for various Illinois cities (°F)
| City | January | February | March | April | May | June | July | August | September | October | November | December |
|---|---|---|---|---|---|---|---|---|---|---|---|---|
| Cairo | 43/25 | 48/29 | 59/37 | 70/46 | 78/57 | 86/67 | 90/71 | 88/69 | 81/61 | 71/49 | 57/39 | 46/30 |
| Chicago | 31/16 | 36/21 | 47/31 | 59/42 | 70/52 | 81/61 | 85/65 | 83/65 | 75/57 | 64/45 | 48/34 | 36/22 |
| Edwardsville | 36/19 | 42/24 | 52/34 | 64/45 | 75/55 | 84/64 | 89/69 | 86/66 | 79/58 | 68/46 | 53/35 | 41/25 |
| Moline | 30/12 | 36/18 | 48/29 | 62/39 | 73/50 | 83/60 | 86/64 | 84/62 | 76/53 | 64/42 | 48/30 | 34/18 |
| Peoria | 31/14 | 37/20 | 49/30 | 62/40 | 73/51 | 82/60 | 86/65 | 84/63 | 77/54 | 64/42 | 49/31 | 36/20 |
| Rockford | 27/11 | 33/16 | 46/27 | 59/37 | 71/48 | 80/58 | 83/63 | 81/61 | 74/52 | 62/40 | 46/29 | 32/17 |
| Springfield | 33/17 | 39/22 | 51/32 | 63/42 | 74/53 | 83/62 | 86/66 | 84/64 | 78/55 | 67/44 | 51/34 | 38/23 |

=== Urban areas ===
Chicago is the largest city in the state and the third-most populous city in the United States, with a population of 2,746,388 in 2020. Furthermore, over 7 million residents of the Chicago metropolitan area reside in Illinois. The U.S. Census Bureau currently lists seven other cities with populations of over 100,000 within the state. This includes the Chicago satellite towns of Aurora, Joliet, Naperville, and Elgin, as well as the cities of Rockford, the most populous city in the state outside of the Chicago area; Springfield, the state's capital; and Peoria.

The most populated city in the state south of Springfield is Belleville, with 42,000 residents. It is located in the Metro East region of Greater St. Louis, the second-most populous urban area in Illinois with over 700,000 residents. Other major urban areas include the Peoria metropolitan area, Rockford metropolitan area, Champaign–Urbana metropolitan area (home to the University of Illinois), Springfield metropolitan area, the Illinois portion of the Quad Cities area, and the Bloomington–Normal metropolitan area.

Largest cities or towns in Illinois 2020 U.S. census
| Rank | Name | County | Pop. | Rank | Name | County | Pop. |
|---|---|---|---|---|---|---|---|
| 1 | Chicago | Cook | 2,746,388 | 11 | Cicero | Cook | 85,268 |
| 2 | Aurora | Kane | 180,542 | 12 | Schaumburg | Cook | 78,723 |
| 3 | Joliet | Will | 150,362 | 13 | Bloomington | McLean | 78,680 |
| 4 | Naperville | DuPage | 149,540 | 14 | Evanston | Cook | 78,110 |
| 5 | Rockford | Winnebago | 148,655 | 15 | Arlington Heights | Cook | 77,676 |
| 6 | Elgin | Kane, Cook | 114,797 | 16 | Bolingbrook | Will, DuPage | 73,922 |
| 7 | Springfield | Sangamon | 114,394 | 17 | Decatur | Macon | 70,522 |
| 8 | Peoria | Peoria | 113,150 | 18 | Palatine | Cook | 67,908 |
| 9 | Waukegan | Lake | 89,321 | 19 | Skokie | Cook | 67,824 |
| 10 | Champaign | Champaign | 88,302 | 20 | Des Plaines | Cook | 60,675 |

== Demographics ==
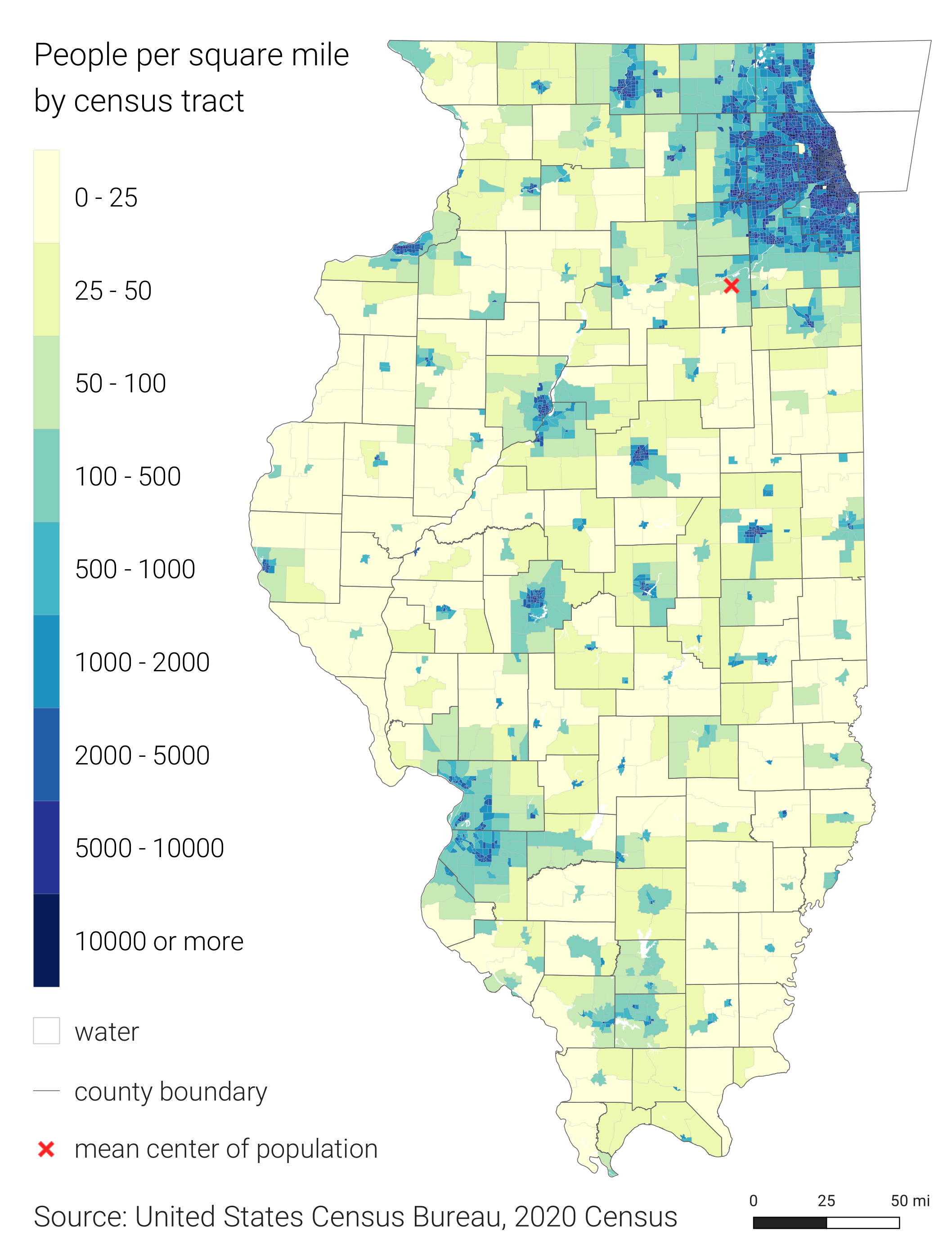
Illinois 2020 population density map

The United States Census Bureau found that the population of Illinois was 12,812,508 in the 2020 United States census, moving from the fifth-largest state to the sixth-largest state (losing out to Pennsylvania). Illinois' population slightly declined in 2020 from the 2010 United States census by just over 18,000 residents and the overall population was quite higher than recent census estimates.

Illinois is the most populous state in the Midwest region. Chicago, the third-most populous city in the United States, is the center of the Chicago metropolitan area or Chicagoland, as this area is nicknamed. Although the Chicago metropolitan area comprises only 9% of the land area of the state, it contains 75% of the state's residents, with 21.4% of Illinois' population living in the city of Chicago itself as of 2020. The five most populous counties in the state, as of 2024, are Cook (5,182,617), DuPage (937,142), Lake (718,604), Will (708,583), and Kane (520,997), all located in the Chicago metropolitan area. While the state's population has declined in recent years, according to the 2020 census, these losses do not arise from the Chicago metro area; rather the declines are from the Downstate counties. As of the 2020 census, the state's geographic mean center of population is located at 41° 18′ 43″N 88° 22 23″W in Grundy County, about six miles northwest of Coal City.

Illinois is the most racially and ethnically diverse state in the Midwestern United States. By several metrics, including racial and ethnic background, religious affiliation, and percentage of rural and urban divide, Illinois is the most representative of the larger demography of the United States.

Historical population
| Census | Pop. | Note | %± |
|---|---|---|---|
| 1800 | 2,458 | | — |
| 1810 | 12,282 | | 399.7% |
| 1820 | 55,211 | | 349.5% |
| 1830 | 157,445 | | 185.2% |
| 1840 | 476,183 | | 202.4% |
| 1850 | 851,470 | | 78.8% |
| 1860 | 1,711,951 | | 101.1% |
| 1870 | 2,539,891 | | 48.4% |
| 1880 | 3,077,871 | | 21.2% |
| 1890 | 3,826,352 | | 24.3% |
| 1900 | 4,821,550 | | 26.0% |
| 1910 | 5,638,591 | | 16.9% |
| 1920 | 6,485,280 | | 15.0% |
| 1930 | 7,630,654 | | 17.7% |
| 1940 | 7,897,241 | | 3.5% |
| 1950 | 8,712,176 | | 10.3% |
| 1960 | 10,081,158 | | 15.7% |
| 1970 | 11,113,976 | | 10.2% |
| 1980 | 11,426,518 | | 2.8% |
| 1990 | 11,430,602 | | 0.0% |
| 2000 | 12,419,293 | | 8.6% |
| 2010 | 12,830,632 | | 3.3% |
| 2020 | 12,812,508 | | −0.1% |
| 2025 (est.) | 12,719,141 | | −0.7% |
Source: 1910–2020

== Economy ==
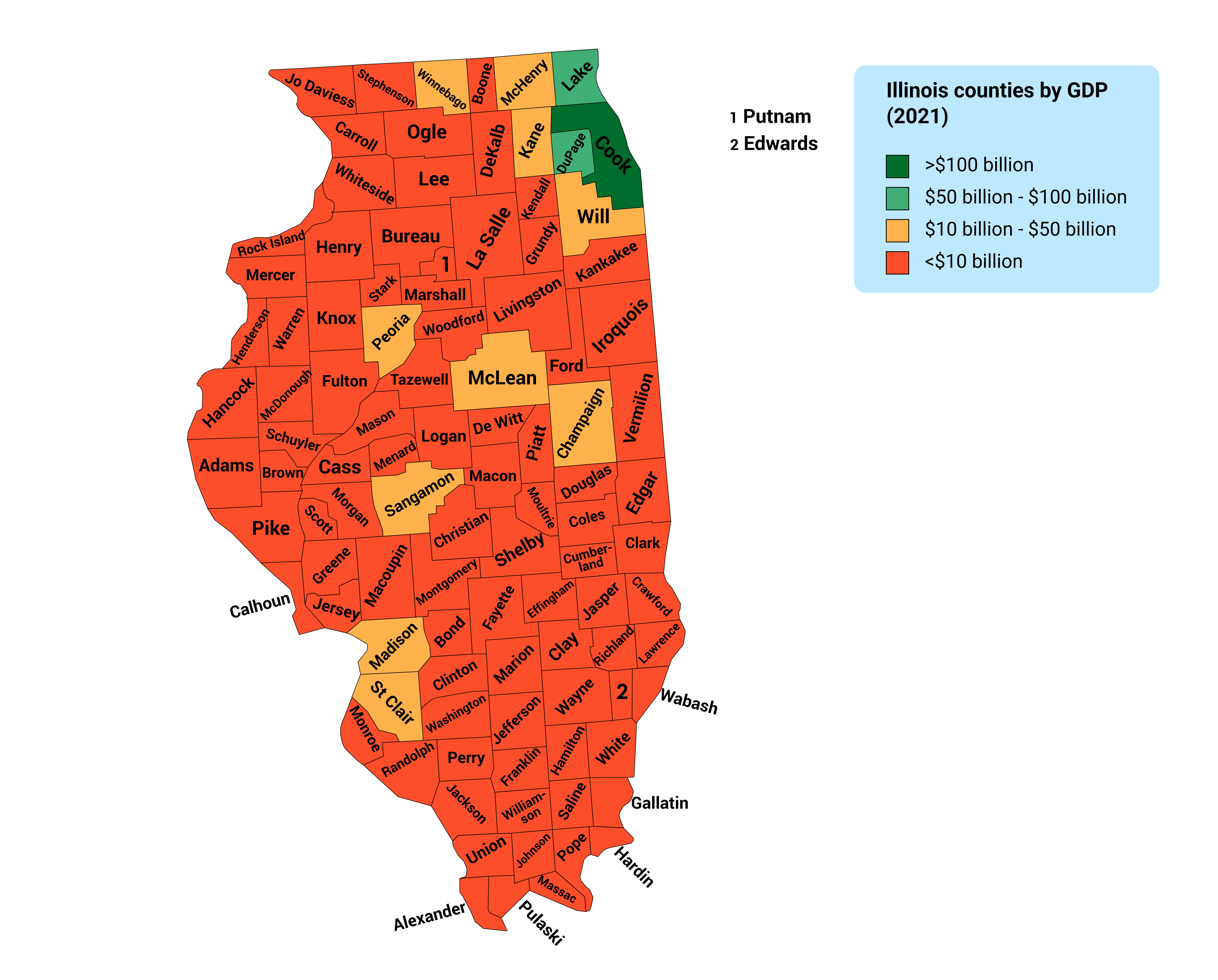
Illinois counties by GDP (2021)

In 2025, the gross state product for Illinois was $1.201 trillion and the state's per capita personal income was $77,772. Illinois has the 18th-largest economy in the world. In 2025, 99.6% of businesses in the state were small businesses, and employed 43.7% of Illinois's workforce. As of May 2025, the unemployment rate in Illinois was 4.8%.

As of 2026, Illinois's minimum wage is $15.00 per hour for employees over the age of 18. Tipped workers are to be paid a minimum of 60% of minimum wage.

=== Agriculture ===
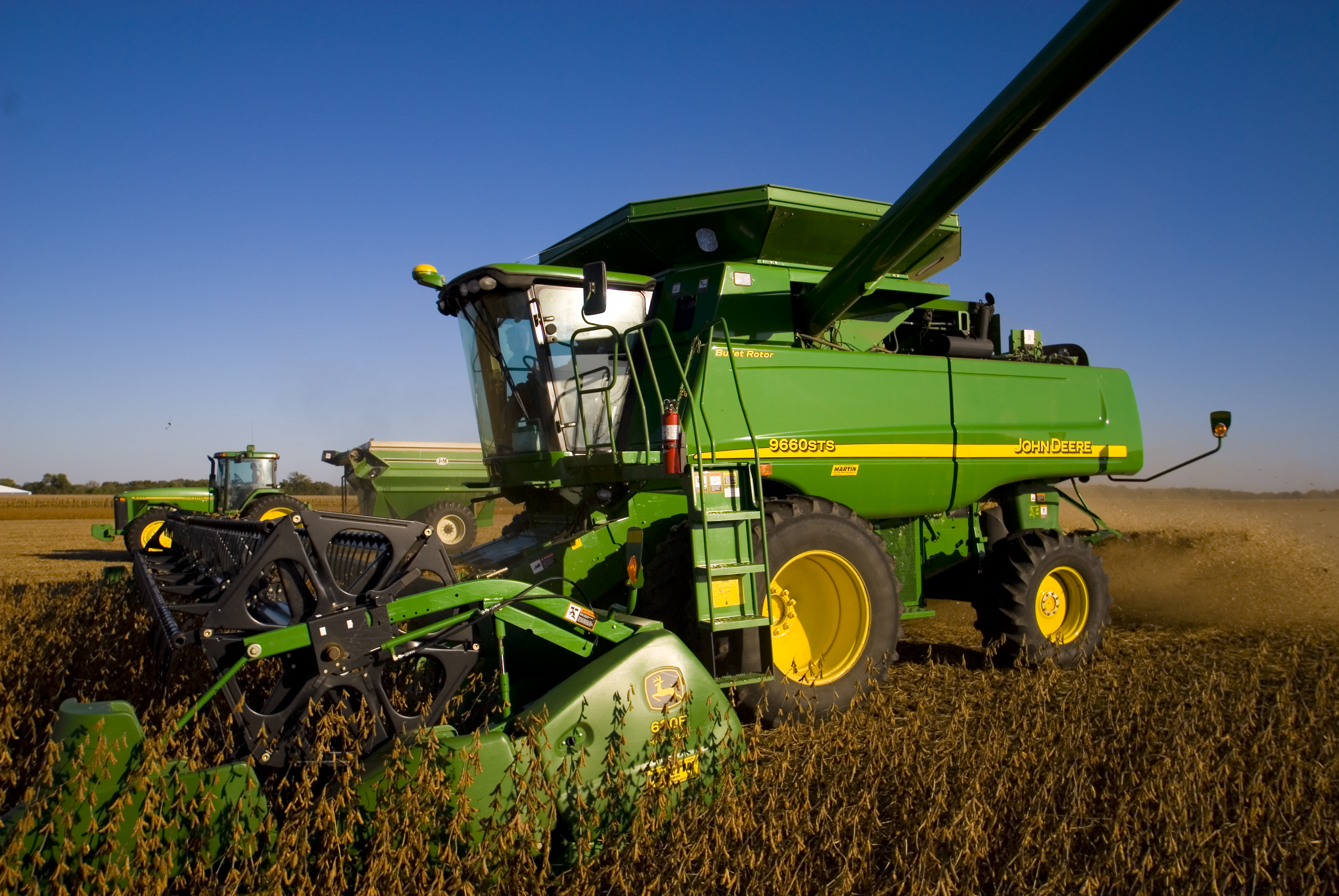
A John Deere combine harvester on an Illinois farm; the company is headquartered in Moline, Illinois.

Illinois's major agricultural outputs are corn, soybeans, hogs, cattle, dairy products, and wheat. In most years, Illinois is either the first or second state for the highest production of soybeans. For example, Illinois had a harvest of 648.9 million bushels (17.7 million metric tons) in 2023, ahead of Iowa's production of 573 million bushels (15.6 million metric tons). Illinois ranks second in U.S. corn production with more than 1.5 billion bushels produced annually. With a production capacity of 1.5 billion gallons per year, Illinois is a top producer of ethanol, ranking third in the United States in 2011. Illinois is a leader in food manufacturing and meat processing. Although Chicago may no longer be "Hog Butcher for the World", the Chicago area remains a global center for food manufacture and meat processing, with many plants, processing houses, and distribution facilities concentrated in the area of the former Union Stock Yards. Illinois also produces wine, and the state is home to two American viticultural areas. In the area of The Meeting of the Great Rivers Scenic Byway, peaches and apples are grown. The German immigrants from agricultural backgrounds who settled in Illinois in the mid- to late 19th century are in part responsible for the profusion of fruit orchards in that area of Illinois. Illinois's universities are actively researching alternative agricultural products as alternative crops.

=== Manufacturing ===
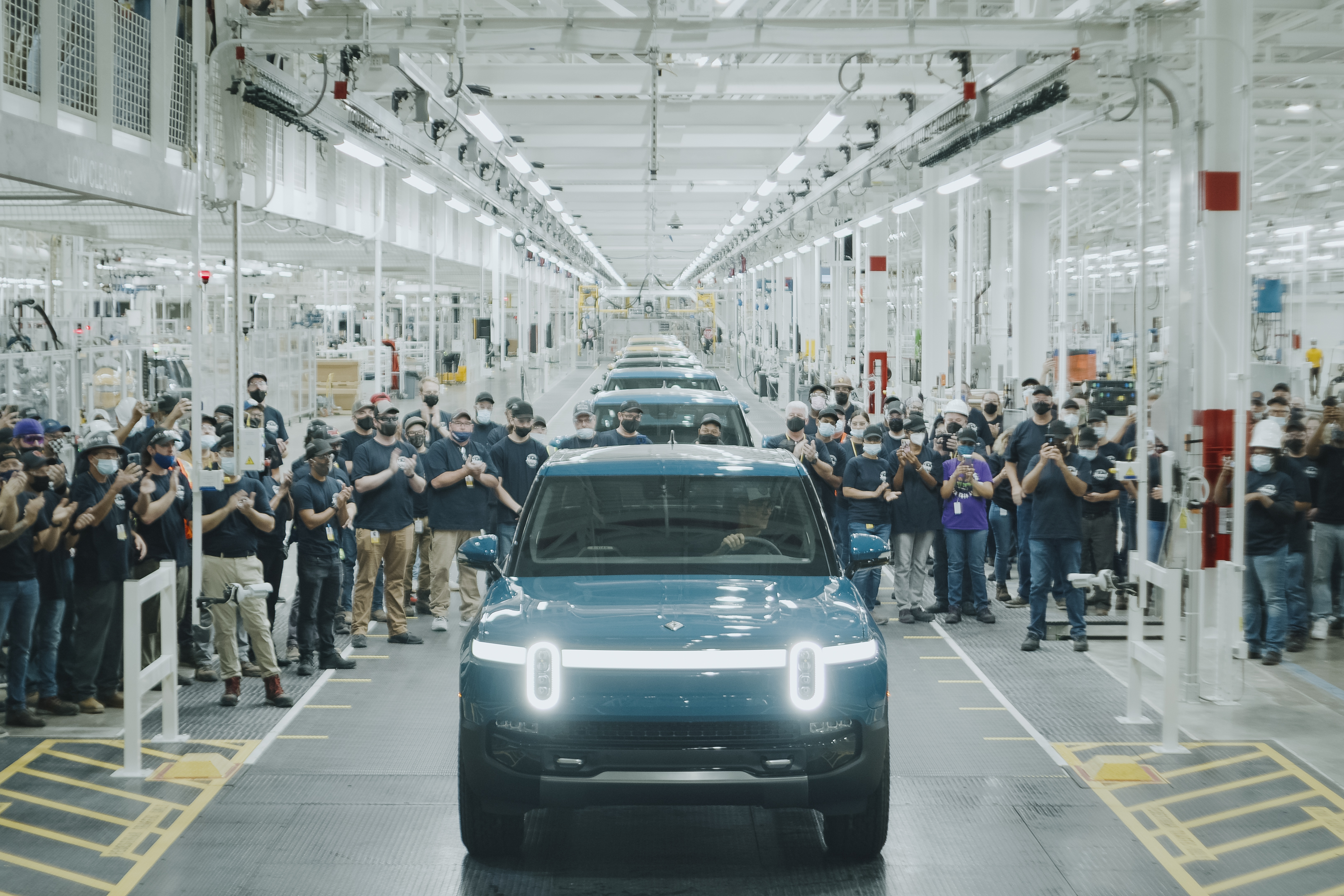
Rivian Automotive Plant in Normal.

Illinois is one of the nation's manufacturing leaders, boasting annual value added productivity by manufacturing of over $107 billion in 2006. As of 2011, Illinois is ranked as the 4th-most productive manufacturing state in the country, behind California, Texas, and Ohio. About three-quarters of the state's manufacturers are located in the Northeastern Opportunity Return Region, with 38 percent of Illinois's approximately 18,900 manufacturing plants located in Cook County. As of 2006, the leading manufacturing industries in Illinois, based upon value-added, were chemical manufacturing ($18.3 billion), machinery manufacturing ($13.4 billion), food manufacturing ($12.9 billion), fabricated metal products ($11.5 billion), transportation equipment ($7.4 billion), plastics and rubber products ($7.0 billion), and computer and electronic products ($6.1 billion).

Some of the largest manufacturing facilities in Illinois include Rivian Automotive in Normal, Ford Motor Company in Chicago, Stellantis North America in Belvidere, and Lion Electric in Joliet.

=== Services ===
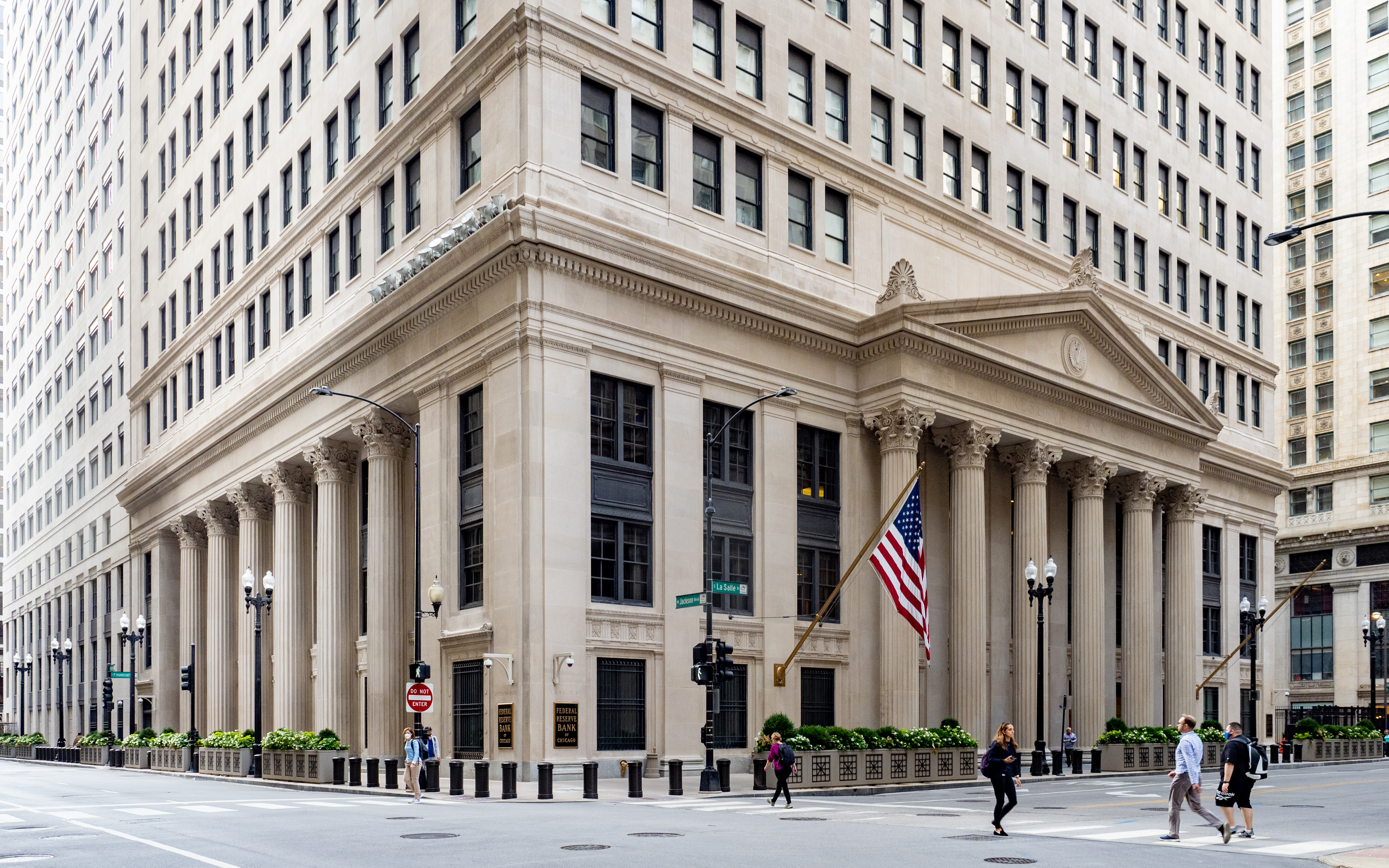
The Federal Reserve Bank of Chicago, one of twelve Federal Reserve Banks, at the heart of Chicago's financial center.

Trading floor in the Chicago Board of Trade Building

By the early 2000s, Illinois's economy had moved toward a dependence on high-value-added services, such as financial trading, higher education, law, logistics, and medicine. In some cases, these services clustered around institutions that hearkened back to Illinois's earlier economies. For example, the Chicago Mercantile Exchange, a trading exchange for global derivatives, had begun its life as an agricultural futures market. The Chicago Mercantile Exchange merged with the Chicago Board of Trade (CBOT) to form CME Group, one of the world's leading derivatives marketplaces and futures exchanges. CME Group owns the New York Mercantile Exchange and owns 27% of S&P Dow Jones Indices. Cboe Global Markets is the largest exchange for trading in options in the United States and the third-largest exchange for trading in equities. Other important non-manufacturing industries include publishing, tourism, and energy production and distribution.

Illinois is home to the headquarters of many Fortune 500 and Global 500 companies. They include Abbott, Abbvie, Ace Hardware, Allstate, Archer Daniels Midland, Baxter International, CDW, Exelon, GE Healthcare, Grainger, John Deere, Kraft Heinz, McDonald's, Motorola Solutions, Mondelez International, State Farm, Ulta Beauty, United Airlines, and Walgreens. Other notable companies include Aldi, BMO Bank, Conagra Brands, Country Financial, Dude Wipes, Groupon, Growmark, Grubhub, Hyatt, Jimmy John's, JLL, Medline, Morningstar, Inc, Sears, and US Foods. Until 2022, Illinois was also home to the headquarters of Boeing, Caterpillar, Citadel LLC, and Tyson Foods.

=== Investments ===
Venture capitalists funded a total of approximately $62 billion in the U.S. economy in 2016. Of this amount, Illinois-based companies received approximately $1.1 billion. Similarly, in FY 2016, the federal government spent $461 billion on contracts in the U.S. Of this amount, Illinois-based companies received approximately $8.7 billion.

=== Energy ===
Illinois is a net importer of fuels for energy, despite large coal resources and some minor oil production. Illinois exports electricity, ranking fifth among states in electricity production and seventh in electricity consumption.

==== Coal ====
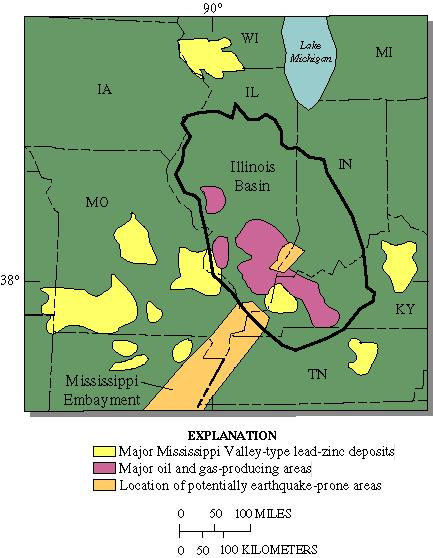
Location of the Illinois Basin

The coal industry of Illinois has its origins in the middle 19th century, when entrepreneurs such as Jacob Loose discovered coal in locations such as Sangamon County. Jacob Bunn contributed to the development of the Illinois coal industry. Coal mining in central and southern Illinois was important in the late 19th and early 20th centuries. The 1909 Cherry Mine disaster was an underground fire that killed 259 miners in the third worst disaster in the history of American coal mining. After 1940 there was a slow decline in coal mining. About 68% of Illinois has coal-bearing strata of the Pennsylvanian geologic period. According to the Illinois State Geological Survey, 211 billion tons of bituminous coal are estimated to lie under the surface, having a total heating value greater than the estimated oil deposits in the Arabian Peninsula. However, this coal has a high sulfur content, which causes acid rain, unless special equipment is used to reduce sulfur dioxide emissions. Many Illinois power plants are not equipped to burn high-sulfur coal. In 1999, Illinois produced 40.4 million tons of coal, but only 17 million tons (42%) of Illinois coal was consumed in Illinois. Most of the coal produced in Illinois is exported to other states and countries. In 2008, Illinois exported three million tons of coal and was projected to export nine million in 2011, as demand for energy grows in places such as China, India, and elsewhere in Asia and Europe. As of 2010, Illinois was ranked third in recoverable coal reserves at producing mines in the nation. Most of the coal produced in Illinois is exported to other states, while much of the coal burned for power in Illinois (21 million tons in 1998) is mined in the Powder River Basin of Wyoming.

==== Petroleum ====
Illinois is a leading refiner of petroleum in the American Midwest, with a combined crude oil distillation capacity of nearly 900,000 bbl/d (140,000 m^{3}/d). However, Illinois has very limited crude oil proved reserves that account for less than 1% of the U.S. total reserves. Residential heating is 81% natural gas compared to less than 1% heating oil. Illinois is ranked 14th in oil production among states, with a daily output of approximately 28,000 bbl (4,500 m^{3}) in 2005.

==== Nuclear power ====
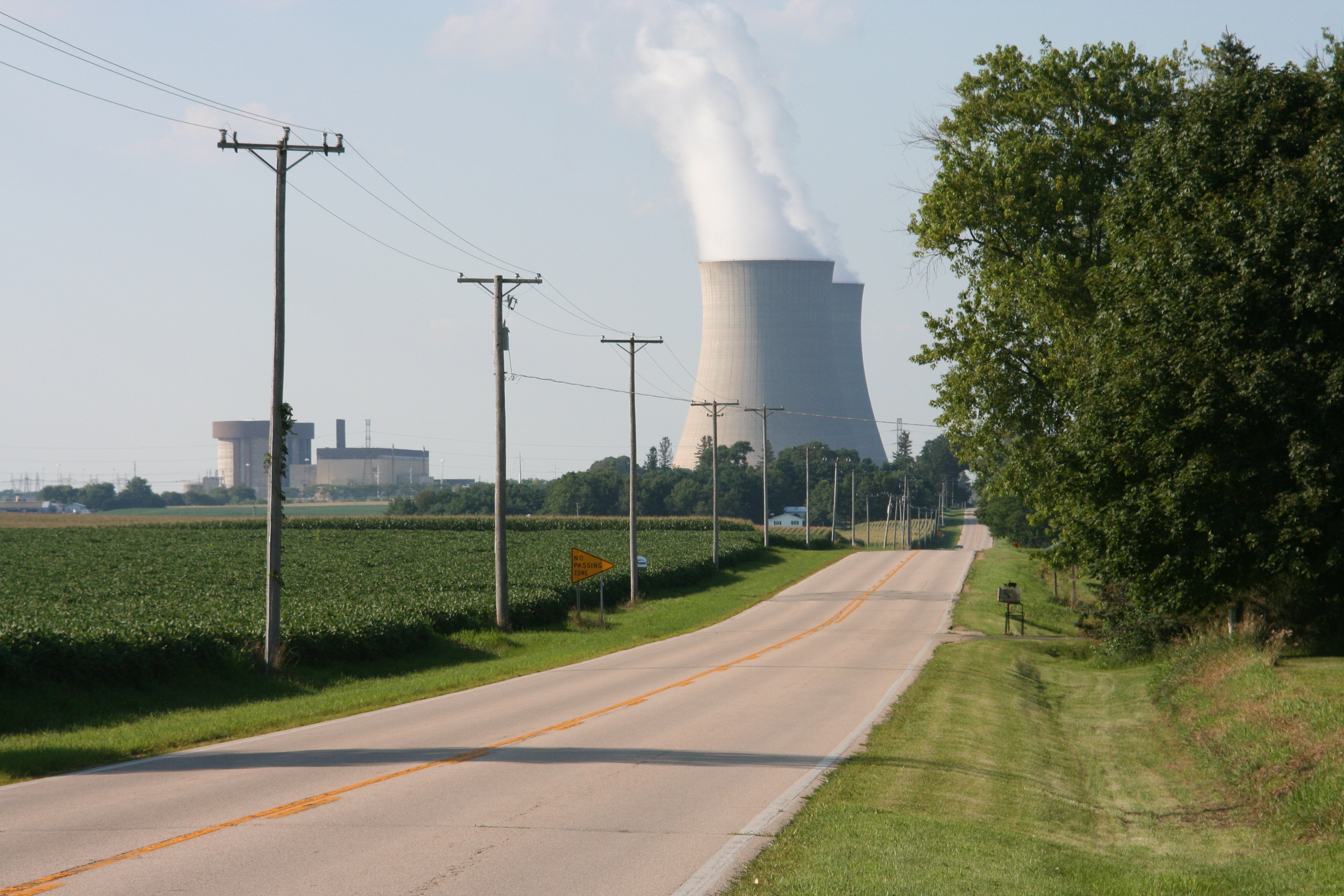
Byron Nuclear Generating Station in Ogle County

Worldwide nuclear power began in Illinois during 1942 with the Chicago Pile-1, the world's first artificial self-sustaining nuclear chain reaction in the world's first nuclear reactor, built on the University of Chicago campus. There are six operating nuclear power plants in Illinois: Braidwood, Byron, Clinton, Dresden, LaSalle, and Quad Cities. With the exception of the single-unit Clinton plant, each of these facilities has two reactors. Three reactors have been permanently shut down and are in various stages of decommissioning: Dresden-1 and Zion-1 and 2. Illinois ranked first in the nation in 2010 in both nuclear capacity and nuclear generation. Generation from its nuclear power plants accounted for 12 percent of the nation's total. In 2007, 48% of Illinois's electricity was generated using nuclear power. The Morris Operation is the only de facto high-level radioactive waste storage site in the United States.

==== Wind power ====
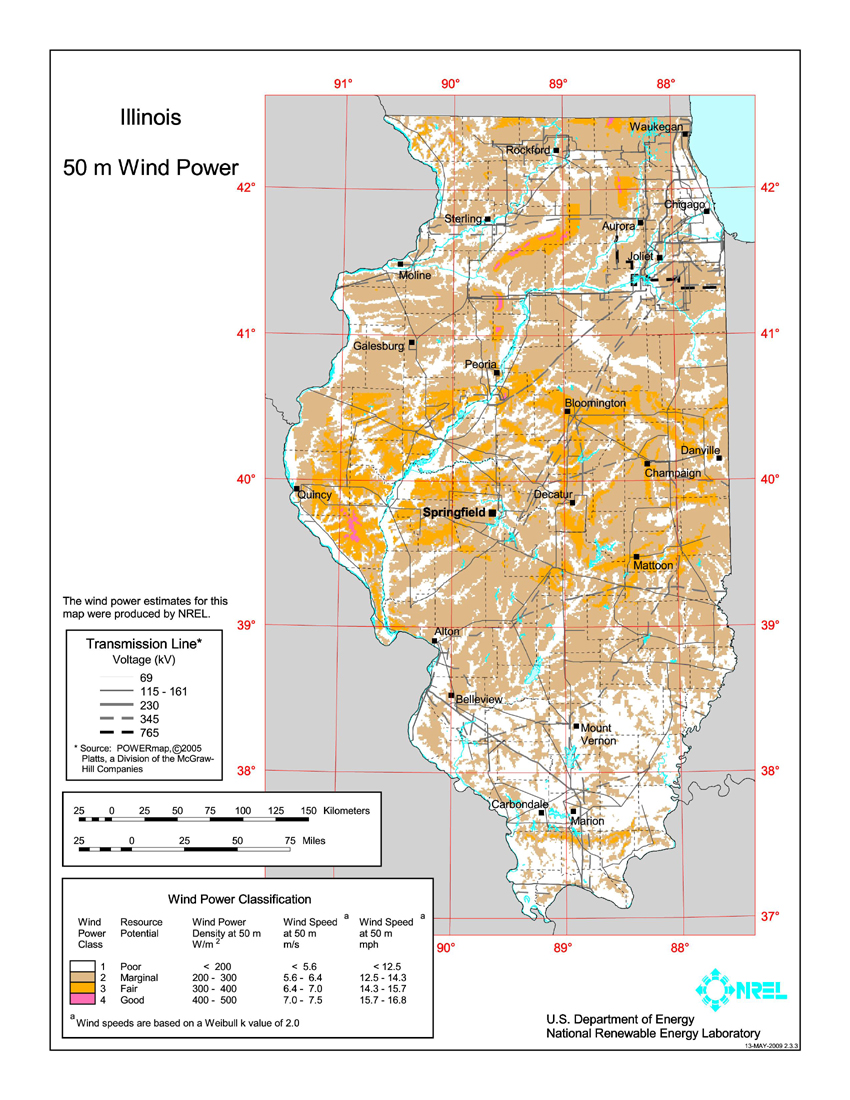
Average annual wind power distribution for Illinois, 50 m (160 ft) height above ground (2009)

Illinois has seen growing interest in the use of wind power for electrical generation. Most of Illinois was rated in 2009 as "marginal or fair" for wind energy production by the U.S. Department of Energy, with some western sections rated "good" and parts of the south rated "poor". These ratings are for wind turbines with 50 m (160 ft) hub heights; newer wind turbines are taller, enabling them to reach stronger winds farther from the ground. As a result, more areas of Illinois have become prospective wind farm sites. As of September 2009, Illinois had 1116.06 MW of installed wind power nameplate capacity with another 741.9 MW under construction. Illinois ranked ninth among U.S. states in installed wind power capacity and sixteenth by potential capacity. Large wind farms in Illinois include Twin Groves, Rail Splitter, EcoGrove, and Mendota Hills.

As of 2007, wind energy represented only 1.7% of Illinois's energy production, and it was estimated that wind power could provide 5–10% of the state's energy needs. Also, the Illinois General Assembly mandated in 2007 that by 2025, 25% of all electricity generated in Illinois is to come from renewable resources.

==== Biofuels ====
Illinois is ranked second in corn production among U.S. states, and Illinois corn is used to produce 40% of the ethanol consumed in the United States. The Archer Daniels Midland corporation in Decatur, Illinois, is the world's leading producer of ethanol from corn.

The National Corn-to-Ethanol Research Center (NCERC), the world's only facility dedicated to researching the ways and means of converting corn (maize) to ethanol is located on the campus of Southern Illinois University Edwardsville.

University of Illinois Urbana-Champaign is one of the partners in the Energy Biosciences Institute (EBI), a $500 million biofuels research project funded by petroleum giant BP.

=== Taxes ===
Tax is collected by the Illinois Department of Revenue. State income tax is calculated by multiplying net income by a flat rate. In 1990, that rate was set at 3%, but in 2010, the General Assembly voted for a temporary increase in the rate to 5%; the new rate went into effect on January 1, 2011; the personal income rate partially sunset on January 1, 2015, to 3.75%, while the corporate income tax fell to 5.25%. Illinois failed to pass a budget from 2015 to 2017, after the 736-day budget impasse, a budget was passed in Illinois after lawmakers overturned Governor Bruce Rauner's veto; this budget raised the personal income rate to 4.95% and the corporate rate to 7%. There are two rates for state sales tax: 6.25% for general merchandise and 1% for qualifying food, drugs, and medical appliances. The property tax is a major source of tax revenue for local government taxing districts. The property tax is a local—not state—tax imposed by local government taxing districts, which include counties, townships, municipalities, school districts, and special taxation districts. The property tax in Illinois is imposed only on real property.

On May 1, 2019, the Illinois Senate voted to approve a constitutional amendment that would have stricken language from the Illinois Constitution requiring a flat state income tax, in a 73–44 vote. If approved, the amendment would have allowed the state legislature to impose a graduated income tax based on annual income. The governor, J. B. Pritzker, approved the bill on May 27, 2019. It was scheduled for a 2020 general election ballot vote and required 60 percent voter approval to effectively amend the state constitution. The amendment was not approved by Illinoisans, with 55.1% of voters voting "No" on approval and 44.9% voting "Yes".

As of 2017 Chicago had the highest state and local sales tax rate for a U.S. city with a populations above 200,000, at 10.250%. The state of Illinois has the second highest rate of real estate tax: 2.31%, which is second only to New Jersey at 2.44%.

Toll roads are a de facto user tax on the citizens and visitors to the state of Illinois. Illinois ranks seventh out of the 11 states with the most miles of toll roads, at 282.1 miles. Chicago ranks fourth in most expensive toll roads in America by the mile, with the Chicago Skyway charging 51.2 cents per mile. Illinois also has the 11th highest gasoline tax by state, at 37.5 cents per gallon.

== Culture ==
=== Museums ===
Illinois has numerous museums; the greatest concentration of these are in Chicago. Several museums in Chicago are ranked as some of the best in the world. These include the John G. Shedd Aquarium, the Field Museum of Natural History, the Art Institute of Chicago, the Adler Planetarium, and the Museum of Science and Industry.

The modern Abraham Lincoln Presidential Library and Museum in Springfield is the largest and most attended presidential library in the country. The Barack Obama Presidential Center opened in June 2026, located in Jackson Park in Chicago. The Illinois State Museum boasts a collection of 13.5 million objects that tell the story of Illinois life, land, people, and art. The ISM is among only 5% of the nation's museums that are accredited by the American Alliance of Museums. Other historical museums in the state include the Polish Museum of America in Chicago; Magnolia Manor in Cairo; Easley Pioneer Museum in Ipava; the Elihu Benjamin Washburne; Ulysses S. Grant Homes, both in Galena; and the Chanute Air Museum, located on the former Chanute Air Force Base in Rantoul.

The Chicago metropolitan area also hosts two zoos: The Brookfield Zoo, located about ten miles west of the city center in suburban Brookfield, contains more than 2,300 animals and covers 216 acres (87 ha). Lincoln Park Zoo is located in Lincoln Park on Chicago's North Side, approximately 3 miles (4.8 km) north of the Loop. The zoo, including Nature Boardwalk, occupies 49 acres (20 ha) of the park.

Illinois Museums

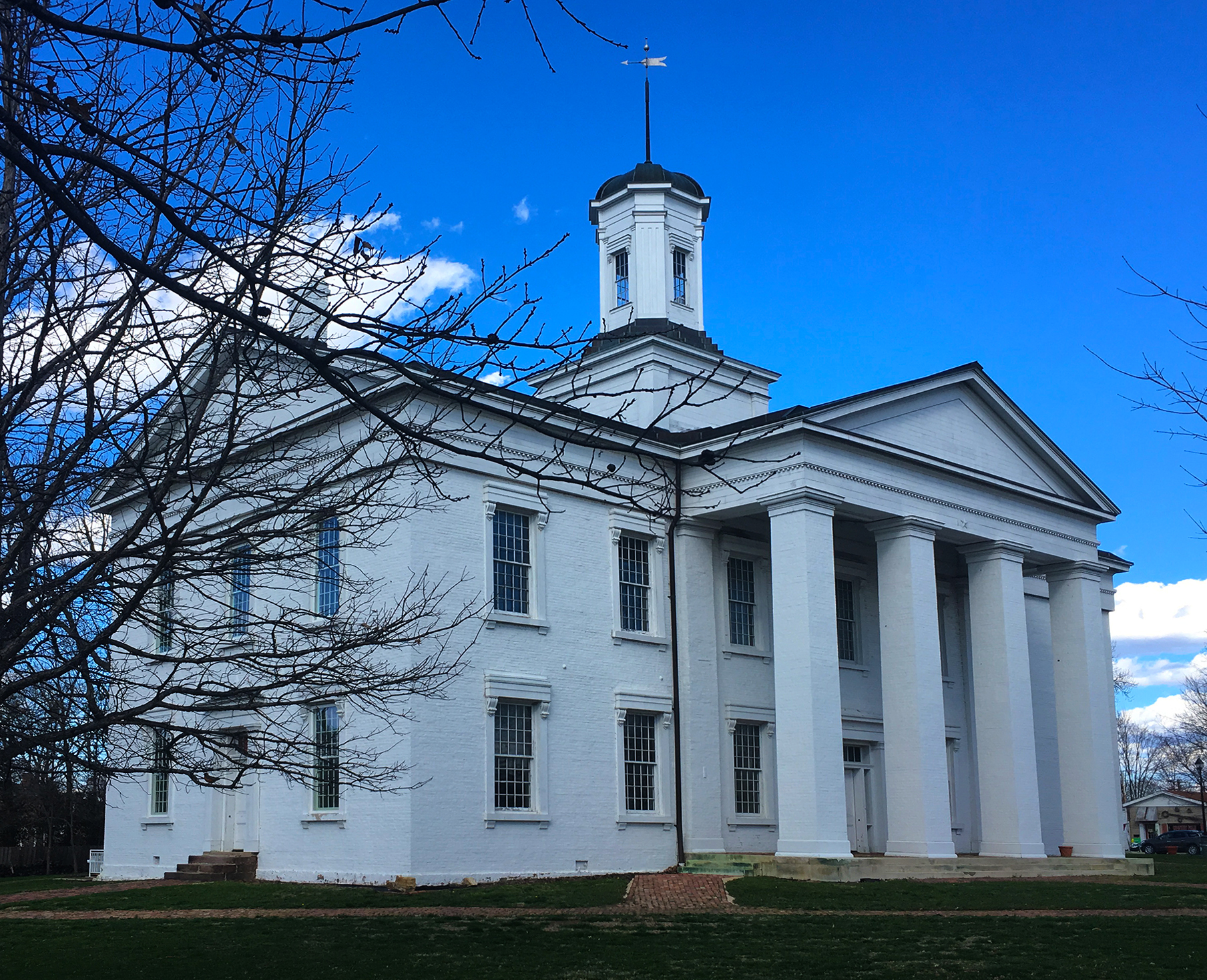
Vandalia State House State Historic Site in Vandalia

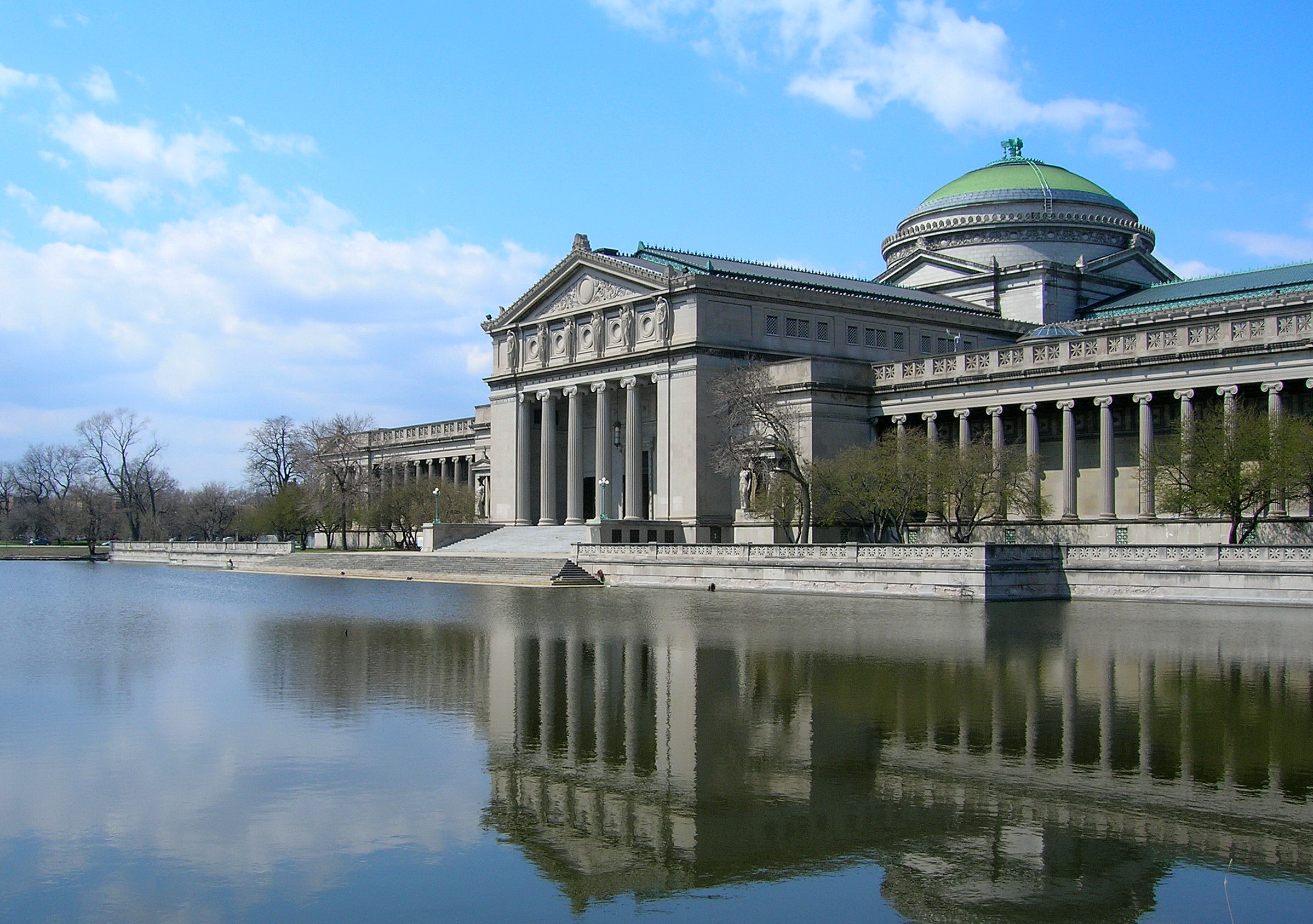
The Museum of Science and Industry in Chicago

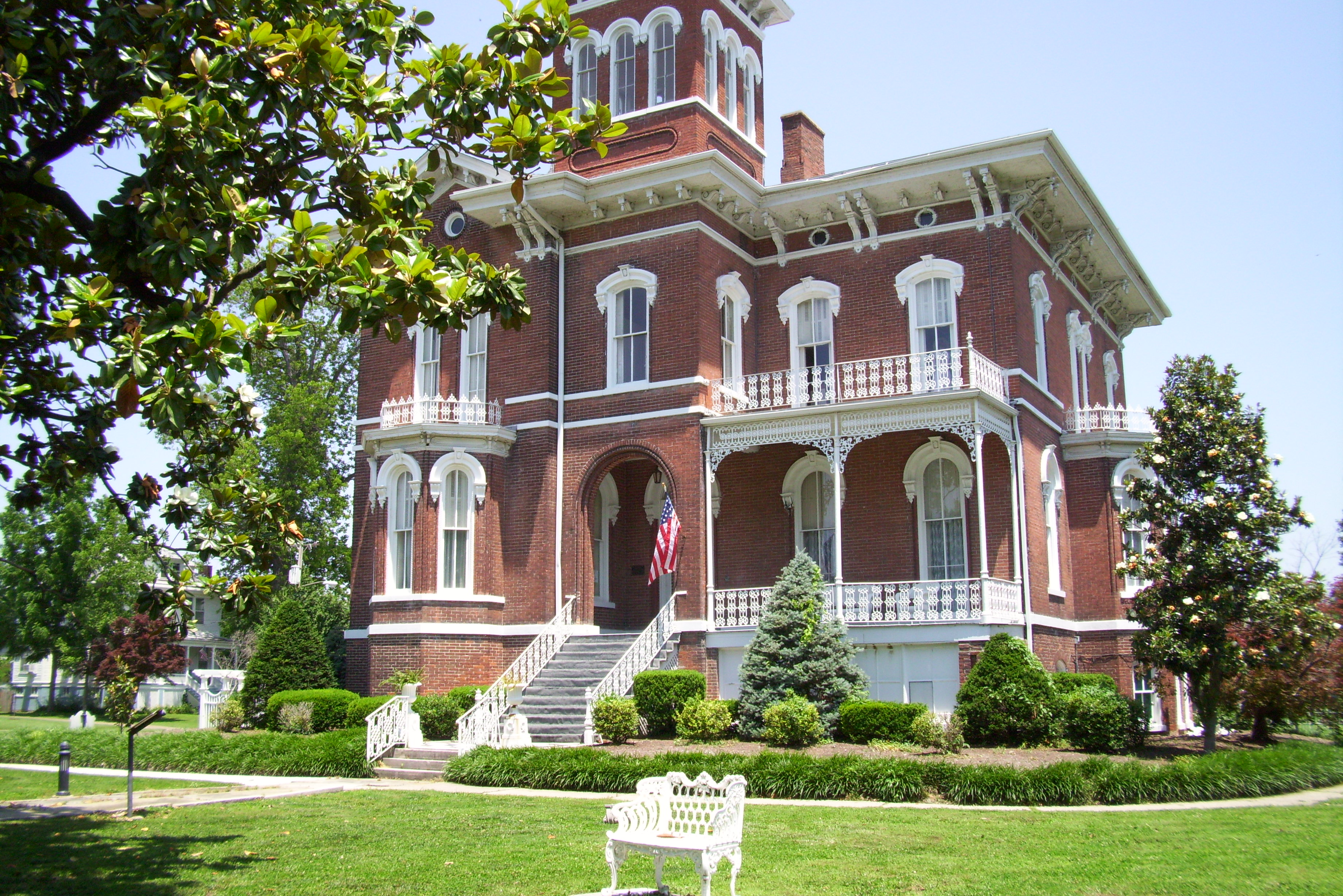
Magnolia Manor is a Victorian period historic house museum in Cairo.

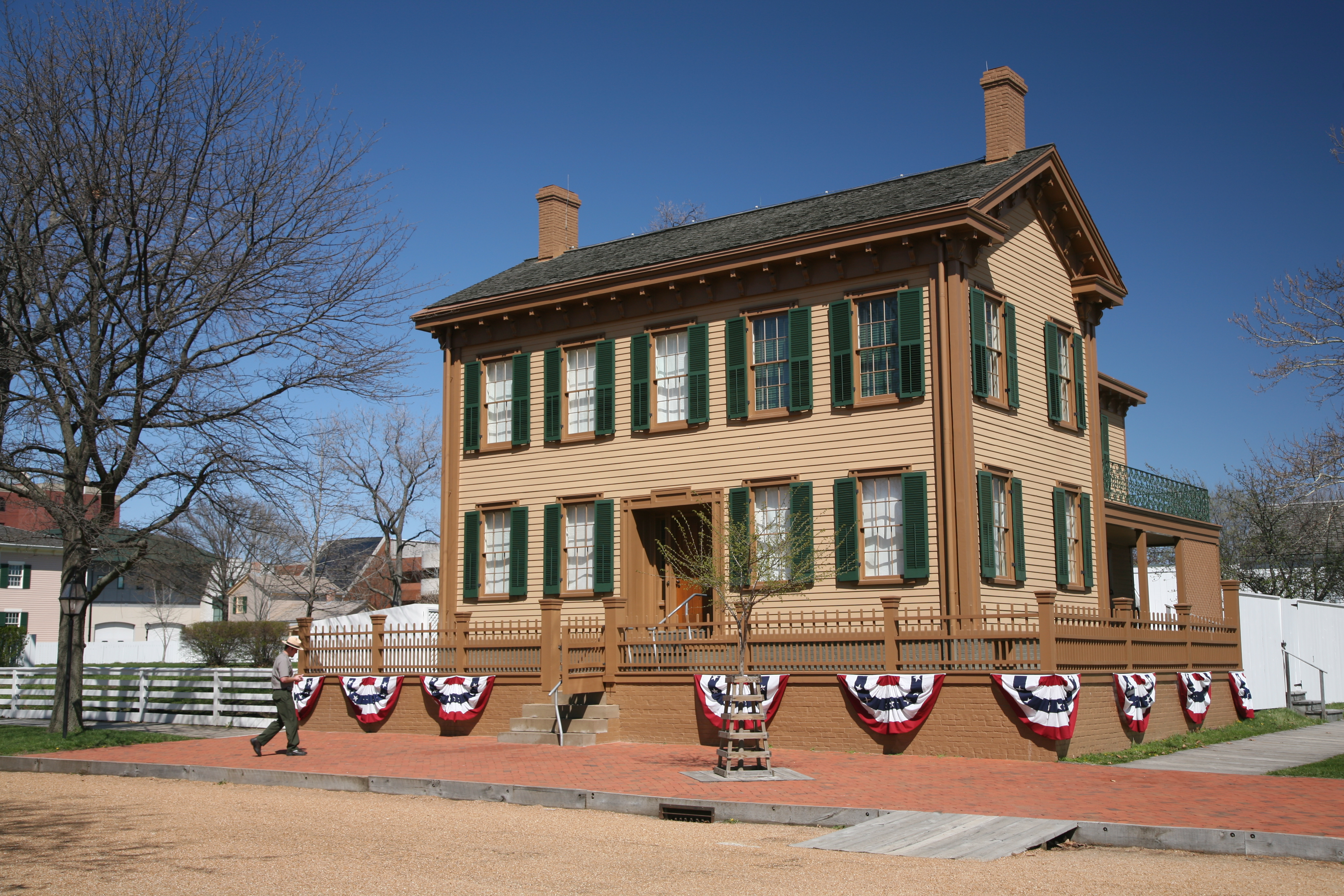
Lincoln Home National Historic Site in Springfield

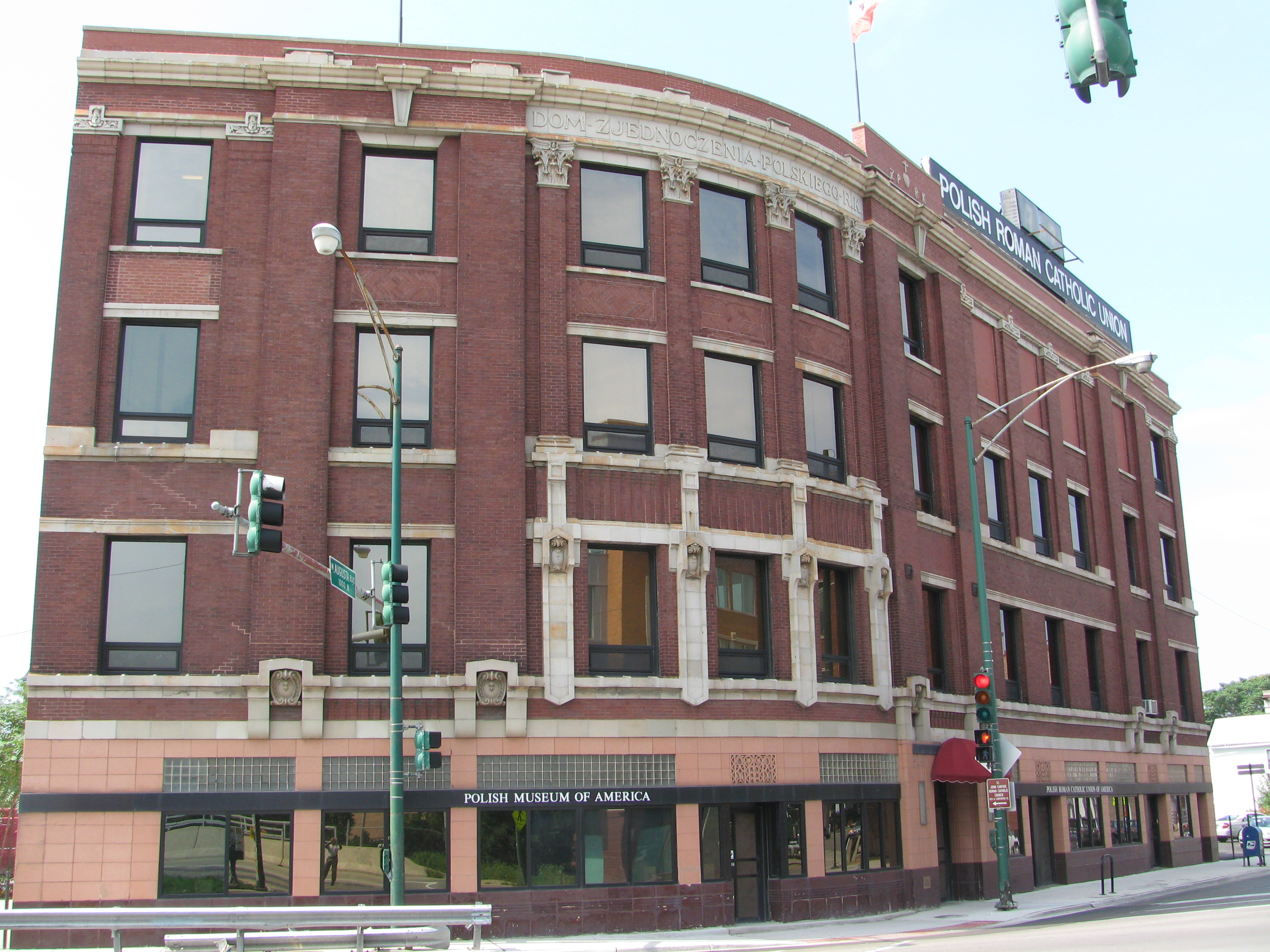
The Polish Museum of America in Chicago

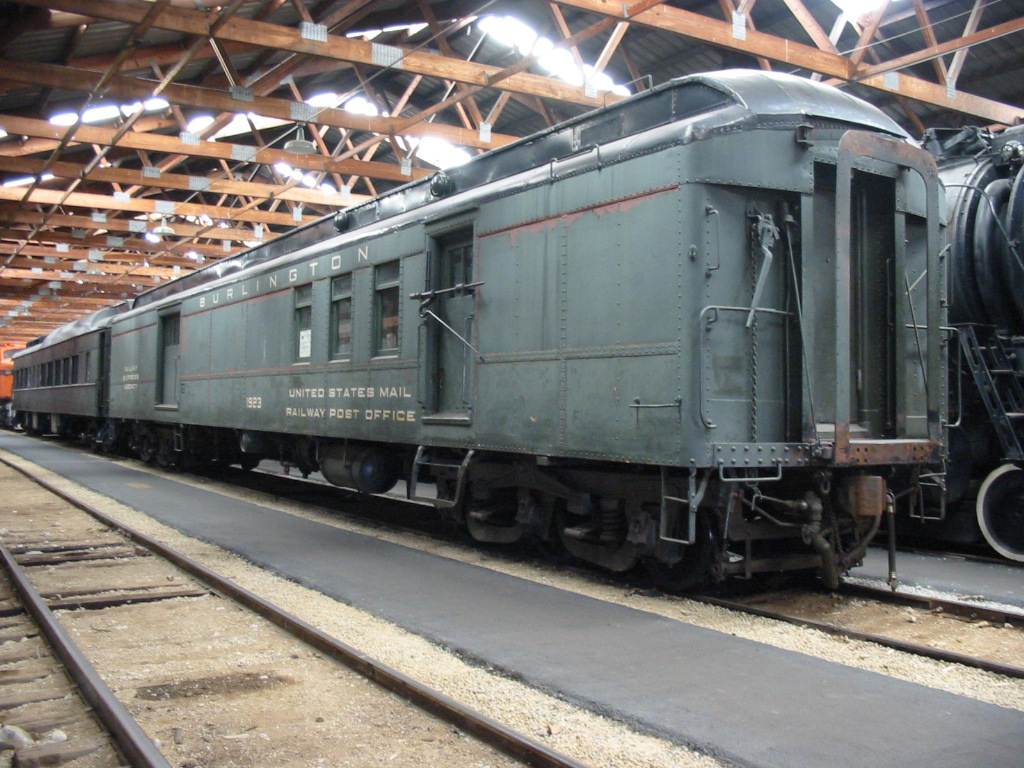
A Railway Post Office preserved at the Illinois Railway Museum in Union

=== Music ===
Illinois is a leader in music education, having hosted the Midwest Clinic International Band and Orchestra Conference since 1946, as well being home to the Illinois Music Educators Association (ILMEA, formerly IMEA), one of the largest professional music educator's organizations in the country. Each summer since 2004, Southern Illinois University Carbondale has played host to the Southern Illinois Music Festival, which presents dozens of performances throughout the region. Past featured artists include the Eroica Trio and violinist David Kim.

Chicago is a major center for music in the midwestern United States where distinctive forms of blues (greatly responsible for the future creation of rock and roll), and house music, a genre of electronic dance music, were developed.

The Great Migration of poor black workers from the South into the industrial cities brought traditional jazz and blues music to the city, resulting in Chicago blues and "Chicago-style" Dixieland jazz. Notable blues artists included Muddy Waters, Junior Wells, Howlin' Wolf and both Sonny Boy Williamsons; jazz greats included Nat King Cole, Gene Ammons, Benny Goodman, and Bud Freeman. Chicago is also well known for its soul music.

In the early 1930s, Gospel music began to gain popularity in Chicago due to Thomas A. Dorsey's contributions at Pilgrim Baptist Church.

In the 1980s and 1990s, heavy rock, punk, and hip-hop also became popular in Chicago. Orchestras in Chicago include the Chicago Symphony Orchestra, the Lyric Opera of Chicago, and the Chicago Sinfonietta.

=== Movies ===
John Hughes, who moved from Grosse Pointe to Northbrook, based many films of his in Chicago and its suburbs. Ferris Bueller's Day Off, Home Alone, The Breakfast Club, and all his films take place in the fictional Shermer, Illinois. (The original name of Northbrook was Shermerville, and Hughes's High School, Glenbrook North High School, is on Shermer Road.) Most locations in his films include Glenbrook North, the former Maine North High School, the Ben Rose House in Highland Park, and the famous Home Alone house in Winnetka, Illinois.

=== Recreation ===
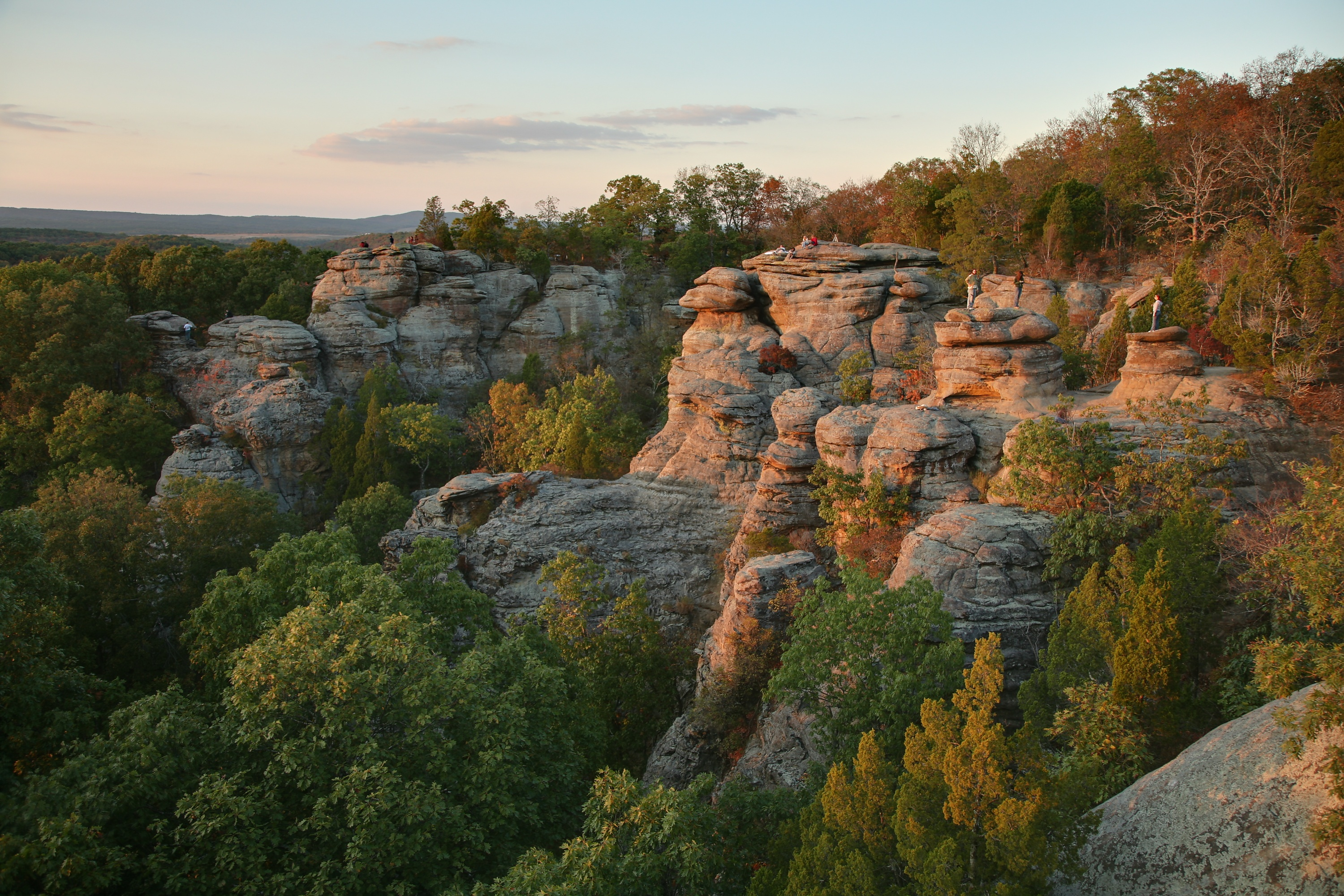
Sunset on the Garden of the Gods Wilderness, part of the Shawnee National Forest in southern Illinois.

The Illinois state parks system began in 1908 with what is now Fort Massac State Park, becoming the first park in a system encompassing more than 60 parks and about the same number of recreational and wildlife areas.

Areas under the protection of the National Park Service include: the Illinois and Michigan Canal National Heritage Corridor near Lockport, the Lewis and Clark National Historic Trail, the Lincoln Home National Historic Site in Springfield, the Mormon Pioneer National Historic Trail, the Trail of Tears National Historic Trail, the American Discovery Trail, the Pullman National Monument, and New Philadelphia Town Site. The federal government also manages the Shawnee National Forest and the Midewin National Tallgrass Prairie.

=== Sports ===
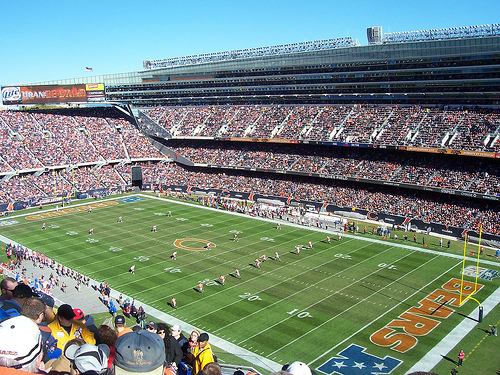
Soldier Field is home to the National Football League's Chicago Bears

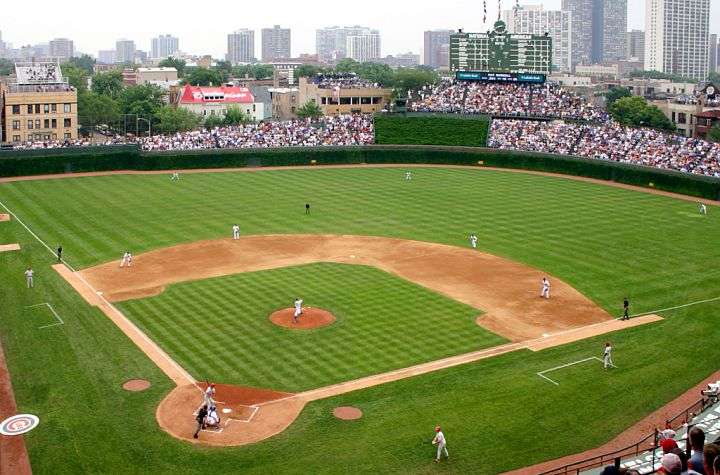
Wrigley Field is home to Major League Baseball's Chicago Cubs

As one of the United States' major metropolises, all major sports leagues have teams headquartered in Chicago.

Two Major League Baseball teams are located in the state. The Chicago Cubs of the National League play in the second-oldest major league stadium, Wrigley Field, and went the longest length of time without a championship in all of major American sport, from 1908 to 2016, when they won the World Series. The Chicago White Sox of the American League won the World Series in 2005, their first since 1917. They play on the city's south side at Rate Field. The Chicago Bears football team has won nine total NFL Championships, the last occurring in Super Bowl XX on January 26, 1986. The Chicago Bulls of the NBA is one of the most recognized basketball teams in the world, largely as a result of the efforts of Michael Jordan, who led the team to six NBA championships in eight seasons in the 1990s. The Chicago Blackhawks of the NHL began playing in 1926 and became a member of the Original Six once the NHL dropped to that number of teams during World War II. The Blackhawks have won six Stanley Cups, most recently in 2015. Chicago Fire FC is a member of MLS and has been one of the league's most successful and best-supported clubs since its founding in 1997, winning one league and four Lamar Hunt U.S. Open Cups in that timespan. The team played in Bridgeview, adjacent to Chicago from 2006 to 2019. The team now plays at Soldier Field in Chicago.

Chicago Stars FC, known in the past as the Chicago Red Stars, has played at the top level of U.S. women's soccer since its formation in 2009, except in the 2011 season. The team currently plays in the National Women's Soccer League at Martin Stadium on the campus of Northwestern University. The Chicago Sky have played in the Women's National Basketball Association (WNBA) since 2006. The Sky won their first WNBA Championship in 2021. They play at Wintrust Arena in Chicago. The Chicago Bandits of the NPF, a women's softball league, have won four league titles, most recently in 2016. They play at Parkway Bank Sports Complex in Rosemont, Illinois, in the Chicago area.

Many minor league teams also call Illinois their home. They include the Bloomington Edge of the Indoor Football League, Bloomington Flex of the Midwest Professional Basketball Association, Chicago Dogs of the American Association of Professional Baseball, Chicago Fire FC II of MLS Next Pro, Chicago Wolves of the American Hockey League, Gateway Grizzlies of the Frontier League, Kane County Cougars of the American Association, Joliet Slammers of the Frontier League, Peoria Chiefs of the Midwest League, Peoria Rivermen of the SPHL, Rockford Aviators of the Frontier League, Rockford IceHogs of the AHL, Schaumburg Boomers of the Frontier League, Southern Illinois Miners in the Frontier League, Windy City Bulls of the NBA G League, and Windy City ThunderBolts of the Frontier League.

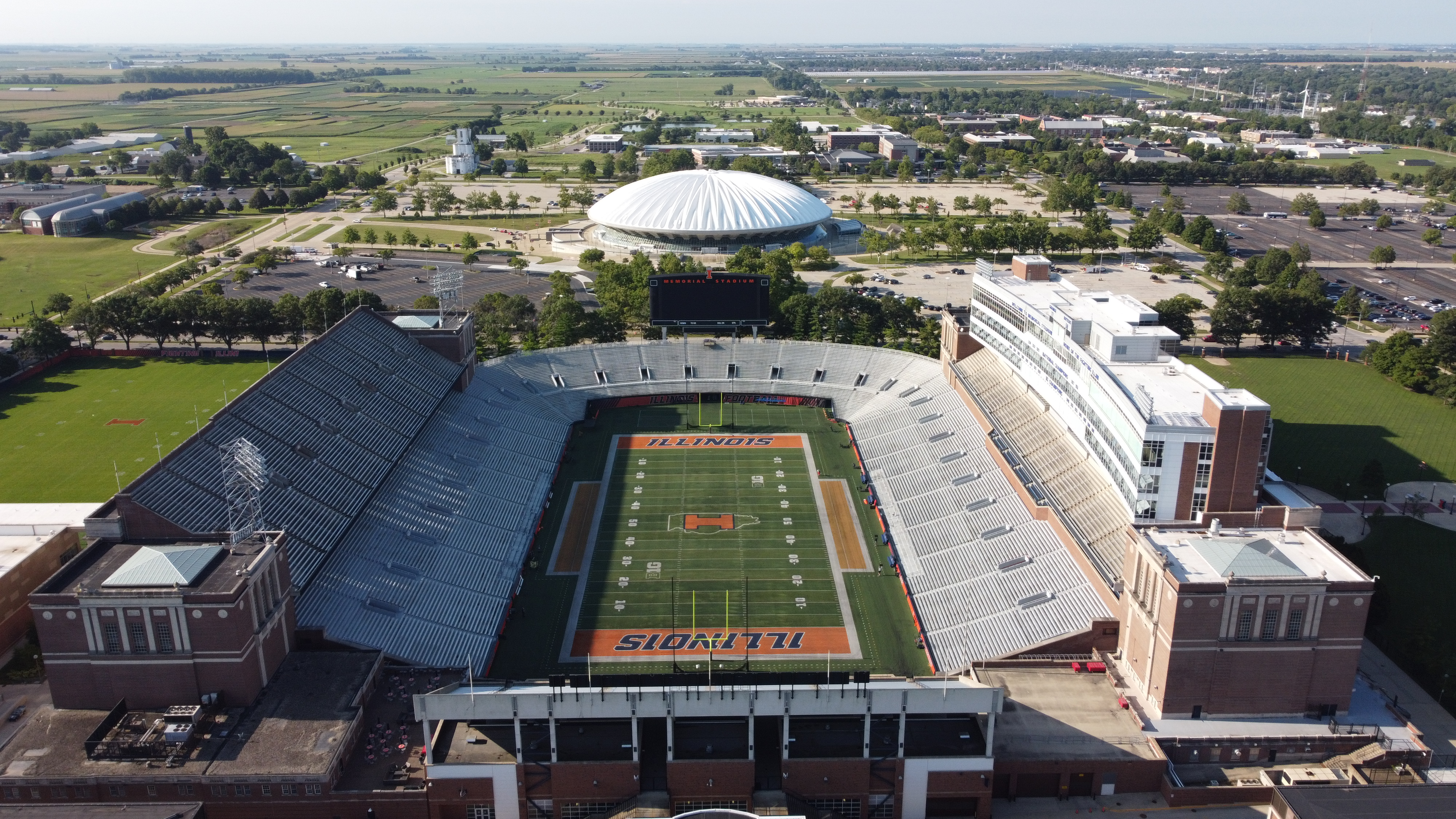
Gies Memorial Stadium and State Farm Center at the University of Illinois Urbana-Champaign

The state features 13 athletic programs that compete in NCAA Division I, the highest level of U.S. college sports. The two most prominent are the Illinois Fighting Illini and Northwestern Wildcats, both members of the Big Ten Conference and the only ones competing in the "Power Four conferences". The Fighting Illini football team has won five national championships and three Rose Bowl Games, whereas the men's basketball team has won 17 conference seasons and played five Final Fours. Meanwhile, the Wildcats have won eight football conference championships and one Rose Bowl Game. The Northern Illinois Huskies returned to the Horizon League in 2026 after an absence of nearly 30 years; with that conference not sponsoring football, the Huskies moved that sport to the Mountain West Conference. During their most recent tenure in the Mid-American Conference (1997–2026), the Huskies won four conference championships and earning a bid in the Orange Bowl. Five schools have football programs that compete in the second level of Division I football, the Football Championship Subdivision. The Illinois State Redbirds and Southern Illinois Salukis are members of the Missouri Valley Conference for non-football sports and the Missouri Valley Football Conference. The Eastern Illinois Panthers and Western Illinois Leathernecks are members of the Ohio Valley Conference. The Chicago State Cougars are playing their first season of varsity football in 2026 as an FCS independent; after that season, the football team will join the rest of the Cougars' sports in the NEC (historically known as the Northeast Conference). The city of Chicago is home to three Division I programs that do not sponsor football: the DePaul Blue Demons of the Big East Conference, Loyola Ramblers of the Atlantic 10 Conference, and UIC Flames of the Missouri Valley Conference. Finally, two non-football Division I programs are located downstate. The Bradley Braves are Missouri Valley Conference members, and the SIU Edwardsville Cougars compete in the Ohio Valley Conference.

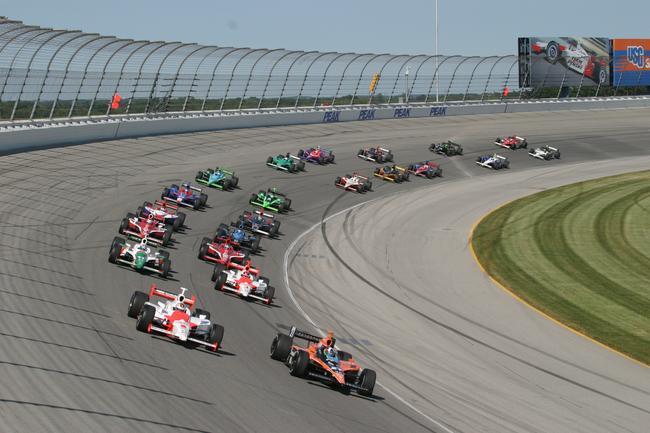
Chicagoland Speedway

Motor racing oval tracks at the Chicagoland Speedway in Joliet, the Chicago Motor Speedway in Cicero and the Gateway Motorsports Park in Madison, near St. Louis, have hosted NASCAR, CART, and IRL races, whereas the Sports Car Club of America, among other national and regional road racing clubs, have visited the Autobahn Country Club in Joliet, the Blackhawk Farms Raceway in South Beloit and the former Meadowdale International Raceway in Carpentersville. Illinois also has several short tracks and dragstrips. The dragstrip at Gateway International Raceway and the Route 66 Raceway, which sits on the same property as the Chicagoland Speedway, both host NHRA drag races.

Illinois features several golf courses, such as Olympia Fields, Medinah, Midlothian, Cog Hill, and Conway Farms, which have often hosted the BMW Championship, Western Open, and Women's Western Open. Also, the state has hosted 13 editions of the U.S. Open (latest at Olympia Fields in 2003), six editions of the PGA Championship (latest at Medinah in 2006), three editions of the U.S. Women's Open (latest at The Merit Club), the 2009 Solheim Cup (at Rich Harvest Farms), and the 2012 Ryder Cup (at Medinah). The John Deere Classic is a regular PGA Tour event played in the Quad Cities since 1971, whereas the Encompass Championship is a Champions Tour event since 2013. Previously, the LPGA State Farm Classic was an LPGA Tour event from 1976 to 2011.

== Law and politics ==
In a 2020 study, Illinois was ranked as the 4th easiest state for citizens to vote in.

=== State government ===
JB Pritzker (D)
Governor

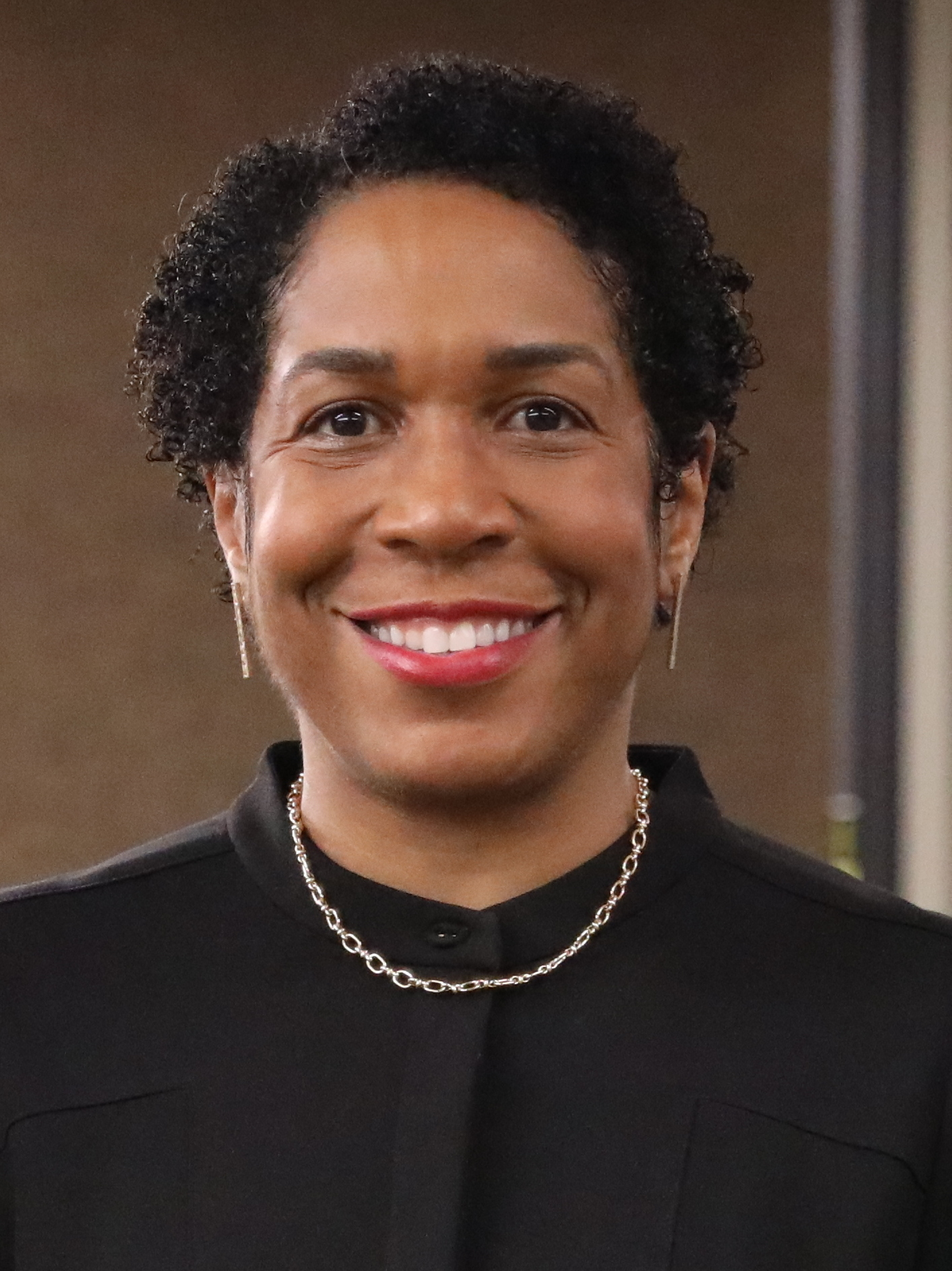
Juliana Stratton (D)
Lieutenant Governor

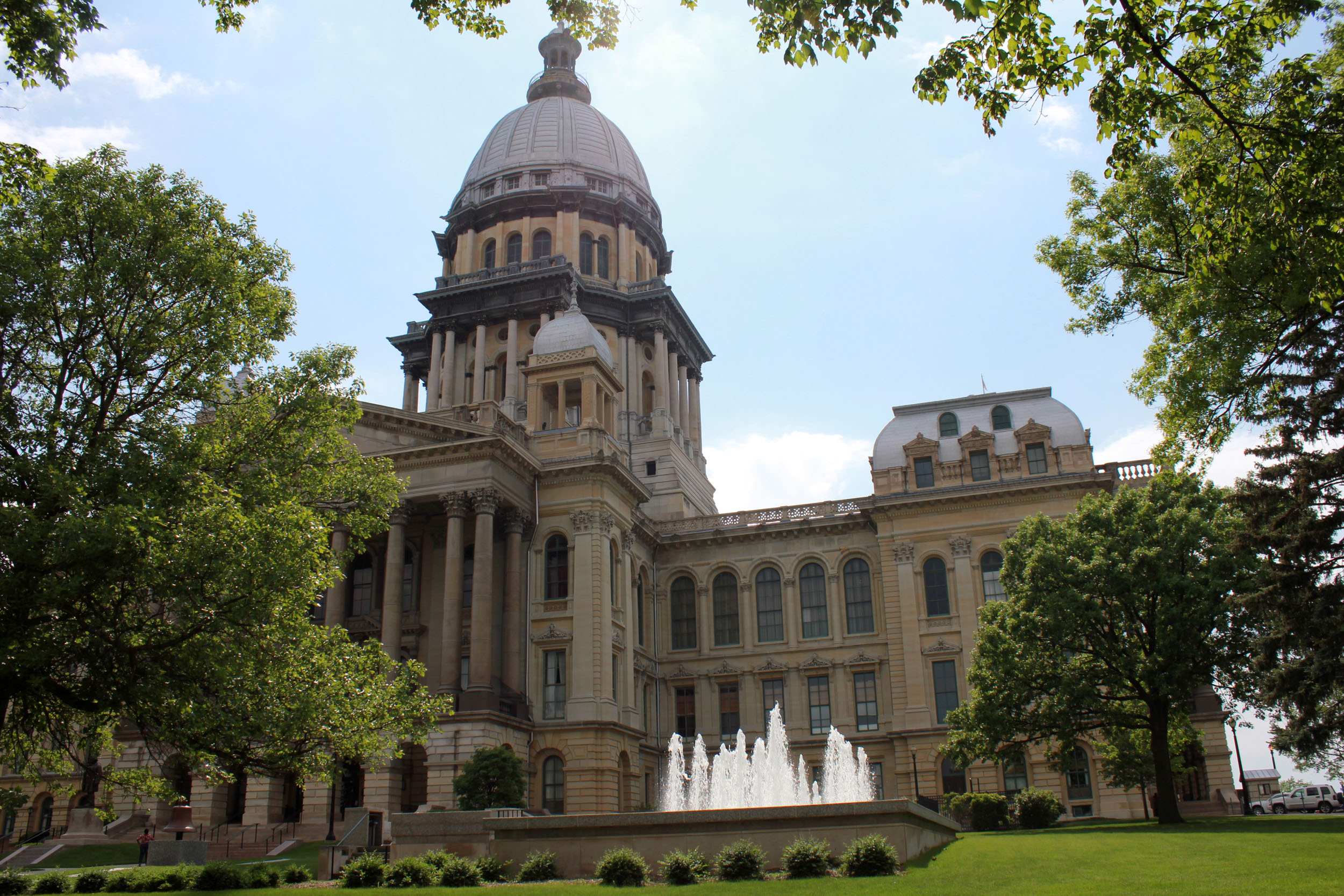
The Illinois State Capitol in Springfield

The government of Illinois, under the Constitution of Illinois, has three branches of government: executive, legislative, and judicial. The executive branch is split into several statewide elected offices, with the governor as chief executive. Legislative functions are granted to the Illinois General Assembly. The judiciary is composed of the Supreme Court and lower courts.

The executive branch is composed of six elected officers and their offices as well as numerous other departments. The six elected officers are: Governor, Lieutenant Governor, Attorney General, Secretary of State, Comptroller, and Treasurer. The government of Illinois has numerous departments, agencies, boards and commissions, but the so-called code departments provide most of the state's services. Since 2019, the Governor of Illinois is JB Pritzker of the Democratic Party.

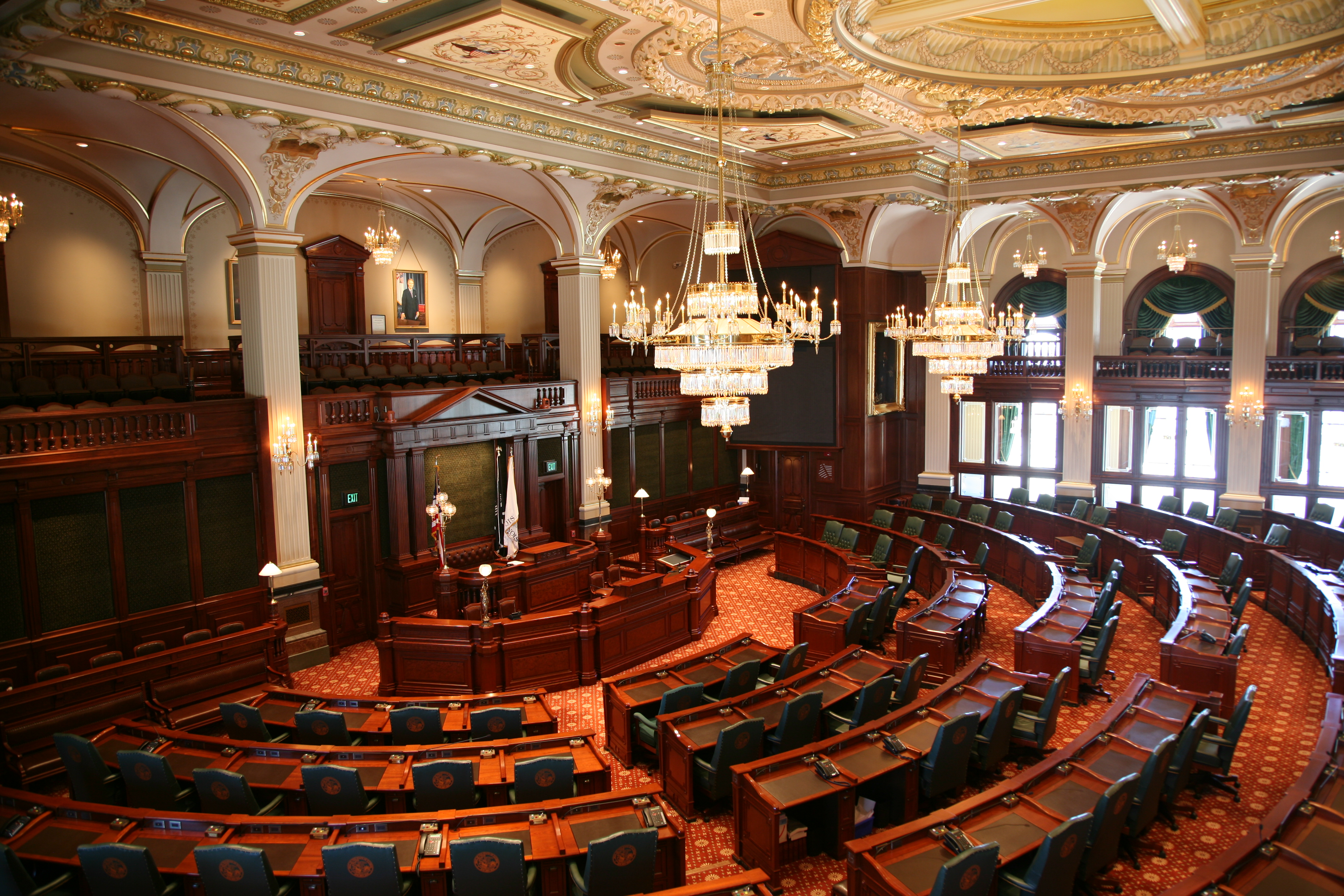
Illinois House of Representatives

The Illinois General Assembly is the state legislature, composed of the 118-member Illinois House of Representatives and the 59-member Illinois Senate. The members of the General Assembly are elected at the beginning of each even-numbered year. The Illinois Compiled Statutes (ILCS) are the codified statutes of a general and permanent nature.

The Judiciary of Illinois is the unified court system of Illinois. It consists of the Supreme Court, Appellate Court, and Circuit Courts. The Supreme Court oversees the administration of the court system.

The administrative divisions of Illinois are counties, townships, precincts, cities, towns, villages, and special-purpose districts. The basic subdivision of Illinois are the 102 counties. Eighty-five of the 102 counties are in turn divided into townships and precincts. Municipal governments are the cities, villages, and incorporated towns. Some localities possess home rule, which allows them to govern themselves to a certain extent.

=== Federal representation ===
Since 2023, Illinois is divided into 17 congressional districts. Each district sends one member to represent them in the U.S. House of Representatives. Since congressional districts are based on population, the majority of districts are located in the Chicago metropolitan area. Since the 2026 U.S. House elections, Illinois is represented by 14 Democrats and 3 Republicans. Like all other states, Illinois has two senators in the U.S. Senate. The state's senior senator is Dick Durbin of Springfield, who is also the Senate Minority Whip, and its junior senator is Tammy Duckworth of Hoffman Estates. Both Durbin and Duckworth are members of the Democratic Party. Since the 2024 U.S. presidential election, Illinois sends 19 electors to the Electoral College.

In addition to Durbin, other Illinois federal politicians have served in high-ranking congressional positions. Dennis Hastert (R) served as Speaker of the U.S. House of Representatives from 1999 to 2007. Rahm Emanuel (D) served as Chair of the House Democratic Caucus from 2007 to 2009 under Nancy Pelosi. Everett McKinley Dirksen (R) served as Senate Minority Leader from 1959 to 1969. Dan Rostenkowski (D) served as Chair of the House Ways and Means Committee from 1981 to 1994.

=== Party balance ===
In modern national and state politics, Illinois is a Democratic stronghold. Historically, Illinois was a political swing state, with near-parity existing between the Republican and the Democratic parties. However, in recent elections, the Democratic Party has gained ground, and Illinois has come to be seen as a solid "blue" state in both presidential and congressional campaigns. Illinois's Democratic tendencies are mostly attributable to Cook County and Chicago, by far the state's largest county and city, respectively, which have long been strongly Democratic. The collar counties, affluent suburban counties that surround Cook County, historically voted Republican and helped keep the state competitive; however, they have swung toward the left in recent elections as the national Republican Party has become increasingly conservative, which has cemented Democratic dominance in state politics. Outside of the Chicago metropolitan area, the state's rural areas are heavily Republican. Other downstate counties such as Peoria, Champaign, McLean (Bloomington/Normal), Rock Island (Quad Cities), and St. Clair (East St. Louis) have trended Democratic in recent presidential and gubernatorial elections, each at their own pace, unlike most their neighbors. The dominance of the Chicago area in state elections is so overwhelming that it has influenced a secessionist movement in the downstate region.

Illinois was long seen as a national bellwether, supporting the winner in every election in the 20th century, except for 1916 and 1976. Since the 1992 election, however, Illinois has trended more toward the Democratic Party and is part of the "blue wall" of states that have consistently voted Democratic in the last six presidential elections. In 2000, George W. Bush became the first Republican to win the presidency without carrying either Illinois or Vermont, with Donald Trump repeating the feat in 2016 and 2024. Illinois has not elected a Republican to the U.S. Senate since Mark Kirk won in 2010; the last Republicans to hold statewide office were Governor Bruce Rauner and Lieutenant Governor Evelyn Sanguinetti, who both left office in 2019. The Democratic Party of Illinois has supermajorities in both chambers of the Illinois General Assembly. Of the state's 17 congressional districts, 14 are represented by Democrats. The county boards of the state's five most populous counties (Cook, DuPage, Lake, Will, and Kane) have Democratic majorities along with some of the more populous downstate counties such as St. Clair, Champaign, Peoria, McLean, and Rock Island. In 2026, JB Prtizker won a third consecutive term as governor with nearly 60% of the vote, making him the first Democrat to do so in Illinois history and became the first Democrat to win McHenry County (one of the five Chicagoland collar counties) since 1852. Democrats have won six of the last seven gubernatorial elections (2002, 2006, 2010, 2018, 2022, and 2026).

=== History of corruption ===
Politics in the state have been infamous for highly visible corruption cases, as well as for crusading reformers, such as governors Adlai Stevenson and James R. Thompson. In 2006, former governor George Ryan was convicted of racketeering and bribery, leading to a six-and-a-half-year prison sentence. On December 7, 2011, former governor Rod Blagojevich was sentenced to 14 years in prison for allegations that he conspired to sell the vacated Senate seat left by President Barack Obama to the highest bidder. Blagojevich had earlier been impeached and convicted by the legislature, resulting in his removal from office. In the late 20th century, Congressman Dan Rostenkowski was imprisoned for mail fraud; former governor and federal judge Otto Kerner Jr. was imprisoned for bribery; Secretary of State Paul Powell was investigated and found to have gained great wealth through bribes, and State Auditor of Public Accounts (Comptroller) Orville Hodge was imprisoned for embezzlement. In 1912, William Lorimer, the GOP boss of Chicago, was expelled from the U.S. Senate for bribery, and in 1921, Governor Len Small was found to have defrauded the state of a million dollars. Michael Madigan, Illinois' House Speaker for all but two years from 1983 to 2021, was sentenced to seven years in prison in 2025. Having served as chair of the Democratic Party of Illinois concurrent with his speakership since 1997, Madigan was arguably the most powerful politician in Illinois.

=== U.S. presidential elections ===
2024 U.S. presidential election results by county in Illinois

Illinois has shown a strong presence in presidential elections. Three presidents have claimed Illinois as their political base when running for president: Abraham Lincoln, Ulysses S. Grant, and most recently Barack Obama. Lincoln was born in Kentucky, but he moved to Illinois at age 21. He served in the General Assembly and represented the 7th congressional district in the U.S. House of Representatives before his election to the presidency in 1860. Ulysses S. Grant was born in Ohio and had a military career that precluded settling down, but on the eve of the Civil War and approaching middle age, he moved to Illinois and thus utilized the state as his home and political base when running for president. Barack Obama was born in Hawaii and made Illinois his home after graduating from law school, and later represented Illinois in the U.S. Senate. He was then elected president in 2008, running as a candidate from his Illinois base.

Ronald Reagan was born in Illinois, in the city of Tampico, raised in Dixon, Illinois, and educated at Eureka College, outside Peoria. Reagan later moved to California during his young adulthood. He then became an actor, and later became California's Governor before being elected president.

Hillary Clinton was born and raised in the suburbs of Chicago and became the first woman to represent a major political party in the general election of the U.S. presidency. Clinton ran from a platform based in New York State.

=== African-American U.S. senators ===
Twelve African-Americans have served as members of the United States Senate. Of which three have represented Illinois, the most of any single state: Carol Moseley-Braun, Barack Obama, and Roland Burris, who was appointed to replace Obama after his election to the presidency. Moseley-Braun was the first African-American woman to become a U.S. Senator.

=== Political families ===
Several families from Illinois have played particularly prominent roles in politics, in both the Republican Party earlier in the state's history but more recently the Democratic Party, gaining both statewide and national fame.

==== Ingersoll ====
The Ingersoll family of Illinois comprised a pair of brothers who held several prominent elected positions representing Illinois.

- Ebon C. Ingersoll (1831–1879), Illinois State Representative 1856, U.S. Representative from Illinois 1864–71. Brother of Robert G. Ingersoll.
- Robert G. Ingersoll (1833–1899), Illinois State Representative 1860, Attorney General of Illinois 1867–69, delegate to the Republican National Convention 1876. Brother of Ebon C. Ingersoll.
  - John C. Ingersoll (1860–1903), U.S. Consul in Cartagena, Colombia 1902. Son of Ebon C. Ingersoll.

==== Stevenson ====
The Stevenson family, initially rooted in central Illinois and later based in the Chicago metropolitan area, has provided four generations of Illinois officeholders.

- Adlai Stevenson I (1835–1914) was a Vice President of the United States, as well as a Congressman
- Lewis Stevenson (1868–1929), son of Adlai, served as Illinois Secretary of State.
- Adlai Stevenson II (1900–1965), son of Lewis, served as Governor of Illinois and as the U.S. Ambassador to the United Nations; he was also the Democratic party's presidential nominee in 1952 and 1956, losing both elections to Dwight Eisenhower.
- Adlai Stevenson III (1930–2021), son of Adlai II, served ten years as a United States Senator.

==== Daley ====
The Daley family's powerbase was in Chicago.

- Richard J. Daley (1902–1976) served as Mayor of Chicago from 1955 to his death. He also served Cook County State's Attorney from 1980 to 1989 and in the Illinois Senate from 1973 to 1980/
- Richard M. Daley (born 1942), son of Richard J, was Chicago's longest-serving mayor, in office from 1989 to 2011.
- William M. Daley (born 1948), another son of Richard J, is a former White House Chief of Staff under President Barack Obama and 32nd United States Secretary of Commerce under President Bill Clinton.
- John P. Daley (born 1946), second-youngest child of Richard J, is a member of the Cook County Board of Commissioners since 1992, representing the 11th district.
- Patrick Daley Thompson (born 1969), grandson of Richard J and nephew of Richard M, served on the Chicago City Council representing the 11th ward from 2015 until his resignation in 2022.

==== Pritzker ====
The Pritzker family is based in Chicago and have played important roles in both the private and the public sectors.

- Jay Pritzker (1922–1999), co-founder of Hyatt Hotel based in Chicago.
- Penny Pritzker (born 1959), 38th United States Secretary of Commerce under President Barack Obama.
- J. B. Pritzker (born 1965), current and 43rd governor of Illinois and co-founder of the Pritzker Group.

==== Madigan ====
Members of the Madigan family have held extensive influence in Illinois politics.

- Michael Madigan (born 1942), longtime speaker of the Illinois House of Representatives and notorious political boss.
- Lisa Madigan (born 1966), adopted daughter of Michael Madigan, former Illinois Attorney General.

== Education ==
=== Illinois State Board of Education ===
The Illinois State Board of Education (ISBE) is autonomous of the governor and the state legislature, and administers public education in the state. Local municipalities and their respective school districts operate individual public schools, but the ISBE audits performance of public schools with the Illinois School Report Card. The ISBE also makes recommendations to state leaders concerning education spending and policies.

=== Primary and secondary schools ===
Education is compulsory for ages 7–17 in Illinois. Schools are commonly, but not exclusively, divided into three tiers of primary and secondary education: elementary school, middle school or junior high school, and high school. District territories are often complex in structure. Many areas in the state are actually located in two school districts—one for high school and the other for elementary and middle schools. And such districts do not necessarily share boundaries. A given high school may have several elementary districts that feed into it, yet some of those feeder districts may themselves feed into multiple high school districts.

=== Colleges and universities ===
Using the criterion established by the Carnegie Foundation for the Advancement of Teaching, there are eleven "National Universities" in the state.

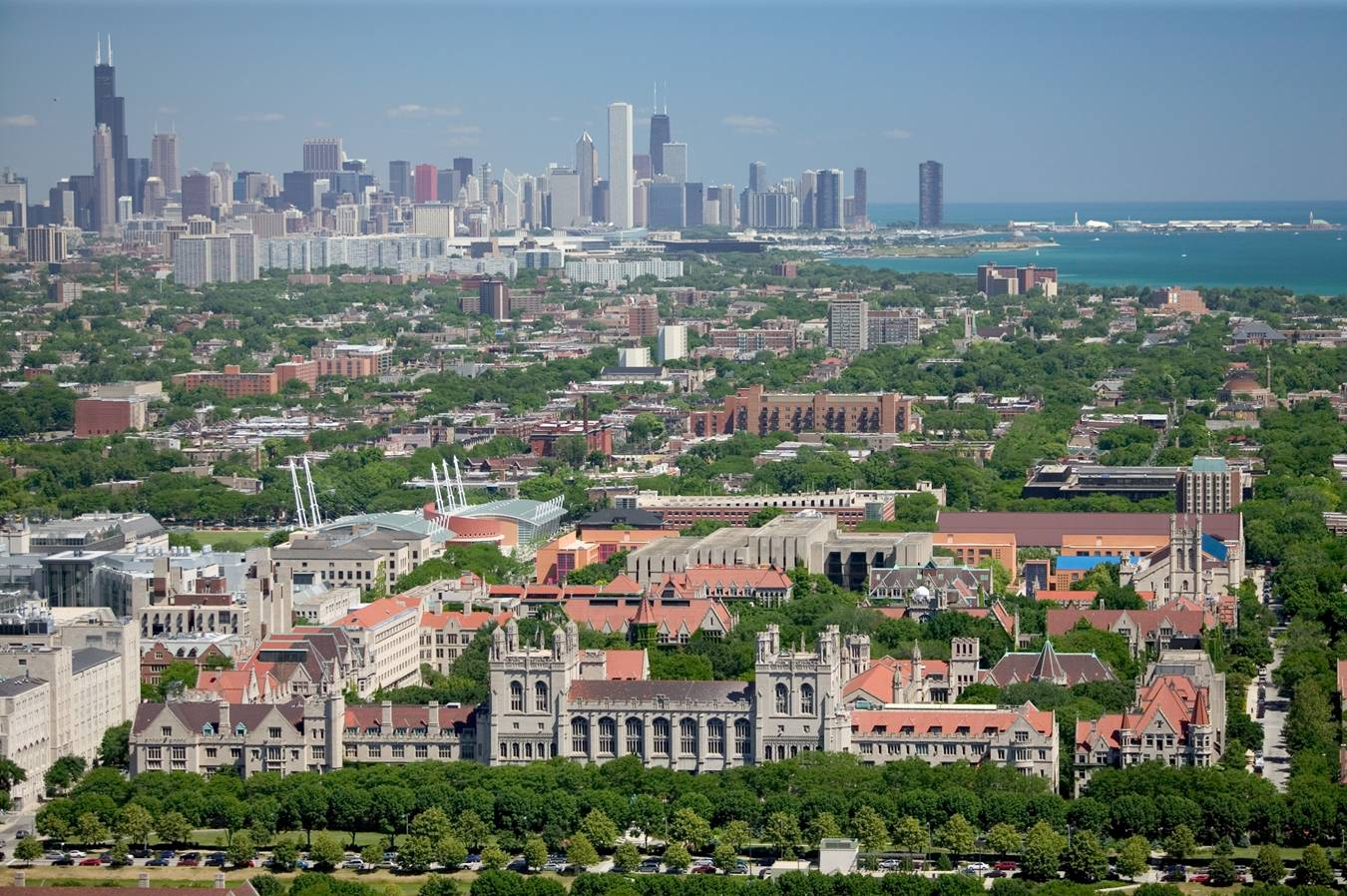
Campus of the University of Chicago

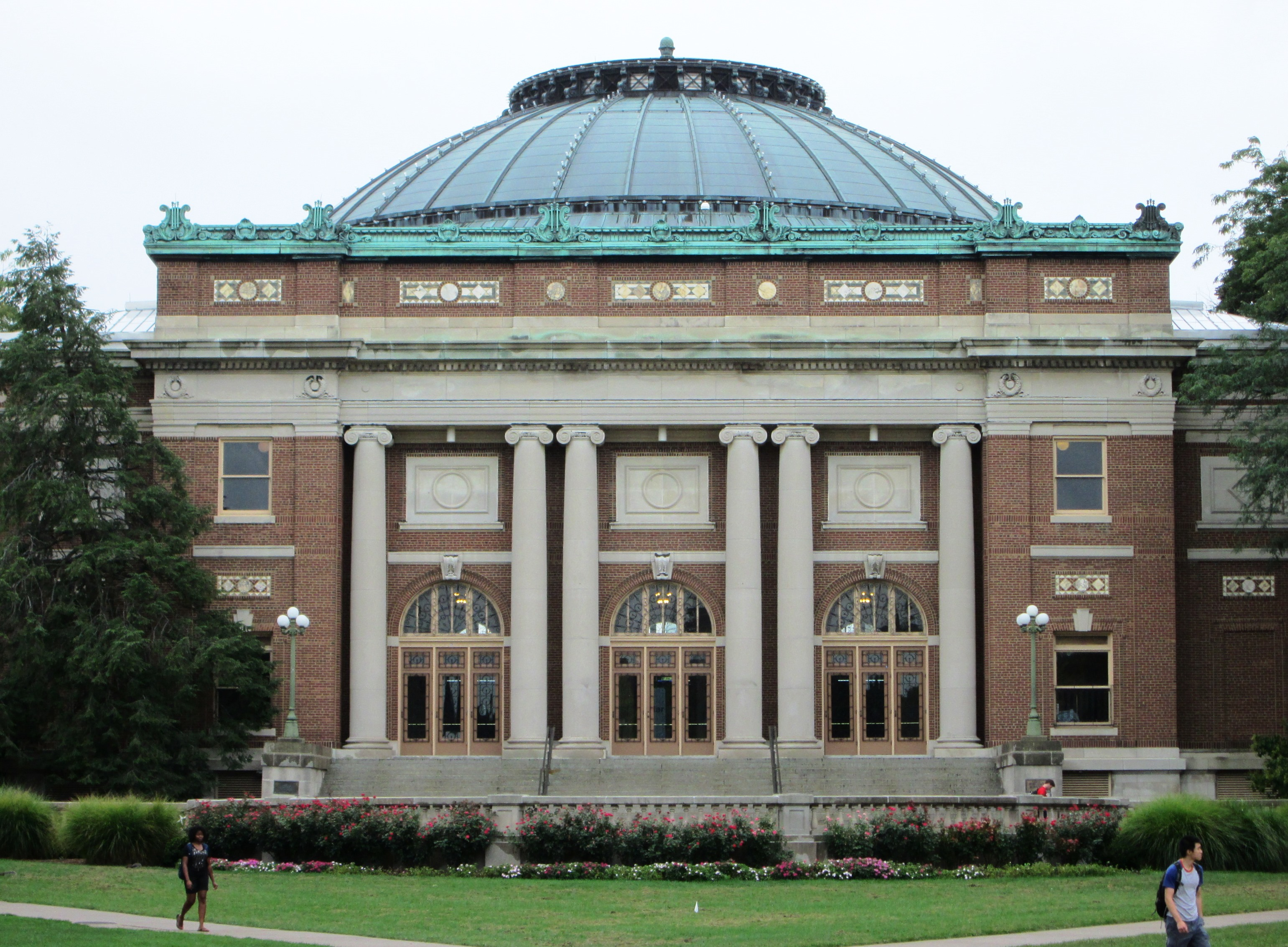
Foellinger Auditorium at the University of Illinois Urbana-Champaign

As of 19 August 2010, six of these rank in the "first tier" among the top 500 National Universities in the nation, as determined by the U.S. News & World Report rankings: the University of Chicago, Northwestern University, the University of Illinois Urbana-Champaign, Loyola University Chicago, the Illinois Institute of Technology, DePaul University, University of Illinois Chicago, Illinois State University, Southern Illinois University Carbondale, and Northern Illinois University. The University of Chicago is continuously ranked as one of the world's top ten universities on various independent university rankings, and its Booth School of Business, along with Northwestern's Kellogg School of Management consistently rank within the top five graduate business schools in the country and top ten globally. The University of Illinois Urbana-Champaign is often ranked among the best engineering schools in the world and United States.

Illinois also has more than twenty additional accredited four-year universities, both public and private, and dozens of small liberal arts colleges across the state. Additionally, Illinois supports 49 public community colleges in the Illinois Community College System.

=== School financing ===
Schools in Illinois are funded primarily by property taxes, based on state assessment of property values, rather than direct state contributions. Scholar Tracy Steffes has described Illinois public education as historically "inequitable", a system where one of "the wealthiest of states" is "the stingiest in its support for education". There have been several attempts to reform school funding in Illinois. The most notable attempt came in 1973 with the adoption of the Illinois Resource Equalizer Formula, a measure through which it was hoped funding could be collected and distributed to Illinois schools more equitably. However, opposition from affluent Illinois communities who objected to having to pay for the less well-off school districts (many of them Black majority communities, produced by redlining, white flight, and other "soft" segregation methods) resulted in the formula's abolition in the late 1980s.

=== Public libraries ===
In Illinois there are municipal public libraries (including those operated by cities, towns, townships, and villages), and there are libraries operated by special-purpose districts called library districts. As of 2026 state law allows the formation of county libraries, but as of that time there are none operating in the state.

== Transportation ==
Because of its central location and its proximity to the Rust Belt and Grain Belt, Illinois is a national crossroads for air, auto, rail, and truck traffic.

=== Airports ===
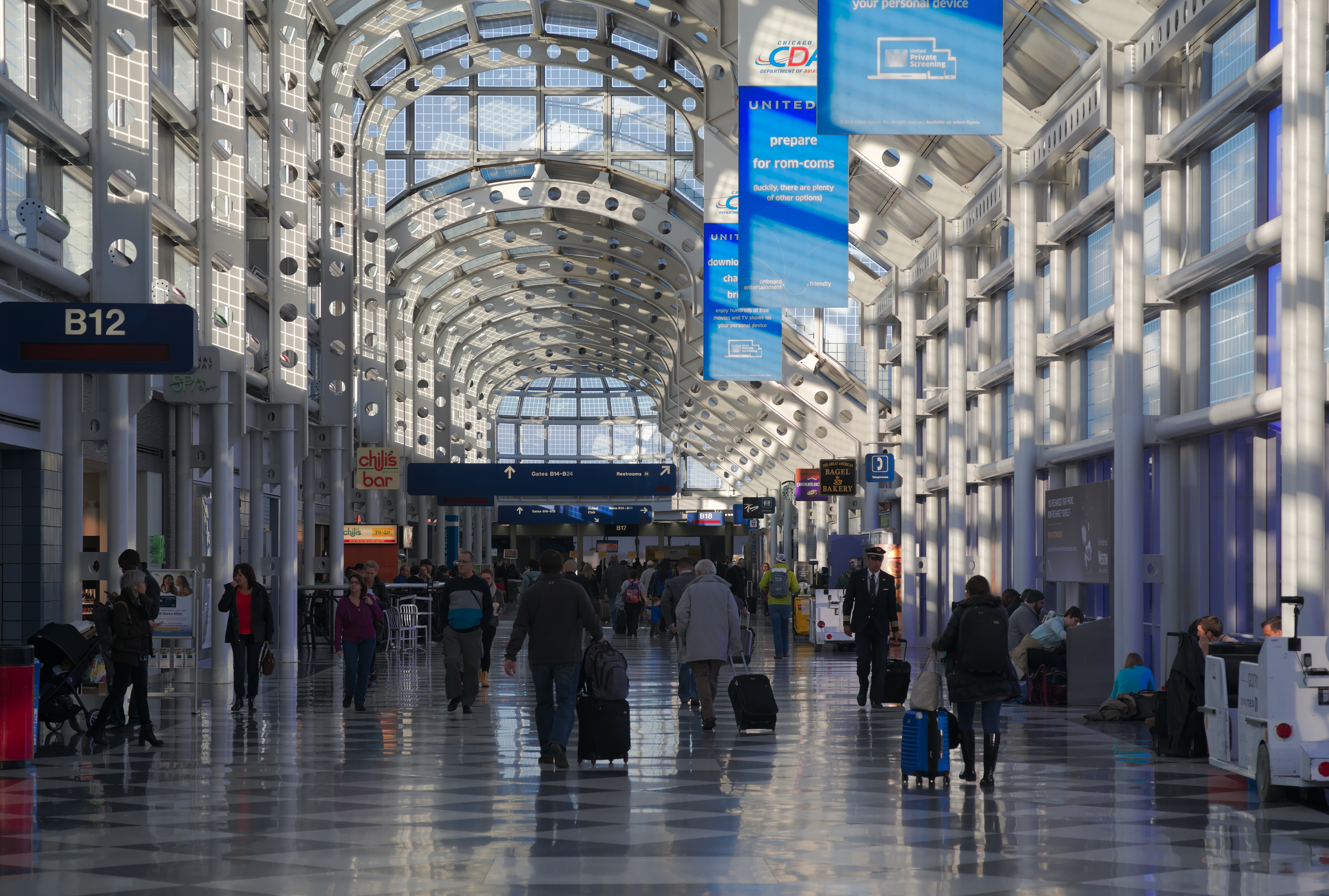
Concourse B inside O'Hare International Airport, one of the world's busiest airports

Chicago's O'Hare International Airport (ORD) is one of the busiest airports in the world, measured both in terms of total flights and passengers. It handled nearly 84.9 million passengers in 2025. It operates over 1,000 daily flights to 191 cities in the United States and 67 international destinations. It is a major hub for both United Airlines and American Airlines, and is undergoing a major $8.5 billion expansion project. United Airlines is headquartered in Chicago. Chicago's Midway International Airport (MDW) the secondary airport in the Chicago metropolitan area and also ranks as one of the nation's busiest airports. Midway is a major hub for Southwest Airlines. Both airports are owned and operated by the Chicago Department of Aviation.

Chicago/Rockford International Airport (RFD) is one of the fastest growing air-cargo hubs in the world and is the 15th-busiest cargo airport in the United States.

Other commercial airports in Illinois include Quad Cities International Airport (MLI) in Moline, General Wayne A. Downing International Airport (PIA) in Peoria, Central Illinois Regional Airport (BMI) in Bloomington, MidAmerica St. Louis Airport (BLV) in Belleville, University of Illinois Willard Airport (CMI) in Savoy (Champaign), and Abraham Lincoln Capital Airport (SPI) in Springfield. The state is home to over 107 public/private airports.

=== Highways ===
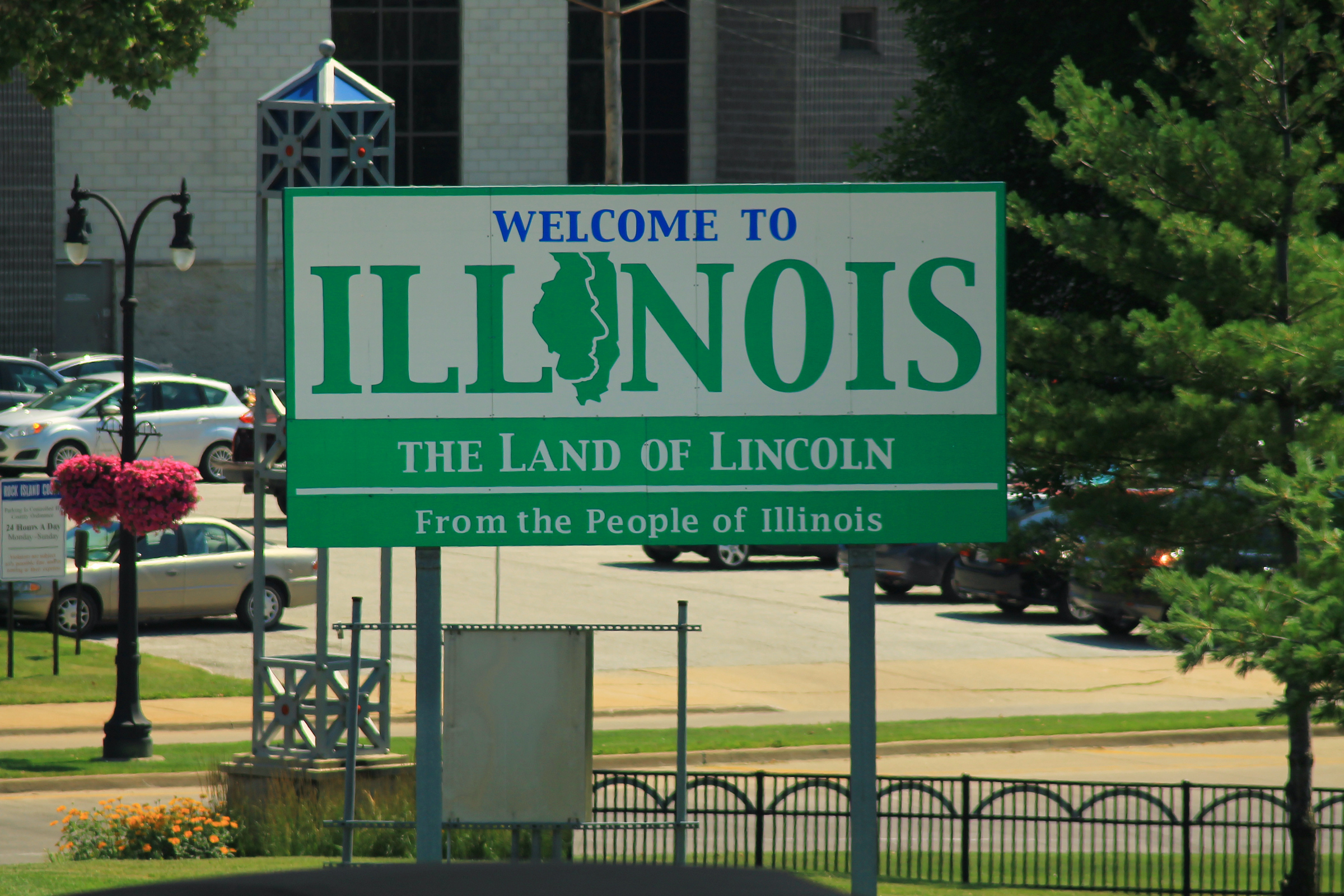
An Illinois welcome sign along U.S. Route 67 in Rock Island

The Interstate Highways in Illinois are all segments of the Interstate Highway System that are owned and maintained by the state. Major U.S. Interstate highways crossing the state include: Interstate 24 (I-24), I-39, I-41, I-55, I-57, I-64, I-70, I-72, I-74, I-80, I-88, I-90, and I-94.

Illinois has 13 primary (two-digit) interstates pass through it, more than any other state. Illinois also ranks third among the fifty states with the most interstate mileage, coming in after California and Texas, which are much bigger states in area.

Standard license plate introduced in 2017

The Illinois Department of Transportation (IDOT) is responsible for maintaining the U.S. Highways in Illinois. The system in Illinois consists of 21 primary highways. Among the U.S. highways that pass through the state, the primary ones are: US 6, US 12, US 14, US 20, US 24, US 30, US 34, US 36, US 40, US 41, US 45, US 50, US 51, US 52, US 54, US 60, US 62, and US 67.

The Illinois State Toll Highway Authority (more commonly known as the Illinois Tollway), operates five toll roads in the northern part of the state, with a sixth under construction. I-Pass is the Tollway's primary electronic transponder toll collection system. E-ZPass is also accepted. The Chicago Skyway is the only toll road in the state not operated by the Illinois Tollway, but instead by the Skyway Concession Company.

=== Buses ===
==== Public Transit ====
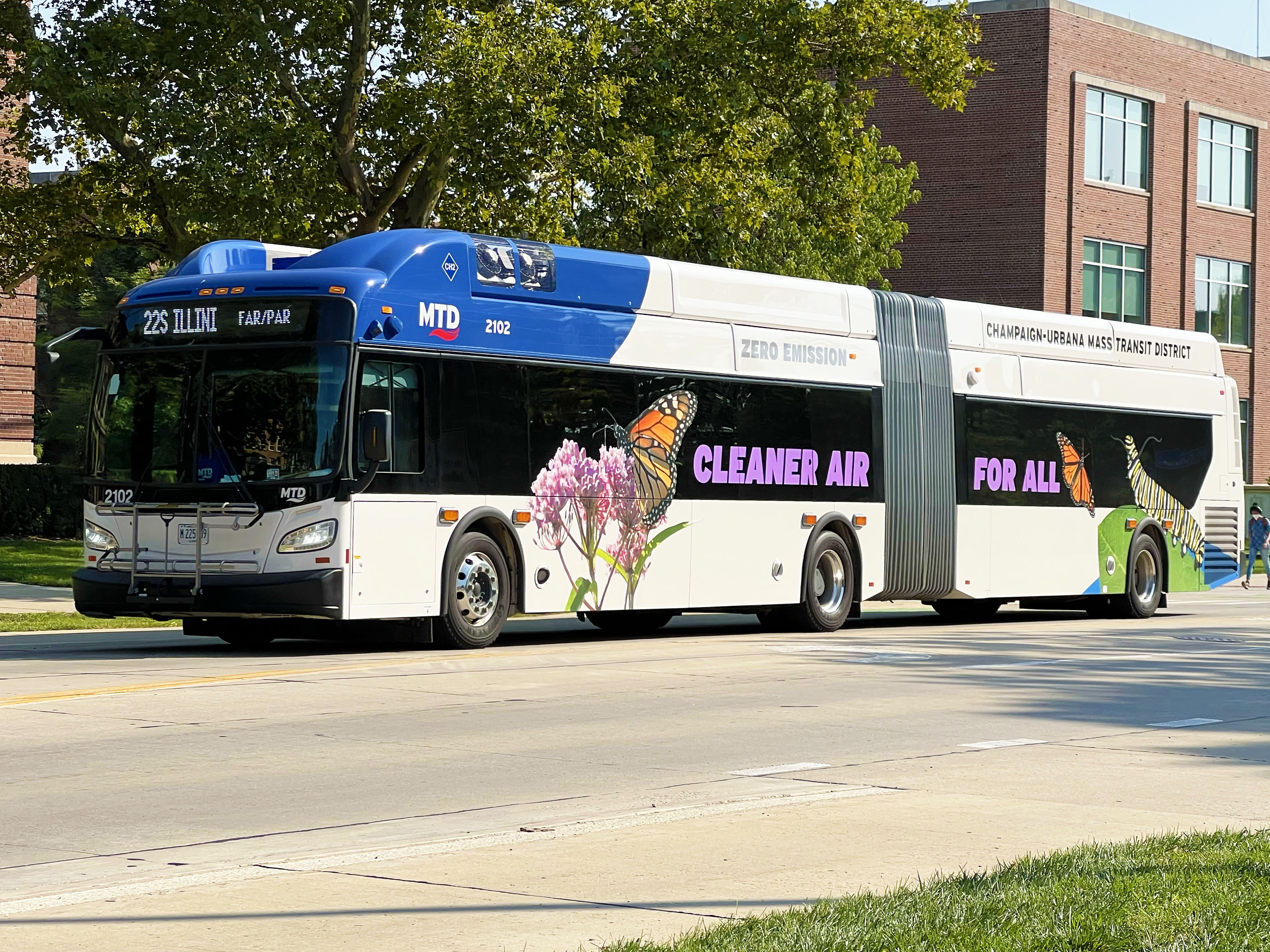
Hydrogen-powered MTD bus in Champaign–Urbana

Many urban areas in Illinois are served by public transit networks consisting of fixed bus route and demand-response services. In the Chicago area, under the oversight of the Northern Illinois Transit Authority (NITA), the Chicago Transit Authority (CTA) and Pace provide bus service in the City of Chicago, suburban Cook County, and the five collar counties of DuPage, Lake, Kane, Will, and McHenry. In June 2026, the RTA will be replaced by the Northern Illinois Transit Authority (NITA).

Major downstate transit systems include MTD in Champaign–Urbana, Connect Transit in Bloomington–Normal, CityLink in Peoria, RMTD in Rockford, MetroLINK in Moline, SMTD in Springfield, DeKalb Public Transit in DeKalb, River Valley Metro in Kankakee, and DPTS in Decatur. The Illinois Department of Transportation (IDOT) supports downstate transit agencies through the Downstate Operating Assistance Program (DOAP).

Rural areas of Illinois are served through demand-response services. Examples include C-CARTS in Champaign County, CountyLink in Peoria County, Connect GO in McLean County, RIM Rural Transit in Rock Island County, and SHOW BUS in Kankakee County.

==== Inter-City Services ====
Illinois sees numerous intercity bus services primarily connecting east and west. The Chicago Bus Station is the busiest intercity bus station in the state. The following carriers provide scheduled service: Amtrak Thruway, Barons Bus Lines, Burlington Trailways, Flixbus, Greyhound Lines, Indian Trails, Miller Transportation (Hoosier Ride), Peoria Charter Coach Company, Van Galder Bus Company, and Wisconsin Coach Lines.

Local transit map
Local Transit Systems (Only systems with fixed-route services are shown)

=== Railroads ===
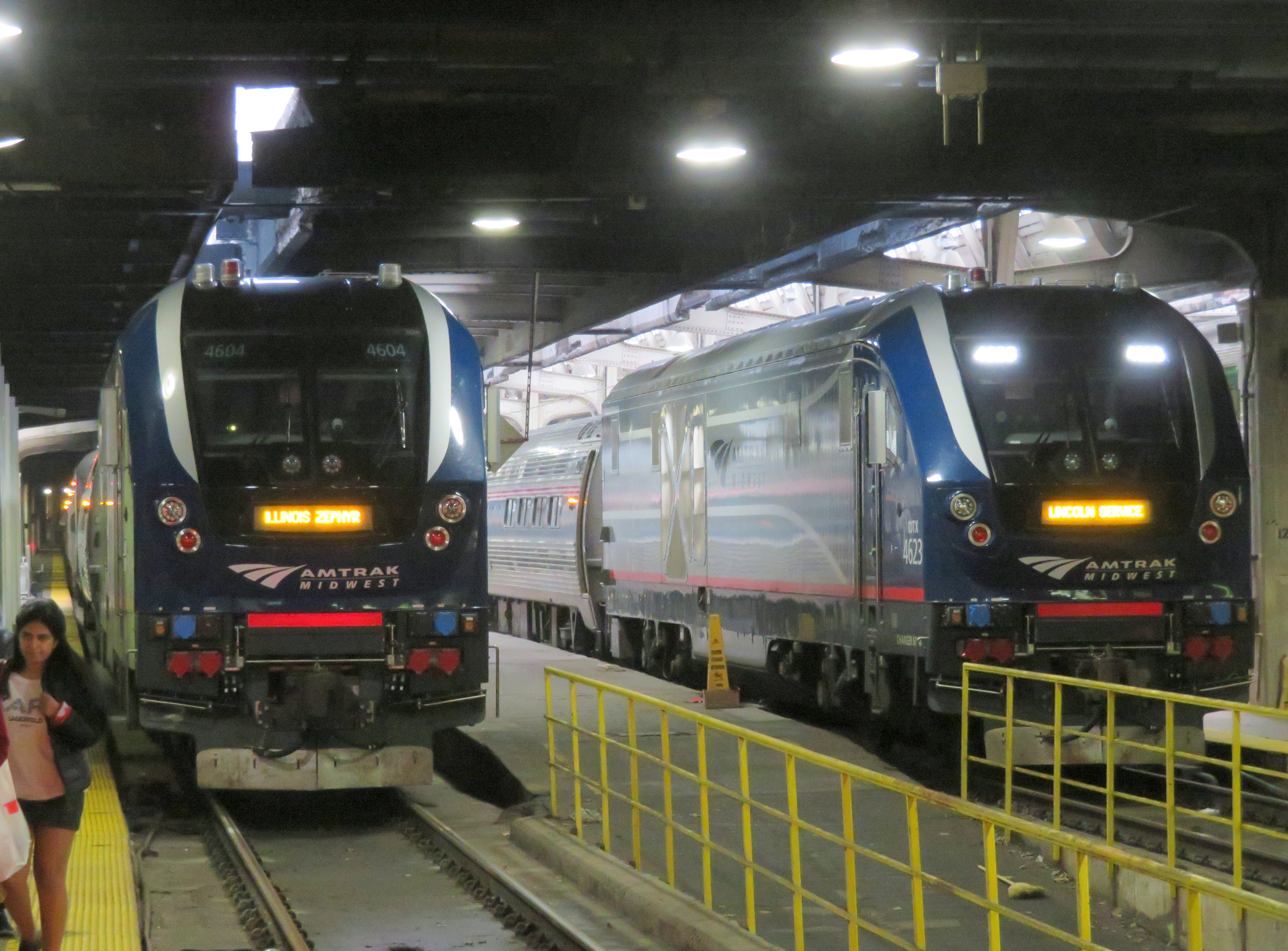
Two IDOT-owned Amtrak locomotives at Chicago Union Station

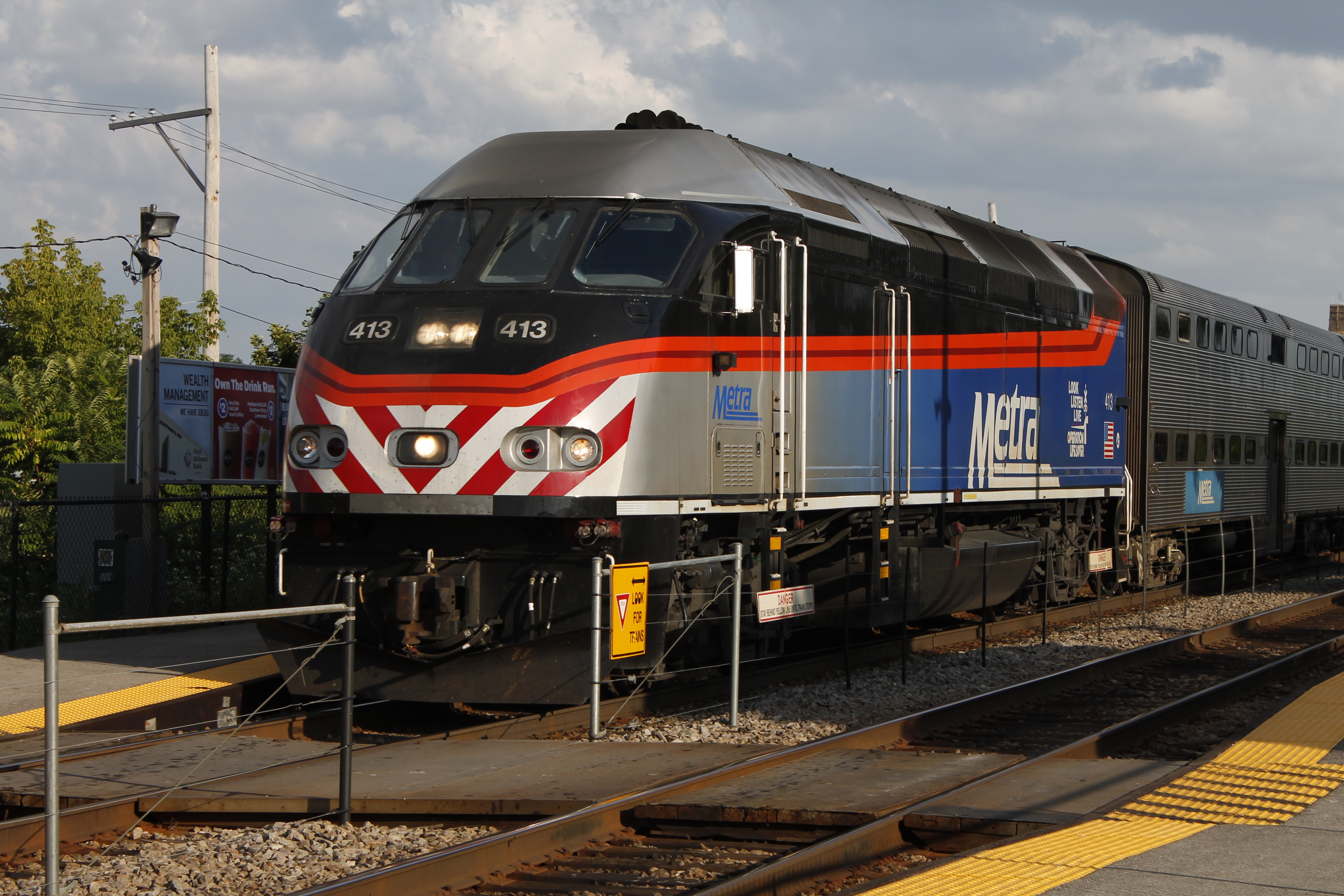
Metra commuter train in Chicago

Illinois has an extensive passenger and freight rail network.

==== Passenger rail ====
Chicago Union Station is the busiest rail station in the state, the fourth-busiest in the United States, and is a national hub for Amtrak. Long-distance services from the Eastern, Southern, and Western United States meet in Chicago. Amtrak operates the Illinois Service in partnership with the Illinois Department of Transportation (IDOT) featuring the Chicago to Carbondale Illini and Saluki, the Chicago to Quincy Carl Sandburg and Illinois Zephyr, and the Chicago to St. Louis Lincoln Service. The Lincoln Service is one of the few rail services outside the Northeastern United States with top speeds of up to 110 mph (180 km/h). Some of the state's busiest stations include Uptown Station in Bloomington–Normal and Illinois Terminal in Champaign–Urbana. Amtrak's Michigan Services are based in Chicago. Amtrak's Hiawatha and Borealis are operated as part of partnership between IDOT and the Wisconsin Department of Transportation.

Metra is one of the largest suburban commuter rail systems in the United States. Under the oversight of the Northern Illinois Transit Authority (NITA), it operates 11 commuter rail lines and 243 stations in Cook, DuPage, Lake, Kane, Will, and McHenry counties, with one line extending into Kenosha, Wisconsin. The South Shore Line commuter service originates in Chicago and connects the state to Northwest Indiana.

The Illinois Department of Transportation (IDOT) has programmed several new passenger rail routes to serve the state. These include the Chicago-Moline route (to be operated by Amtrak) and the Chicago-Rockford route (to be operated by Metra). A route between Chicago and Peoria was accepted into the Federal Railroad Administration's (FRA) Corridor Identification and Development Program and is undergoing studies.

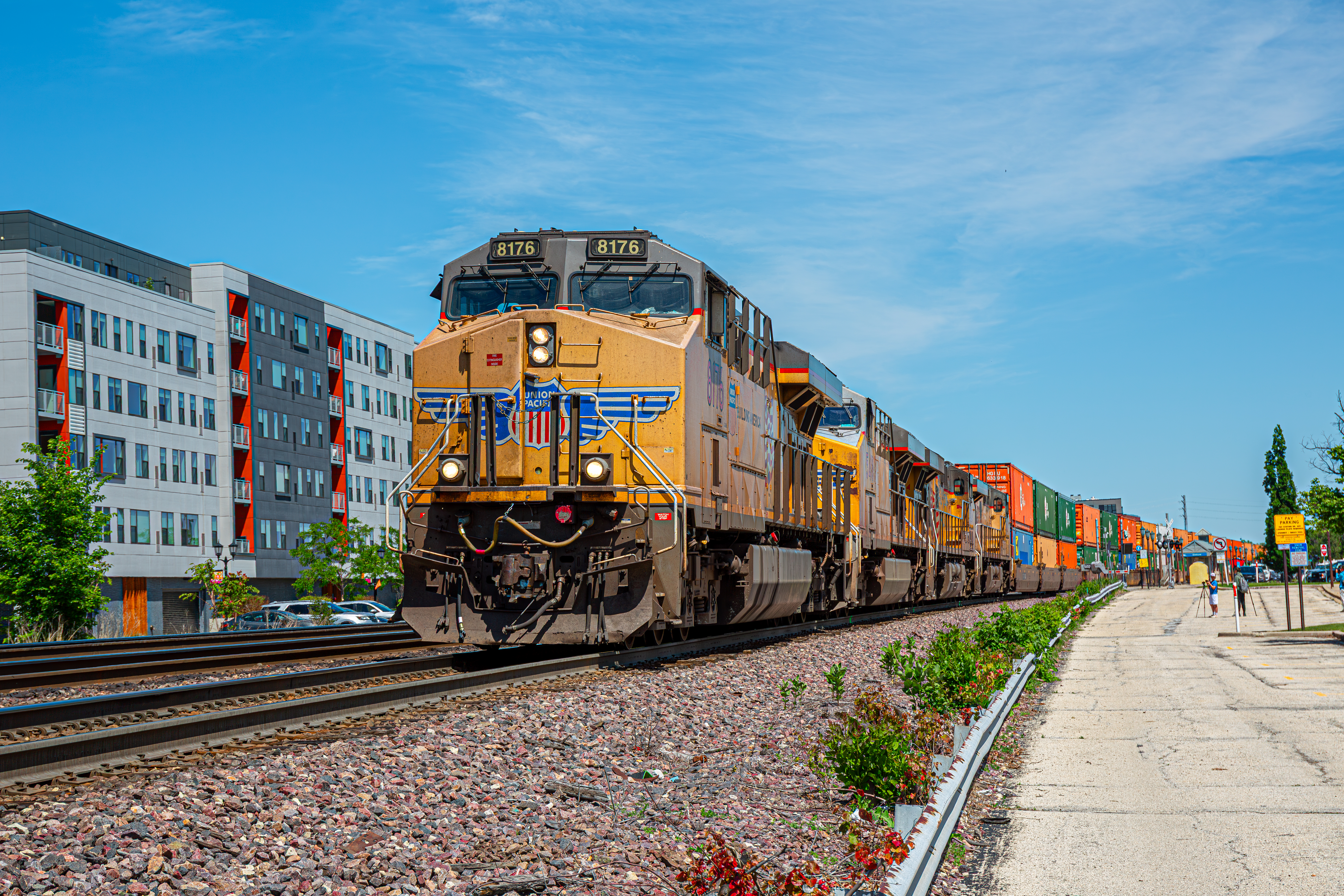
Union Pacific freight train in Elmhurst

==== Freight rail ====
All six Class I freight railroads meet in Chicago, making it the largest and most active rail hub in North America. About 25 percent of all freight trains and 50 percent of all intermodal trains in the United States passes through the Chicago area. As a result, there is heavy rail congestion in the Greater Chicago area and Chicago Region Environmental and Transportation Efficiency Program (CREATE) program was established to improve the efficiency of freight and passenger rail movements.

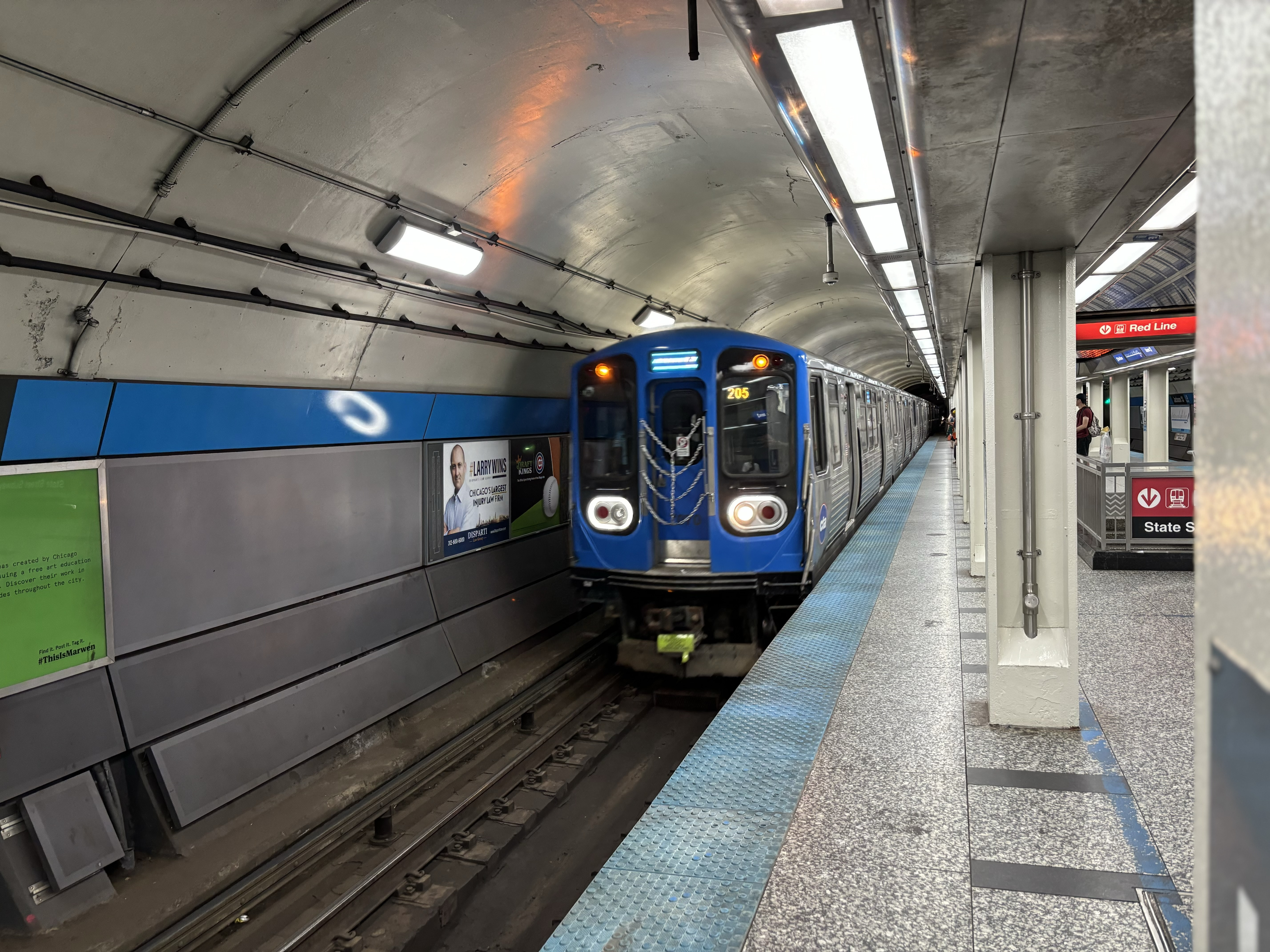
CTA Blue Line train in Chicago

==== Rapid transit and light rail ====
The Chicago Transit Authority (CTA) operates the Chicago "L" rapid transit system. With eight color-coded lines and 146 stations, it is the third-busiest rapid transit system in the United States. The Red and Blue Lines offer 24-hour service, one of the few rapid transit lines to do so in the world. The Blue and Orange Lines provide direct rail service to O'Hare and Midway Airports respectively. The Red Line is currently undergoing a $5 billion extension project.

The St. Louis MetroLink operates two light rail lines in the Metro-East region of Illinois.

=== Waterways ===
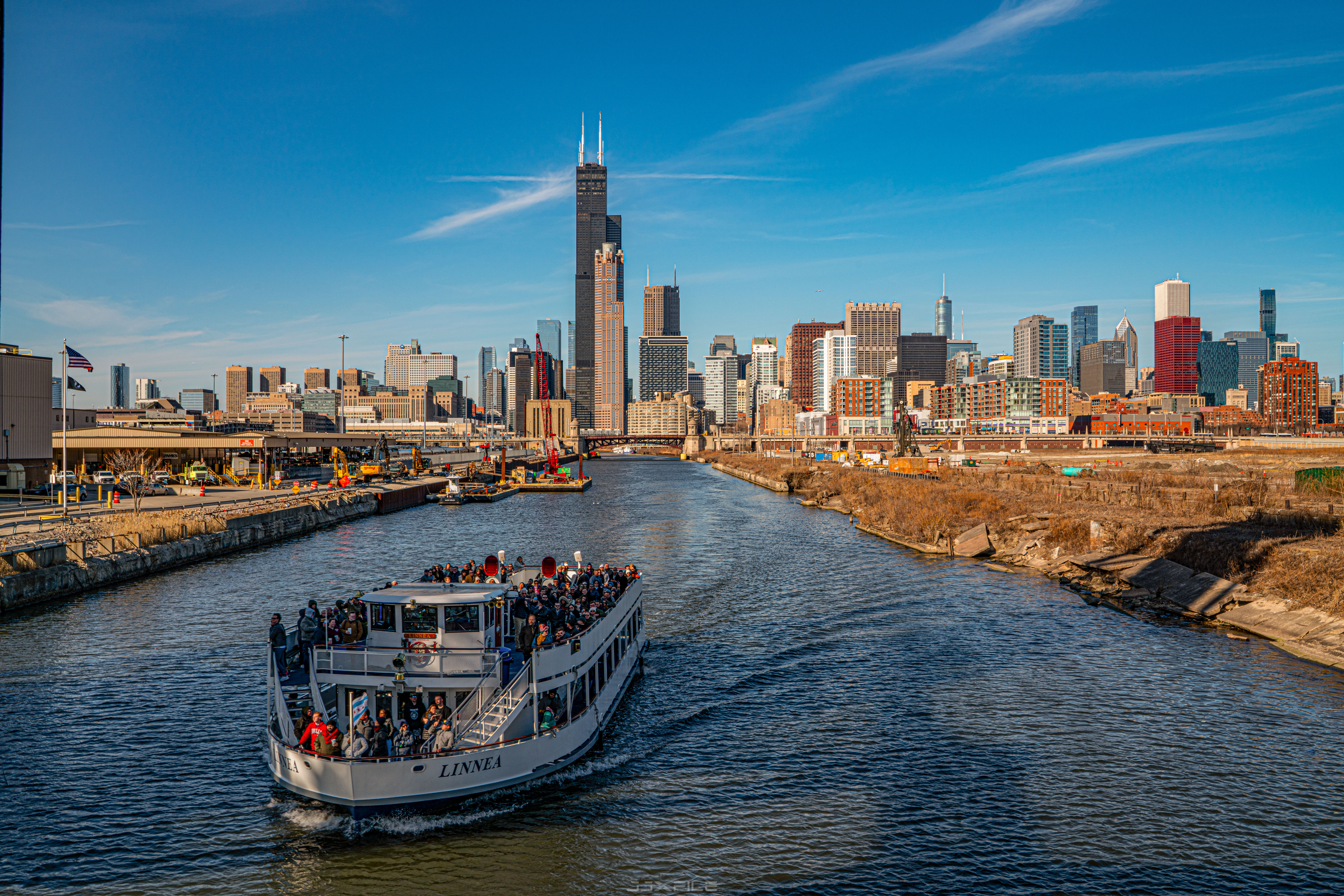
A boat on the South Branch of the Chicago River

Illinois is bordered by 880 miles of rivers, with the Mississippi River and Illinois River being among the largest. The Mississippi River provides access to the Gulf of Mexico. Other major rivers include the Ohio River, the Wabash River, the Kankakee River, the Kaskaskia River, the Rock River, and the Fox River.

The Chicago River hosts many tourist and commuter boat routes such as the Chicago River Architecture Tours and the Chicago Water Taxi.

Lake Michigan gives Illinois access to the Atlantic Ocean by way of the Saint Lawrence Seaway. Major harbors on Lake Michigan include Waukegan Harbor in Waukegan and North Point Marina in Winthrop Harbor. North Point Marina is the largest marina on the Great Lakes.

The Illinois International Port District operates the Port of Chicago, which is located on Lake Michigan at the mouth of the Calumet River. It is the start point of the Illinois Waterway, which is series of rivers that allow for commercial shipping between the Great Lakes and the Mississippi River. The Illinois Waterway also consists of the Chicago Sanitary and Ship Canal, which connects the Chicago River with the Des Plaines River and replaced the Illinois and Michigan Canal.

== See also ==
- Index of Illinois-related articles
- List of people from Illinois
- Outline of Illinois
- History of Illinois

== Notes ==
| Preceded by Mississippi | List of U.S. states by date of admission to the Union; Admitted on December 3, 1818 (21st) | Succeeded by Alabama |
