= List of United States political families (Y) =

The following is an alphabetical list of political families in the United States whose last name begins with Y.

== The Yates ==
- Richard Yates (1818–1873), Illinois State Representative 1842–45 1848–49, U.S. Representative from Illinois 1851–55, Governor of Illinois 1861–65, U.S. Senator from Illinois 1865–71. Father of Richard Yates.
  - Richard Yates (1860–1936), Attorney of Jacksonville, Illinois 1885–90, Judge of Marion County, Illinois 1894–97; Collector of Internal Revenue for Illinois 1897–1900; Governor of Illinois 1901–05; U.S. Representative from Illinois 1919–33. Son of Richard Yates.
  - Richard Yates Rowe (1888–1973), Illinois Republican Committeeman 1943, Chairman of the Illinois Republican Party 1944, Illinois Secretary of States 1944–45, Treasurer of Illinois 1947–49. Relative of Richard Yates and Richard Yates.
    - Harris Rowe (1923–2013), Member of the Illinois House of Representatives 1961–67. Son of Richard Yates Rowe.

== The Youngs and Browns ==
- William Singleton Young (1790–1827), U.S. Representative from Kentucky 1825–27. Brother of Bryan Young.
- Bryan Young (1800–1882), U.S. Representative from Kentucky 1845–47, Kentucky State Representative. Brother of William Singleton Young.
  - John Young Brown (1835–1904), U.S. Representative from Kentucky 1859–61 1873–77, Governor of Kentucky 1891–95, candidate for U.S. Representative from Kentucky 1896, candidate for Governor of Kentucky 1899. Nephew of William Singleton Young and Bryan Young.
