= List of United States political families (R) =

The following is an alphabetical list of political families in the United States whose last name begins with R.

== The Raines ==
- Thomas Raines (1842–1924), Treasurer of New York 1872–74 1874–75. Brother of George Raines and John Raines.
- George Raines (1846–1908), New York State Senator 1878–79, delegate to the Democratic National Convention. Brother of Thomas Raines and John Raines.
- John Raines (1840–1909), New York Assemblyman 1881–83 1885, New York State Senator 1886–89 1894–1909, President of the Canandaigua, New York Board of Education 1887–1909; delegate to the Republican National Convention 1888; U.S. Representative from New York 1889–93; acting Lieutenant Governor of New York 1906. Brother of Thomas Raines and George Raines.

== The Ramos and Vilellas ==
- Roberto Sanchez Vilella (1913–1997), Mayor of San Juan, Puerto Rico 1945–46; Governor of Puerto Rico 1965–69. Father of Robert Sanchez Ramos.
- Jeanette Ramos Buonomo, Judge in Puerto Rico. Mother of Roberto Sanchez Ramos.
  - Roberto Sanchez Ramos (born 1967), Solicitor General of Puerto Rico, Puerto Rico Secretary of Justice. Son of Roberto Sanchez Vilella and Jeanette Ramos Buonomo.

Additionally, the Ramos family of Manatí includes:

- Oreste Ramos Muñiz, former president of the Asociación de Agricultores (Farmers' Association) and his sons:
- Oreste Ramos Díaz (born 1946), senator for San Juan between 1977 and 1997
- Héctor R. Ramos Díaz, former secretary of DACO (Department of Consumer Affairs).

NOTE: Jeanette Ramos Buonomo's father, Ernesto Ramos Antoninni, was also a political figure in Puerto Rico.

== The Ramsays ==
- Nathaniel Ramsey (1741–1817), delegate to the Maryland Constitutional Convention 1775, Maryland House Delegate 1785, Delegate to the Continental Congress from Maryland 1786–87, U.S. Marshal of Maryland 1790–98. Brother of David Ramsay.
- David Ramsay (1749–1815), South Carolina State Representative 1776–83, Delegate to the Continental Congress from South Carolina 1782–83 1785–86. Brother of Nathaniel Ramsey.

== The Randalls ==
- Phineas Randall, Judge of the Court of Common Pleas in New York 1837–41. Father of Alexander Randall.
  - Alexander Randall (1819–1872), Postmaster of Waukesha, Wisconsin; Wisconsin Assemblyman; Governor of Wisconsin 1858–61; U.S. Minister to the Vatican, U.S. Postmaster General 1866–69. Son of Phineas Randall.
  - Edwin M. Randall (1822–1895), Chief Justice of the Florida Supreme Court 1869–85. Son of Phineas Randall.

== The Randolphs ==
See Randolph family of Virginia

== The Randolphs of New Jersey ==
- James F. Randolph (1791–1872), U.S. Collector of Internal Revenue 1815–46, Clerk of Court of Common Pleas in New Jersey, New Jersey Assemblyman 1823–24, U.S. Representative from New Jersey 1828–33. Father of Theodore Fitz Randolph.
  - Theodore Fitz Randolph (1826–1883), New Jersey Assemblyman 1859, New Jersey State Senator 1862–63, Governor of New Jersey 1869–72, U.S. Senator from New Jersey 1875–81. Son of James F. Randolph.

== The Rankins ==
- Jeannette Rankin (1880–1973), U.S. Representative from Montana 1917–19 1941–43, candidate for U.S. Senate from Montana 1918. Sister of Wellington D. Rankin.
- Wellington D. Rankin (1884–1966), Attorney General of Montana 1921–24, U.S. Attorney of Montana 1926–34, candidate for Governor of Montana 1928, candidate for U.S. Senate from Montana 1942. Brother of Jeannette Rankin.

== The Raskins ==
- Max Raskin (1902–1984), candidate for District Attorney of Milwaukee County, Wisconsin 1930; Milwaukee, Wisconsin City Attorney 1932–1936; Wisconsin Circuit Court Judge 1963–1973 1977–1980. Great-uncle of Jamie Raskin.
  - Jamie Raskin (born 1962), Maryland State Senator 2007–2016, U.S. Representative from Maryland 2017–present. Great-nephew of Max Raskin.
  - Sarah Bloom Raskin (born 1961), Governor of the Federal Reserve 2010–2014, U.S. Deputy Secretary of the Treasury. Wife of Jamie Raskin.

== The Rathbones and Harrises ==
- Ira Harris (1802–1875), member of the State Assembly 1844 to 1845, member of the New York Senate 1846, justice of the New York Supreme Court 1848 to 1861, senator from New York 1861 to 1867, father-in-law of H. Reed Rathbone.
  - Henry Reed Rathbone (1837–1911), consul to Hanover, Germany 1882 to 1883, son-in-law of Ira Harris.
    - Henry Riggs Rathbone (1870–1928), congressman from Illinois 1923 to 1928.

== The Ratliffs ==
- Bill Ratliff (born 1936), member of the Texas Senate 1989–2000; 2003–04; Texas lieutenant governor 2000–03; civil engineer and resident of Mount Pleasant, father of Bennett and Thomas Ratliff
  - Bennett Ratliff (born 1961), member of the Texas House of Representatives from District 115 in Dallas County 2013–15; member and vice-president of the Coppell Independent School District Board of Trustees 2003–1012, civil engineer and resident of Coppell, son of Bill Ratliff and brother of Thomas Ratliff
  - Thomas Ratliff (born 1967), member of the elected Texas State Board of Education, with service since 2011, son of Bill Ratliff and brother of Bennett Ratliff

== The Rawlings ==
- Roy Willard Rawlings (1883–1973), member (1923–1934) and speaker (1927–1933) of the Rhode Island House of Representatives
  - Lucy Rawlings Tootell (1911–2010), member of the Rhode Island House of Representatives from 1973 to 1977, daughter of Roy Willard Rawlings
  - Rob Roy Rawlings (1920–2001), member of the Rhode Island House of Representatives and Rhode Island Senate, son of Roy Willard Rawlings.

== The Rays ==
- James B. Ray (1794–1848), Indiana State Representative 1821–22, Indiana State Senator 1822–25, candidate for U.S. Representative from Indiana 1824 1831 1837, Governor of Indiana 1825–31. Brother of Martin M. Ray.
- Martin M. Ray (1795–1865), Indiana State Representative 1826–27 1834–36, candidate for Indiana State Senator 1848. Brother of James B. Ray.
  - Martin M. Ray (1823–1872), delegate to the Whig Party National Convention 1848, candidate for U.S. Representative from Indiana 1858, delegate to the Democratic National Convention 1860 1872, Indiana State Senator 1861–63. Nephew of James B. Ray and Martin M. Ray.

== The Reagans ==
- Ronald Reagan (1911–2004), Governor of California 1967–75, candidate for the Republican nomination for president, 1976, President of the United States 1981–89. Father of Maureen Reagan.
  - Maureen Reagan (1941–2001), member of the California World Trade Commission, chairwoman of the U.S. delegation of the United Nations Decade for Women Conference, co-chairwoman of the Republican National Committee, chairwoman of the Republican Women's Political Action League, Republican candidate for the U.S. Senate from California, 1982, Republican candidate for U.S. House of Representatives from California, 1992. Daughter of Ronald Reagan.

== The Reames and Tongues ==
- Thomas H. Tongue (1844–1903), Mayor of Hillsboro, Oregon 1882–83 1886–87; Oregon State Senator 1888–92; Chairman of the Oregon Republican Convention 1890 1894; delegate to the Republican National Convention 1892; U.S. Representative from Oregon 1897–1903. Father-in-law of Alfred E. Reames.
  - Alfred E. Reames (1870–1943), U.S. Senator from Oregon 1938. Son-in-law of Thomas H. Tongue.
    - Thomas Tongue (1912–1994), Justice of the Oregon Supreme Court 1969–82. Grandson of Thomas H. Tongue.

== The Reams ==
- Frazier Reams (1897–1971), delegate to the Democratic National Convention 1928 1932 1936 1940 1944 1948 1956, Prosecuting Attorney of Lucas County, Ohio 1933–37; candidate for Democratic nomination for Attorney General of Ohio 1936; candidate for Democratic nomination for Governor of Ohio 1944; U.S. Representative from Ohio 1951–55. Father of Frazier Reams Jr..
  - Frazier Reams Jr. (1929–2020), Ohio State Senator, candidate for Governor of Ohio 1966. Son of Frazier Reams.

== The Reeds ==
- Clyde M. Reed (1871–1949), Governor of Kansas 1929–31, U.S. Senator from Kansas 1939–49. Father of Clyde M. Reed Jr.
  - Clyde M. Reed Jr., delegate to the Republican National Convention 1948, candidate for Governor of Kansas 1958. Son of Clyde M. Reed.

== The Reeds of Pennsylvania ==
- Charles Manning Reed (1803–1871), Pennsylvania State Representative 1837–38, U.S. Representative from Pennsylvania 1843–45. Father of Charles M. Reed Jr.
  - Charles M. Reed Jr., Mayor of Erie, Pennsylvania 1872–73. Son of Charles Manning Reed.

== The Reeds of Pennsylvania (II) ==
- James Hay Reed (1853–1927), U.S. District Court Judge in Pennsylvania 1891–92. Father of David A. Reed.
  - David A. Reed (1880–1953), U.S. Senator from Pennsylvania 1922–35, delegate to the Republican National Convention 1924 1940. Son of James Hay Reed.

== The Reeds and Joys ==
- John Reed Sr. (1751–1831), U.S. Representative from Massachusetts 1795–1801. Father of John Reed Jr.
  - John Reed Jr. (1781–1860), U.S. Representative from Massachusetts 1813–17 1821–41, Lieutenant Governor of Massachusetts 1845–51. Son of John Reed Sr.
    - James F. Joy, delegate to the Republican National Convention 1880. Son-in-law of John Reed Jr.

== The Reeveses ==
- Albert Reeves (1873–1971), Missouri State Representative 1901–02, U.S. District Court Judge. Father of Albert L. Reeves Jr.
  - Albert L. Reeves Jr. (1906–1987), U.S. Representative from Missouri 1947–49. Son of Albert L. Reeves.

== The Reeveses and Robinsons of Louisiana ==
- Calvin Marion Robinson (1908–1957), sheriff of Winn Parish, Louisiana prior to 1956, committed suicide more than a year after election defeat, uncle of Terry Reeves.
  - Terry Reeves (1946–2005), district attorney of Winn Parish from 1991 to 2005, committed suicide in office, nephew of Calvin Marion Robinson

== The Reids ==
- Harry Reid (1939–2021), Nevada Assemblyman 1967–71, Lieutenant Governor of Nevada 1971–75, candidate for U.S. Senator from Nevada 1974, Chair of Nevada Gaming Commission 1977–1981, U.S. Representative from Nevada 1983–1987, U.S. Senator from Nevada 1987–2017. Father of Rory Reid.
  - Rory Reid (born 1963), Commissioner of Clark County, Nevada 2003–2011, Candidate for Governor of Nevada 2010. Son of Harry Reid.

== The Reids and Mills ==
- Whitelaw Reid (1837–1912) was an American politician who as a famous voice of the Republican Party, was honored with appointments as ambassador to France and Great Britain, as well as numerous other honorific positions. Reid was the party's nominee for Vice President of the United States in the 1892 election. In 1898, President William McKinley appointed him to the American commission that negotiated peace with Spain after the Spanish–American War
  - Ogden Mills Reid (1882–1947) was an American newspaper publisher who was president of the New York Herald Tribune and a voice in the Republican Party due to his power in the media world. The Herald Tribune's large readership was recognized as great factor for public opinion. Candidates of the Republican Party since the 1870s have benefitted from the Reid's help. Son of Whitelaw Reid.
  - Helen Rogers Reid (1882–1970) was an American newspaper publisher. She was president of the New York Herald Tribune. She was the wife of Ogden Mills Reid.
  - Ogden L. Mills (1884–1937) nephew of Whitelaw Reid, (August 23, 1884 – October 11, 1937) was the United States Secretary of the Treasury in President Herbert Hoover's cabinet. As a member of the Republican Party, Mills also represented New York in the United States House of Representatives, served as Undersecretary of the Treasury during the administration of President Calvin Coolidge, and was the Republican nominee in the 1926 New York gubernatorial election
    - Ogden Reid (1925–2019), grandson of Whitelaw Reid, (June 24, 1925 – March 2, 2019) was an American politician and diplomat. He was the U.S. ambassador to Israel and a six-term United States representative from New York.

== The Reids of Illinois ==
- Charlotte T. Reid (1913–2007), U.S. Representative from Illinois 1962–71. Mother of Patricia Reid Lindner.
  - Patricia Reid Lindner (born 1939), Illinois State Representative 1993–2009. Daughter of Charlotte T. Reid.

== The Reids and Settles ==
- Thomas Settle (1789–1857), member of the North Carolina House of Commons 1816, 1826–29, U.S. Representative from North Carolina 1817–21, Judge of the North Carolina Superior Court 1832–57. Father of Thomas Settle.
  - Thomas Settle (1831–1888), member of the North Carolina House of Commons 1858–59, North Carolina State Senator 1865–66, Justice of the North Carolina Supreme Court, U.S. Minister to Peru 1871, delegate to the Republican National Convention 1872, candidate for Governor of North Carolina 1876. Son of Thomas Settle.
  - David Settle Reid (1813–1891), North Carolina State Senator 1835–42, U.S. Representative from North Carolina 1843–47, Governor of North Carolina 1851–54, U.S. Senator from North Carolina 1854–59. Nephew of Thomas Settle.
    - Thomas Settle III (1865–1919), Solicitor in North Carolina 1886–94, U.S. Representative from North Carolina 1893–97, candidate for Governor of North Carolina 1912. Son of Thomas Settle.

NOTE: Thomas Settle was also first cousin by marriage of U.S. Representatives John Kerr and Bartlett Yancey.

== The Remmels ==
- Harmon L. Remmel (1852–1927), candidate for U.S. Representative from Arkansas 1884, Arkansas State Representative 1886, delegate to the Republican National Convention 1892 1908 1920 1924, candidate for Governor of Arkansas 1892 1896 1900, Chairman of the Arkansas Republican Party 1900–25, Republican National Committeeman 1912–20 1924, candidate for U.S. Senate from Arkansas 1916. Uncle of A.C. Remmel.
  - A.C. Remmel (1882–1920), candidate for U.S. Representative from Arkansas 1910 1912, delegate to the Republican National Convention 1920. Nephew of H.L. Remmel.
  - Ellen Cates Remmel (1888–1961), Republican National Committeewoman 1928–57, delegate to the Republican National Convention 1932 1936 1948 1956. Wife of A.C. Remmel.
    - Pratt C. Remmel (1915–1991), delegate to the Republican National Convention 1952 1956, Mayor of Little Rock, Arkansas 1952–55; candidate for Governor of Arkansas 1954. Son of A.C. Remmel and Ellen Cates Remmel.

== The Rendells ==
- Ed Rendell (born 1944), District Attorney of Philadelphia 1978–86, Mayor of Philadelphia 1992–99, General Chair of the Democratic National Committee 1999–2001, Governor of Pennsylvania 2003–11.
- Midge Rendell (born 1947), Judge of the United States District Court for the Eastern District of Pennsylvania 1994–97, Judge of the United States Court of Appeals for the Third Circuit 1997–2015. Former wife of Ed Rendell.

== The Revercombs ==
- George A. Revercomb, Virginia State Senator. Father of Chapman Revercomb.
  - Chapman Revercomb (1895–1979), U.S. Senator from West Virginia 1943–49 1956–59, candidate for U.S. Senate from West Virginia 1952, candidate for Republican nomination for Governor of West Virginia 1960. Son of George A. Revercomb.
  - Sara Revercomb, West Virginia Republican Executive Committeewoman 1967. Wife of Chapman Revercomb.
    - George Hughes Revercomb (1929–1993), District of Columbia Superior Court Judge 1970–85, Judge of the U.S. District Court for the District of Columbia 1985–93. Son of Chapman Revercomb and Sara Revercomb.

== The Reyburns ==
- John E. Reyburn (1845–1914), Pennsylvania State Representative 1871 1874–76, Pennsylvania State Senator 1876–92, U.S. Representative from Pennsylvania 1890–97 1906–07, Mayor of Philadelphia, Pennsylvania 1907–11. Father of William S. Reyburn.
  - William S. Reyburn (1882–1946), Pennsylvania State Representative 1909–11, U.S. Representative from Pennsylvania 1911–13. Son of John E. Reyburn.

== The Reynolds ==
- John Reynolds (1788–1865), Justice of the Illinois Supreme Court 1818–25, candidate for U.S. Senate from Illinois 1823, Illinois State Representative 1827–29 1846 1852, Governor of Illinois 1830–34, U.S. Representative from Illinois 1834–37 1839–43, candidate for Illinois State Senate 1848. Brother of Thomas Reynolds.
- Thomas Reynolds (1796–1844), Governor of Missouri 1840–44. Brother of John Reynolds.

== The Reynolds of Wisconsin ==
- John W. Reynolds Sr. (1876–1958), District Attorney of Brown County, Wisconsin 1906–10; delegate to the Republican National Convention 1924; Attorney General of Wisconsin 1927–33. Father of John W. Reynolds Jr.
  - John W. Reynolds Jr. (1921–2002), Attorney General of Wisconsin 1959–63, Governor of Wisconsin 1963–65, candidate for the Democratic nomination for President of the United States 1964, U.S. District Court Judge in Wisconsin 1965–71, U.S. District Court Chief Judge in Wisconsin 1971–2002. Son of John W. Reynolds Sr.

== The Rhodes ==
- John Jacob Rhodes (1916–2003), candidate for Arizona Attorney General 1950, delegate to the Republican National Convention 1952 1954 1968, U.S. Representative from Arizona 1953–83. Father of John Jacob Rhodes III.
  - John Jacob Rhodes III (1943–2011), U.S. Representative from Arizona 1987–93. Son of John Jacob Rhodes.

== The Rices ==
- Henry Mower Rice (1816–1894), U.S. congressional delegate from Minnesota Territory 1853–57, U.S. Senator from Minnesota 1858–63. Brother of Edmund Rice.
- Edmund Rice (1819–1889), Minnesota State Senator 1864–66 1874–76, Minnesota State Representative 1867 1872 1877–78, U.S. Representative from Minnesota 1887–89. Brother of Henry Mower Rice.

== The Riches ==
- Charles Rich (1771–1824), Vermont State Representative 1800–11, Addison County, Vermont Judge; U.S. Representative from Vermont 1813–15 1817–24. Grandfather of John T. Rich.
  - John T. Rich (1841–1926), Michigan State Representative 1873–80, Michigan State Senator 1881, U.S. Representative from Michigan 1881–83, Governor of Michigan 1893–96, U.S. Collector of Customs of Detroit, Michigan 1898–1906; Treasurer of Michigan 1908. Grandson of Charles Rich.

== The Richards ==
- John Richards (1753–1822), Justice of the Peace of Philadelphia County, Pennsylvania 1777–1822; Judge of the Court of Common Pleas of Montgomery County, Pennsylvania 1784; U.S. Representative from Pennsylvania 1795–97; Pennsylvania State Senator 1801–07. Brother of Matthias Richards.
- Matthias Richards (1758–1830), Pennsylvania State Representative 1804–05, U.S. Representative from Pennsylvania 1807–11. Brother of John Richards.

== The Richardsons ==
- William M. Richardson (1774–1838), U.S. Representative from Massachusetts 1811–14, U.S. Attorney in Massachusetts, Chief Justice of New Hampshire 1816–38. Uncle of William Adams Richardson.
  - William Adams Richardson (1821–1896), U.S. Secretary of the Treasury 1873–74, Chief Justice of the U.S. Court of Claims of Massachusetts 1874–96. Nephew of William M. Richardson.

== The Riegles ==
- Donald W. Riegle, Mayor of Flint, Michigan 1952–54. Father of Donald W. Riegle Jr.
  - Donald W. Riegle Jr. (born 1938), U.S. Representative from Michigan 1967–76, U.S. Senator from Michigan 1976–95, delegate to the Democratic National Convention 1984 1996 2000. Son of Donald W. Riegle.

== The Rileys ==
- John J. Riley (1895–1962), U.S. Representative from South Carolina 1945–49 1951–62.
- Corinne Boyd Riley (1893–1979), U.S. Representative from South Carolina 1962–63. Wife of John J. Riley.

== The Ringles ==
- Bartholomew Ringle (1814–1881), member of the Wisconsin State Assembly 1864, 1872, 1875–77.
  - John Ringle (1848–1923), member of the Wisconsin State Assembly 1879, 1894–98. Wisconsin Senate 1882–86. Son of Bartholomew Ringle.
    - Oscar Ringle (1878–1945), member of the Wisconsin State Assembly 1913. Son of John Ringle.

== The Ripleys ==
- Eleazar Wheelock Ripley (1782–1839), Massachusetts State Representative 1807, Massachusetts State Senator, Louisiana State Senator, U.S. Representative from Louisiana 1835–39. Brother of James W. Ripley.
- James W. Ripley (1786–1835), member of the Maine Legislature, U.S. Representative from Maine 1826–30. Brother of Eleazar Wheelock Ripley.

== The Ritchies ==
- James M. Ritchie (1829–1918), delegate to the Republican National Convention 1880, U.S. Representative from Ohio 1881–83. Father of Byron F. Ritchie.
  - Byron F. Ritchie (1853–1928), U.S. Representative from Ohio 1893–95, Common Pleas Court Judge in Ohio 1914–28. Son of James M. Ritchie.

== The Ritchies of Maryland ==
- Albert Ritchie, delegate to the Maryland Constitutional Convention 1867. Father of Albert Ritchie.
  - Albert Ritchie (1876–1936), Attorney General of Maryland 1915–19, delegate to the Democratic National Convention 1916 1924 1928, Governor of Maryland 1920–35, candidate for Democratic nomination for President of the United States 1924 1932. Son of Albert Ritchie.

== The Ritters and Evans ==
- Burwell C. Ritter (1810–1880), U.S. Representative from Kentucky 1865–67.
  - Walter Evans (1842–1923), Kentucky State Representative 1871–73, Kentucky State Senator 1873–75, Commissioner of Internal Revenue 1883–85, U.S. Representative from Kentucky 1895–99, Judge of the United States District Court for the District of Kentucky 1899–1901, Judge of the United States District Court for the Western District of Kentucky 1901–23. Nephew of Burwell C. Ritter.

== The Rives ==
- William Cabell Rives (1793–1868), delegate to the Virginia Constitutional Convention 1816, Virginia House Delegate 1817–20 1822–23, U.S. Representative from Virginia 1823–29, U.S. Senator from Virginia 1832–34 1836–39 1841–45, Delegate to the Confederate States Provisional Congress 1861–62, Confederate States Representative from Virginia 1862–65. Brother of Alexander Rives.
- Alexander Rives (1806–1885), Judge of the Virginia Supreme Court of Appeals 1866–69, Judge of U.S. District Court in Virginia 1871–82. Brother of William Cabell Rives.

== The Rivers ==
- David Foote Rivers (1859–1941), member of the Tennessee House of Representatives 1883–84. Father of Francis E. Rivers.
  - Francis E. Rivers (died 1975), member of the New York State Assembly 1930. son of David Foote Rivers.

== The Roanes ==
- John Roane (1766–1838), Virginia House Delegate 1788–90 1792, delegate to the Virginia Constitutional Convention 1788, U.S. Representative from Virginia 1809–15 1827–31 1835–37. Father of John J. Roane.
  - John J. Roane (1794–1869), Virginia House Delegate 1820–23, U.S. Representative from Virginia 1831–33. Son of John Roane.

== The Robbs ==
- Charles Henry Robb (1867–1939), Associate Justice of the United States Court of Appeals for the District of Columbia 1906–37.
  - Roger Robb (1907–1985), Judge of the United States Court of Appeals for the District of Columbia Circuit 1969–82. Son of Charles Henry Robb.

== The Roberts ==
- C. Wesley Roberts (1902–1976), Chairman of the Republican National Committee 1953. Father of Charles P. Roberts.
  - Charles P. Roberts (born 1936), U.S. Representative from Kansas 1981–97, U.S. Senator from Kansas 1997–2021. Son of C. Wesley Roberts.

== The Roberts of Oregon ==
- Frank L. Roberts (1915–1993), Oregon State Representative 1967–71, Oregon State Senator 1975–93.
- Betty Roberts (1923–2011), Oregon State Representative 1965–69, Oregon State Senator 1969–77, Judge, Oregon Court of Appeals 1977–82 Associate Justice of the Oregon Supreme Court 1982–86, candidate for United States Senator from Oregon 1974. Second wife of Frank L. Roberts.
- Barbara Roberts (born 1936), Oregon State Representative 1981–85, Secretary of State of Oregon 1985–91, Governor of Oregon 1991–95. Third wife of Frank L. Roberts.
- Keith Skelton (1918–1994), Oregon State Representative 1957–73. Third husband of Betty Roberts.
  - Mary Wendy Roberts (born 1944), Oregon State Representative 1973–75, Oregon State Senator 1975–79, Oregon Commissioner of Labor, 1979–95, Candidate for Oregon Secretary of State 1992. Daughter of Frank Roberts.
  - Richard Bullock (born 1951), Oregon State Senator 1979–82. Ex-husband of Mary Wendy Roberts.
  - Leslie Roberts (born 1947), Multnomah County circuit court judge 2007–present. Daughter of Frank Roberts.
  - Rex Armstrong, Oregon Court of Appeals Judge 1995–present. Husband of Leslie Roberts.

== The Robertsons ==
- Edward White Robertson (1823–1887), Louisiana State Representative 1847–49 1853, U.S. Representative from Louisiana 1877–83 1887. Father of Samuel Matthews Robertson.
  - Samuel Matthews Robertson (1852–1911), Louisiana State Representative 1879, U.S. Representative from Louisiana 1887–1907. Son of Edward White Robertson.

== The Robertsons of Louisiana and Virginia ==
- John Robertson (1787–1873), Attorney General of Virginia, U.S. Representative from Virginia 1834–39, Judge of the Henrico County, Virginia Circuit Court of Chancery; Virginia State Senator 1861–63. Brother of Thomas B. Robertson and Wyndham Robertson.
- Thomas B. Robertson (1779–1828), Secretary of the Territory of Orleans 1807–11, U.S. Representative from Virginia 1812–18, Governor of Virginia 1820–24, Judge of U.S. District Court of Louisiana 1825. Brother of John Robertson and Wyndham Robertson.
- Wyndham Robertson (1803–1888), Governor of Virginia 1836–37. Brother of John Robertson and Thomas B. Robertson.

== The Robertsons of Virginia ==
- A. Willis Robertson (1887–1971), Virginia State Senator 1916–22, U.S. Representative from Virginia 1933–46, U.S. Senator from Virginia 1946–67, delegate to the Democratic National Convention 1948 1952. Father of Marion G. Robertson.
  - Marion G. Robertson (1930–2023), candidate for the Republican nomination for President of the United States 1988. Son of A. Willis Robertson.

== The Robertsons and Eastaughs ==
- Ralph Elliott Robertson (1885–1961), Mayor of Juneau, Alaska 1920–23, delegate to Alaska's Constitutional Convention 1955–56, candidate for U.S. Senator from Alaska 1958. Father-in-law of Frederick Eastaugh.
  - Frederick Orlebar Eastaugh (1913–1992), Vice Consul for Norway in Alaska 1951–86, Vice Consul for France in Alaska 1953–85, Alaska Territory Representative 1953–55. Son-in-law of R. E. Robertson. Father of Robert Eastaugh.
    - Robert Ladd Eastaugh (born 1943), Associate Justice of Alaska Supreme Court 1994–2009. Son of Frederick Eastaugh.

== The Robinsons ==
- Samuel Robinson (1738–1813), Member of Vermont's Board of War during the American revolution; Justice of the Peace; Judge of southern Bennington County; Member of the Vermont House of Representatives (1779–1780); Speaker of the House (1780). Brother of Moses and Jonathan Robinson.
- Moses Robinson (1741–1813), member of the Vermont Council of Safety, Vermont Governor's Councilman 1778–85, Chief Justice of Vermont, Governor of Vermont 1789–90, U.S. Senator from Vermont 1791–95 1795–96, Vermont State Representative 1802. Brother of Samuel and Jonathan Robinson.
  - Moses Robinson Jr. (1763–1825), member of the Vermont Governor's Council, 1814–1815, member of the Vermont House of Representatives. Son of Moses Robinson.
  - Aaron Robinson (1767–1850), Town Clerk of Bennington; Justice of the Peace; Member of the Vermont House of Representatives (1816–17); Bennington County Judge of Probate (1835–36). Son of Moses Robinson.
  - Nathan Robinson (1772–1812), Member of the Vermont House of Representatives. Son of Moses Robinson.
    - John S. Robinson (1804–1860), Governor of Vermont 1853–54, delegate to the Democratic National Convention 1860. Grandson of Moses Robinson.
- Jonathan Robinson (1756–1819), Clerk of Bennington, Vermont 1795–1801; Vermont State Representative 1789–1802 1818; Judge of Vermont Probate Court 1795–98 1815–19; Chief Justice of the Vermont Supreme Court 1801–07; U.S. Senator from Vermont 1807–15. Brother of Samuel and Moses Robinson.

== The Robsions ==
- John M. Robsion (1873–1948), delegate to the Republican National Convention 1916 1928 1940 1944, U.S. Representative from Kentucky 1919–30 1935–48, U.S. Senator from Kentucky 1930. Father of John M. Robsion.
  - John M. Robsion Jr. (1904–1990), Kentucky Circuit Court Judge 1946–52, U.S. Representative from Kentucky 1953–59, delegate to the Republican National Convention 1956 1960, candidate for Governor of Kentucky 1959. Son of John M. Robsion Jr.

== The Rockefellers and Aldriches ==
See Rockefeller-Aldrich family political line

== The Rockwells ==
- Julius Rockwell (1805–1888), Massachusetts State Representative 1834–38 1858, U.S. Representative from Massachusetts 1843–51, delegate to the Massachusetts Constitutional Convention 1853, U.S. Senator from Massachusetts 1854–55, Judge of the Massachusetts Superior Court 1859–86. Father of Francis W. Rockwell.
  - Francis W. Rockwell (1844–1929), Justice in Massachusetts 1873–75, Massachusetts State Representative 1879, Massachusetts State Senator 1881–82, U.S. Representative from Massachusetts 1884–91, delegate to the Republican National Convention 1900. Son of Julius Rockwell.

== The Rodgers ==
- David Rodgers, Mayor of Spokane, Washington 1967–77. Father-in-law of Cathy McMorris Rodgers.
  - Cathy McMorris Rodgers (born 1969), Washington State Representative 1995–2005, U.S. Representative from Washington 2005–2025. Daughter-in-law of David Rodgers.

== The Rodmans ==
- John Rodman (1775–1847), New York County District Attorney 1815–17.
  - William B. Rodman (1817–1893), justice of the North Carolina Supreme Court 1868–78. Nephew of John Rodman.
    - William B. Rodman Jr. (1889–1976), North Carolina state Senator 1937–39, North Carolina state representative 1950–55, North Carolina Attorney General 1955–56, justice of the North Carolina Supreme Court 1956–65. Grandson of William B. Rodman.

== The Rodneys ==
- Caesar Rodney (1728–1784), Sheriff of Kent County, Delaware 1755–58; Justice of the Peace for New Castle, Delaware 1759–69; Justice of the Delaware Supreme Court 1769–77; Delaware Assemblyman 1761–76; Delegate to the Continental Congress from Delaware 1774–76 1777–78 1778–79 1782–83 1783 1783–84; President of Delaware 1778–81; Delaware Councilman 1783–84. Brother of Thomas Rodney.
- Thomas Rodney (1744–1811), Justice of the Peace for Kent County, Delaware; Delaware State Representative 1781 1786 1787; Delegate to the Continental Congress from Delaware 1781–82 1784 1785–86 1786–87; Chief Justice of Mississippi 1803–11. Brother of Caesar Rodney.
- Daniel Rodney (1764–1846), Justice of the Peace from Georgetown, Delaware 1793–1806, candidate for Governor of Delaware 1810; Governor of Delaware 1814–1917; U.S. Representative from Delaware 1822–23; U.S. Senator from Delaware 1826–27. Cousin of Caesar Rodney and Thomas Rodney.
- Caleb Rodney (1767–1840), Delaware State Representative 1802–06 1812–14, Delaware State Senator 1806–10 1816–17 1818–22, Governor of Delaware 1822–23. Brother of Daniel Rodney.
  - Caesar A. Rodney (1772–1824), Delaware State Representative 1797–1803, U.S. Representative from Delaware 1803–05 1821–22, U.S. Attorney General 1807–11, Delaware State Senator 1815–18, U.S. Senator from Delaware 1822–23, U.S. Minister to Argentina 1823–24. Son of Thomas Rodney.
  - George B. Rodney (1803–1883), U.S. Representative from Delaware 1841–45. Cousin of Caesar Rodney, Thomas Rodney, and Caesar A. Rodney.
  - Caleb S. Layton (1798–1882), Delaware State Representative 1826–30, Delaware Secretary of State 1830–33 1836–37, Justice of the Delaware Superior Court. Son-in-law of Caleb Rodney.
    - John M. Richardson (1858–1930), candidate for U.S. Representative from Delaware 1928. Great-grandson-in-law of Caleb Rodney.

NOTE: John M. Richardson was also brother-in-law of Delaware State Representative Harry V. Lyons.

== The Roemers ==
- Charles E. Roemer, II, aka Budgie Roemer (1923–2012), Louisiana Commissioner of Administration 1972–80. Father of Buddy Roemer.
- Charles Elson Roemer, III, better known as Buddy Roemer (1943–2021) US Representative from Louisiana 1981–88, Governor of Louisiana 1988–92. Son of Budgie Roemer.
- Charles E. Roemer, IV, better known as Chas Roemer, represents District 6 on the Louisiana Board of Elementary and Secondary Education. Son of Buddy Roemer, resident of Baton Rouge.

== The Rogers of Florida ==
- Dwight L. Rogers (1886–1954), Florida State Representative 1930–38, U.S. Representative from Florida 1945–54. Father of Paul G. Rogers.
  - Paul G. Rogers (1921–2008), U.S. Representative from Florida 1955–79. Son of Dwight L. Rogers.

== The Rogers of New York and Pennsylvania ==
- Thomas Jones Rogers (1781–1832), U.S. Representative from Pennsylvania 1818–24. Father of William Findlay Rogers.
  - William Findlay Rogers (1820–1899), Comptroller of Buffalo, New York 1847; Mayor of Buffalo, New York 1849; U.S. Representative from New York 1883–85. Son of Thomas Jones Rogers.

== The Rogers of Massachusetts ==
- John Jacob Rogers (1881–1925), U.S. Representative from Massachusetts 1913–25.
- Edith Nourse Rogers (1881–1960), U.S. Representative from Massachusetts 1925–60. Wife of John Jacob Rogers.

== The Rollins ==
- Edward H. Rollins (1824–1889), New Hampshire State Representative 1855–57, delegate to the Republican National Convention 1860 1884, U.S. Representative from New Hampshire 1861–67, U.S. Senator from New Hampshire 1877–83. Father of Frank W. Rollins.
  - Frank W. Rollins (1860–1915), New Hampshire State Senator 1895–96, Governor of New Hampshire 1899–1901. Son of Edward H. Rollins.

== The Rolphs ==
- James Rolph (1869–1934), Mayor of San Francisco, California 1912–31; Governor of California 1931–34. Brother of Thomas Rolph.
- Thomas Rolph (1885–1956), U.S. Representative from California 1941–45. Brother of James Rolph.
  - Joseph C. Wilson (1949–2019), U.S. Ambassador to Gabon and São Tomé and Príncipe 1992–95. Grandnephew of James Rolph.

== The Romers ==
- Roy Romer (born 1928), Colorado State Representative 1959–63, candidate for U.S. Senate from Colorado 1966, Treasurer of Colorado 1977–87, Governor of Colorado 1987–99, Chairman of the Democratic National Committee 1997–99, delegate to the Democratic National Convention 2000. Father of Chris Romer.
  - Chris Romer (born 1959), Colorado State Senator 2007–2011. Son of Roy Romer.

== The Romneys ==
See Pratt family and Romney family.

== The Rooneys ==
- Dan Rooney (1932–2017), United States Ambassador to Ireland and chairman emeritus of the Pittsburgh Steelers, founded by his father, Art Rooney.
  - Patrick Rooney Jr. (born 1964), Florida State Representative, President of Palm Beach Kennel Club. Nephew of Dan Rooney. Brother of Thomas J. Rooney and Brian J. Rooney.
  - Chris Rooney (born 1968), Campaign manager for brothers Pat Jr. and Tom.
  - Thomas J. Rooney (born 1970), U.S. Representative from Florida 2009–19. Brother of Patrick Rooney Jr. and Brian J. Rooney.
  - Brian J. Rooney (born 1972), deputy director of Michigan Department of Human Services, candidate in 2010 for U.S. Representative from Michigan. Member of the board of directors for the Pittsburgh Steelers. Brother of Patrick Rooney Jr. and Thomas J. Rooney.

== The Roosevelts ==
See Roosevelt family political line.

== The Rosecrans and Tooles ==
- William S. Rosecrans (1819–1898), U.S. Minister to Mexico 1868–69, U.S. Representative from California 1881–85. Father-in-law of Joseph K. Toole.
  - Joseph K. Toole (1851–1929), Montana Territory Representative 1879–81, Montana Territory Councilman 1881–83, delegate to the Montana Territory Constitutional Convention 1884, U.S. Congressional Delegate from the Montana Territory 1885–89, delegate to the Montana Constitutional Convention 1889, Governor of Montana 1889–93 1901–08, delegate to the Democratic National Convention 1892 1904. Son-in-law of William S. Rosecrans.

== The Ross ==
- Claude G. Ross (1917–2006), U.S. Vice Consul in Mexico City, Mexico 1940–41; U.S. Vice Consul in Quito, Ecuador 1941–45; U.S. Consul in Athens, Greece 1945–49; U.S. Consul in Nouméa, New Caledonia 1949–51; U.S. Consul in Beirut, Lebanon 1954–56; U.S. Consul in Conakry, Guinea 1960–62; U.S. Ambassador to the Central African Republic 1963–67; U.S. Ambassador to Haiti 1967–69; U.S. Ambassador to Tanzania 1969–72. Father of Christopher W.S. Ross.
  - Christopher W.S. Ross (born 1943), U.S. Ambassador to Algeria 1988–91, U.S. Ambassador to Syria 1991–98. Son of Claude G. Ross.

== The Ross of Pennsylvania ==
- John Ross (1770–1834), Pennsylvania State Representative 1800, Orphans' Court Clerk in Pennsylvania 1800–03, Northampton County, Pennsylvania Register 1800–09; U.S. Representative from Pennsylvania 1809–11 1815–18; Pennsylvania District Judge 1818–30; Justice of the Pennsylvania Supreme Court 1830–34. Father of Thomas Ross.
  - Thomas Ross (1806–1865), U.S. Representative from Pennsylvania 1849–53. Son of John Ross.

== The Ross of Wyoming ==
- William B. Ross (1873–1924), Governor of Wyoming 1923–24.
- Nellie Tayloe Ross (1876–1977), Governor of Wyoming 1925–27, Director of the United States Mint 1933–53. Wife of William B. Ross.

== The Ross, Hewins, and Snyders ==
- Edmund G. Ross (1826–1907), delegate to the Kansas Constitutional Convention 1859, U.S. Senator from Kansas 1866–71, candidate for Governor of Kansas 1880, Governor of New Mexico Territory 1885–89. Brother of William Wallace Ross.
- William Wallace Ross (1828–1889), delegate to the Kansas Constitutional Convention 1857, delegate to the Republican National Convention 1860, Mayor of Topeka, Kansas 1865–66. Brother of Edmund G. Ross.
- Edwin Mortimer Hewins (1839–1898), Kansas State Representative 1877–79, Kansas State Senator 1885–87. Brother-in-law of Edmund G. Ross and William Wallace Ross.
  - Meredith P. Snyder (1859–1937), Los Angeles, California Councilman 1894–96; Mayor of Los Angeles, California 1896–98 1900–04 1919–21. Son-in-law of William Wallace Ross.

NOTE: William Wallace Ross was also great-grandson-in-law of Massachusetts State Senator Simon Frye.

== The Ross and McCaugheys ==
- Wilbur Ross (born 1937), United States Secretary of Commerce 2017–2021.
- Betsy McCaughey (born 1948), Lieutenant Governor of New York 1995–98. Ex-wife of Wilbur Ross.

== The Rossellós ==
- Pedro Rosselló (born 1944), President of the New Progressive Party (Puerto Rico) 1991–1999, 2003–2008; Governor of Puerto Rico 1993–2001; member of the Puerto Rico Senate 2005–2009; Shadow Member of the U.S. House of Representatives from Puerto Rico 2017–2019. Husband of Maga, father of Ricardo, and father-in-law of Beatriz.
- Maga Nevares de Rosselló (born 1948), First Lady of Puerto Rico 1993–2001. Wife of Pedro, mother of Ricardo, mother -in-law of Beatriz.
  - Ricardo Rosselló (born 1979), President of the New Progressive Party 2016–2019; Governor of Puerto Rico 2017–2019; Shadow Member of the U.S. House of Representatives from Puerto Rico 2021–2024. Husband of Beatriz.
  - Beatriz Rosselló (born 1985), First Lady of Puerto Rico 2017–2019. Wife of Ricardo.

== The Roths ==
- William Roth (1921–2003), U.S. Representative from Delaware 1967–70, U.S. Senator from Delaware 1971–2001.
- Jane Richards Roth (born 1935), Judge of the United States District Court for the District of Delaware 1985–91, Judge of the United States Court of Appeals for the Third Circuit 1991–2006. Wife of William Roth.

== The Roths of Wisconsin ==
- Toby Roth (born 1938), Wisconsin State Assemblyman 1972–1978, U.S. Representative from Wisconsin 1979–1997. Uncle of Roger Roth.
  - Roger Roth (born 1978), Wisconsin State Assemblyman 2007–2011, Wisconsin State Senator 2015–2023, President of the Wisconsin State Senate 2017–2021. Nephew of Toby Roth.

== The Roudebushes ==
- Oscar H. Roudebush, Treasurer of Crawford County, Pennsylvania 1920; delegate to the Democratic National Convention 1928. Third cousin once removed of Allen C. Loudebush.
  - Allen C. Roudebush (1884–1960), Mayor of Norwood, Ohio 1938–43. Third cousin once removed of Oscar H. Roudebush.
    - Richard L. Roudebush (1918–1995), U.S. Representative from Indiana 1961–71, candidate for U.S. Senate from Indiana 1970. Fourth cousin once removed of Allen C. Roudebush.

== The Rounds ==
- Marion M. Rounds (born 1954), South Dakota State Representative 1991–2001, Governor of South Dakota 2003–11, delegate to the Republican National Convention 2004 2008, U.S. Senator from South Dakota 2015–present. Brother of Tim Rounds.
- Tim Rounds (born 1959), South Dakota State Representative 2003–2011 and 2013–2021.

== The Royalls ==
- Kenneth Claiborne Royall (1894–1971), North Carolina State Senator 1927, U.S. Secretary of War 1947, U.S. Secretary of the Army 1947–49, delegate to the Democratic National Convention 1964. Husband of Margaret Best Royall.
- Margaret Best Royall, delegate to the Democratic National Convention 1948. Wife of Kenneth Claiborne Ryoall.
  - Kenneth Claiborne Royall Jr. (1919–1999), North Carolina State Representative 1967–72, North Carolina State Senator 1973–92. Son of Kenneth Claiborne Royall and Margaret Best Royall.

== The Roybals ==
- Edward R. Roybal (1916–2005), Los Angeles, California Councilman 1949–62; candidate for Lieutenant Governor of California 1954; delegate to the Democratic National Convention 1956 1960 1964; U.S. Representative from California 1963–93. Father of Lucille Roybal-Allard.
  - Lucille Roybal-Allard (born 1941), California Assemblywoman 1987–92, U.S. Representative from California 1993–2023, delegate to the Democratic National Convention 2000 2004 2008. Daughter of Edward R. Roybal.

== The Ruffins ==
- Thomas Ruffin (1787–1870), member of the North Carolina House of Commons, North Carolina Superior Court Judge 1816–18 1825–28, Justice of the North Carolina Supreme Court 1829–33 1858–59, Chief Justice of the North Carolina Supreme Court 1833–52. Distant cousin of Thomas Hart Ruffin.
  - Thomas Hart Ruffin (1820–1863), U.S. Representative from North Carolina 1853–61, Delegate to the Confederate States Provisional Congress 1861. Distant cousin of Thomas Ruffin.
  - Charles R. Thomas (1861–1931), North Carolina State Representative 1887, Attorney of Craven County, North Carolina 1890–96; U.S. Representative from North Carolina 1899–1911. Son-in-law of Thomas Ruffin.

NOTE: Charles R. Thomas was also son of U.S. Representative Charles R. Thomas.

== The Runnels of Texas ==
- Hiram G. Runnels (1796–1857), Auditor of Mississippi 1822–30, member of the Mississippi Legislature 1830 1841, Governor of Mississippi 1833–35, delegate to the Texas Constitutional Convention 1845. Uncle of Hardin Richard Runnels.
  - Hardin Richard Runnels (1820–1873), Texas State Representative 1847–54, Lieutenant Governor of Texas 1855–57, Governor of Texas 1857–59, delegate to the Democratic National Convention 1860, delegate to the Texas Constitutional Convention 1866. Nephew of Hiram G. Runnels.
  - William R. Baker (1820–1890), Texas State Senator 1874–75, Mayor of Houston, Texas 1880–86. Nephew by marriage of Hiram G. Runnels

== The Runnels of New Mexico ==
- Harold L. Runnels (1924–1980), New Mexico Representative 1971–1980, New Mexico State Senator 1960–1970. Married to,
- Dorothy Runnels, candidate for New Mexico Representative. Mother of,
  - Mike Runnels (1945–2015), Lieutenant Governor of New Mexico 1983–1987. Married to,
  - Jennifer Runnels, Second Lady of New Mexico 1983–1987. Mother of,
    - Joshua Runnels, North Carolina lawyer and former government aide.

== The Runners ==
- George Runner (born 1952), California State Assemblyman 1996–2002, California State Senator 2004–10, California State Board of Equalization Board Member 2011–19.
- Sharon Runner (1954–2016), Member of the California State Assembly 2002–08, California State Senator 2011–12 2015–16. Wife of George Runner.

== The Ruppersbergers ==
- C. Albert Ruppersberger (born 1921), delegate to the Democratic National Convention 2000. Father of Charles A. Ruppersberger III.
  - Charles A. Ruppersberger III (born 1946), Baltimore County, Maryland Councilman; Baltimore County, Maryland Executive 1994–2002; delegate to the Democratic National Convention 1996 2000 2004 2008; U.S. Representative from Maryland 2003–2025. Son of C. Albert Ruppersberger.

== The Rushes ==
- Benjamin Rush (1746–1813), Delegate to the Continental Congress from Pennsylvania 1776–77. Father of Richard Rush.
  - Richard Rush (1780–1859), Attorney General of Pennsylvania 1811, Attorney General of the United States 1814–17, U.S. Minister to the United Kingdom 1818–25, U.S. Secretary of the Treasury 1825–29, candidate for Vice President of the United States 1828, U.S. Minister to France 1847–49. Son of Benjamin Rush.

== The Rusks of Wisconsin ==
- Jeremiah McLain Rusk (1830–1893), U.S. Representative from Wisconsin 1871–1877, Governor of Wisconsin 1882–1889, U.S. Secretary of Agriculture 1889–1893. Father of Lycurgus J. Rusk.
  - Lycurgus J. Rusk (1851–1928), Wisconsin State Assemblyman 1899. Son of Jeremiah McLain Rusk.

== The Russells of Georgia ==
- Richard Russell Sr. (1861–1938), Georgia State Representative 1882, candidate for Governor of Georgia 1906 1911, Solicitor General of Georgia Superior Court, Judge of Georgia Court of Appeals, candidate for U.S. Representative from Georgia 1916, Chief Justice of Georgia Supreme Court 1922–38, candidate for U.S. Senate from Georgia 1926. Father of Richard Russell Jr. and Robert Russell.
  - Richard Russell Jr. (1897–1971), Georgia State Representative 1921–31, Governor of Georgia 1931–33, U.S. Senator from Georgia 1933–71, candidate for the Democratic nomination for President of the United States 1952, delegate to the Democratic National Convention 1952. Son of Richard Russell Sr.
  - Robert Lee Russell (1900–1955), U.S. District Court Judge in George 1940–49, Judge of U.S. Court of Appeals 1949–55. Son of Richard Russell Sr.
  - Hugh Peterson (1898–1961), U.S. Representative from Georgia 1935–47. Son-in-law of Richard Russell Sr.
    - Robert Russell Jr., (1925–1965) Georgia State Representative 1951–58, Democratic National Committeeman 1960–62, Judge of Georgia Court of Appeals 1962–65. Son of Robert Russell.
    - Walter B. Russell Jr. (1925–1965), Georgia State Representative 1971–76, chairman of the Board of County Commissioners DeKalb County, Georgia 1977–80. Nephew of Richard Russell Jr.
    - Ernest Vandiver (1918–2005), Lieutenant Governor of Georgia 1955–59, Governor of Georgia 1959–63, candidate for Governor of Georgia 1966, withdrew nomination; candidate for U.S. Senate from Georgia 1972. Nephew-in-law of Richard Russell Jr.

== The Russells of Massachusetts ==
- Charles Theodore Russell (1815–1896), Mayor of Cambridge, Massachusetts 1861–63. Father of William Russell.
  - William Russell (1857–1896), Mayor of Cambridge, Massachusetts 1884–87; Governor of Massachusetts 1891–94. Father of Richard M. Russell.
    - Richard M. Russell (1891–1977), Mayor of Cambridge, Massachusetts 1930–36; Member of the U.S. House of Representatives from Massachusetts's 9th congressional district.

== The Russells of Pennsylvania ==
- James McPherson Russell (1786–1870), Burgess of Bedford Borough, Pennsylvania 1818–19; delegate to the Pennsylvania Constitutional Convention 1837; U.S. Representative from Pennsylvania 1842–43. Father of Samuel Lyon Russell.
  - Samuel Lyon Russell (1816–1891), Prosecuting Attorney of Bedford County, Pennsylvania; U.S. Representative from Pennsylvania 1853–55; delegate to the Pennsylvania Constitutional Convention 1873; Bedford, Pennsylvania Councilman; member of the Bedford, Pennsylvania School Board. Son of James McPherson Russell.

== The Russells and Nelsons ==
- Ebenezer Russell (1747–1839), Member of the New York State Assembly, Member of the New York State Senate
  - John Russell (1772–1842), U.S. Representative from New York 1805–09. Son of Ebenezer Russell.
    - Samuel Nelson (1792–1873), Associate Justice of the Supreme Court of the United States 1845–72. Son-in-law of John Russell.
      - Rensselaer Nelson (1826–1904), Judge of the United States District Court for the District of Minnesota 1858–96. Son of Samuel Nelson.

== The Rutledges ==
- John Rutledge (1739–1800), Delegate to the Continental Congress from South Carolina 1774, President of South Carolina 1776–78, Governor of South Carolina 1779, Justice of the U.S. Supreme Court 1789–91, Justice of the South Carolina Supreme Court 1790, Chief Justice of the U.S. Supreme Court 1795. Brother of Edward Rutledge.
- Edward Rutledge (1749–1800), Delegate to the Continental Congress from South Carolina 1774–76, South Carolina State Representative 1782, Governor of South Carolina 1798–1800. Brother of John Rutledge.
  - John Rutledge Jr. (1766–1819), member of the South Carolina Legislature, U.S. Representative from South Carolina 1797–1803. Son of John Rutledge.
    - Wiley Blount Rutledge (1894–1949), Judge of the United States Court of Appeals for the District of Columbia Circuit 1939–43, Associate Justice of the Supreme Court of the United States, 1943–49. Great-great-grandson of Edward Rutledge.

NOTE: Edward Rutledge was also brother-in-law of U.S. Representative Henry Middleton.

== The Ryans ==
- Goldsmith W. Hewitt (1834–1895), Alabama State Representative 1870–71 1886–88, Alabama State Senator 1872–74, U.S. Representative from Alabama 1875–79 1881–85. Father-in-law of William C. Fitts.
  - William C. Fitts (1866–1954), Attorney General of Alabama 1894–98, delegate to the Alabama Constitutional Convention 1901. Son-in-law of Goldsmith W. Hewitt.
    - Bernard Ryan Sr., Chairman of Orleans County, New York 1927; delegate to the Democratic National Convention 1928; Judge of the New York Court of Claims.Son-in-law of William C. Fitts.
      - William Fitts Ryan (1922–1972), delegate to the Democratic National Convention 1968, U.S. Representative from New York 1961–72. Son of Bernard Ryan Sr.
      - Priscilla M. Ryan, candidate for U.S. Representative from New York 1972. Wife of William Fitts Ryan.

Priscilla Ryan was the daughter of Charles Clagett Marbury (1898–1991), Maryland House of Delegates, Maryland State Senator, Judge Maryland Court of Appeals.
