= Illinois Gateway Amendment =

Illinois Gateway Amendment may refer to:

- Illinois Gateway Amendment (1946)
- Illinois Gateway Amendment (1950)
