= List of United States political families (Q) =

The following is an alphabetical list of political families in the United States whose last name begins with Q.

== The Quayles ==
- James Danforth Quayle (born 1947), U.S. Representative from Indiana 1977–81, U.S. Senator from Indiana 1981–89, Vice President of the United States 1989–93, candidate for the Republican nomination for President of the United States 2000. Husband of Marilyn Quayle. Father of Benjamin Quayle.
  - Benjamin Quayle (born 1976), U.S. Representative from Arizona 2011–13. Son of James Danforth Quayle.

== The Quincys ==
- Josiah Quincy III (1772–1864), Massachusetts State Senator 1804–05 1813–20, U.S. Representative from Massachusetts 1805–13, Massachusetts State Representative 1821–22, Mayor of Boston, Massachusetts 1823–28. Father of Josiah Quincy Jr.
  - Josiah Quincy Jr. (1802–1882), Mayor of Boston, Massachusetts 1846–48; candidate for Governor of Massachusetts 1856. Son of Josiah Quincy III.
    - Josiah Quincy (1859–1919), Massachusetts State Representative 1887–88 1890–91, Chairman of the Massachusetts Democratic Party 1891–92 1906, Mayor of Boston, Massachusetts 1895–99; candidate for Governor of Massachusetts 1901; delegate to the Massachusetts Constitutional Convention 1917; candidate for Attorney General of Massachusetts 1917. Grandson of Josiah Quincy Jr.

NOTE: Josiah Quincy III was also related through marriage to U.S. President John Adams and Massachusetts Governor John Hancock. Josiah Quincy was also son-in-law of Rhode Island Lieutenant Governor Samuel R. Honey.

== The Quinns ==
- John F. Quinn (born 1951), U.S. Representative from New York 1993–2005. Father of Jack Quinn III.
  - Jack Quinn III (born 1978), New York Assemblyman 2005–10. Son of John F. Quinn.

== The Quirks and Williams ==
- Daniel T. Quirk (1903–1969), Mayor of Ypsilanti, Michigan 1947–53. Brother-in-law of G. Mennen Williams.
- G. Mennen Williams (1911–1988), Governor of Michigan 1949–60, delegate to the Democratic National Convention 1952 1956 1960 1964, candidate for U.S. Senate from Michigan 1966, U.S. Ambassador to the Philippines 1968–69, Justice of the Michigan Supreme Court 1971–83, Chief Justice of the Michigan Supreme Court 1983–86. Brother-in-law of Daniel T. Quirk.

== The Quitugua and San Nicolas family ==
- Ignacio P. Quitugua (1909–1973), Guam Territorial Legislator 1951–1953 1967–1969. Father of Franklin Quitugua.
  - Franklin Quitugua (1933–2015), Guam Territory Legislator 1977–1991, Chairman of the Democratic Party of Guam 1979–1981, Speaker of the Legislature of Guam 1987–1989. Son of Ignacio P. Quitugua.
    - Michael San Nicolas (born 1981), Guam Territorial Legislator 2013–2019, U.S. House Delegate from Guam 2019–present. Grandson of Franklin Quitugua.
