= 1946 Illinois elections =

- November 5, 1946

Elections were held in Illinois on Tuesday, November 5, 1946.

Primaries were held April 9, 1946.

== Election information ==
1946 was a midterm election year in the United States.

=== Turnout ===
In the primary election 1,531,657 ballots were cast (741,821 Democratic and 789,836 Republican).

In the general election 3,619,332 ballots were cast.

== Federal elections ==
=== United States House ===
1946 United States House of Representatives elections in Illinois
- November 5, 1946

All 26 Illinois seats to the United States House of Representatives
	Majority party	Minority party
Party	Republican	Democratic
Seats won	20	6
Democratic
50–60%
70–80%
Republican
50–60%
60–70%
70–80%

All 26 Illinois seats in the United States House of Representatives were up for election in 1946.

Republicans flipped five Republican-held seats, leaving the Illinois House delegation to consist of 20 Republicans and 6 Democrats.

== State elections ==
=== Treasurer ===
1946 Illinois State Treasurer election
- November 5, 1946
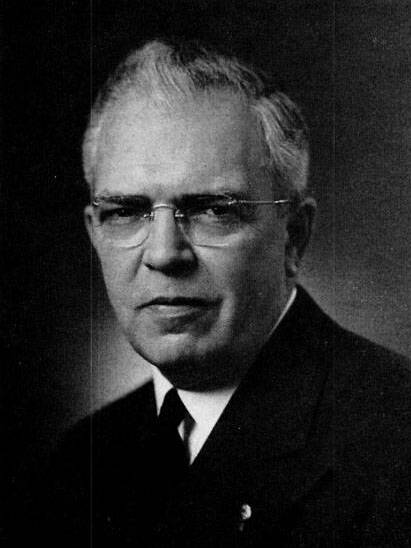

Nominee	Richard Yates Rowe	Sam Keys
Party	Republican	Democratic
Popular vote	1,959,881	1,480,597
Percentage	56.73%	42.86%
- County results Rowe: 50–60% 60–70% 70–80% 80–90% Keys: 40–50% 50–60%
Treasurer before election
Conrad F. Becker
Republican
Elected Treasurer
Richard Yates Rowe
Republican

Incumbent first-term Treasurer, Republican Conrad F. Becker, did not seek reelection. Republican Richard Yates Rowe was elected to succeed him.

==== Democratic primary ====
Treasurer Democratic primary
Party	Candidate	Votes	%
Democratic	Sam Keys	385,419	100
Total votes		385,419	100

==== Republican primary ====
Treasurer Republican primary
Party	Candidate	Votes	%
Republican	Richard Yates Rowe	411,070	61.22
Republican	Stephen A. Day	202,594	30.17
Republican	I. Jay Brown	57,838	8.61
Write-in	Others	4	0.00
Total votes		671,506	100

==== General election ====
Treasurer election
Party	Candidate	Votes	%
Republican	Richard Yates Rowe	1,959,881	56.73
Democratic	Sam Keys	1,480,597	42.86
Prohibition	Robert W. Melven	14,144	0.41
Total votes		3,454,622	100

=== Superintendent of Public Instruction ===
1946 Illinois Superintendent of Public Instruction election
- November 5, 1946
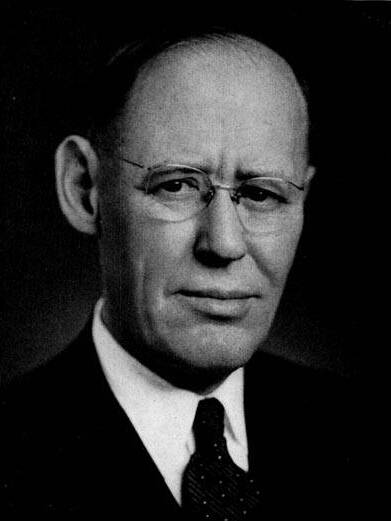

Nominee	Vernon L. Nickell	C. H. Engle
Party	Republican	Democratic
Popular vote	1,959,738	1,439,645
Percentage	57.37%	42.14%
Superintendent before election
Vernon L. Nickell
Republican
Elected Superintendent
Vernon L. Nickell
Republican

Incumbent Superintendent of Public Instruction Vernon L. Nickell, a Republican, was reelected to a second term.

==== Democratic primary ====
Superintendent of Public Instruction Democratic primary
Party	Candidate	Votes	%
Democratic	C. H. Engle	567,801	100
Total votes		567,801	100

==== Republican primary ====
Superintendent of Public Instruction Republican primary
Party	Candidate	Votes	%
Republican	Vernon L. Nickell (incumbent)	599,582	100
Write-in	Others	5	0.00
Total votes		599,587	100

==== General election ====
Superintendent of Public Instruction election
Party	Candidate	Votes	%
Republican	Vernon L. Nickell (incumbent)	1,959,738	57.37
Democratic	C. Hobart Engle	1,439,645	42.14
Prohibition	Henry L. Lundquist	16,813	0.49
Total votes		3,416,196	100

=== State Senate ===
Seats in the Illinois Senate were up for election in 1946. Republicans retained control of the chamber.

=== State House of Representatives ===
Seats in the Illinois House of Representatives were up for election in 1946. Republicans retained control of the chamber.

=== Trustees of University of Illinois ===
1946 Trustees of University of Illinois election
- November 5, 1946

3 out of 9 seats on the University of Illinois Board of Trustees 5 seats needed for a majority
	Majority party	Minority party
Party	Republican	Democratic
Seats before	6	3
Seats after	6	3
Seat change	Steady	Steady
Popular vote	5,763,206	4,280,012
Percentage	57.11%	42.42%
Swing	▲2.03%	▼8.10%
Seats up	3	0
Races won	3	0

An election was held for three of nine seats for Trustees of University of Illinois. Republicans won all three seats. However, since all three seats up for election were already held by Republicans, this did not change the partisan composition of the University of Illinois Board of Trustees, with the board's 9–3 Republican majority over Democrats being retained.

First-term Republican incumbents Park Livingston and John R. Fornof were reelected. New Republican member Doris Simpson Holt was elected. Third-term Republican incumbent Helen M. L. Grigsby was not renominated.

Trustees of the University of Illinois election
Party	Candidate	Votes	%
Republican	Park Livingston (incumbent)	1,961,346½	19.44
Republican	John R. Fornof (incumbent)	1,915,895	18.69
Republican	Doris Simpson Holt	1,885,964½	18.69
Democratic	Don Forsyth	1,463,251½	14.50
Democratic	James Everett Etherton	1,420,780	14.08
Democratic	Albert H. Wohlers	1,395,980½	13.83
Prohibition	Henry Johnson Long	16,488½	0.16
Prohibition	Mildred E. Young	16,202	0.16
Prohibition	Louis Gilbert Krandell	14,776	0.15
Total votes		10,090,684½	100

=== Judicial elections ===
On June 3, 1946, elections were held to fill vacancies on the Superior Court of Cook County. On November 5, 1946, a special election was held to fill a vacancy on the Circuit Court of Cook County. On December 17, 1946, a special election was held to fill a vacancy on the Sixth Judicial Circuit.

=== Ballot measures ===
Two measures was put before voters in 1946.

==== Illinois Gateway Amendment ====
The Illinois Gateway Amendment, a proposed amendment to Section 2 of Article XIV of the Constitution, failed to meet the threshold for approval.

If approved, this amendment would have enabled the legislature to submit legislatively referred amendments to up to three constitutional articles per session.

In order to be approved, legislatively referred constitutional amendments required approval equal to a majority of voters voting in the entire general election.

Illinois Gateway Amendment
Option	Votes	% of all ballots cast
Yes	1,273,653	35.19
No	368,108	10.17
Total votes	1,641,761	45.36

==== World War II Veterans' Compensation Act ====
The World War II Veterans' Compensation Act, a legislatively referred bond issue, was approved by voters.

The bond issue would be used to compensate veterans of World War II.

It was required to be approved by a vote equal to vote for whichever chamber of the state legislature received the greatest vote total. In this case, that meant it needed to receive 1,709,721 votes.

World War II Veterans' Compensation Act
Candidate	Votes	%
Yes	2,173,425	68.92
No	980,345	31.09
Total votes	3,153,770	100

== Local elections ==
Local elections were held. These included county elections, such as the Cook County elections.
