= 1966 Illinois elections =

- November 8, 1966
- Turnout: 73.54%

Elections were held in Illinois on Tuesday, November 8, 1966.

Primaries were held on June 14, 1966.

== Election information ==
1966 was a midterm election year in the United States.

The overall results in Illinois are regarded to have been a wave election in favor of Republicans. The state treasurer contest was a key exception to this overall trend.

=== Turnout ===
Turnout in the primary was 32.20%, with 1,791,494 ballots cast (1,060,189 Democratic and 731,305 Republican).

Turnout in the general election was 73.54%, with 3,928,478 ballots cast.

== Federal elections ==
=== United States Senate ===
Incumbent Senator Paul Douglas, a Democrat seeking a fourth term, was defeated by Republican Charles H. Percy.

=== United States House ===
All 24 Illinois seats in the United States House of Representatives were up for election in 1966.

Republicans flipped one seat, leaving the Illinois House delegation to consist of 12 Democrats and 12 Republicans.

== State elections ==
=== Treasurer ===
1966 Illinois State Treasurer election
- November 8, 1966
- Turnout: 70.01%
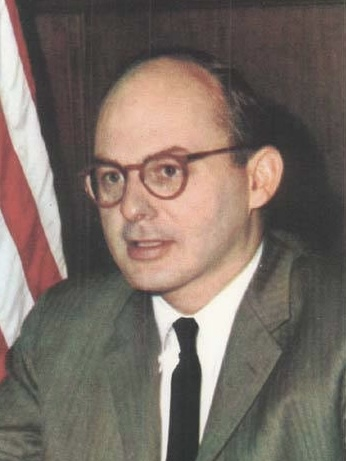

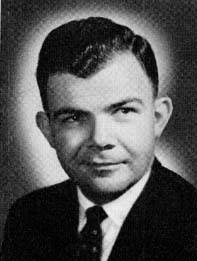
Nominee	Adlai Stevenson III	Harris Rowe
Party	Democratic	Republican
Popular vote	1,889,595	1,849,940
Percentage	50.53%	49.47%
- County results Stevenson: 50–60% 60–70% Rowe: 50–60% 60–70% 70–80%
Treasurer before election
William J. Scott
Republican
Elected Treasurer
Adlai Stevenson III
Democratic

Incumbent Treasurer was William J. Scott, a Republican. Democrat Adlai Stevenson III was elected to succeed him in office.

==== Democratic primary ====
Treasurer Democratic primary
Party	Candidate	Votes	%
Democratic	Adlai E. Stevenson III	782,650	100
Total votes		782,650	100

==== Republican primary ====
Treasurer Republican primary
Party	Candidate	Votes	%
Republican	Harris Rowe	552,553	100
Total votes		552,553	100

==== General election ====
Treasurer election
Party	Candidate	Votes	%
Democratic	Adlai Stevenson III	1,889,595	50.53
Republican	Harris Rowe	1,849,940	49.47
Write-in	Robert V. Sabonjian	124	0.00
Write-in	Others	41	0.00
Total votes		3,739,700	100

=== Superintendent of Public Instruction ===
1966 Illinois Superintendent of Public Instruction election
- November 7, 1966
- Turnout: 69.24%
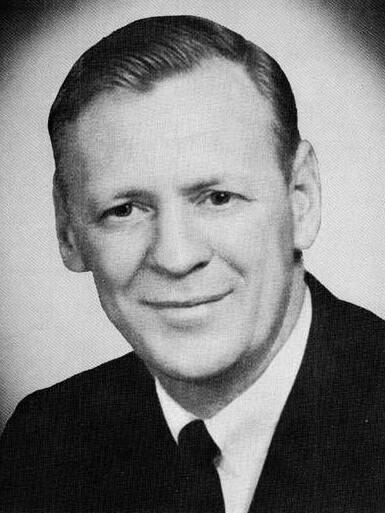

Nominee	Ray Page	Don M. Prince
Party	Republican	Democratic
Popular vote	1,999,279	1,699,367
Percentage	54.05%	45.95%
- County results Page: 50–60% 60–70% 70–80% Prince: 50–60%
Superintendent before election
Ray Page
Republican
Elected Superintendent
Ray Page
Republican

Incumbent Superintendent of Public Instruction Ray Page, a Republican, won a second term.

==== Democratic primary ====
Superintendent of Public Instruction Democratic primary
Party	Candidate	Votes	%
Democratic	Don M. Prince	664,289	100
Write-in	Others	3	0.0
Total votes		664,289	100

==== Republican primary ====
Superintendent of Public Instruction Republican primary
Party	Candidate	Votes	%
Republican	Ray Page (incumbent)	445,691	74.71
Republican	Robert A. Campbell	150,896	25.29
Total votes		596,587	100

==== General election ====
Superintendent of Public Instruction election
Party	Candidate	Votes	%
Republican	Ray Page (incumbent)	1,999,279	54.05
Democratic	Don M. Prince	1,699,367	45.95
Write-in	Others	5	0.00
Total votes		3,698,651	100

=== State Senate ===
Seats in the Illinois Senate were up for election in 1966. Republicans retained control of the chamber.

=== State House of Representatives ===
Seats in the Illinois House of Representatives were up for election in 1966. Republicans flipped control of the chamber.

=== Trustees of University of Illinois ===
1966 Trustees of University of Illinois election
- November 8, 1966

An election was held for three of nine seats for Trustees of University of Illinois.

The election saw the election of new Republican members Donald R. Grimes, Ralph Crane Hahn, and James A. Weatherly.

Third-term incumbent Democrats Kenney E. Williamson and Frances Best Watkins lost reelection. Incumbent third-term Republican Wayne A. Johnston Sr. was not renominated.

Trustees of the University of Illinois election
Party	Candidate	Votes	%
Republican	Donald R. Grimes	1,983,311	18.35
Republican	Ralph C. Hahn	1,960,089.5	18.13
Republican	James A. Weatherly	1,922,462	17.78
Democratic	Frances Best Watkins (incumbent)	1,678,404.5	15.53
Democratic	Kenney E. Williamson (incumbent)	1,634,341	15.12
Democratic	Richard O. Hart	1,632,172	15.10
Total votes		10,810,780	100

=== Ballot measures ===
Three ballot measures were put before voters in 1966. One was a legislatively referred state statute, and two were legislatively referred constitutional amendments.

In order to be approved, legislatively referred state statutes required the support of a majority of those voting on the amendment. In order to be placed on the ballot, proposed legislatively referred constitutional amendments needed to be approved by two-thirds of each house of the Illinois General Assembly. In order to be approved, they required approval of either two-thirds of those voting on the amendment itself or a majority of all ballots cast in the general elections.

==== County Officers' Re-Election Amendment ====
The County Officers' Re-Election Amendment, a legislatively referred constitutional amendment, was put to a vote. It would have amended Section 8 of Article X of the Illinois Constitution. It failed to meet either threshold for passage.

County Officers' Re-Election Amendment
Option	Votes	% of votes on referendum	% of all ballots cast
Yes	1,808,491	59.18	46.04
No	1,247,248	40.82	31.75
Total votes	3,055,739	100	77.78
Voter turnout	57.21%		

Amendment results by county Yes: 60–70%; 50–60%; No: 60–70%; 50–60%

==== General Banking Law Amendment ====
General Banking Law Amendment was approved by voters as a legislatively referred state statute. It modified the state's banking law. To pass, it had required a majority of those voting on the article to approve it.

General Banking Law Amendment
Candidate	Votes	%
Yes	1,564,746	65.84
No	811,981	34.16
Total votes	2,376,727	100
Turnout	{{{votes}}}	44.49%

Amendment results by county Yes: 80–90%; 70–80%; 60–70%; 50–60%; No: 50–60%

==== Revenue Amendment ====
The Revenue Amendment, a legislatively referred constitutional amendment, was put to a vote. It would have amended Sections 1, 2, 3, 9, 10, 12, and 13 of Article IX of the Illinois Constitution. It failed to meet either threshold for passage.

Revenue Amendment
Option	Votes	% of votes on referendum	% of all ballots cast
Yes	1,642,549	53.38	41.81
No	1,434,330	46.62	36.51
Total votes	3,076,879	100	78.32
Voter turnout	57.60%		

Amendment results by county Yes: 60–70%; 50–60%; No: 60–70%; 50–60%

== Local elections ==
Local elections were held.
