= List of United States political families (Z) =

The following is an alphabetical list of political families in the United States whose last name begins with Z.

== The Zeidlers ==
- Carl Zeidler (1908–1942), Mayor of Milwaukee, Wisconsin 1940–42. Brother of Frank P. Zeidler.
- Frank P. Zeidler (1912–2006), candidate for U.S. Representative from Wisconsin 1946, Mayor of Milwaukee, Wisconsin 1948–60; candidate for President of the United States 1976; Chairman of the Socialist Party USA. Brother of Carl Zeidler.
  - Jeanne Zeidler, Mayor of Williamsburg, Virginia 1998–2010. Daughter of Frank P. Zeidler.

== The Zimmermans ==
- Fred R. Zimmerman (1880–1954), Wisconsin Assemblyman 1909–10, delegate to the Republican National Convention 1916 1920 1924 1940 1944, Wisconsin Secretary of State 1923–27 1939–54, Governor of Wisconsin 1927–29, candidate for Governor of Wisconsin 1934. Father of Robert C. Zimmerman.
  - Robert C. Zimmerman (1910–1996), Wisconsin Secretary of State 1957–75. Son of Fred R. Zimmerman.
