= 1946 Cook County, Illinois, elections =

Elections were held in Cook County, Illinois, on November 5, 1946. Republicans took control of most county offices and occupied both seats of the Board of Appeals, although Democrats retained their majority in the Board of Commissioners. The Republican landslide reflected similar trends in state and federal elections at the time but was nevertheless unexpected. It resulted in the resignation of Democratic leader Edward Joseph Kelly and ultimately the end of his tenure as Mayor of Chicago. Republicans failed to capitalize on this victory in the following year's Chicago mayoral election, which was won by Democrat Martin Kennelly.

Democrat Richard J. Daley was defeated for the position of Sheriff by Republican candidate Elmer Michael Walsh. This would be the only loss of his career; he later became the Chairman of the Cook County Democratic Party Central Committee and served as Mayor of Chicago from 1955 to 1976. After serving his term as Cook County Sheriff, Elmer Walsh returned to his law practice until his retirement.

== Election information ==
1946 was a midterm election year in the United States. The primaries and general elections for Cook County races coincided with those for House and those for state elections.

== Background ==
Patrick Nash, who had constructed a powerful political machine with Anton Cermak and served as Democratic Party chairman since 1931, died in 1943. Edward Joseph Kelly, who had been Mayor of Chicago since Cermak's inadvertent (Note: Cermak died from gunshot wounds intended for U.S. President-elect Franklin D. Roosevelt. Some claim that Cermak was the intended target, but this is generally discounted among historians.) assassination in 1933, assumed the chair. Kelly was an inadequate leader of both the party and municipal government, and received criticism for poor delivery of city services and allowing political appointments in the public school administration. Nevertheless, Democrats had been largely unopposed in the 1944 elections.

Offices that were contested included the Treasurer, Assessor, Sheriff, County Clerk, County Superintendent of Public Schools, County Judge, Judge and Clerk of the Probate Court, and the Clerk of the Criminal Court, as well as the President of the Board of Commissioners, both members of the Board of Appeals, and the other members of the Board of Commissioners. Excluding the President, 15 people were elected to the Board of Commissioners; ten representatives from the city of Chicago and five from the rest of the county.

== Primary elections ==
Primary elections were held on April 9. The primaries of both parties were generally considered uncompetitive. These were the first primaries in Illinois after World War II; both parties sought to include veterans on their tickets. Leaders of both parties exhorted supporters to attend the primaries.

=== Democratic primaries ===
Richard J. Daley, Cook County comptroller and an state senator who dealt with legislation related to Chicago on Kelly's behalf, ran for the Democratic nomination for Sheriff. This came as a surprise to some given Daley's reputation for integrity and the notoriety of the Sheriff's office for improper collections of money from motorists and suburban adult establishments. The position was term-limited to one term, and most officeholders used the opportunity to collect money. Daley had never previously run for office outside of his Senate district, and appealed to Kelly for his relative obscurity and lack of previous scandals, something which was uncommon among Democrats of the time.

=== Republican primaries ===
Evanston Township had an unexpected three-way contest for Republican party committeeman, with incumbent Alan E. Ashcraft Jr. being challenged by Evanston alderman Robert E. James and Benjamin F. E. Ricker. Ashcraft survived the challenge and was named Vice President of the Republican Country Towns Organization of Cook County in May.

== General election ==
The general election was held on November 5. Harriet M. Robinson, the president of the Honest Ballot Committee, called for the Federal Bureau of Investigation to investigate the election on October 20, accusing the Board of Election commissioners of delaying the release of precinct voter registers.

The results were a landslide for the GOP. Only three Democrats—Edmund K. Jarecki for County Court Judge, Michael J. Flynn for County clerk, and John S. Clark for Assessor—retained countywide office. The results mirrored similar pro-Republican trends at the state and federal level but were unexpected by either party.

=== Sheriff ===
Daley was the favorite to win the position of Sheriff. "We were delighted that Dad was a candidate. Daley seemed almost impossible to beat, but it was an honor just to be named to run against him," recalled Walsh's son Elmer Jr. However, Daley suffered from the general tide against the Democrats while Walsh benefited from being a veteran of World War II.

=== Courts ===
Jarecki, who had been the County Judge since 1922, had such a narrow margin of victory that it was possible that he might have lost as of November 8, and ultimately had a margin of victory of only 8,873 votes in what was the closest election.

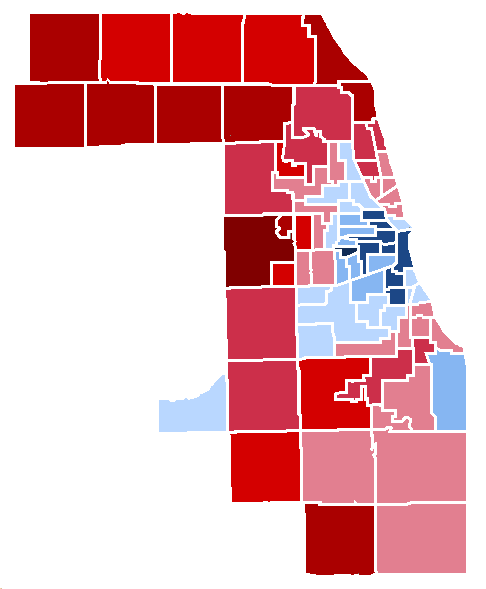
Results of the probate judge election.

Republican candidate William Waugh won the Probate Court Judgeship, defeating the Democratic opponent John F. O'Connell.

== Aftermath and legacy ==
The elections proved to be Kelly's downfall. Jacob Arvey, a Democratic west side boss who had returned from the war, convinced him to resign as chairman. In the following year's Chicago mayoral election Kelly was replaced by Martin Kennelly as the Democratic candidate.

The shrieval race would be Daley's only electoral defeat. Daley became the Chairman of the Cook County Democratic Party Central Committee in 1953 and the Mayor of Chicago in 1955, serving both positions until his death in 1976. Walsh served as Sheriff until 1950 but faded from relevance, dying in 1962.

The Probate Court, Criminal Court, and County Court were abolished in 1964 upon the formation of the Circuit Court of Cook County to unify the courts of Cook County into a single jurisdiction. Countywide voting for the Board of Commissioners ended in 1994 when districts were established to elect each commissioner. The Board of Appeals was replaced by a three-member Board of Review in 1998.

== Works cited ==
- Royko, Mike (1971). Boss: Richard J. Daley of Chicago. New York, New York: Signet.
