= Rockefeller-Aldrich family political line =

- George Aldrich (1605–1683), an immigrant from England, settled in Mendon, Massachusetts Bay Colony, in the mid 17th century.
- William Aldrich (1820–1885), U.S. Representative from Illinois 1877–1883, Wisconsin Assemblyman 1859. Cousin of Nelson W. Aldrich.
  - James Franklin Aldrich (1853–1933), U.S. Representative from Illinois 1893–1897. Son of William Aldrich.
- Nelson W. Aldrich (1841–1915), U.S. Senator from Rhode Island 1881–1911. (Chairman of Senate Finance Committee), U.S. Representative from Rhode Island 1879–1881, Rhode Island State Representative 1875–1877, Cousin of William Aldrich.
  - Richard S. Aldrich (1884–1941), Rhode Island State Representative 1915–1916, Rhodes Island State Senator 1917–1918, U.S. Representative from Rhode Island 1923–1933, delegate to the Republican National Convention 1924. Son of Nelson W. Aldrich.
  - Winthrop W. Aldrich (1885–1974), U.S. Ambassador to Great Britain 1953–1957. Son of Nelson W. Aldrich.
    - Nelson Aldrich Rockefeller (1908–1979), Vice President of the United States 1974–1977. Governor of New York 1959–1973, delegate to the Republican National Convention 1960 1964, candidate for the Republican nomination for President of the United States 1960 1964 1968 1976, Nephew of Richard S. Aldrich and Winthrop W. Aldrich.
    - Winthrop Rockefeller (1912–1973), Republican National Committeeman 1961, delegate to the Republican National Convention 1964, candidate for Governor of Arkansas 1964, Governor of Arkansas 1967–1971, candidate for the Republican nomination for President of the United States 1968. Nephew of Richard S. Aldrich and Winthrop W. Aldrich.
    - Richard S. Aldrich, candidate for U.S. Representative from New York 1962, New York City Councilman. Son of Richard S. Aldrich.
    - Charles H. Percy (September 27, 1919 – September 17, 2011), delegate to the Republican National Convention 1960, candidate for Governor of Illinois 1964, U.S. Senator from Illinois 1967–1985, candidate for the Republican nomination for President of the United States 1968 1976. Father-in-law of John D. Rockefeller IV.
      - John D. Rockefeller IV (1937-2026), West Virginia House Delegate 1967–1968, West Virginia Secretary of State 1969–1972, candidate for Governor of West Virginia 1972, Governor of West Virginia 1977–1985, U.S. Senator from West Virginia 1985–2015, delegate to the Democratic National Convention 2000 2004. Nephew of Nelson A. Rockefeller and Winthrop Rockefeller.
      - Winthrop Paul Rockefeller (1948–2006), Lieutenant Governor of Arkansas 1996–2006, candidate for the Republican nomination for Governor of Arkansas 2006, withdrew nomination. Son of Winthrop Rockefeller.
      - Mark Dayton (born 1947), candidate for U.S. Senate from Minnesota 1982, Auditor of Minnesota 1991–1995, U.S. Senator from Minnesota 2001–2007, delegate to the Democratic National Convention 2004, Governor of Minnesota 2011–2019. Former brother-in-law of John D. Rockefeller, IV (Dayton divorced from Alida Rockefeller 1986).

NOTE: John D. Rockefeller IV and Winthrop Paul Rockefeller are also former third cousins by marriage of U.S. Senator William Proxmire.

Ray Zirkelbach (Born 1978) - Iowa House of Representatives. Descendant of George Aldrich.

== See also ==
- Rockefeller family
- List of United States political families
