= Harris Rowe =

American politician (1923–2013)

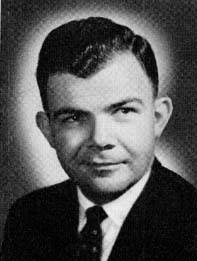
- official portrait, 1961

Member of the Illinois House of Representatives from the 49th district
- In office 1961–1967

Jacksonville, Illinois Alderman
- In office ???

Personal details
- Born: November 10, 1923 Jacksonville, Illinois, U.S.
- Died: September 8, 2013 (aged 89) Jacksonville, Illinois, U.S.
- Party: Republican
- Spouse: Alice Mary Crabtree (m. 1954; died 2012)
- Parent: Richard Yates Rowe (father)
- Education: Illinois College; Northwestern University School of Law

Military service
- Allegiance: United States
- Branch/service: Army Air Forces
- Battles/wars: World War II

Frederick Harris Rowe (November 10, 1923 – September 8, 2013) was an American politician, businessman, and lawyer who served as a Republican member of the Illinois House of Representatives. In 1966, he ran unsuccessfully as his party's nominee for Illinois state treasurer.

== Early life, military service, education, and career ==
Rowe was born in 1923 in Jacksonville, Illinois. His father was Richard Yates Rowe who served as Illinois state treasurer and Illinois secretary of state and who unsuccessfully sought the Republican nomination for governor in 1952. Rowe graduated from Jacksonville High School. He then served in the United States Army Air Forces during World War II. He thereafter received his bachelor's degree from Illinois College and his law degree from Northwestern University School of Law.

Rowe was admitted to the Illinois Bar in 1950, practicing law in Jacksonville as well as working for his family's insurance company. He became an executive at the company. He also was president of the local Kiwanis Club, chairman of the Morgan County Polio Foundation.

== Political career ==
A Republican, he entered politics and served as an alderman (city councilor) on the Jacksonville City Council for eight years, and became chairman of the Morgan County Republican Central Committee. He also was president of the local Kiwanis Club, chairman of the Morgan County Polio Foundation.

Rowe served in the Illinois House of Representatives from 1961 to 1967, being one of three representatives from Illinois' 49th district.

Rowe was the Republican candidate for Illinois state treasurer in 1966, narrowly losing to Adlai Stevenson III by 39,655 votes out of 3.7 million votes cast.

== Personal life and death ==
Rowe married his wife, Alice Mary Crabtree, on December 22, 1954. They both had four daughters, Sally, Mary, Millie, and Julie.

Rowe was a member of Jacksonville's First Presbyterian Church. He was a freemason, as well as a member of the Benevolent and Protective Order of Elks, American Legion, and AMVETS.

Rowe died in Jacksonville, Illinois, at the age of 89.

Party political offices
Preceded by William J. Scott	Republican nominee for Illinois Treasurer; 1966	Succeeded by Edmund J. Kucharski
