= Richard Yates Rowe =

American politician and businessman

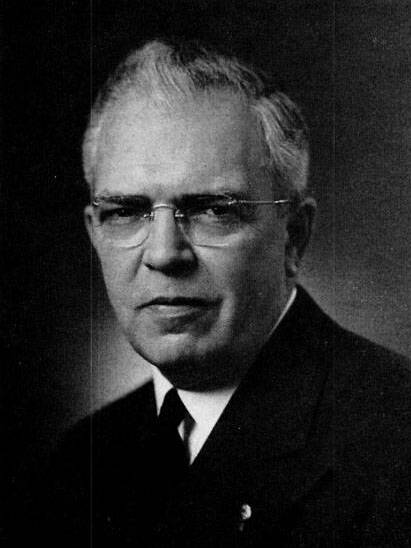
- Official portrait, circa 1947

54th Treasurer of Illinois
- In office January 13, 1947 – January 10, 1949
- Governor: Dwight H. Green
- Preceded by: Conrad F. Becker
- Succeeded by: Ora Smith

27th Secretary of State of Illinois
- In office June 8, 1944 – January 1945
- Governor: Dwight H. Green
- Preceded by: Edward J. Hughes
- Succeeded by: Edward J. Barrett

Personal details
- Born: December 12, 1888; Jacksonville, Illinois, U.S.
- Died: March 19, 1973 (aged 84); Jacksonville, Illinois, U.S.
- Political party: Republican
- Children: Harris Rowe (son)

Richard Yates Rowe (December 12, 1888 – March 19, 1973) was an American politician and businessman.

== Biography ==
Born in Jacksonville, Illinois, Rowe served in the United States Navy during World War I. He received his bachelor's degree from University of Illinois at Urbana–Champaign. He worked in the insurance and newspaper businesses. Rowe was a Republican. In 1944, Rowe was appointed Illinois Secretary of State to fill a vacancy and then in 1946 was elected Illinois State Treasurer. His son was Harris Rowe who served in the Illinois House of Representatives. Rowe died in Jacksonville, Illinois on March 19, 1973.

== Notes ==
Party political offices
Preceded by Conrad F. Becker	Republican nominee for Illinois Treasurer; 1946	Succeeded by Elmer Droste
Preceded by Hugh W. Cross	Republican nominee for Lieutenant Governor of Illinois; 1948	Succeeded by John William Chapman
