= Political families of the United States =

Many families in the United States have produced multiple generations of politicians who have had a significant influence on government and public policy in their communities, states, and nationally.

== Geographic distribution ==
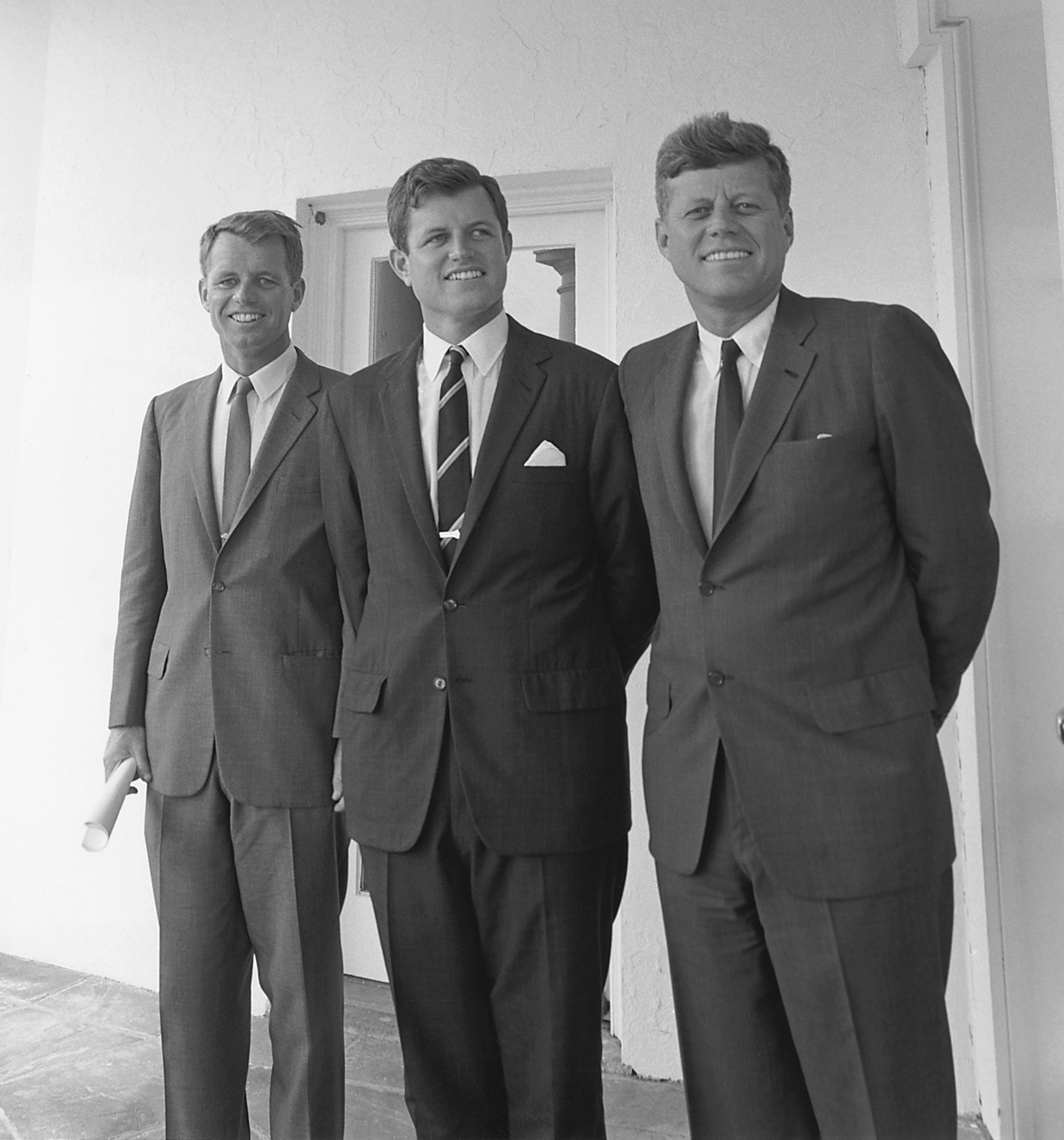
Three brothers from the Kennedy political family: Robert, and Edward, and John Kennedy pictured together in August 1963.

Grandfather–grandson presidents

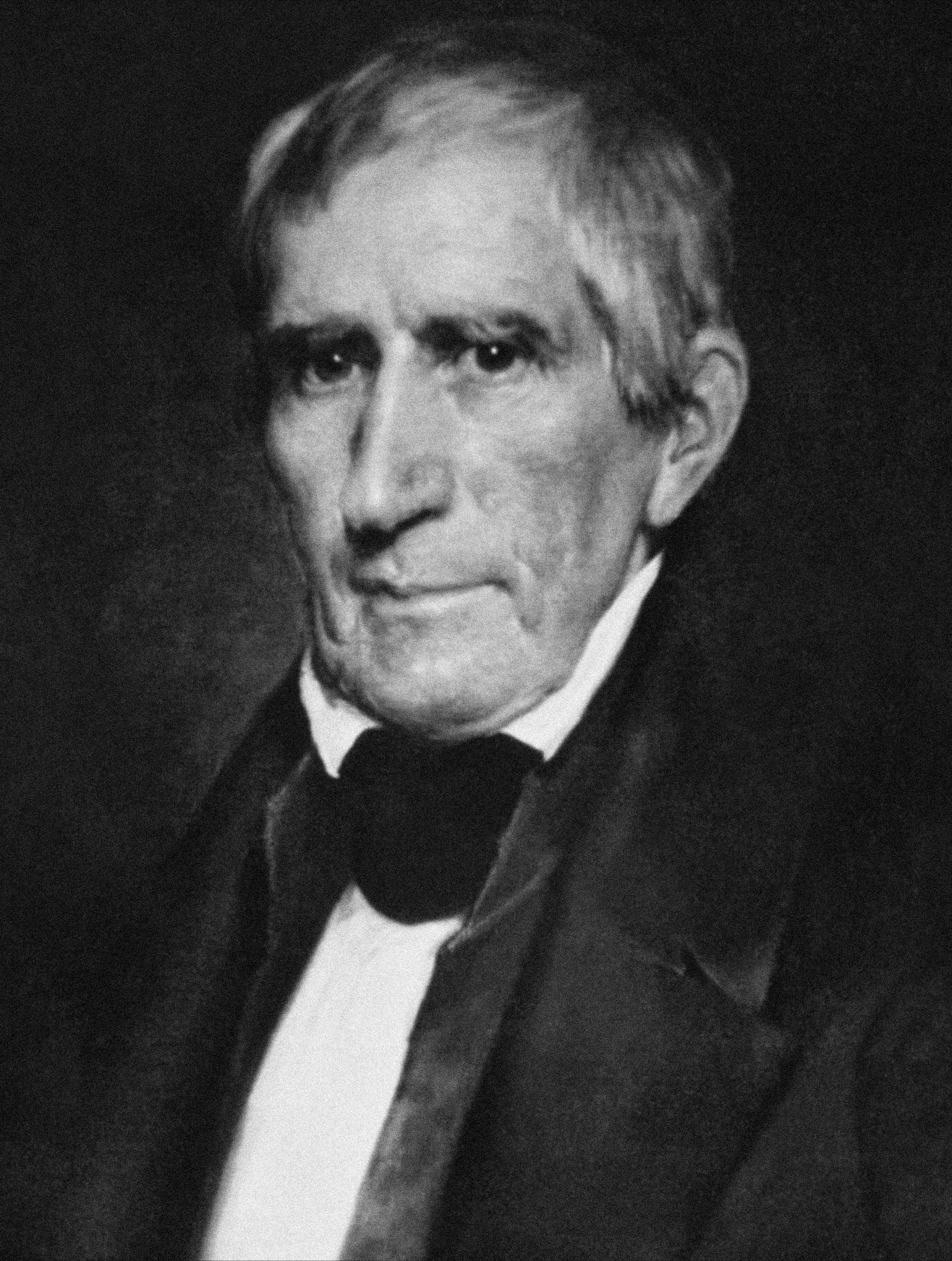
President William Henry Harrison

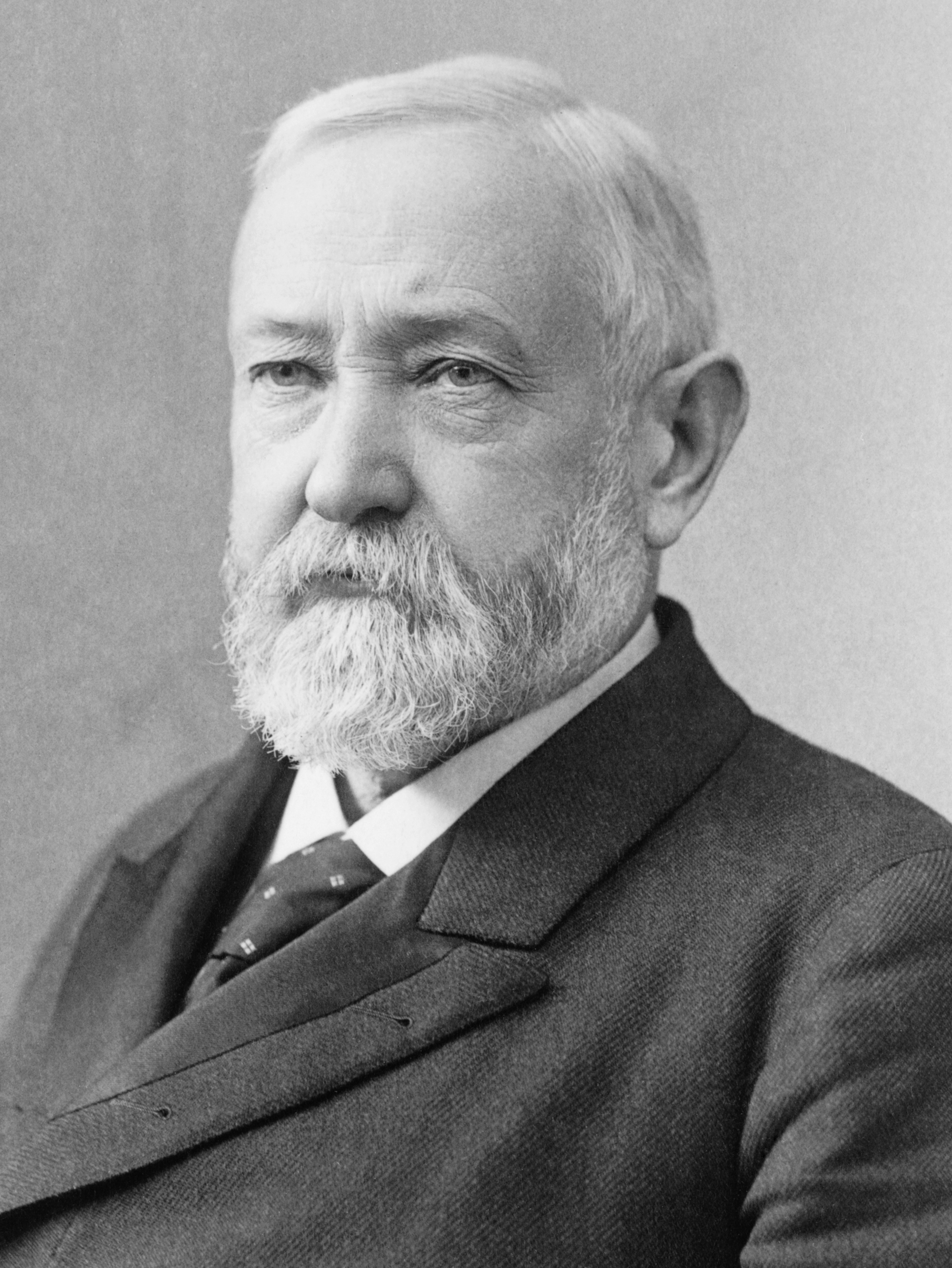
President Benjamin Harrison

Many of these families moved to national prominence from a single state or region, for example: the Huntingtons of Connecticut, the Longs of Louisiana, the Harrisons and Lees of Virginia, the Roosevelts of New York, the Daleys and the Stevensons of Illinois, the Muhlenbergs of Pennsylvania, the Tafts of Ohio, the Frelinghuysens of New Jersey, the Lodges of Massachusetts and the DuPonts of Delaware.

The Adams family come prominently from Massachusetts and is one of the main political dynasties in United States history. It includes two presidents (the second and the sixth), a Secretary of the Navy, an ambassador to the United Kingdom during the Civil War and multiple other high profile functions.

Other families are or have been politically involved in multiple states. The Bush family includes two presidents (one a former Vice President, the other a former governor of Texas), a senator from Connecticut, and a governor of Florida. The Kennedy family included a president, an attorney general, a senator from Massachusetts, and an ambassador to Ireland in a single generation. Other members have been elected to public office in New York, Rhode Island, Connecticut, Maryland, and California, and served in appointed positions such as United States Secretary of Health and Human Services Robert F. Kennedy Jr. (2025–).

Members of the Rockefeller family have been elected to public office in New York, West Virginia and Arkansas.

The Udall family first became prominent in Arizona, but three cousins from the most recent generation served in the U.S. Senate from Colorado, New Mexico, and Oregon.

== Partisan leanings ==
In 2000, Newsweek magazine observed that there are as many, if not more, Democratic political families as there were Republican "dynasties". This may be attributable to the Democratic Party being 26 years older than the Republican Party.

== Alphabetical list ==
- A
- B
- C
- D
- E
- F
- G
- H
- I
- J
- K
- L
- M
- N
- O
- P
- Q
- R
- S
- T
- U
- V
- W
- X
- Y
- Z

== See also ==
- List of political families
