= Conrad F. Becker =

American businessman and politician (1905–1965)

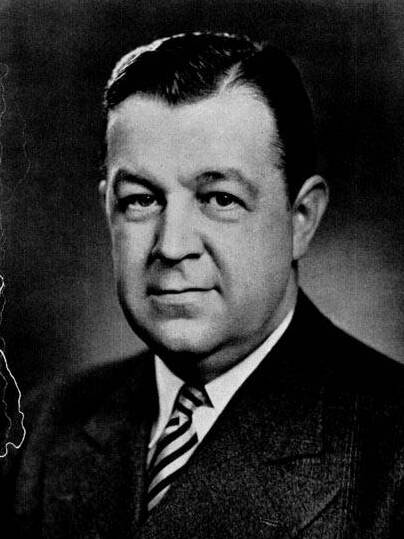
- Becker, circa 1945

53rd Treasurer of Illinois
- In office January 8, 1945 – January 13, 1947
- Governor: Dwight H. Green
- Preceded by: William Stratton
- Succeeded by: Richard Yates Rowe

Personal details
- Born: November 12, 1905 Red Bud, Illinois, U.S.
- Died: August 14, 1965 (aged 59) New Haven, Missouri, U.S.
- Party: Republican

Conrad F. Becker (November 12, 1905 – August 14, 1965) was an American businessman and politician.

Born in Red Bud, Illinois, Becker worked in his family's business C. Becker Milling Company. He was also involved with the banking business. Becker played baseball with semi-pro baseball teams in southern Illinois. He was offered a contract with the St. Louis Cardinals and of which he declined because of his involvement with his family's business. From 1937 to 1941, he served as Mayor of Red Bud, Illinois and was a Republican. From 1942 to 1944, Becker was the warden of the Southern Illinois Penitentiary in Menard, Illinois. From 1945 to 1947, Becker served as Illinois Treasurer. He died at his in-law's home in New Haven, Missouri in 1965.

== Notes ==
Party political offices
Preceded by William Stratton	Republican nominee for Illinois Treasurer; 1944	Succeeded by Richard Yates Rowe
