= Queensland Air Museum =

- Established: 1974
- Location: 7 Pathfinder Drive, Caloundra, Sunshine Coast, Queensland
- Coordinates: 26.7980°S 153.1096°E
- Type: Aerospace museum
- Website: https://www.qldair.museum

The Queensland Air Museum is a not-for-profit all-volunteer aviation museum located in the Caloundra Airport precinct in Queensland, Australia. Its mission is to collect and preserve all aspects of aviation heritage with an emphasis on Australia and Queensland and to display these for the enrichment of the public. The museum has the largest and most diverse collection of historic aircraft in Australia and it also has a large collection of aircraft engines, equipment, artefacts, photographs, uniforms and books.

In 2025, the museum was operated by 185 active volunteers, who contributed in excess of 38,000 hours of volunteer labour to the museum that year.

== History ==
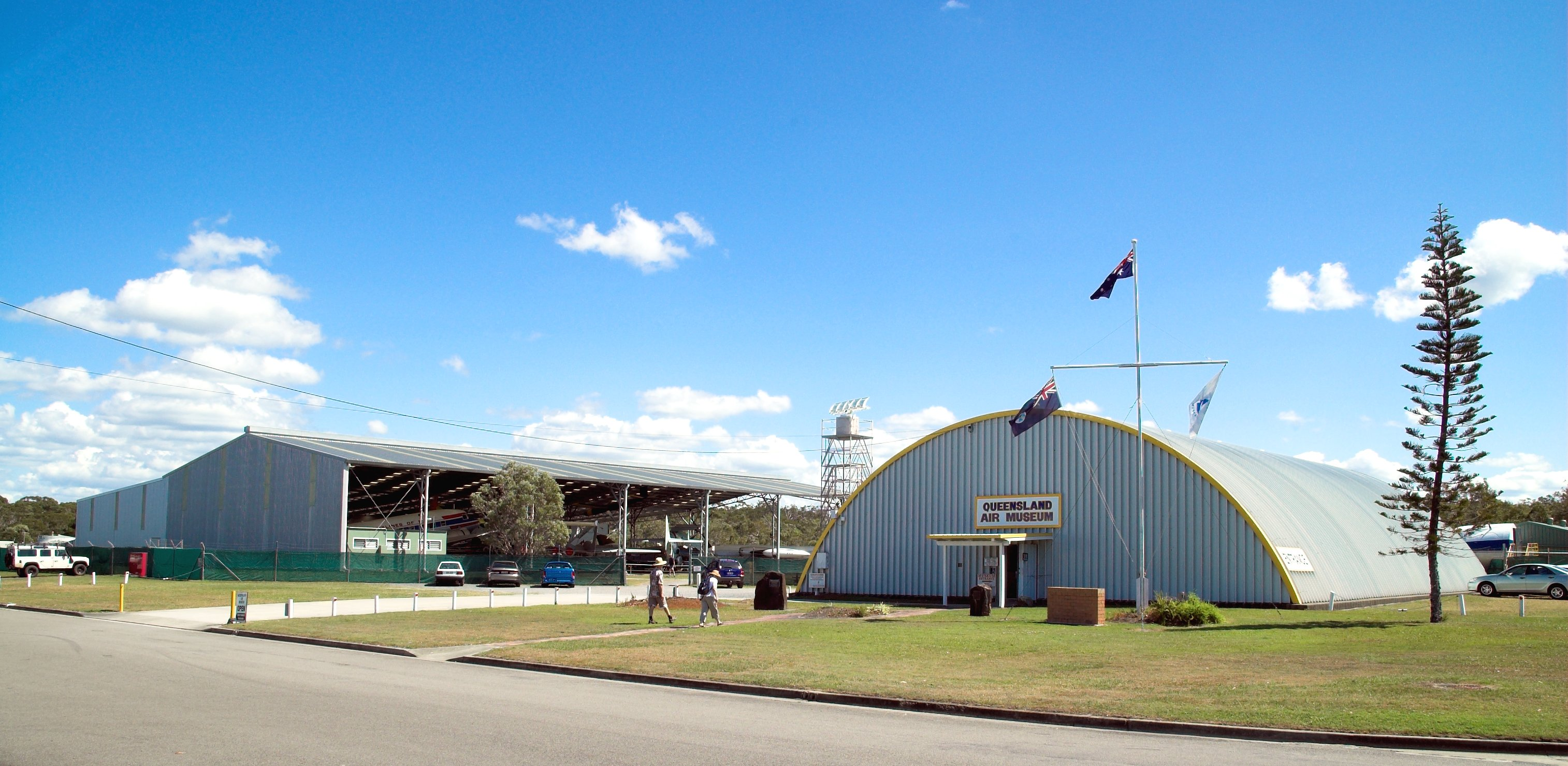
Queensland Air Museum, Pathfinder Dr., Caloundra

On 2 June 1974, the Queensland Air Museum was inaugurated with the official unveiling of a Canberra bomber (A84-225) that had been purchased from a Government disposal. The aircraft was moved by volunteers from RAAF Base Amberley to be displayed at the Pioneer Valley Park, a museum at Kuraby in Brisbane's southern suburbs. The park was eventually closed and the aircraft was moved to a leased site at Nudgee on the north side of Brisbane. The collection began to grow when a Meteor TT20 was donated to the museum by the British Government and a Vampire and two Sea Venoms were acquired.

Due to the construction of the new Brisbane Airport nearby, the collection was forced to move to a temporary holding area on the airport site. Exorbitant rental costs at this location eventually lead to the museum being evicted and the resultant publicity resulted in an offer of a permanent home on the Sunshine Coast by the Landsborough Shire Council (now Sunshine Coast Regional Council Division 1). On 14 June 1986, the collection was relocated to a site adjacent to Caloundra Aerodrome with a newly built hangar. The official opening of the museum took place on 4 April 1987 by Mrs Ly Bennett, museum patron and widow of the museum's patron, the late Air Vice-Marshal Don Bennett. Don Bennett was the Queensland-born founder and commander of the World War II Bomber Command Pathfinder Force. In honour of this, the road in front of the museum was named Pathfinder Drive.

Now with a permanent home, the collection continued to grow and in 1989, it was bolstered by an ambitious recovery expedition to Sentosa Island, Singapore where a Sea Vixen, Meteor and Hunter were purchased from a scrap metal dealer just days before their destruction. The aircraft were disassembled and successfully shipped to Australia, where they were restored and placed on display.

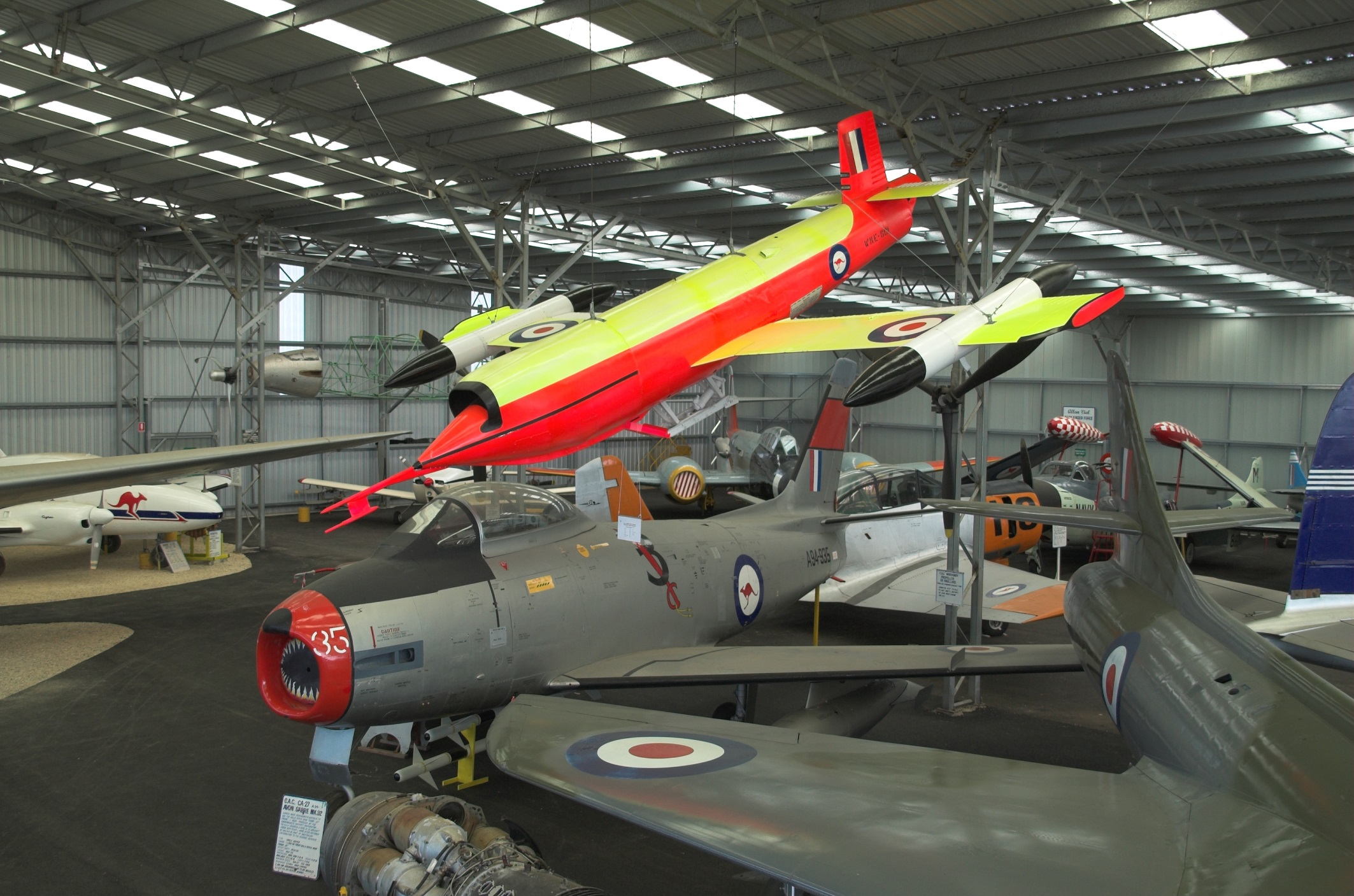
Queensland Air Museum Hangar 2 display

The two hectare museum site has been steadily developed with the construction of a second hangar being completed in July 2004, which was later extended in 2006. A library, restoration workshops and storage facilities have also been constructed. In September 2006, Mr Allan Vial, DFC OAM OPR (Pol), became patron of the Queensland Air Museum. He was also Life President of the Queensland Pathfinder Force Association in Australia.

A plan to relocate Caloundra Aerodrome placed an uncertain future on the museum for many years. On 2 September 2010, the Queensland Premier Anna Bligh announced in Parliament that the airport would continue to operate on its present site and she said this would provide "certainty for the iconic air museum". The museum's situation further improved when the Sunshine Coast Regional Council granted the museum a 30-year lease extension and on 28 March 2013, a Caloundra Aerodrome Master Plan was adopted. The Plan recognised the museum's tourism potential and its importance as a heritage organisation.

In August 2013, former Australian Defence Force Chief of Air Force, Air Marshal Geoff Shepard AM (retd.) became the patron of the museum. Upon his retirement, Air Vice-Marshal Julie Hammer AM (retd,) became QAM patron in August 2023.

In 2024, the museum celebrated 50 years of operation and took the opportunity to develop a Strategic Plan 2024-2030 which includes a Jubilee Infrastructure Master Plan. This ambitious plan seeks to completely redevelop the infrastructure on site to ensure that the collection can best be preserved for the next 50 years. The redevelopment brief takes into consideration the provision of expanded safe, climate-controlled facilities to cater for the collection, the volunteer workforce and the 25,000 visitors who come through the museum each year.

== Aircraft collection ==
The museum's aircraft collection is made up of a large variety of aircraft types that represent many aspects of aviation.

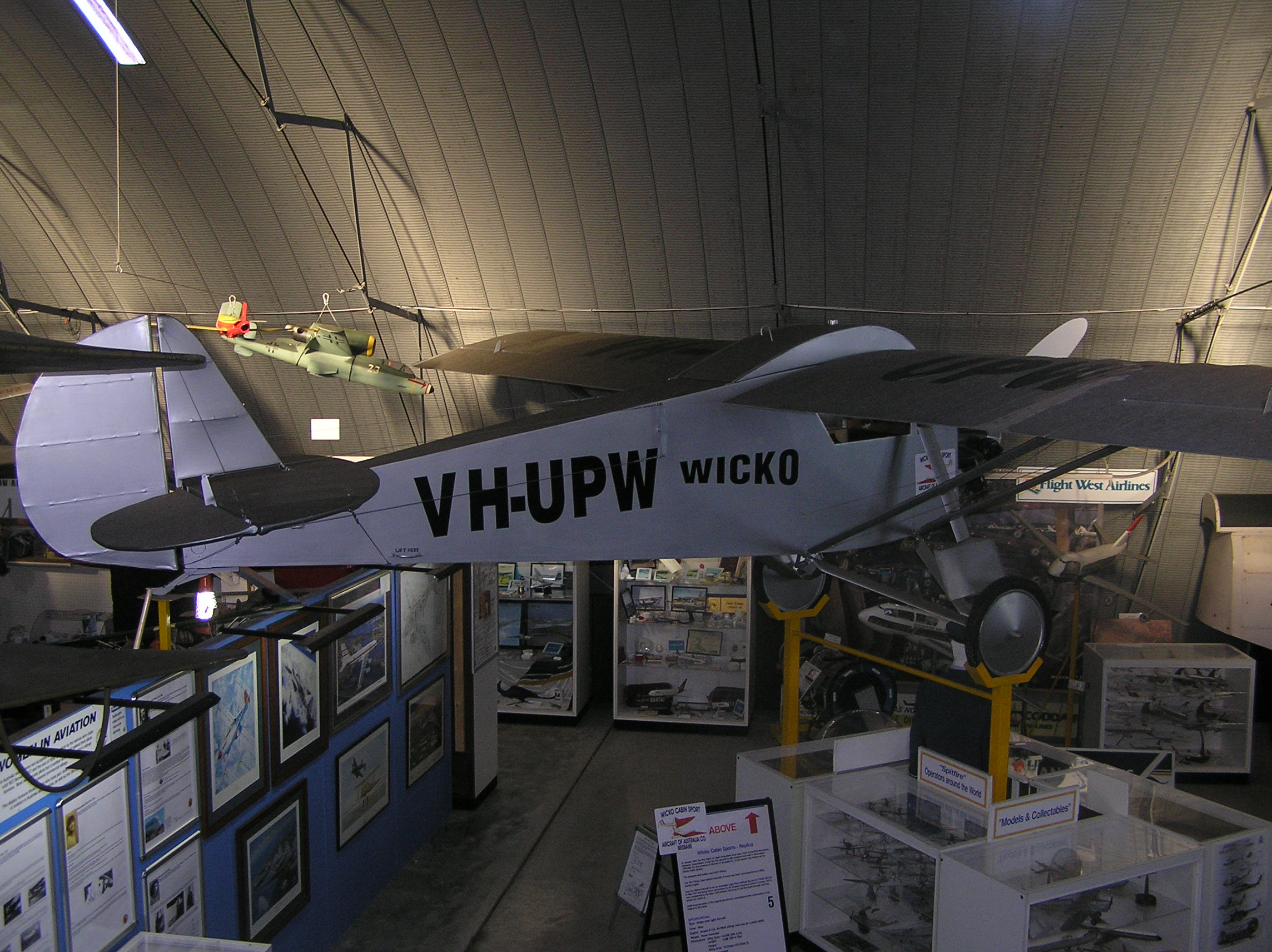
Wicko Cabin Sports VH-UPW replica at the Queensland Air Museum

Military aircraft represent the Royal Australian Air Force (RAAF), Royal Australian Navy (RAN), Australian Army, Royal Air Force (RAF), Royal Navy (RN), Republic of Singapore Air Force and Polish Air Force. Passenger aircraft types represent Australian and Papua New Guinean airlines, such as Ansett Airlines, Trans Australia Airlines, Bush Pilots Airways, Queensland Airlines, Queensland Pacific Airways, Airlines of NSW, Airlines of Tasmania, Ansett-MAL and Mandated Airlines.

Australian designed or produced aircraft are represented by Commonwealth Aircraft Corporation Wirraway, Winjeel and Sabre, de Havilland Drover and Vampire, Government Aircraft Factories Jindivik, Turana and Canberra, Kingsford Smith Aviation Service Cropmaster, Transavia Airtruk, Victa Airtourer and Calair Skyfox.

Other aircraft represent agricultural aircraft, training aircraft, helicopters, naval aircraft and de Havilland Aircraft Company types.

=== Wicko Cabin Sports VH-UPW replica ===
The first powered aircraft to be designed and built in Queensland was the Wicko Cabin Sports. It was a wood and fabric monoplane designed and built by Geoff Wikner and it first took to the air in January 1931 from Archerfield Airport in Brisbane. The Queensland Air Museum obtained copies of the original plans of this significant aircraft and constructed a replica, which went on display at the museum in 2007.

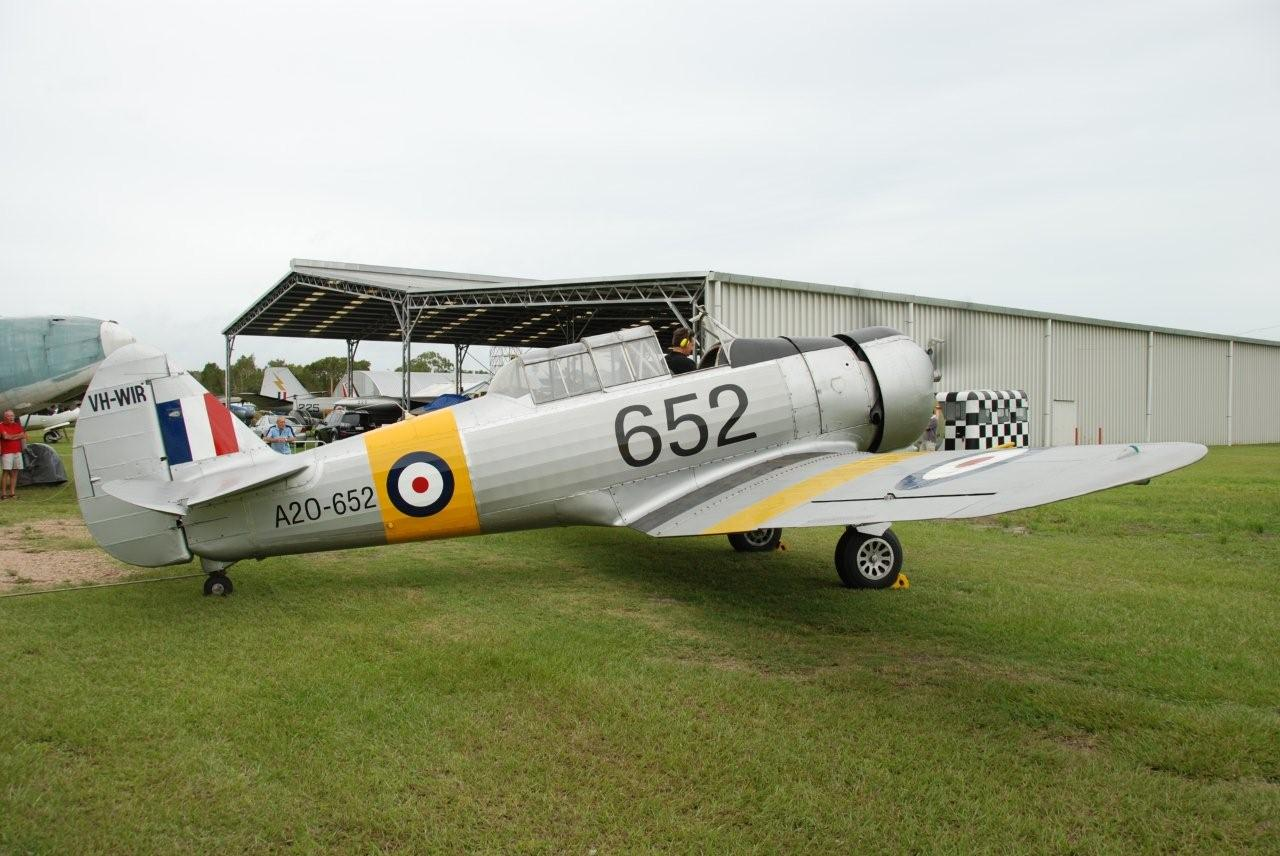
CA-16 Wirraway Mk.III A20-652 undertaking an engine run at the Queensland Air Museum

=== CAC Wirraway A20-652 ===
The Commonwealth Aircraft Corporation's Wirraway has been described as the aircraft that established a viable Australian aircraft industry. The Wirraway was essentially a license built North American NA-16 which was simplified to suit Australian industrial capacity & capabilities of the time, and manufactured between 1939 and 1946. With 755 manufactured, it is the second most produced aircraft type in Australia. Deliveries to the RAAF began just months before the outbreak of World War II and they served in New Guinea, the Solomon Islands and Borneo areas against the Japanese in tactical reconnaissance, target marking, dive bombing and army co-operation roles. They were also used by the RAAF as an advanced trainer throughout the war and for many years after with their retirement from service in 1958.

The example in the Queensland Air Museum collection is A20-652 construction number 1104. It was built in July 1944 in the final production batch which had the designation of CA-16. The museum purchased the aircraft with a grant from the John Villiers Trust in October 2010. It was flown from Adelaide, South Australia to Caloundra and placed on display in a flyable condition. The aircraft is maintained to preserve it in an operational condition and it is run in the regular Operation Engine Collection public displays.

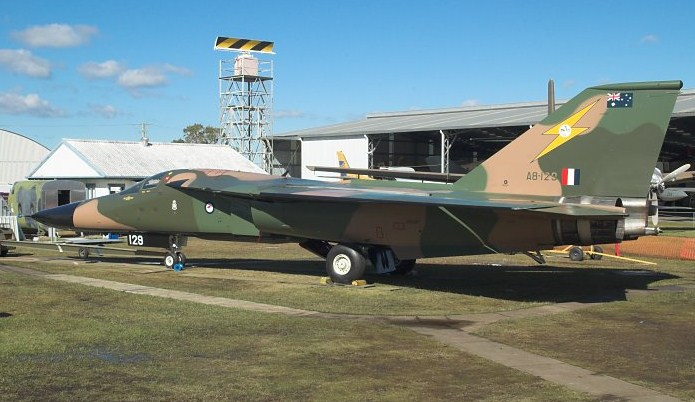
RAAF F-111C A8-129 at the Queensland Air Museum

=== General Dynamics F-111C A8-129 ===
The F-111 aircraft was the RAAF's premier strike asset for 37 years until the type's retirement in December 2010. It was operated by 1 and 6 Squadrons for all of that time from the RAAF Base Amberley near Ipswich, Queensland. The aircraft had the ability to perform a "dump and burn" which involved dumping fuel from an outlet between the engine jet pipes and igniting it with the engine's afterburners. The spectacular flame produced was popular at air shows, sporting events and firework displays, such as the annual Brisbane River Fire firework show and the 2000 Sydney Olympics closing ceremony.

The Queensland Air Museum has F -111C aircraft A8-129 on display, which is on long-term loan from the RAAF. This aircraft was in the first group to arrive in Australia on 1 June 1974 and it also flew in the final operational flight of the type on 3 December 2010. The aircraft is painted in its delivery camouflaged colour scheme with 1 Squadron markings on one side and 6 Squadron on the other.

== Engine collection ==
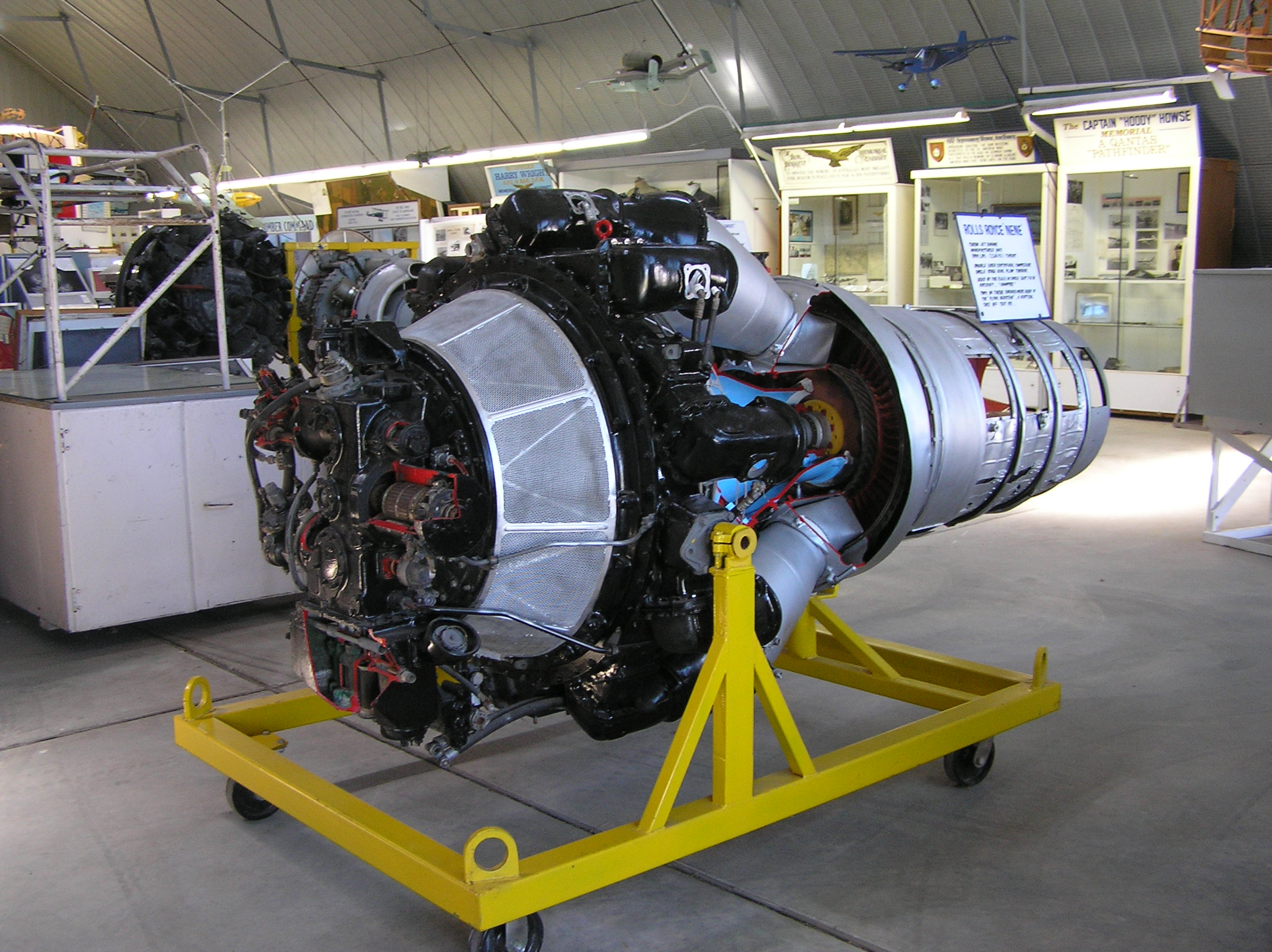
A sectioned Rolls-Royce Nene centrifugal compressor turbojet engine

The museum has a large collection of aircraft engines many of which are displayed on stands beside the aircraft. They include piston engines, turbojets and turboprop types.

The piston engines on display include radial types such as the Pratt & Whitney types R-1340 Wasp, R-1830 Twin Wasp, R-2000 Twin Wasp and R-2800 Double Wasp, Bristol Hercules 634, Armstrong Siddeley Cheetah IX, Wright R-975 Whirlwind and Wright R-3350 Turbo Compound Cyclone. Other piston types include the Allison V-1710, Rolls-Royce Merlin 102 and de Havilland Gipsy Queen and Gipsy Major.

The turbojet collection has some early centrifugal compressor designs such as the de Havilland Goblin and Ghost and the Rolls-Royce Nene and Derwent. Other turbojet types include the Rolls-Royce Avon and Armstrong Siddeley Viper. The turboprop engines are represented by the Rolls-Royce Dart, Pratt & Whitney Canada PT6 and Armstrong Siddeley Double Mamba.

The museum also has an Operational Engine Collection, which has a number of engines mounted on running rigs, that are run in regular public displays. They include a range of piston engine types ranging from a 40 horsepower four cylinder Continental A40 up to a 1,450 horsepower fourteen cylinder Pratt & Whitney R-2000 Twin Wasp radial.

== Displays ==
The museum collection has many displays which highlight the aviation history of Australia, Queensland and the local Sunshine Coast. These include Charles Kingsford Smith, Women in Aviation, Pathfinder Force, Korean War, Vietnam War, British Pacific Commonwealth Airlines, Ansett Airlines, Qantas, Calair, The Flight Data Recorder and the Royal Flying Doctor Service.

=== Royal Flying Doctor Service ===
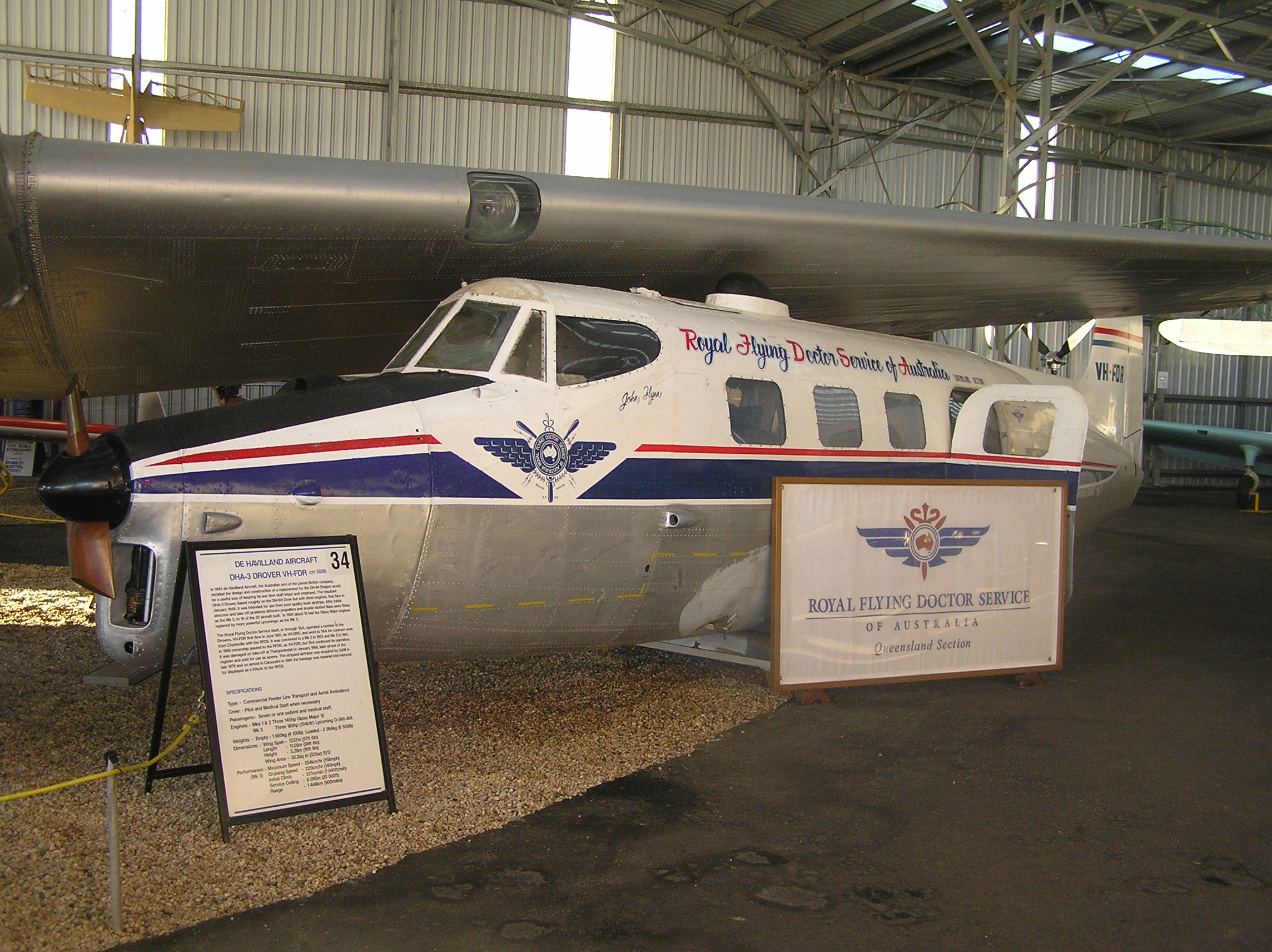
RFDS DHA-3 Drover Mk.3 VH-FDR John Flynn

An important part of the development of the remote Australian inland area has been the Royal Flying Doctor Service (RFDS), which provides medical support to isolated communities. The Australian Inland Mission Aerial Medical Service, which would later become the RFDS, was established by Reverend John Flynn on 15 May 1928 in Cloncurry, Queensland. Flynn had a vision to use radios and aircraft to connect doctors and patients in remote locations. He engaged Alfred Traeger to develop suitable two-way radios which used a pedal generator to provide reliable power and the service took flight using a de Havilland DH-50 aircraft leased from Qantas which is another Queensland icon. The RFDS continues to operate a fleet of over 60 aircraft across every State of Australia. The Queensland Air Museum's RFDS display includes a DHA-3 Drover aircraft used by the RFDS and an example of a Traeger radio. The Drovers, VH-FDR named John Flynn after the founder and VH-FDS named Norman Bourke, were used by the Queensland Section between 1951 and 1968.

=== Calair Skyfox ===
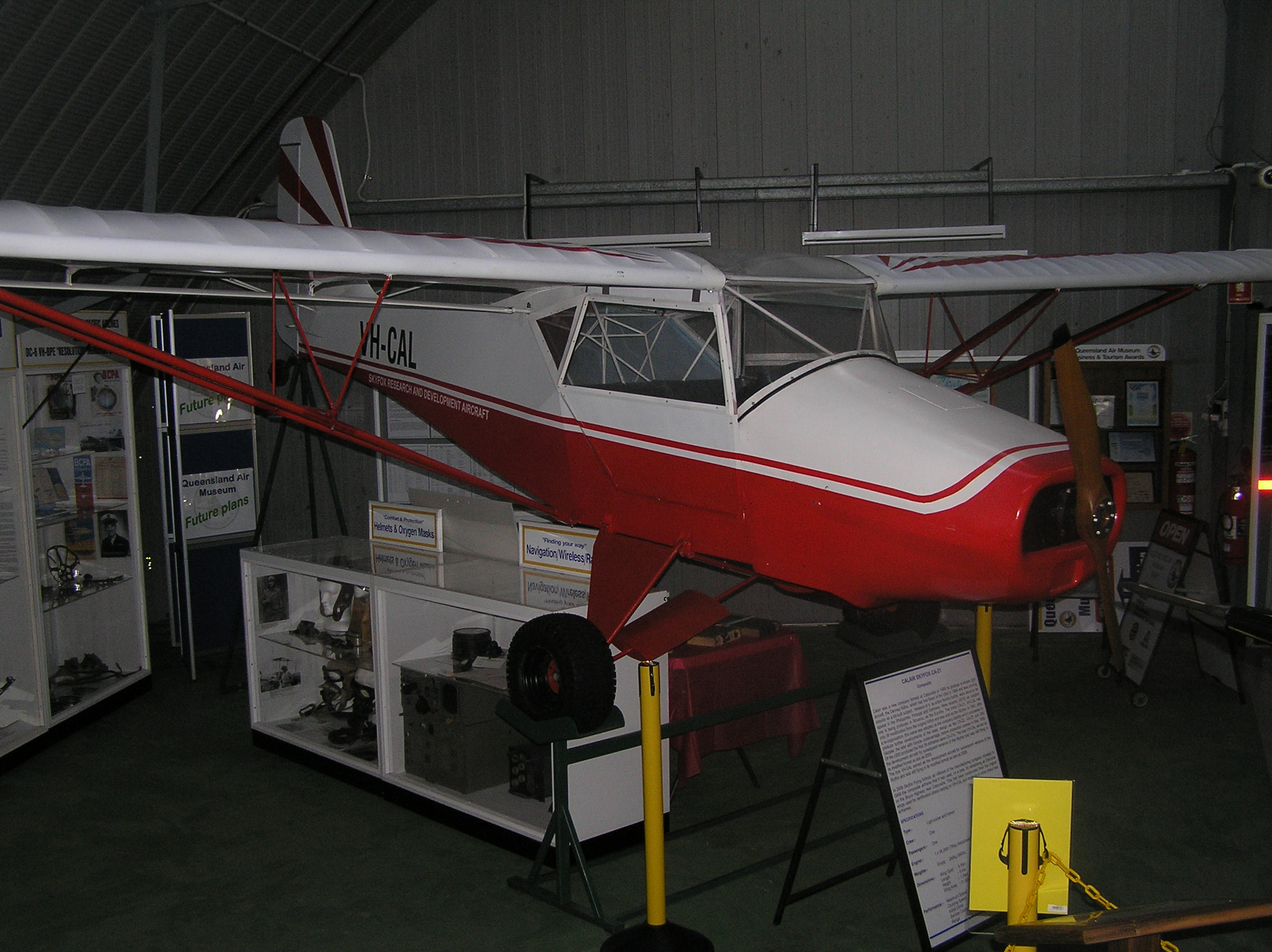
Calair CA21 Skyfox VH-CAL at the Queensland Air Museum

As a tribute to the local aircraft producer Calair Corp / Skyfox Aviation the museum has a major display, which features a CA21 Skyfox aircraft representing the prototype VH-CAL. This aircraft is restored using parts from several Skyfox aircraft with the wing being from the original aircraft. Calair Corporation was created in October 1989 to produce a derivative of the Denny Kitfox at Caloundra Airport. The aircraft, to be known as the Calair CA21 Skyfox, was a two-seat high-wing monoplane with a tail wheel undercarriage for use in the training and recreational flying market. A number of changes were made to the Kitfox design to increase the loaded weight, which brought it up to the Australian CAO 101-55 standard. This allowed it to be commercial produced and be used for general aviation pilot training and it was the first aircraft in Australia to be so certified. It was powered by a 2.1L, 58.2 kW (78 hp) Aeropower engine built in Perth, Western Australia, which was essentially a Volkswagen adaptation. 33 CA21s were produced between July 1990 and August 1991.

In 1991, the company was sold and the name was changed to Skyfox Aviation Ltd. Production then switched to the CA22 which incorporated numerous changes including a change to a Rotax 912 engine. A total of 61 were produced at which time it gained certification under the European Joint Airworthiness Requirements for Very Light Aircraft (JAR/VLA), the first Australian aircraft to do so. The next 10 aircraft produced after the certification in June 1993 were designated CA25.

The final stage in the development of the Skyfox was the production of a model with tricycle landing gear to better cater for the pilot training market. This was called the CA25N Gazelle and would take over the production run. A total of 66 would be completed before production ceased in May 1998, when the company was placed under voluntary administration due to financial difficulties.

=== Pathfinder Force ===
During World War II, the British Bomber Command was engaged in night time area bombing of Germany. In 1942, these operations were resulting in an aircraft loss rate of between 4 and 5 percent and only a third of the aircraft were able to drop their bombs within 5 miles (8 km) of the target. In an effort to improve the accuracy the Pathfinder Force was created on 15 August 1942, under the leadership of Acting Group Captain Don Bennett, who was born in Toowoomba. The specialised squadrons in the Pathfinder Force had aircraft that were crewed by experienced crews who would lead the main bomber force to locate the target and mark it with flares. This would give the bomber force coming in behind an improved chance of dropping their bombs in the right place. To commemorate the Pathfinder Force the museum has a large display, which was established and maintained in conjunction with the Pathfinder Force Association of Australia. It includes uniforms, memorabilia, models and a reproduction of Don Bennett's office which contains many of his original possessions. The display is located adjacent to the F-111 strike aircraft which provides a link to the modern air force.

== Aircraft on display ==
As of January 2024.

1. Auster J/5G Autocar, VH-BYP
2. Auster J/5B Autocar, VH-KCL
3. Avions Max Holste MH.1521M Broussard, VH-HFA
4. Anson Mk 1, VH-BIF
5. Anson Mk 1, MG222
6. Beagle B.206-S, VH-UNL
7. Beech C18S, VH-CLG
8. Beech E18S, N3781B
9. Beech P35 Bonanza, VH-AWC
10. Beech 65 Queen Air, VH-FDV
11. Beech 200 Super King Air, VH-FII
12. Beech 2000A Starship, N786BP
13. Bell UH-1H Iroquois, A2-310, Australian Army
14. Bell 206B-1 Kiowa, A17-012, Australian Army
15. Bensen B-8M Gyrocopter
16. Bristol Bloodhound Mk.I
17. Bristol Scout D, 8976, AFC (replica)
18. Broome Lebeau, 10-0046
19. Calair CA21 Skyfox, VH-CAL
20. Cessna 336 Skymaster, VH-CMY, ANSETT-MAL
21. Cessna 402A, VH-DZY, Bush Pilots Airways
22. Chrislea CH.3 Super Ace, VH-BRO
23. Commonwealth Aircraft Corporation CA-6 Wackett KS-3 Cropmaster, VH-AJH
24. Commonwealth Aircraft Corporation CA-16 Wirraway Mk.III, A20-652, RAAF
25. Commonwealth Aircraft Corporation CA-18 Mustang Mk. 23, A68-201, RAAF (replica)
26. Commonwealth Aircraft Corporation CA-25 Winjeel, A85-410, RAAF
27. Commonwealth Aircraft Corporation CA-27 Sabre Mk.31, A94-935, RAAF
28. Commonwealth Aircraft Corporation CA-28 Ceres, VH-CEU, cockpit only
29. de Havilland DH-82A Tiger Moth, VH-BKS
30. de Havilland DH-100 Vampire F Mk.30, A79-476, RAAF
31. de Havilland DH-104 Dove Mk.1, VH-MAL Rai, Mandated Airlines
32. de Havilland DH-112 Sea Venom FAW Mk.53, WZ898, RAN
33. de Havilland DH-112 Sea Venom FAW Mk.53, WZ910, RAN (stored)
34. de Havilland DH-110 Sea Vixen FAW Mk.2, XJ490, RN
35. de Havilland DH-110 Sea Vixen FAW Mk.2, XJ607, RN (nose section)
36. de Havilland DH-114 Heron 2D/A1, VH-KAM, Airlines of Tasmania
37. de Havilland DH-115 Vampire T Mk. 35A, A79-828, RAAF
38. de Havilland DHA-3 Drover Mk.3, VH-FDR John Flynn, Royal Flying Doctor Service
39. de Havilland DHA-3 Drover Mk.3, VH-FDS Norman Bourke, Royal Flying Doctor Service
40. de Havilland Canada DHC-1 Chipmunk T Mk.10, VH-RVV, Royal Victorian Aero Club
41. de Havilland Canada DHC-4 Caribou, A4-173, RAAF
42. de Havilland Canada DHC-4 Caribou, A4-159, RAAF (nose section)
43. Douglas DC-3-194B, VH-ANR, Ansett Airlines of NSW
44. Fairey Gannet AS Mk.1, XA331, RAN
45. Fokker F.27 Friendship Mk.400, VH-FNQ, Ansett Airlines
46. General Dynamics F-111C, A8-129, RAAF
47. Government Aircraft Factories Canberra B Mk.20, A84-225, RAAF
48. Government Aircraft Factories Jindivik Mk.3B, WRE-601
49. Government Aircraft Factories Mirage IIIO(FA), A3-16
50. Government Aircraft Factories N22B Nomad, VH-BFH
51. Government Aircraft Factories Turana, P1-019
52. Gloster Meteor F Mk.8, WA880, RAF (painted as RAAF A77-721)
53. Armstrong Whitworth Meteor TT Mk. 20, WD647, RAF
54. Grumman S-2A Tracker, 133160
55. Hawker Hunter F Mk.4, XF311, RAF
56. Hawker Hunter FGA Mk. 74BS, 533, Republic of Singapore Air Force
57. ICA-Brasov IS-28M, VH-GRK
58. ICA-Brasov IS-29D, VH-GWC
59. International Model Aircraft Towed Glider Mk.2, Identity unknown
60. Kawasaki KH-4, VH-AHQ
61. Kawasaki KH-4, VH-HFZ
62. Lake LA-4-200 Buccaneer, VH-EJX
63. Lea Kestrel Kermit, 10-001
64. Link Trainer D4-282
65. Lockheed PV-1 Ventura, A59-96, RAAF
66. Lockheed SP-2H Neptune, A89-277, RAAF
67. Lockheed AP-3C Orion, A89-760, RAAF
68. Mohawk 298, VH-HIX, Queensland Pacific Airways
69. Piaggio P.166, VH-BHK, (painted as Queensland Airlines VH-PQA)
70. Pilatus PC-6 Porter, A14-705, Australian Army (nose section only)
71. Piper PA23-250 Aztec, VH-MBX, (painted as TAA Sunbird Services VH-TGP)
72. Piper PA25-235 Pawnee, ZK-CEL
73. Piper PA38-112 Tomahawk, VH-SCK
74. Pterodactyl Ascender II+, 10-0665
75. Rand Robinson KR-2, VH-XXS
76. Robinson R22 Beta, VH-SBQ
77. Robinson R44 Raven, VH-RMN (cockpit only)
78. Seabird Rouseabout Mk. 3, 10-0281
79. Seabird Sentinel, VH-SBI
80. Seabird Sentinel, VH-SBU
81. Sports Flight Skypup, (identity unknown)
82. Sud-Ouest SO-1221S Djinn, VH-INP, Ansett-ANA
83. Aerospatiale SA315B Lama, PK-ZHB
84. Swearingen SA-226 Metroliner II, VH-BPV, Bush Pilots Airways
85. Transavia PL-12 Airtruk, ZK-CWX
86. Vickers Viscount 756D, VH-TVJ, Trans-Australia Airlines (nose section)
87. Victa Airtourer 100, VH-CFE
88. Westland Wessex HAS MK.31A, N7-217, RAN
89. Wicko Cabin Sports, VH-UPW, (replica)
90. Winton Grasshopper, (identity unknown)
91. WSK Mielec SB Lim-2, 636, Polish Air Force

== See also ==
- List of aerospace museums
