= 2014 United States Senate election in New Mexico =

- November 4, 2014
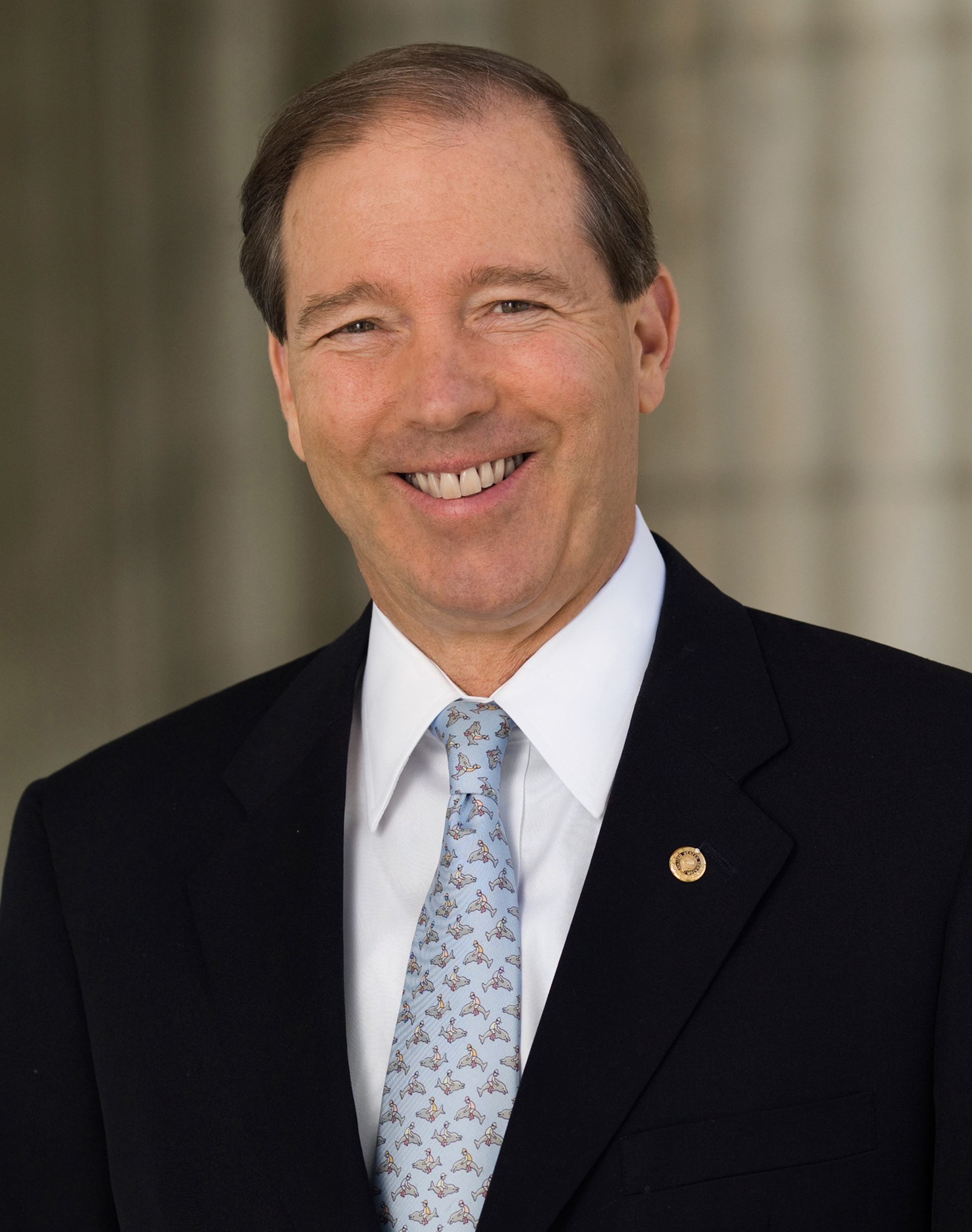

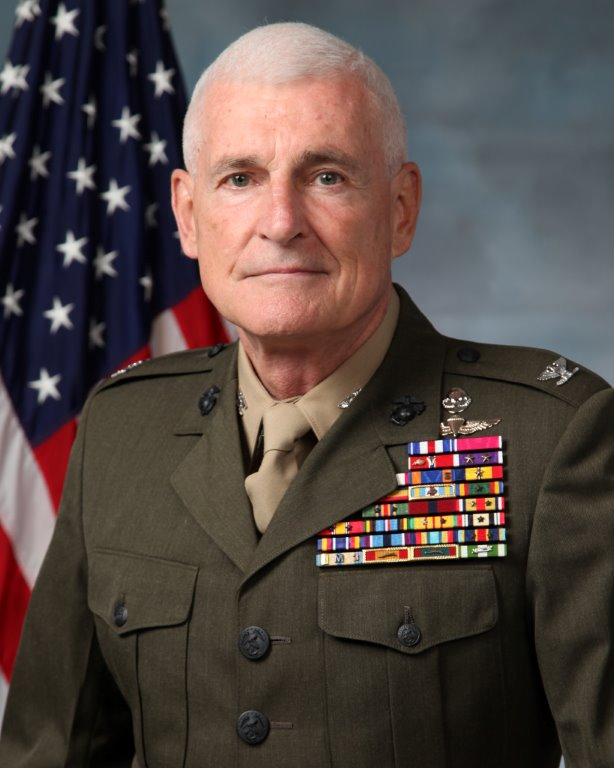
Nominee	Tom Udall	Allen Weh
Party	Democratic	Republican
Popular vote	286,409	229,097
Percentage	55.56%	44.44%
- Udall: 50–60% 60–70% 70–80% 80–90% Weh: 50–60% 60–70% 70–80%
U.S. senator before election
Tom Udall
Democratic
Elected U.S. Senator
Tom Udall
Democratic

The 2014 United States Senate election in New Mexico was held on November 4, 2014, to elect a member of the United States Senate. Incumbent Democratic Senator Tom Udall won reelection to a second term.

== Democratic primary ==
=== Candidates ===
==== Declared ====
- Tom Udall, incumbent U.S. senator

=== Results ===
Democratic primary results
Party	Candidate	Votes	%
Democratic	Tom Udall (incumbent)	113,502	100.00%
Total votes		113,502	100.00%

== Republican primary ==
=== Candidates ===
==== Declared ====
- David Clements, assistant district attorney and former chairman of the Doña Ana County Republican Party
- Allen Weh, businessman, former chairman of the New Mexico Republican Party and candidate for governor of New Mexico in 2010

==== Declined ====
- Robert Aragon, former state representative (running for state auditor)
- Jon Barela, secretary of the New Mexico Economic Development Department and nominee for New Mexico's 1st congressional district in 2010
- Richard J. Berry, mayor of Albuquerque
- Gary Johnson, former governor of New Mexico and Libertarian Party nominee for president of the United States in 2012
- John Sanchez, lieutenant governor of New Mexico (running for re-election)
- Heather Wilson, former U.S. representative, nominee for the U.S. Senate in 2012 and candidate for the U.S. Senate in 2008
Allen Weh

Individuals

- Mitt Romney, former governor of Massachusetts
- Mike Huckabee, former governor of Arkansas
- Richard J. Berry, mayor of Albuquerque, New Mexico

=== Results ===
Results by county: Weh: 50–60%; 60–70%; 70–80%; Clements: 50–60%; 60–70%

Republican primary results
Party	Candidate	Votes	%
Republican	Allen Weh	41,566	63.0%
Republican	David Clements	24,413	37.0%
Total votes		65,979	100.0%

== General election ==
=== Debates ===
- Complete video of debate, October 30, 2014 - YouTube

=== Predictions ===
Source	Ranking	As of
The Cook Political Report	Solid D	November 3, 2014
Sabato's Crystal Ball	Safe D	November 3, 2014
Rothenberg Political Report	Safe D	November 3, 2014
Real Clear Politics	Likely D	November 3, 2014

=== Polling ===
Poll source	Date(s) administered	Sample size	Margin of error	Tom Udall (D)	Allen Weh (R)	Other	Undecided
Public Policy Polling	March 20–23, 2014	674	± 3.8%	53%	33%	—	14%
Rasmussen	July 21–22, 2014	860	± 4%	54%	33%	3%	10%
CBS News/NYT/YouGov	July 5–24, 2014	930	± 3.6%	51%	44%	2%	4%
Research & Polling Inc.	August 12–14, 2014	606	± 4%	53%	35%	—	11%
CBS News/NYT/YouGov	August 18 – September 2, 2014	1,096	± 4%	54%	36%	2%	8%
Research & Polling Inc.	September 9–11, 2014	603	± 4%	51%	38%	—	11%
Rasmussen Reports	September 22–23, 2014	830	± 4%	52%	39%	—	9%
CBS News/NYT/YouGov	September 20 – October 1, 2014	1,093	± 4%	53%	35%	2%	10%
Gravis Marketing	September 27 – October 1, 2014	727	± 4%	53%	36%	—	11%
Vox Populi Polling	October 20–22, 2014	614	± 3.95%	51%	45%	—	6%
CBS News/NYT/YouGov	October 16–23, 2014	962	± 6%	52%	36%	1%	11%
Research & Polling Inc.	October 21–23, 2014	614	± 4%	50%	43%	—	8%

Hypothetical polling

Poll source	Date(s) administered	Sample size	Margin of error	Tom Udall (D)	David Clements (R)	Other	Undecided
Public Policy Polling	March 20–23, 2014	674	± 3.8%	55%	33%	—	12%

=== Results ===
United States Senate election in New Mexico, 2014
Party	Candidate	Votes	%	±%
Democratic	Tom Udall (incumbent)	286,409	55.56%	−5.77%
Republican	Allen Weh	229,097	44.44%	+5.77%
Total votes		515,506	100.00%	N/A
Democratic hold				

==== By county ====
County	Tom Udall Democratic		Allen Weh Republican		Margin		Total votes cast
County	#	%	#	%	#	%	Total votes cast
Bernalillo	97,760	57.0%	73,751	43.0%	24,009	14.0%	171,511
Catron	543	32.0%	1,156	68.0%	-613	-36.0%	1,699
Chaves	4,183	32.2%	8,801	67.8%	-4,618	-35.6%	12,984
Cibola	3,638	64.0%	2,045	36.0%	1,593	28.0%	5,683
Colfax	2,394	56.0%	1,878	44.0%	516	12.0%	4,272
Curry	2,412	30.1%	5,612	69.9%	-3,200	-39.8%	8,024
De Baca	321	41.0%	462	59.0%	-141	-18.0%	783
Doña Ana	23,111	56.0%	1,8150	44.0%	4,961	12.0%	41,261
Eddy	4,044	34.9%	7,545	65.1%	-3,501	-30.2%	11,589
Grant	5,323	57.9%	3,863	42.1%	1,460	15.8%	9,186
Guadalupe	1,378	75.2%	455	24.8%	923	50.4%	1,833
Harding	260	50.4%	256	49.6%	4	0.8%	516
Hidalgo	784	54.0%	667	46.0%	117	8.0%	1,451
Lea	2,360	25.9%	6,739	74.1%	-4,379	-48.2%	9,099
Lincoln	2,131	34.6%	4,035	65.4%	-1,904	-30.8%	6,166
Los Alamos	4,434	55.6%	3,534	44.4%	900	11.2%	7,968
Luna	2,467	50.8%	2,388	49.2%	79	1.6%	4,855
McKinley	11,334	76.5%	3,481	23.5%	7,853	53.0%	14,815
Mora	1,528	72.3%	585	27.7%	943	44.6%	2,113
Otero	4,609	36.1%	8,158	63.9%	-3,549	-27.8%	12,767
Quay	1,125	41.9%	1,557	58.1%	-432	-16.2%	2,682
Rio Arriba	7,665	75.4%	2,503	24.6%	5,162	50.8%	10,168
Roosevelt	1,254	33.1%	2,531	66.9%	-1,277	-33.8%	3,785
San Juan	11,904	39.6%	18,137	60.4%	-6,233	-20.8%	30,041
San Miguel	6,199	77.1%	1,842	22.9%	4,357	54.2%	8,041
Sandoval	20,140	52.0%	18,558	48.0%	1,582	4.0%	38,968
Santa Fe	37,657	76.7%	11,418	23.3%	26,239	53.4%	49,075
Sierra	1,575	42.6%	2,120	57.4%	-545	-14.8%	3,695
Socorro	3,137	59.3%	2,152	40.7%	985	18.6%	5,289
Taos	8,698	81.1%	2,026	18.9%	6,672	62.2%	10,724
Torrance	1,999	43.2%	2,624	56.8%	-625	-13.6%	4,623
Union	505	36.6%	874	63.4%	-369	-26.8%	1,379
Valencia	9,537	50.9%	9,194	49.1%	343	1.8%	18,731
Totals	286,409	55.6%	229,097	44.4%	57,312	11.2%	515,506

Counties that flipped from Democratic to Republican

- Quay (largest city: Tucumcari)
- Torrance (largest city: Moriarty)

==== By congressional district ====
Udall won two of three congressional districts.

District	Udall	Weh	Representative
1st	56.69%	43.31%	Michelle Lujan Grisham
2nd	46.98%	53.02%	Steve Pearce
3rd	61.31%	38.69%	Ben Ray Luján

== See also ==
- 2014 United States Senate elections
- 2014 United States elections
- 2014 New Mexico gubernatorial election
