= Seabird Seeker =

Australian light observation aircraft

Seeker
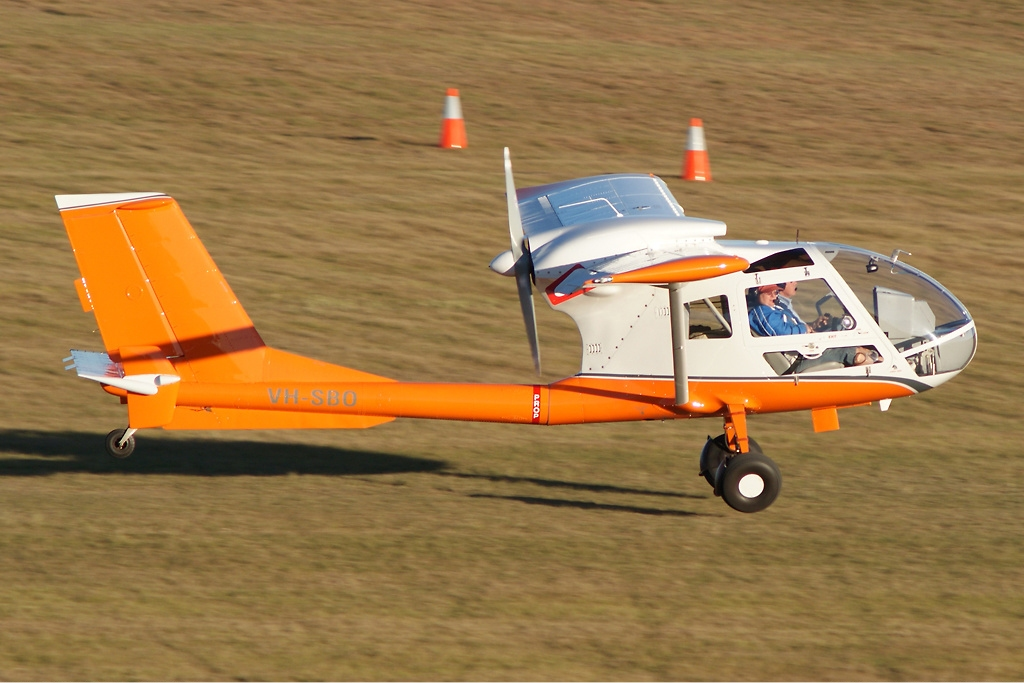
- Seeker at Bundaberg Airport

General information
- Type: Light observation monoplane
- National origin: Australia
- Manufacturer: Seabird Aviation Australia/Jordan; Seeker Aviation Australia
- Primary user: Royal Jordanian Air Force

History
- First flight: 1 October 1989 (SB5)

The Seabird Seeker is a light observation aircraft built originally by Seeker Aviation Australia and Seabird Aviation Jordan. Since 2016 it has been manufactured in the US by Seeker Aircraft (US)/Erickson. It is powered by a Lycoming O-360 engine. The aircraft is marketed as a low cost alternative to observation helicopters for the military and civilian sectors. It can be used in roles such as pipeline inspection, coast watch, environmental duties, aerial photography and security. The Seabird Seeker has had some export success, and is operated by the Iraqi Air Force.

As of 2016 Seekers are currently flying in Australia, Jordan, Azerbaijan, South Africa, Tanzania, UAE, and the US with the New Mexico State Police, among other operators.

== US acquisition and manufacture ==
In March 2014 Seeker Aircraft (US), a subsidiary of the global aviation company CSI Aviation, acquired Seabird Aviation, the Australian manufacturer of the Seabird Seeker, with plans to eventually move Australia-based manufacturing operations to the United States In March 2016 Seeker Aircraft (US) announced that Erickson Inc. of Portland, Oregon, would begin manufacturing the Seeker aircraft in the United States In the US the Seeker aircraft has FAA Part 23 Normal Category certification, allowing use for commercial operations.

== Operational history ==
Two SB7L-360A Seekers were purchased by the United States in 2004 in response to an initial requirement for eight fixed wing observation aircraft to equip the new Iraqi Air Force under the command of the Coalition Provisional Authority. The aircraft were received into service on 29 July from Seabird Aviation Jordan, and from 7 August Iraqi pilots received initial training on the Seekers. The two aircraft were airlifted by the United States Air Force to Basrah Airport on 18 August. The post-invasion IqAF's first flying squadron, No. 70 Reconnaissance Squadron was raised to operate the Seekers on patrol missions to monitor critical infrastructure such as oil pipelines and electricity transmission assets, as well as national borders. Initial missions saw coalition personnel accompany Iraqi pilots in a training capacity. On September 15, the Iraqi Air Force flew its first solo mission, crewed by two Iraqi pilots to provide intelligence on an oil pipeline spill. Although further procurement of the type did not eventuate after the selection of the SAMA CH2000, Seekers YI-101 and YI-102 continued to operate throughout the conflict successfully, providing capabilities, including real-time feeds of observations to ground forces, night surveillance and carrying digital video equipment to assist with target identification. The Seekers remained in service when the squadron relocated to Talil Air Base in 2010.

== Variants ==
SB7L-235
Initial prototype equipped with Lycoming O-235. Only one aircraft built.
SB7L-360A
Lycoming O-360 powered production variant.
SB7L-360A-2
Lycoming IO-390 210 hp variant
SB7L-360A-3 ROAMES
Short for Remote Observation Automated Modelling Economic Simulation. Two Lycoming IO-390-A1B6 powered variants built for Ergon Energy featuring upgraded avionics, Garmin G500 EFIS cockpit. The aircraft is capable of fully automated flight, with the pilot able to intervene at any time. Marketed by Seabird as a transitional "optionally piloted" aircraft as an alternative to Unmanned Aerial Vehicles.

== Operators ==
=== Civil ===
Australia

- Ergon Energy - Two Seeker ROAMES variants used for geospatial modeling.

Ghana

- Ghana Police Service - Were believed to be operating 4 Seekers in 2015, which were acquired from South Africa.

South Africa

- South African National Parks - A Seeker aircraft is used to patrol the Krueger National Park to prevent Rhinoceros poaching.

United States

- New Mexico State Police - Seeker Aircraft America donated one aircraft for law enforcement duties. As of 2014, under the agreement, this Seeker is used to demonstrate real-world applications to potential buyers.

=== Military ===
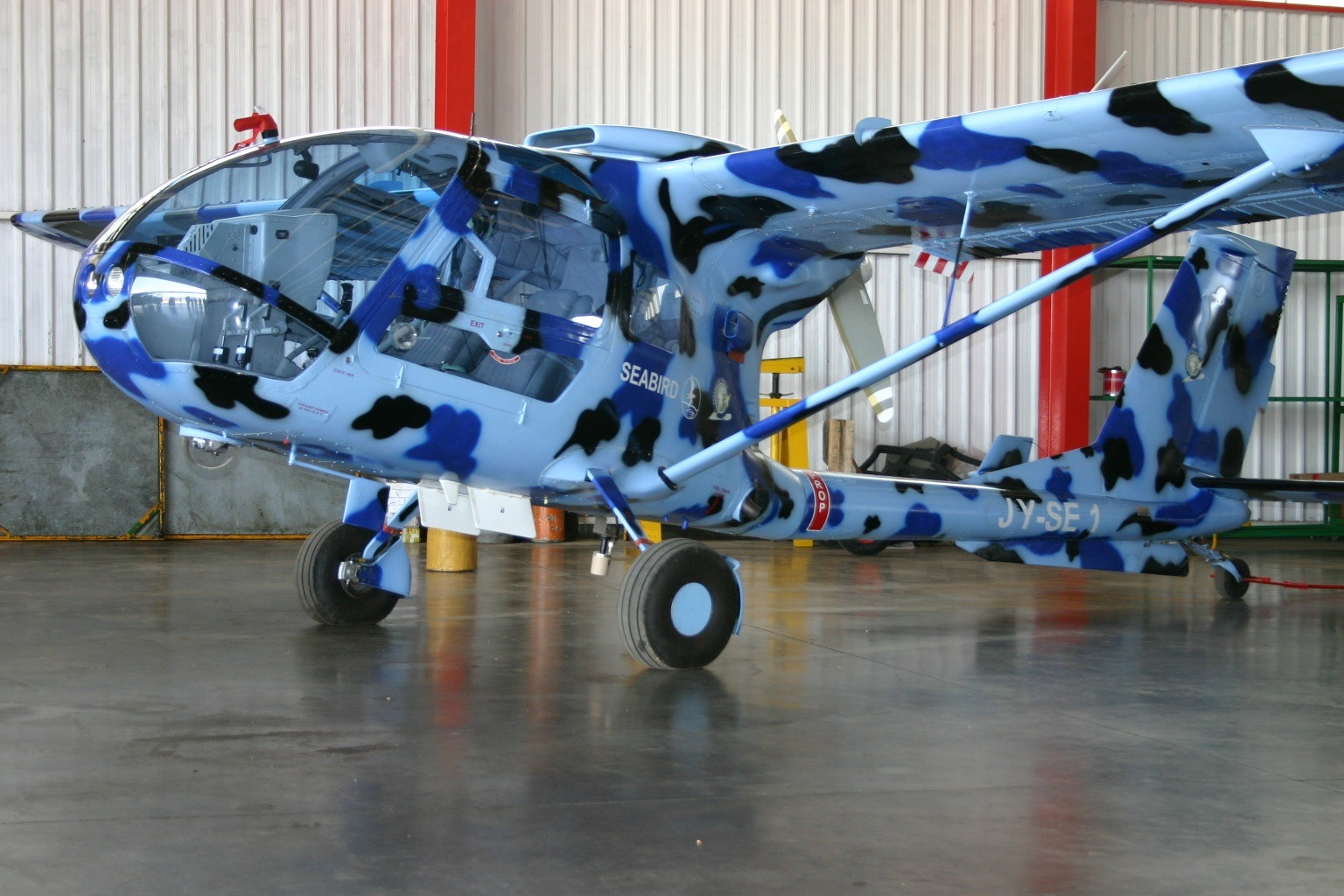
Jordanian Seeker

Iraq

- Iraqi Air Force - Two aircraft delivered in 2004.

Jordan

- Royal Jordanian Air Force - 6 Seekers operated in reconnaissance role.

Tanzania

- Tanzania Air Force Command - An unconfirmed number of Seekers (believed to be between 1 and 4) are operated by the Tanzania Air Force Command. The aircraft are equipped with an electro-optical/infrared (EO/IR) sensor turret for intelligence, surveillance and reconnaissance missions.

Yemen

- Yemeni Border Guards - Acquisition of 12 Seekers as part of an assistance package from the United States, used for border protection duties to prevent drug and arms smuggling, as well as illegal border crossings by terrorist militants.

== Specifications (Seabird Seeker ER SB7L-360A) ==
Data from

General characteristics

- Crew: 2
- Length: 23 ft 0 in (7.01 m)
- Wingspan: 36 ft 4 in (11.07 m)
- Height: 8 ft 2 in (2.49 m)
- Wing area: 141 sq ft (13.1 m^{2})
- Aspect ratio: 9.36:1
- Empty weight: 1,301 lb (590 kg)
- Gross weight: 1,997 lb (897 kg)
- Powerplant: 1 × Lycoming O-360-B2C , 160 hp (119 kW)

Performance

- Cruise speed: 129 mph (202 km/h, 112 kn)
- Range: 517 mi (832 km, 449 nmi)
- Endurance: 6.9 hours

Armament

- 2 × underwing hardpoints
- 2 Rocket pods (/ rockets each)
- 2 12.2 gun pods

== See also ==
Aircraft of comparable role, configuration, and era

- Edgley Optica
- Republic RC-3 Seabee
