= United States Senate Environment and Public Works Subcommittee on Children's Health and Environmental Responsibility =

The U.S. Senate Environment and Public Works Subcommittee on Children's Health was a subcommittee of the U.S. Senate Committee on Environment and Public Works.

== Jurisdiction ==
According to the Committee's website:

Responsibility for policy issues in connection with protection of pregnant women, infants and children from environmental hazards.

== Members, 112th Congress ==
The subcommittee is chaired by Democrat Tom Udall of New Mexico, and the Ranking Minority Member is Republican Lamar Alexander of Tennessee.

Majority	Minority
Tom Udall, New Mexico, Chairman; Sheldon Whitehouse, Rhode Island; Kirsten Gillibrand, New York	Lamar Alexander, Tennessee, Ranking Member; David Vitter, Louisiana
