= Skyfox =

Skyfox can refer to:

- Aero L-39 Skyfox Czech jet trainer
- Boeing Skyfox trainer aircraft
- IAR-317 Skyfox, a variant of the Aérospatiale Alouette III
- Skyfox Aviation Skyfox ultralight aircraft produced by Skyfox Aviation of Australia
- Skyfox (1984 video game), a 1984 computer game
- Sky Fox (1987 video game), an arcade game
- Skyfox is a character in Mark Millar's comic Jupiter's Legacy, as well as the TV adaptation
- Sky Fox (mythology) from Chinese mythology
