= Allen Weh =

American business executive and colonel (born 1942)

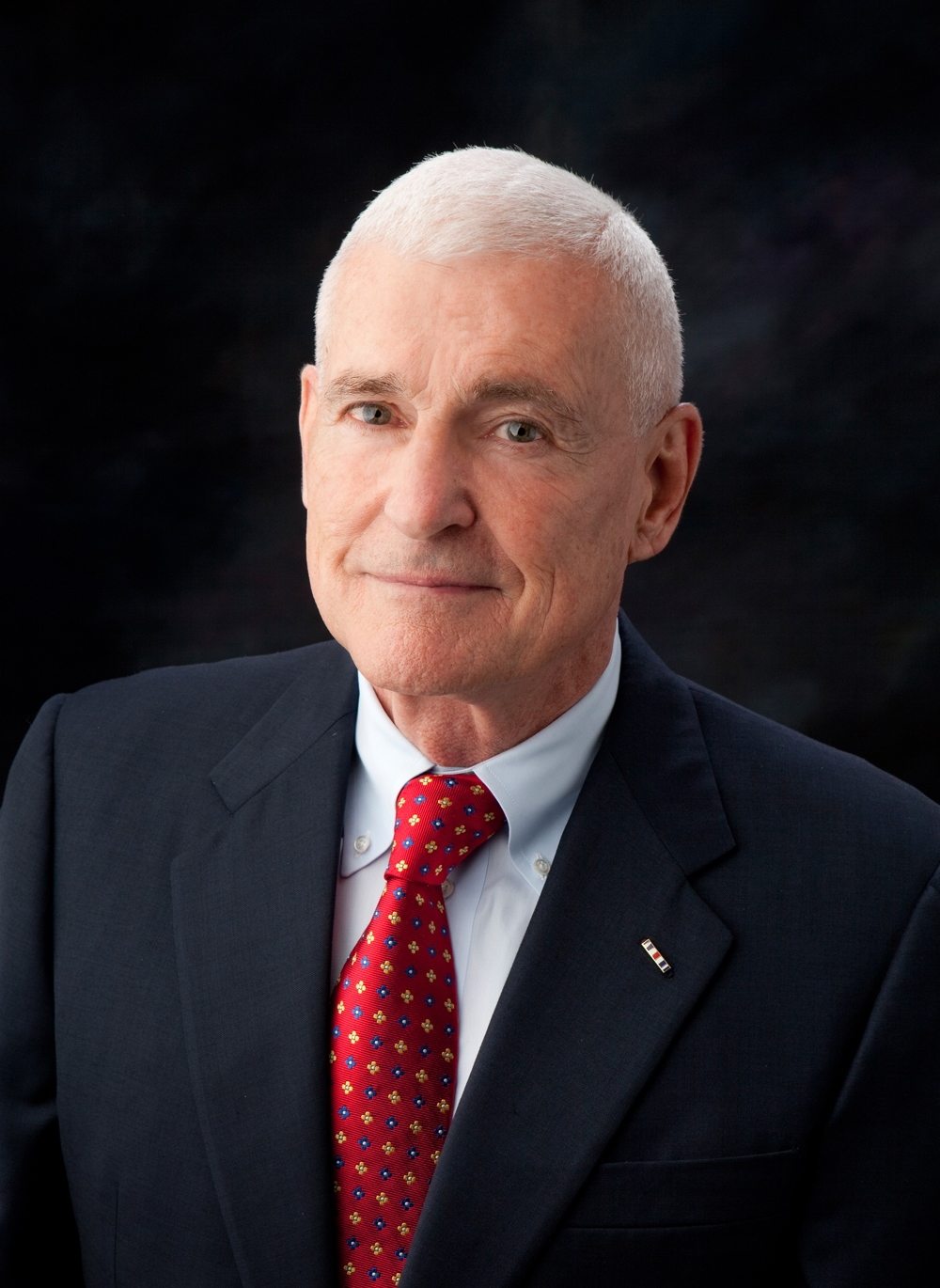
- Weh in 2013

Personal details
- Born: Allen Edward Weh; November 17, 1942 (age 84) Salem, Oregon, U.S.
- Party: Republican
- Spouse: Rebecca Roberton
- Children: 3
- Education: University of New Mexico (BS, MA)

Military service
- Allegiance: United States
- Branch/service: (United States Marine Corps) Marine Corps
- Rank: Colonel
- Unit: U.S. Marine Corps Reserve
- Awards: Silver Star; Legion of Merit; Bronze Star; Bronze Star (with valor); Purple Heart (with two gold stars); Meritorious Service Medal (with gold star); 5 Air Medals

Allen Edward Weh (born November 17, 1942) is an American business executive, politician, and retired colonel in the United States Marine Corps Reserve. He was a candidate for the Republican nomination for governor of New Mexico in the 2010 election, and the Republican Nominee for the United States Senate 2014 election against incumbent Democratic Senator Tom Udall.

He is the founder and CEO of CSI Aviation Inc., which provides aviation services, including medical flight services, emergency response, and detainee transport to government and other customers. It holds various certifications and licenses from the Federal Aviation Administration and other regulators.

== Early life and education ==
Weh was born in Salem, Oregon and grew up in North Carolina, Georgia, and New Jersey. Raised in Scotch Plains, New Jersey, Weh graduated from Scotch Plains-Fanwood High School in 1960. He earned a Bachelor of Science degree in education and Master of Arts in counseling from the University of New Mexico.

== Career ==
Weh began his military service as an enlisted Marine before selection for Officer Candidate School. He served two tours in Vietnam and with the British Royal Marines in Malaysia. Colonel Weh was recalled for active duty during the Persian Gulf War, for the U.S. expedition into Somalia, and to serve as Chief of Staff of Marine Forces Pacific prior to retiring in 1997. In 2003-2004 he was recalled from the USMC Retired List to serve in Iraq and given a key leadership role with the creation and organization of the new Iraqi Army. During his service, Weh received the Silver Star, the Legion of Merit, two Bronze Star Medals, one with V device, three Purple Hearts, two Meritorious Service Medals and five Air Medals.

In 1979, Weh and his wife, Rebecca Roberton Weh, launched CSI Aviation, Inc., a worldwide company that charters flights for private, commercial and government uses. In the years since, CSI has grown into a multimillion-dollar company, providing services to corporations, Department of Homeland Security, the Department of Defense, as well as commercial medical flight services among others.

Weh also served as chairman of the New Mexico Republican Party from 2004 to 2008.

=== 2010 gubernatorial primary ===
On 1 June 2010, Weh lost to his main opponent in the primary, Doña Ana County District Attorney Susana Martinez. At the end of the election, Weh came up second with the votes, as compared to opponents Susana Martinez who took the lead, Doug Turner who came to third, Pete Domenici, Jr. in fourth, and Janice Arnold Jones who came in last. Weh conceded to Martinez shortly after 9:00 PM when Martinez held over half of the precinct votes, or 8,000 votes greater than Weh. Weh offered his congratulations to Martinez just after her decided victory". Martinez went on to win the general election.

=== 2014 U.S. Senate election ===
In 2014, Allen Weh lost an election for US Senate running on the Republican ticket for United States Senate seat against the incumbent Democrat Tom Udall. In the primary he faced David Clements, also of Doña Ana County, a former assistant district attorney and chairman of the county Republican Party. In the straw poll at the Republican state convention, Clements polled a strong 47% against the well-known Weh, but in the June primary Weh beat Clements handily 63% to 37%.

In the general election Weh had the full support of the National Republican Senatorial Committee (NRSC), the NRA Political Victory Fund and other groups who sponsored independent political advertisements. However, in October the NRSC diverted its attention and money away from New Mexico to the six states that it thought would determine control of the Senate. In the first televised debate between Udall and Weh the issues of immigration reform, job creation in New Mexico, and drought management were addressed. Weh argued Udall was a rubber stamp for President Obama's policies and Udall said that he stood on his record. A second debate was scheduled at the last minute for 30 October, where issues included the national debt, Obamacare, and the economy. Weh clarified his position on the minimum wage saying, "I break with my party on this, I'm fine with raising the minimum wage." Udall won by 57,312 votes.

=== CEO and Founder, CSI Aviation ===
Allen Weh is the founder, president, and CEO of CSI Aviation. CSI Aviation is a major vendor for the Department of Homeland Security through Ice deportation flights. In July of 2026, Allen Weh was named in a lawsuit alleging that CSI Aviation violated a court order in returning a number of asylum seekers to Venezuela. According to investigations, CSI is one of the top vendors to ICE/DHS with Allen Weh and his wife Rebecca as large contributors to Donald Trumps 2024 presidential campaign.

== Notes ==
Party political offices
Preceded by Ramsey Gorham	Chair of the New Mexico Republican Party; 2004–2009	Succeeded by Harvey Yates
Preceded by Steve Pearce	Republican nominee for U.S. Senator from New Mexico (Class 2); 2014	Succeeded by Mark Ronchetti
