= Seeker Aviation Australia =

Australian aircraft manufacturer

Seeker Aviation Australia Pty Limited
- Industry: Aerospace
- Founded: 1983
- Headquarters: Albuquerque, New Mexico USA
- Key people: Ed Lundeen, CEO
- Products: ISR type certified aircraft
- Website: http://www.seekeraircraft.com/

Seeker Aviation Australia Pty Limited is an intelligence, surveillance and observation (ISR) aircraft manufacturer that was previously based in Hervey Bay, Queensland, Australia.

== History ==
Founded in 1983, Seabird Ultralight Aircraft began as a manufacturer of ultralight aircraft.

In 1986, Seabird Ultralight Aircraft changed its name to Seabird Aviation Australia Pty Ltd, and created their own products, the prototype Seabird SB5 Sentinel and certified Seabird SB7 Seeker aircraft, the forerunner of the current Seabird Seeker aircraft.

In 2014, Seabird Aviation Australia was acquired by Seeker Aircraft, Inc., a wholly owned subsidiary of a USA based aviation company CSI Aviation.

In 2018, Seabird Aviation Australia changed its name to Seeker Aviation Australia Pty Ltd.

In October 2019 Seeker Aviation Australia moved its operations from Hervey Bay, Queensland, Australia to Albuquerque, New Mexico USA

== Seabird Aviation Jordan L.L.C ==
Seabird Aviation Jordan L.L.C, now defunct, was Seabird's licensee in Jordan, responsible for manufacturing and marketing Seabird Seeker aircraft in the Middle East and Africa.
