= 2010 New Mexico gubernatorial election =

- November 2, 2010
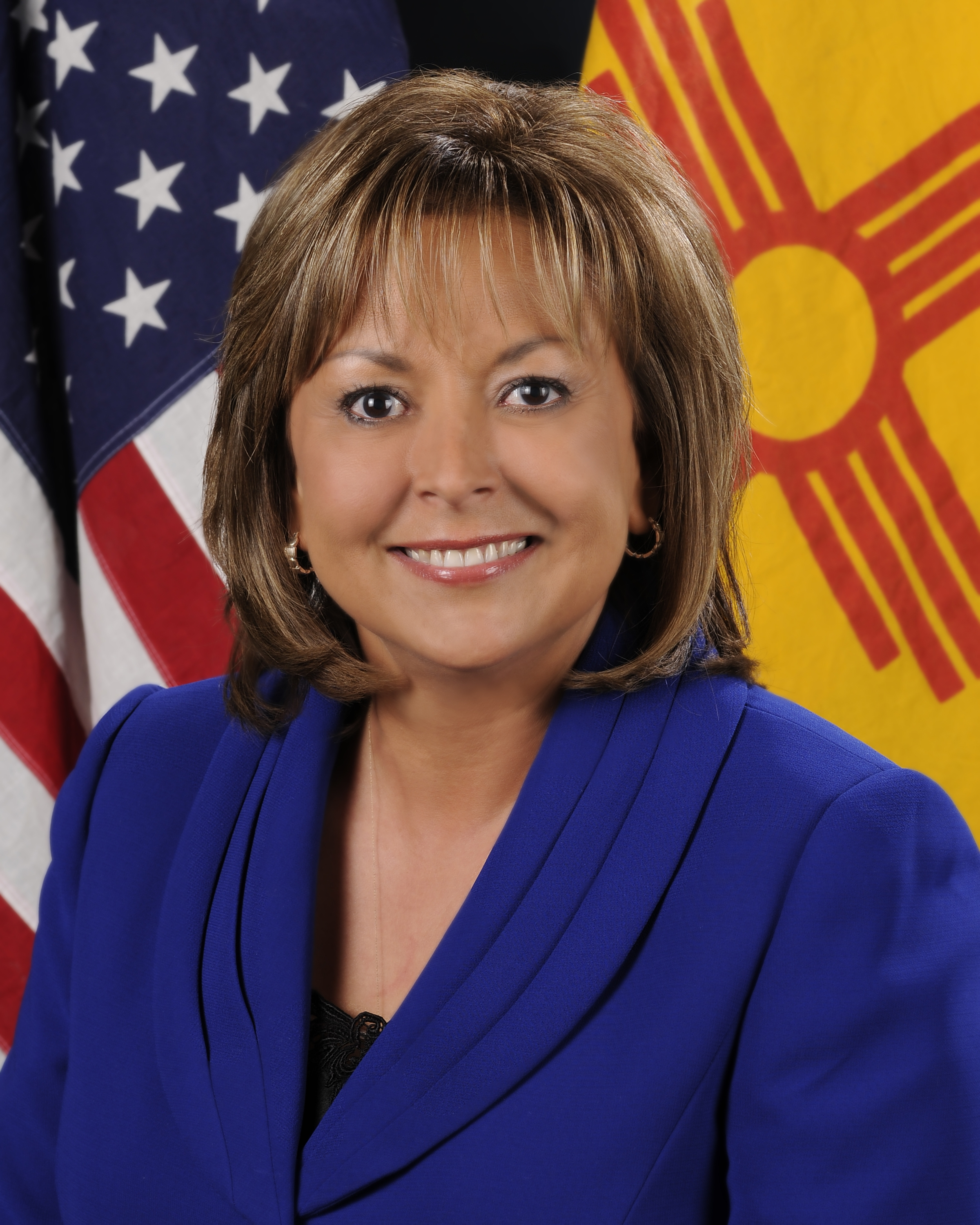

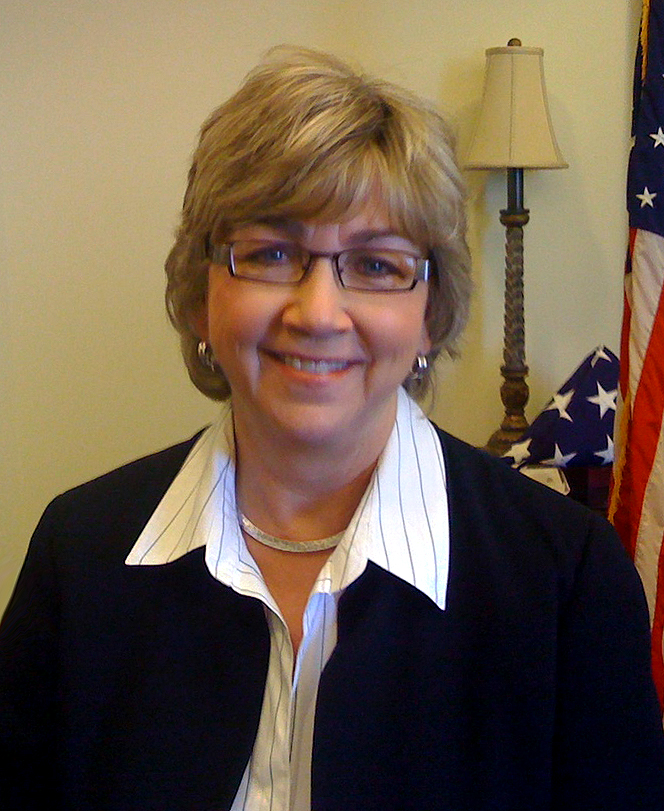
Nominee	Susana Martinez	Diane Denish
Party	Republican	Democratic
Running mate	John Sanchez	Brian Colón
Popular vote	321,219	280,614
Percentage	53.29%	46.55%
- Martínez: 50–60% 60–70% 70–80% 80–90% >90% Denish: 50–60% 60–70% 70–80% 80–90% >90% Tie: 50% No data
Governor before election
Bill Richardson
Democratic
Elected Governor
Susana Martínez
Republican

The 2010 New Mexico gubernatorial election took place on November 2, 2010. Democratic Governor Bill Richardson was term limited and could not seek a third consecutive term.

On June 1, 2010, the Republicans nominated Susana Martínez, the district attorney for Doña Ana County, New Mexico, and the Democrats nominated Lieutenant Governor Diane Denish.

While it was initially thought that Richardson would resign early to become Secretary of Commerce in the Obama administration, Richardson withdrew from the position due to allegations of corruption that were later cleared and he remained governor until the conclusion of his term.

Susana Martínez won the election on November 2, 2010, and became New Mexico's first elected female governor, as well as the first Latina governor of any state.

== Primary election ==
=== Democratic party ===
The Democratic primary election was held on June 1, 2010.

==== Candidates ====
- Diane Denish, lieutenant governor

===== Declined =====
- Val Kilmer, actor, activist

==== Results ====
Democratic primary results
Party	Candidate	Votes	%
Democratic	Diane Denish	108,302	99.07%
Democratic	Billy J. Driggs (write-in)	1,016	0.93%
Total votes		109,318	100.00%

=== Republican party ===
The Republican primary was held on June 1, 2010. Susana Martinez won the Republican nomination by getting over 50 percent of the vote in the primary. A pre-primary convention was held on March 13 and Martinez received 47 percent of the pre-primary Republican vote.

==== Candidates ====
===== Declared =====
- Janice Arnold-Jones, state representative
- Pete Domenici Jr., attorney and son of former U.S. Senator Pete Domenici
- Susana Martínez, Doña Ana County district attorney
- Doug Turner, former campaign manager for former Governor of New Mexico Gary Johnson
- Allen Weh, former chairman of the Republican Party of New Mexico

===== Declined =====
- Steve Pearce, former U.S. representative and nominee for the U.S. Senate in 2008 (ran for Congress)
- Heather Wilson, former U.S. representative and candidate for the U.S. Senate in 2008
- Gregory Zanetti, former Bernalillo County Republican Party chair and New Mexico National Guard brigadier general

==== Convention ====
A pre-primary nominating convention was held on March 13, 2010. Susana Martinez was victorious, winning the support of 46.65 percent of delegates, while Allen Weh received 26.32%, Janice Arnold-Jones received 13.16%, Doug Turner won 9.43%, and Pete Domenici Jr. won 4.61%. Candidates who receive less than 20% of the convention vote are required to collect twice as many signatures as those who received 20% in order to appear on the primary ballot. Nonetheless, Arnold-Jones, Turner and Domenici all signaled their intention to remain in the race.

==== Polling ====
Poll source	Date(s) administered	Sample size	Margin of error	Janice Arnold-Jones	Pete Domenici Jr.	Susana Martínez	Doug Turner	Allen Weh	Undecided
SurveyUSA	May 23–25, 2010	—	—	3%	8%	43%	8%	33%	5%
New Mexico State University	February 9–13, 2010	—	—	2.5%	29.3%	11.5%	6.8%	7.4%	42.6%

==== Results ====
Results by county: Martínez: 60–70%; 50–60%; 40–50%; <40%; Weh: <40%; 40–50%

Republican primary results
Party	Candidate	Votes	%
Republican	Susana Martínez	62,006	50.71%
Republican	Allen Weh	33,727	27.58%
Republican	Doug Turner	14,166	11.59%
Republican	Pete Domenici, Jr.	8,630	7.06%
Republican	Janice Arnold-Jones	3,740	3.06%
Total votes		122,269	100.00%

== General election ==
=== Predictions ===
Source	Ranking	As of
Cook Political Report	Tossup	October 14, 2010
Rothenberg	Lean R (flip)	October 28, 2010
RealClearPolitics	Lean R (flip)	November 1, 2010
Sabato's Crystal Ball	Likely R (flip)	October 28, 2010
CQ Politics	Likely D	October 28, 2010

=== Polling ===
Poll source	Date(s) administered	Sample size	Margin of error	Diane Denish (D)	Susana Martínez (R)	Other	Undecided
Rasmussen Reports	October 24, 2010	—	—	42%	52%	—	—
SurveyUSA	October 15, 2010	—	—	42%	54%	—	—
Rasmussen Reports	October 10, 2010	—	—	43%	52%	—	—
Rasmussen Reports	September 29, 2010	—	—	41%	51%	—	—
Albuquerque Journal	September 27–30, 2010	—	—	41%	47%	—	—
Public Policy Polling	September 25–26, 2010	—	—	42%	50%	—	—
Public Opinion Strategies	September 11–13, 2010	—	—	40%	50%	—	—
Albuquerque Journal	August 23–27, 2010	—	—	39%	45%	—	—
Rasmussen Reports	August 24, 2010	—	—	43%	48%	—	—
Magellan Strategies	June 21, 2010	—	—	43%	44%	—	—
Rasmussen Reports	June 3, 2010	—	—	42%	44%	—	—
Rasmussen Reports	May 25, 2010	—	—	43%	42%	—	—
SurveyUSA	May 23–25, 2010	—	—	43%	49%	—	—
Rasmussen Reports	March 24, 2010	—	—	51%	32%	—	—
Public Policy Polling	February 18–20, 2010	—	—	46%	32%	—	—

Hypothetical polling

With Arnold-Jones

Poll source	Date(s) administered	Sample size	Margin of error	Diane Denish (D)	Janice Arnold-Jones (R)	Other	Undecided
Rasmussen Reports	May 25, 2010	—	—	45%	31%	—	—
SurveyUSA	May 23–25, 2010	—	—	49%	35%	—	—
Rasmussen Reports	March 24, 2010	—	—	52%	30%	—	—
Public Policy Polling	February 18–20, 2010	—	—	47%	33%	—	—

With Domenici Jr.

Poll source	Date(s) administered	Sample size	Margin of error	Diane Denish (D)	Pete Domenici Jr. (R)	Other	Undecided
Rasmussen Reports	May 25, 2010	—	—	47%	30%	—	—
SurveyUSA	May 23–25, 2010	—	—	46%	40%	—	—
Rasmussen Reports	March 24, 2010	—	—	52%	35%	—	—
Public Policy Polling	February 18–20, 2010	—	—	45%	40%	—	—

With Turner

Poll source	Date(s) administered	Sample size	Margin of error	Diane Denish (D)	Doug Turner (R)	Other	Undecided
Rasmussen Reports	May 25, 2010	—	—	47%	31%	—	—
SurveyUSA	May 23–25, 2010	—	—	50%	36%	—	—
Rasmussen Reports	March 24, 2010	—	—	43%	34%	—	—
Public Policy Polling	February 18–20, 2010	—	—	46%	32%	—	—

With Weh

Poll source	Date(s) administered	Sample size	Margin of error	Diane Denish (D)	Allen Weh (R)	Other	Undecided
Rasmussen Reports	May 25, 2010	—	—	45%	39%	—	—
SurveyUSA	May 23–25, 2010	—	—	47%	42%	—	—
Rasmussen Reports	March 24, 2010	—	—	45%	35%	—	—
Public Policy Polling	February 18–20, 2010	—	—	48%	30%	—	—

=== Results ===
2010 New Mexico gubernatorial election
Party	Candidate	Votes	%	±%
Republican	Susana Martinez	321,219	53.29%	+22.10%
Democratic	Diane Denish	280,614	46.55%	−22.27%
Republican	Kenneth A. Gomez (write-in)	994	0.16%	
Majority		40,605	6.74%	
Total votes		602,827	100.00%	
Republican gain from Democratic		Swing	+44.37%	

==== By county ====
Martinez was the first Republican gubernatorial candidate to carry Guadalupe County since Edwin L. Mechem in 1958.

County	Susana Martinez Republican		Diane Denish Democratic		Kenneth A. Gomez Write-in		Margin		Total votes cast
County	#	%	#	%	#	%	#	%	Total votes cast
Bernalillo	102,711	50.79%	99,278	49.10%	218	0.11%	3,433	1.70%	202,207
Catron	1,472	77.60%	420	22.14%	5	0.26%	1,052	55.46%	1,897
Chaves	11,279	70.32%	4,715	29.40%	46	0.29%	6,564	40.92%	16,040
Cibola	3,176	48.52%	3,340	51.02%	30	0.46%	-164	-2.51%	6,546
Colfax	2,916	60.21%	1,913	39.50%	14	0.29%	1,003	20.71%	4,843
Curry	7,234	72.50%	2,700	27.06%	44	0.44%	4,534	45.44%	9,978
De Baca	619	68.93%	276	30.73%	3	0.33%	343	38.20%	898
Doña Ana	24,628	51.40%	23,190	48.40%	94	0.20%	1,438	3.00%	47,912
Eddy	10,144	69.22%	4,498	30.69%	12	0.08%	5,646	38.53%	14,654
Grant	5,165	48.76%	5,406	51.03%	22	0.21%	-241	-2.28%	10,593
Guadalupe	1,100	57.05%	828	42.95%	0	0.00%	272	14.11%	1,928
Harding	337	62.29%	204	37.71%	0	0.00%	133	24.58%	541
Hidalgo	1,014	58.18%	728	41.77%	1	0.06%	286	16.41%	1,743
Lea	9,661	74.18%	3,341	25.65%	21	0.16%	6,320	48.53%	13,023
Lincoln	5,544	73.50%	1,990	26.38%	9	0.12%	3,554	47.12%	7,543
Los Alamos	4,729	54.28%	3,972	45.59%	11	0.13%	757	8.69%	8,712
Luna	3,588	58.73%	2,498	40.89%	23	0.38%	1,090	17.84%	6,109
McKinley	5,850	34.69%	10,965	65.02%	50	0.30%	-5,115	-30.33%	16,865
Mora	1,220	46.39%	1,410	53.61%	0	0.00%	-190	-7.22%	2,630
Otero	11,085	69.70%	4,792	30.13%	27	0.17%	6,293	39.57%	15,904
Quay	1,955	65.10%	1,036	34.50%	12	0.40%	919	30.60%	3,003
Rio Arriba	4,818	40.47%	7,066	59.35%	22	0.18%	-2,248	-18.88%	11,906
Roosevelt	3,162	71.59%	1,244	28.16%	11	0.25%	1,918	43.42%	4,417
San Juan	24,857	69.59%	10,777	30.17%	86	0.24%	14,080	39.42%	35,720
San Miguel	3,508	38.31%	5,641	61.60%	8	0.09%	-2,133	-23.29%	9,157
Sandoval	24,097	56.50%	18,478	43.33%	72	0.17%	5,619	13.18%	42,647
Santa Fe	17,441	32.61%	35,963	67.24%	82	0.15%	-18,522	-34.63%	53,486
Sierra	2,887	65.78%	1,495	34.06%	7	0.16%	1,392	31.72%	4,389
Socorro	3,317	52.93%	2,942	46.94%	8	0.13%	375	5.98%	6,267
Taos	3,495	29.35%	8,415	70.65%	0	0.00%	-4,920	-41.31%	11,910
Torrance	3,788	67.35%	1,827	32.49%	9	0.16%	1,961	34.87%	5,624
Union	1,071	72.71%	400	27.16%	2	0.14%	671	45.55%	1,473
Valencia	13,351	59.97%	8,866	39.83%	45	0.20%	4,485	20.15%	22,262
Total	321,219	53.29%	280,614	46.55%	994	0.16%	40,605	6.74%	602,827

Counties that flipped from Democratic to Republican

- Bernalillo (largest city: Albuquerque)
- Chaves (largest village: Roswell)
- Colfax (largest city: Raton)
- Curry (largest village: Clovis)
- De Baca (largest city: Fort Sumner)
- Doña Ana (largest city: Las Cruces)
- Eddy (largest city: Carlsbad)
- Guadalupe (largest city: Santa Rosa)
- Harding (largest city: Roy)
- Hidalgo (largest city: Lordsburg)
- Lea (largest city: Hobbs)
- Lincoln (largest city: Roidoso)
- Los Alamos (largest city: Los Alamos)
- Luna (largest city: Deming)
- Otero (largest city: Alamogordo)
- Quay (largest city: Tucumcari)
- Roosevelt (largest city: Portales)
- San Juan (largest city: Farmington)
- Sandoval (largest city: Rancho)
- Sierra (largest city: Truth or Consequences)
- Socorro (largest city: Socorro)
- Torrance (largest city: Moriarty)
- Union (largest city: Clayton)
- Valencia (largest village: Los Lunas)

== See also ==
- Governorship of Susana Martínez
- 2010 United States gubernatorial elections
