= Tom Udall =

American politician and diplomat (born 1948)

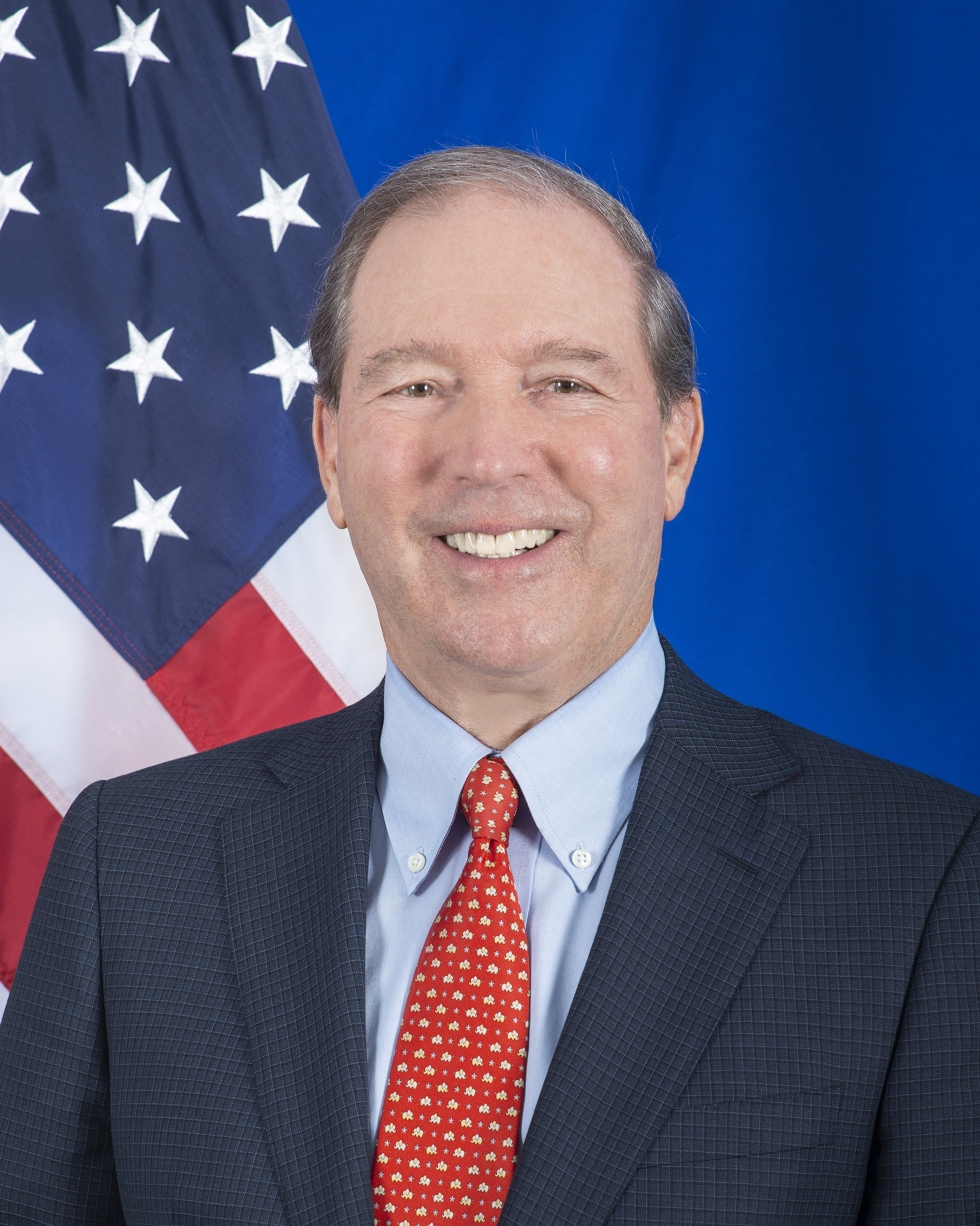
- Official portrait, 2021

United States Ambassador to Samoa
- In office February 17, 2022 – January 14, 2025
- President: Joe Biden
- Preceded by: Scott Brown
- Succeeded by: Jared Novelly

United States Ambassador to New Zealand
- In office December 2, 2021 – January 14, 2025
- President: Joe Biden
- Preceded by: Scott Brown
- Succeeded by: Jared Novelly

Vice Chair of the Senate Indian Affairs Committee
- In office January 3, 2017 – January 3, 2021
- Preceded by: Jon Tester
- Succeeded by: Lisa Murkowski

United States Senator from New Mexico
- In office January 3, 2009 – January 3, 2021
- Preceded by: Pete Domenici
- Succeeded by: Ben Ray Luján

Member of the U.S. House of Representatives from New Mexico's 3rd district
- In office January 3, 1999 – January 3, 2009
- Preceded by: Bill Redmond
- Succeeded by: Ben Ray Luján

28th Attorney General of New Mexico
- In office January 1, 1991 – January 1, 1999
- Governor: Bruce King; Gary Johnson
- Preceded by: Hal Stratton
- Succeeded by: Patricia A. Madrid

Personal details
- Born: Thomas Stewart Udall; May 18, 1948 (age 78) Tucson, Arizona, U.S.
- Party: Democratic
- Spouse: Jill Cooper
- Children: 1
- Relatives: See Udall family
- Education: Prescott College (BA); Downing College, Cambridge (LLB); University of New Mexico (JD)
- Udall's voice Udall on the Lautenberg Chemical Safety Act. Recorded May 7, 2015

Thomas Stewart Udall (/ˈjuːdɔːl/ YOO-dawl; born May 18, 1948) is an American diplomat, attorney, and politician who served as a United States senator for New Mexico from 2009 to 2021. A member of the Democratic Party, he also served as the U.S. representative for New Mexico's 3rd congressional district from 1999 to 2009 and New Mexico attorney general from 1991 to 1999. In 2022, he was made the United States Ambassador to New Zealand and Samoa, leaving his post in 2025. Born in Tucson, Arizona to the Udall family, he is the son of former U.S. Representative and Secretary of the Interior Stewart Udall and the nephew of former U.S. Representative Mo Udall. His cousin is Mark Udall, a Senator for the neighboring state of Colorado from 2009 to 2015.

Udall was first elected in the 2008 Senate race and was re-elected in 2014, and became dean of New Mexico's congressional delegation. He did not seek a third term in 2020, making him the only Democratic senator to retire that cycle. On July 16, 2021, President Joe Biden nominated Udall to serve as United States Ambassador to New Zealand and Samoa.

== Early life, education, and law career ==
Udall was born in Tucson, Arizona, to Ermalee Lenora (née Webb) and Stewart Udall, the Secretary of the Interior from 1961 to 1969. He is of partial Swiss ancestry on his mother's side. He completed his undergraduate education at Prescott College, before going on to receive a Bachelor of Laws degree from the University of Cambridge and a Juris Doctor from the University of New Mexico School of Law.

After law school, Udall clerked for Chief Judge Oliver Seth of the United States Court of Appeals for the Tenth Circuit in Denver, Colorado. From 1978 to 1981 he served as an Assistant United States Attorney for the District of New Mexico in the criminal division. He subsequently served as Chief Counsel to the New Mexico Department of Health and Environment in 1983 and 1984, where he litigated cases involving violations of state environmental and public health regulations.

== Early political career ==
In 1982, Udall ran for Congress in the newly created 3rd district, based in the state capital, Santa Fe, and including most of the north of the state. He lost the Democratic primary to Bill Richardson. In 1988, he ran for Congress again, this time in an election for the Albuquerque-based 1st district seat left open by retiring twenty-year incumbent Manuel Lujan Jr., but narrowly lost to Bernalillo County District Attorney Steven Schiff. From 1991 to 1999 he served as Attorney General of New Mexico.

== U.S. House of Representatives ==
=== Elections ===
Udall ran for Congress again in 1998 in the 3rd district against incumbent Bill Redmond, who had been elected in a 1997 special election to replace Richardson. Redmond was a conservative Republican representing a heavily Democratic district, and Udall defeated Redmond 53% to 43%. He was reelected four more times with no substantive opposition, including an unopposed run in 2002.

=== Tenure ===
As a U.S. Representative, Udall was a member of both the centrist New Democrat Coalition and the more liberal Congressional Progressive Caucus. He was a member of the United States House Peak oil Caucus, which he co-founded with Representative Roscoe Bartlett of Maryland.

=== Committee assignments ===
Udall sat on the United States House of Representatives Committee on Appropriations in the Subcommittee on Interior, Environment, and Related Agencies, the Subcommittee on Labor, Health and Human Services, Education, and Related Agencies and the Subcommittee on Legislative Branch.

=== Caucuses ===
He was the Co-Vice Chair of the House Native American Caucus and Co-Chair of the International Conservation Caucus.

== U.S. Senate ==
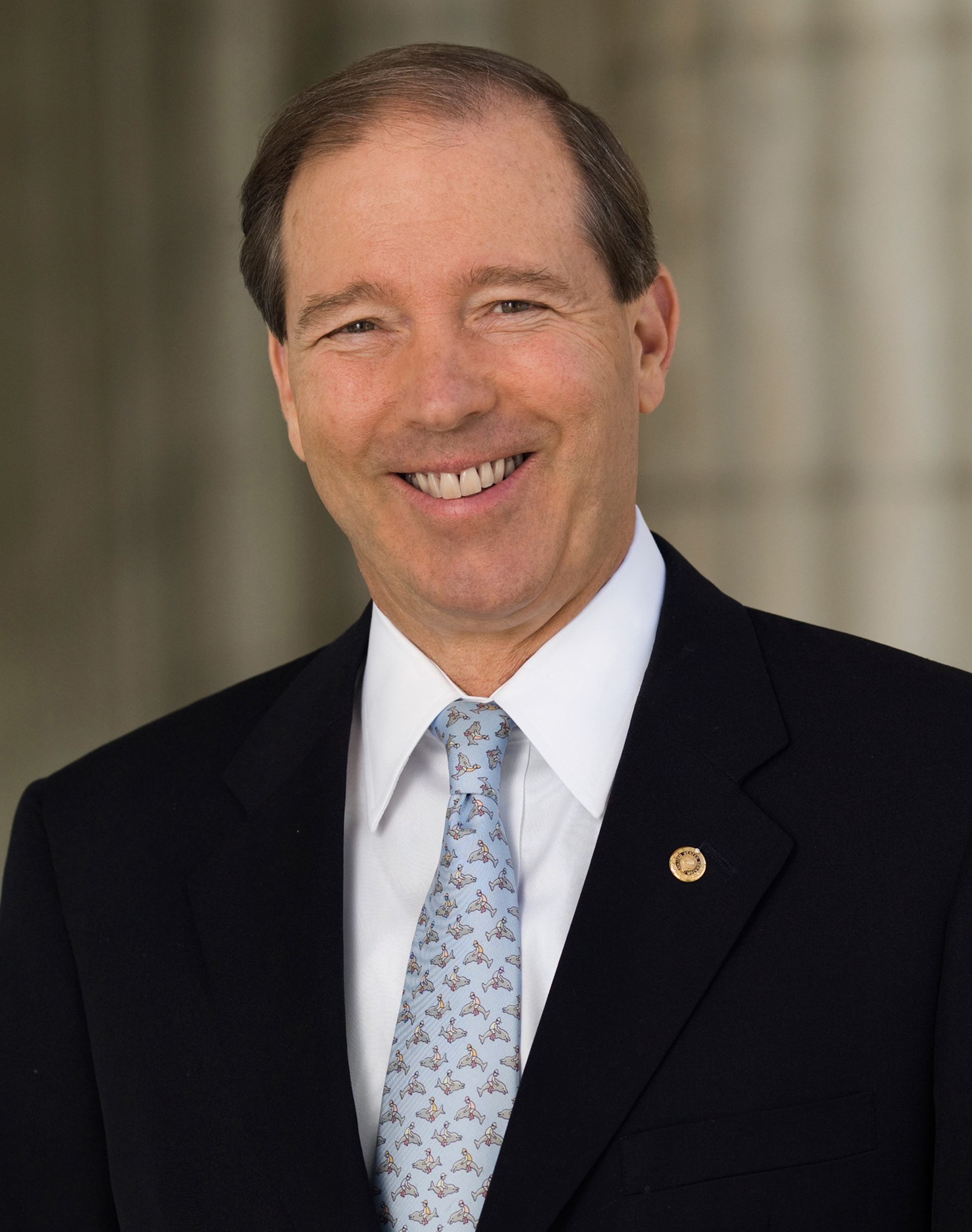
Udall's official Senate portrait, 2009

=== Elections ===
In November 2007, Udall announced his run for the Senate seat held by retiring six-term incumbent Republican Pete Domenici. Potential Democratic rival Albuquerque Mayor Martin Chavez dropped out, handing Udall the nomination. New Mexico's other two members of the House, 1st and 2nd district's Heather Wilson and Steve Pearce, ran in the Republican primary. Pearce won the Republican nomination, and lost to Udall, by 186,606 votes.

While Udall ran for Senate in New Mexico, his younger first cousin, Congressman Mark Udall, ran for the Senate in Colorado. Their double second cousin, incumbent Gordon Smith of Oregon, also ran for reelection. Both Udalls won but Smith lost.

In November 2014, Udall won re-election to his senate seat, defeating Republican Allen Weh by 57,312 votes

=== Tenure ===
He voted in favor of the Don't Ask, Don't Tell Repeal Act of 2010, FDA Food Safety Modernization Act, DREAM Act, American Recovery and Reinvestment Act of 2009, Patient Protection and Affordable Care Act, Children's Health Insurance Program Reauthorization Act, and the Lilly Ledbetter Fair Pay Act of 2009.

Udall was one of the first members of Congress to publicly express concern about the possibility of NSA overreach, a year before Edward Snowden's 2013 disclosure of the PRISM program.

On March 25, 2019, Udall announced that he would not run for reelection in 2020.

In November 2020, it was reported that Udall was being considered for Secretary of the Interior in the Biden administration.

=== Legislation ===
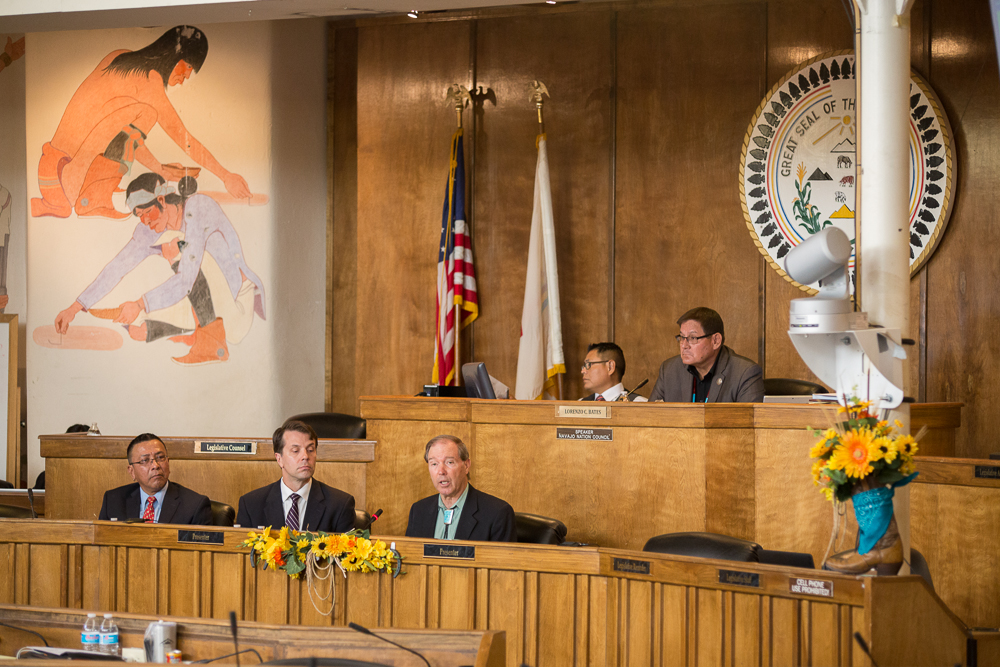
Tom Udall during his visit to the Navajo Nation Council Chamber in Window Rock, Arizona

On March 19, 2013, Udall introduced into the Senate the Sandia Pueblo Settlement Technical Amendment Act (S. 611; 113th Congress), a bill that would transfer some land to the Sandia Pueblo tribe.

Also during the 113th Congress, Udall introduced a proposed amendment to the Constitution that would reverse Citizens United and allow limits on outside spending in support of political candidates. The Amendment won the approval of the Senate Judiciary Committee on a 10–8 vote in July 2014.

In December 2014, Udall introduced a resolution condemning the Indonesian mass killings of 1965–66 and calling for the declassification of documents on United States involvement in the genocide.

In March 2015, Udall sponsored S. 697, the Frank R. Lautenberg Chemical Safety for the 21st Century Act, a bill to amend and reauthorize the Toxic Substances Control Act. The legislation, as amended, was signed into law by President Barack Obama on June 22, 2016. It updated the nation's safety system for thousands of chemicals in products like cleaners, paints, carpets and furniture. The bill initially faced criticism over the balance between federal and state authority to regulate chemicals, but after changes to the legislation, it earned broader support, including from liberal members of the Senate and the President. It passed by a vote of 403-12 in the House and voice vote in the Senate.

In March 2019, he and Rand Paul co-sponsored the bipartisan AFGHAN Service Act to compensate members of the armed forces and repeal the 2001 Authorization for Use of Military Force Against Terrorists at the end of the Afghanistan withdrawal.

=== Committee assignments ===
Udall's committee assignments included:

- Committee on Appropriations
  - Subcommittee on Agriculture, Rural Development, Food and Drug Administration, and Related Agencies
  - Subcommittee on Energy and Water Development
  - Subcommittee on Financial Services and General Government
  - Subcommittee on Interior, Environment, and Related Agencies (Ranking Member)
  - Subcommittee on Military Construction, Veterans Affairs, and Related Agencies
- Committee on Foreign Relations
  - Subcommittee on African Affairs
  - Subcommittee on East Asian and Pacific Affairs
  - Subcommittee on International Development and Foreign Assistance, Economic Affairs and International Environmental Protection, and Peace Corps
  - Subcommittee on Western Hemisphere and Global Narcotics Affairs
- Committee on Commerce, Science, and Transportation
- Committee on Indian Affairs
- Committee on Rules and Administration
- Commission on Security and Cooperation in Europe
- International Narcotics Control Caucus

=== Caucuses ===
- Congressional Law Enforcement Caucus
- House Native American Caucus (Co-Vice Chair)
- International Conservation Caucus (Co-Chair)
- Rural Caucus
- Sportsmen's Caucus
- Afterschool Caucuses

== Political positions ==
=== Gun law ===
In 2013, Udall voted for state-by-state reciprocity of concealed carry and for the names of gun owners to be protected and released only in select situations. In 2016, within weeks of the Orlando nightclub shooting, he participated in a sit-in at the House to demand votes on gun control legislation, saying, "We owe it to the LGBT community & all families harmed by gun violence to keep terror suspects fr[om] obtaining guns." In 2017, Udall had a "C−" grade from the National Rifle Association and a "F" grade from the Gun Owners of America for his support of gun control.

=== Environmental issues ===
Udall has a lifetime score of 96% from the League of Conservation Voters. In 2018 he received the Sierra Club's top award for public officials, the Edgar Wayburn Award.

In September 2019, Udall was one of eight senators to have signed a bipartisan letter to congressional leadership requesting full and lasting funding of the Land and Water Conservation Act to aid national parks and public lands, benefit the $887 billion American outdoor recreation economy, and "ensure much-needed investment in our public lands and continuity for the state, tribal, and non-federal partners who depend on them."

In late 2019, Udall co-sponsored the Green New Deal, a policy introduced in the U.S. Senate that would establish net-zero carbon emissions by 2050.

== Ambassador to New Zealand and Samoa ==
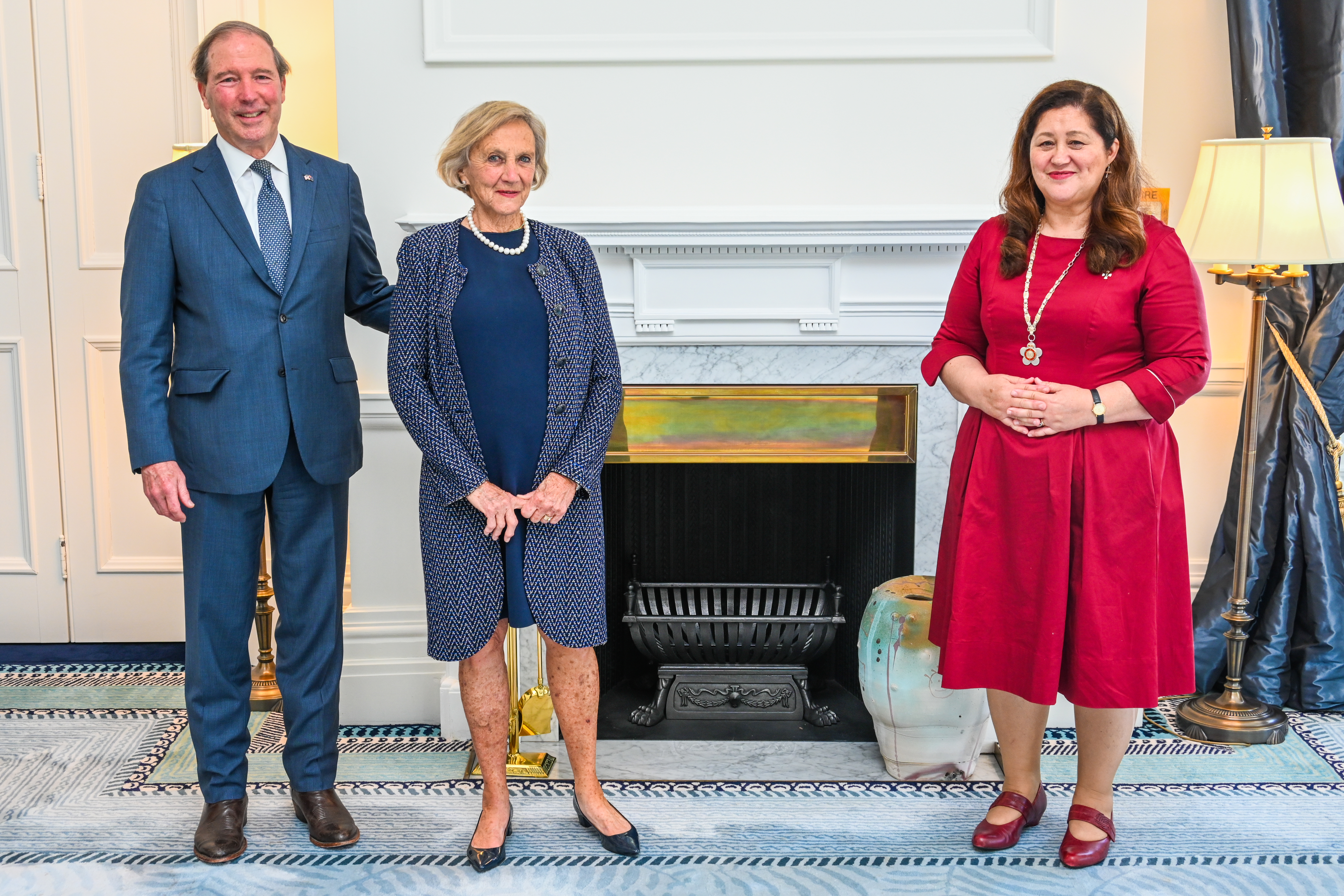
Udall and his wife meet with Governor-General Cindy Kiro (right) at Government House, Wellington to present his credentials as US ambassador on December 2, 2021

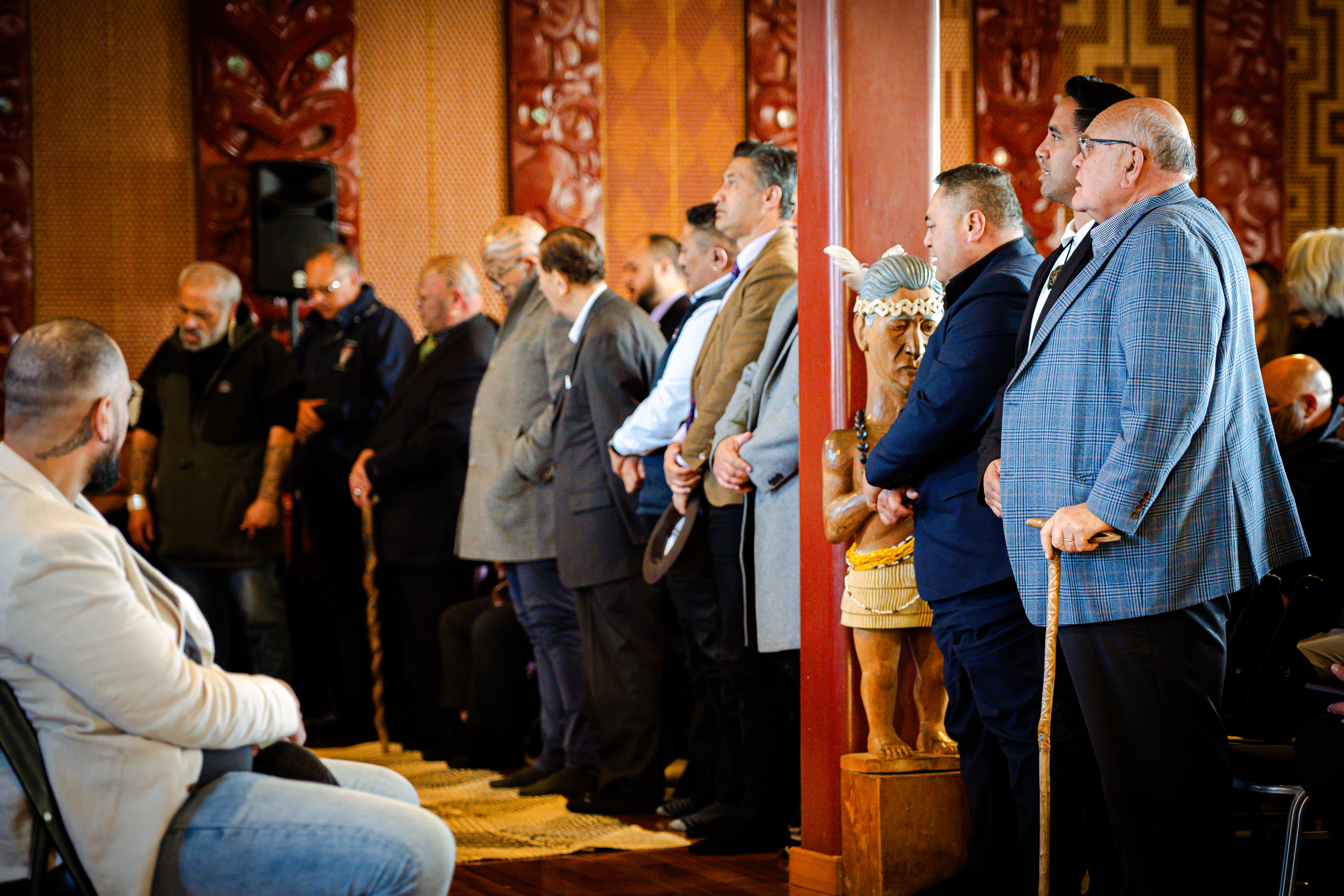
Ambassador Tom Udall attends Te Māori Tū at Waiwhetū Marae and Te Papa Tongarewa in Lower Hutt, New Zealand on 9 September 2024

On July 16, 2021, President Joe Biden nominated Udall to serve as United States Ambassador to New Zealand and Samoa. On September 22, a hearing on his nomination was held before the Senate Foreign Relations Committee. On October 19, his nomination was reported favorably out of committee. The Senate confirmed Udall by voice vote on October 26.

Udall presented his credentials to the New Zealand governor-general, Dame Cindy Kiro, in Wellington on December 2, 2021. On February 17, 2022, he virtually presented his credentials to the Head of State of Samoa, Afioga Tuimalealiʻifano Vaʻaletoʻa Sualauvi II. Udall's term ended with that of the Biden administration in 2025.

== Electoral history ==
1990 New Mexico Attorney General election
Primary election
| Party | Candidate | Votes | % |
|---|---|---|---|
| Democratic | Tom Udall | 59,676 | 35.95 |
| Democratic | Patricia Madrid | 50,875 | 30.65 |
| Democratic | Dick Minzner | 28,860 | 17.39 |
| Democratic | Patrick Apodoco | 26,576 | 16.01 |
| Total votes | | 165,987 | 100.00 |
General election
| Democratic | Tom Udall | 265,582 | 67.59 |
| Republican | William Davis | 127,364 | 32.41 |
| Total votes | | 392,946 | 100.00 |
| Democratic gain from Republican | | | |

1994 New Mexico Attorney General election
| Party | Candidate | Votes | % |
|---|---|---|---|
| Democratic | Tom Udall (incumbent) | 277,225 | 60.92 |
| Republican | Donald Bruckner Jr. | 177,822 | 39.08 |
| Total votes | | 455,047 | 100.00 |
| Democratic hold | | | |

1998 U.S. House election for New Mexico's 3rd district
Primary election
| Party | Candidate | Votes | % |
|---|---|---|---|
| Democratic | Tom Udall | 32,533 | 44.03 |
| Democratic | Eric Serna | 26,340 | 35.64 |
| Democratic | Roman Maes III | 4,382 | 5.93 |
| Democratic | Tony Scarborough | 3,681 | 4.98 |
| Democratic | Carol Cloer | 2,631 | 3.56 |
| Democratic | Patricia Lundstrom | 2,580 | 3.49 |
| Democratic | Francesca Lobato | 1,251 | 1.69 |
| Democratic | Eric Treisman | 498 | 0.67 |
| Total votes | | 73,896 | 100.00 |
General election
| Democratic | Tom Udall | 91,248 | 53.16 |
| Republican | Bill Redmond (incumbent) | 74,266 | 43.27 |
| Green | Carol Miller | 6,103 | 3.56 |
| Write-in | | 32 | 0.01 |
| Total votes | | 171,649 | 100.00 |
| Democratic gain from Republican | | | |

2000 U.S. House election for New Mexico's 3rd district
| Party | Candidate | Votes | % |
|---|---|---|---|
| Democratic | Tom Udall (incumbent) | 135,040 | 67.18 |
| Republican | Lisa Lutz | 65,979 | 32.82 |
| Total votes | | 201,019 | 100.00 |
| Democratic hold | | | |

2002 U.S. House election for New Mexico's 3rd district
| Party | Candidate | Votes | % |
|---|---|---|---|
| Democratic | Tom Udall (incumbent) | 122,921 | 100.00 |
| Total votes | | 122,921 | 100.00 |
| Democratic hold | | | |

2004 U.S. House election for New Mexico's 3rd district
| Party | Candidate | Votes | % |
|---|---|---|---|
| Democratic | Tom Udall (incumbent) | 175,269 | 68.68 |
| Republican | Gregory Tucker | 79,935 | 31.32 |
| Total votes | | 255,204 | 100.00 |
| Democratic hold | | | |

2006 U.S. House election for New Mexico's 3rd district
| Party | Candidate | Votes | % |
|---|---|---|---|
| Democratic | Tom Udall (incumbent) | 144,880 | 74.64 |
| Republican | Ronald Dolin | 49,219 | 25.36 |
| Total votes | | 194,099 | 100.00 |
| Democratic hold | | | |

Democratic Party primary results
| Party | Candidate | Votes | % |
|---|---|---|---|
| Democratic | Tom Udall | 141,629 | 100.00 |
| Total votes | | 141,629 | 100.00 |

New Mexico's US Senate Election, 2008
| Party | Candidate | Votes | % | ±% |
|---|---|---|---|---|
| Democratic | Tom Udall | 505,128 | 61.33% | +26.37% |
| Republican | Steve Pearce | 318,522 | 38.67% | −26.37% |
| Majority | | 186,606 | 22.66% | −7.43% |
| Turnout | | 823,650 | | |
| Democratic gain from Republican | | Swing | | |

Democratic primary results
| Party | Candidate | Votes | % |
|---|---|---|---|
| Democratic | Tom Udall (incumbent) | 113,502 | 100 |
| Total votes | | 113,502 | 100 |

New Mexico's US Senate Election, 2014
| Party | Candidate | Votes | % |
|---|---|---|---|
| Democratic | Tom Udall (incumbent) | 286,409 | 55.56 |
| Republican | Allen Weh | 229,097 | 44.44 |
| Total votes | | 515,506 | 100 |
| Democratic hold | | | |

== Personal life ==
Udall and his wife, the former Jill Cooper, have a daughter. Tom Udall is the son of former Arizona Congressman and Interior Secretary Stewart Lee Udall, nephew of Arizona Congressman Morris Udall, and first cousin of former Colorado U.S. Senator Mark Udall, double second cousin of former Oregon U.S. Senator Gordon Smith, and second cousin of Utah U.S. Senator Mike Lee.

Udall is a member of The Church of Jesus Christ of Latter-day Saints.

== See also ==
- Lee–Hamblin family

Legal offices
| Preceded by Hal Stratton | Attorney General of New Mexico; 1991–1999 | Succeeded by Patricia Madrid |
U.S. House of Representatives
| Preceded by Bill Redmond | Member of the U.S. House of Representatives from New Mexico's 3rd congressional district 1999–2009 | Succeeded by Ben Luján |
Party political offices
| Preceded by Gloria Tristani | Democratic nominee for U.S. Senator from New Mexico (Class 2); 2008, 2014 | Succeeded by Ben Luján |
U.S. Senate
| Preceded by Pete Domenici | United States Senator (Class 2) from New Mexico; 2009–2021; Served alongside: Jeff Bingaman, Martin Heinrich | Succeeded by Ben Ray Luján |
| Preceded by Jon Tester | Ranking Member of the Senate Indian Affairs Committee; 2017–2021 | Succeeded by Lisa Murkowski |
Diplomatic posts
| Preceded by Scott Brown | United States Ambassador to New Zealand; 2021–2025 | Succeeded by David Gehrenbeck; Acting |
| Preceded by Scott Brown | United States Ambassador to Samoa; 2022–2025 | Succeeded by David Gehrenbeck; Acting |
U.S. order of precedence (ceremonial)
| Preceded by Wayne Allard as Former U.S. Senator | Order of precedence of the United States | Succeeded by Jim DeMint as Former U.S. Senator |
