= David Clements (lawyer) =

Former professor of the New Mexico State University

David Clements is a former American lawyer and a former assistant professor at New Mexico State University. He is known for his advocacy of election conspiracy theories in the United States.

== Career ==
David Clements was a district attorney before starting a tenure-track faculty position as an assistant professor at New Mexico State University in the department of finance. He had previously run for state senate in New Mexico unsuccessfully in 2014. Following his loss, Clements claimed that his primary opponent Allen Weh had hacked his email account; in turn, Weh initiated a lawsuit against Clements for defamation.

=== Election denialism ===
In 2021, Clements became an advocate for auditing the 2020 US presidential election. He was described by The Washington Post as a "self-appointed election fraud evangelist", and has advocated for methods of perpetuating election interference in future presidential elections. In October 2021, he was terminated from his position at New Mexico State University due to his refusal to abide by the university's medical safety requirements during the COVID-19 pandemic in the United States. After this, he started traveling the US to provide speeches revolving around the conspiracy theory that elections in the United States had been compromised. These included events sponsored by election denialist Mike Lindell.

== Personal life ==
Clements is married to his wife Erin, who has helped her husband in efforts to publicize alleged election fraud which they believe to have occurred during the 2020 presidential election in the United States.
