= CSI Aviation =

Airline of the United States

CSI Aviation, Inc.
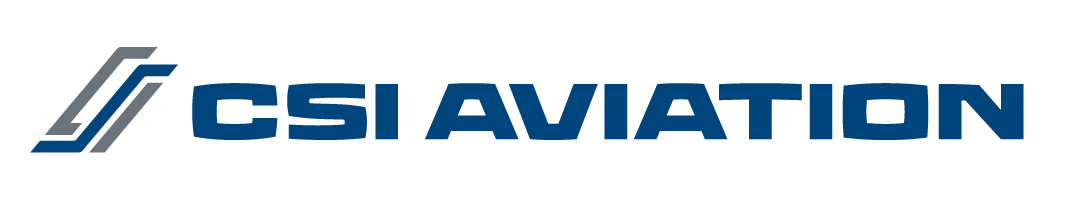
- Type: Private
- Founded: 1979
- Founder: Allen Weh
- Headquarters: Killeen, TX, United States
- Area served: Worldwide
- Website: www.csiaviation.com

CSI Aviation, Inc. is a worldwide aviation services company and FAR Part 135 air carrier (Certificate# GRTA447E) headquartered in Killeen, Texas with bases in Albuquerque, New Mexico, and West Palm Beach, Florida. Founded in 1979 by Allen Weh, CSI provides air charter and aviation services to corporations, and government agencies. CSI also maintains a GSA Schedule (Contract # GS-33F-0025V) to provide air charter services to the United States government as both an air carrier and manager of aviation programs. In 2025 it received $1.23 billion from the US Immigration and Customs Enforcement (ICE).

== History ==
CSI Aviation was founded in 1979 by Allen Weh, a now retired colonel in the United States Marine Corps Reserve.

In 1983, CSI began representing various United States airlines to the U.S. Department of Defense (DOD) through the U.S. Military Traffic Command, which included handling Civil Reserve Air Fleet (CRAF) coordinating domestic and international military scheduled and air charter requirements.

In 2009, CSI began offering fuel services.

In 2014, CSI acquired a Texas based Part 135 Operation to add organic Flight Operations capability to its operations.

In 2016, CSI's Part 135 division added Medical Flight Services, which is accredited by the National Accreditation Alliance Medical Transport Applications (NAAMTA)

=== 2017–present ===
In September 2017, CSI deployed a Seeker Aircraft to Southeast Texas in support of the Hurricane Harvey relief efforts.

CSI was awarded the Freedom Award by the Department of Defense in 2017 for its support of military employees.

CSI Aviation was certified by the U.S. Military Commercial Airlift Review Board (CARB) in 2018 to operate on-demand passenger, cargo and air medical flights for the U.S. Defense Department (DOD)

In 2019, CSI was awarded a position on a $5.7 billion contract to provide worldwide airlift services for the US Department of Defense (DoD). The firm-fixed-price indefinite-delivery, indefinite-quantity contract was awarded by the US Transportation Command (TRANSCOM).

Also in 2019, CSI began operating daily flights under contract for the U.S. Navy between West Palm Beach, FL and a Navy Base in the Bahama Islands.

In 2020, CSI was tasked by U.S. Health and Human Services to airlift almost two thousand passengers from a cruise ship docked in Oakland, CA due to an outbreak of COVID-19.

In July 2023 under the Biden Administration, U.S. Immigration and Customs Enforcement awarded CSI a no-bid contract worth $128 million to deport illegal immigrants pursuant to enforcement of the Alien Enemies Act.

In 2024 CSI provided space for Donald Trump to conduct a rally for his presidential campaign in Albuquerque.

On February 17, 2026 the Project for Government Oversight published that CSI's revenue from contracts associated with United States Immigration and Customs Enforcement (ICE) had more than tripled since the beginning of President Trump's second term. CSI revenue from ICE-related government contracts increased from $363.9 million during President Biden's fourth year in office to $1.23 billion during President Trump's first year in office. On July 17, CSI was sued by Venezuelan men who were deported to El Salvador by ICE in three planes despite a federal judge order against it. The men accused the company of violating their civil rights, false imprisonment, intentional infliction of emotional distress and negligence.

== Fleet ==
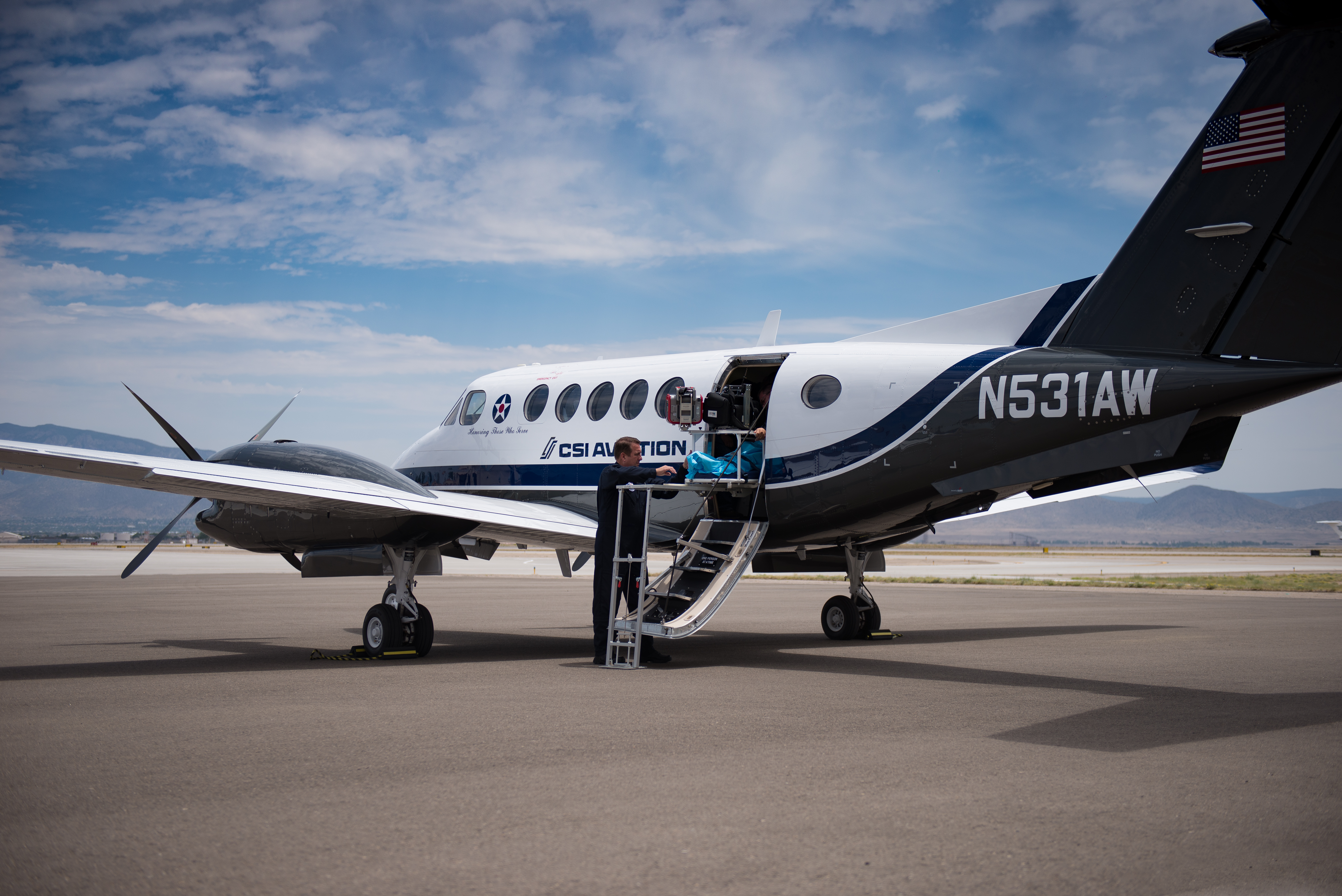
A CSI crew member loads a patient onto a medical flight equipped King Air in Albuquerque, New Mexico.

=== Current fleet ===
As of August 2025, CSI Aviation operates the following aircraft:

CSI Aviation fleet
Aircraft	In service	Orders	Notes
Beechcraft 1900D	4	—	
Total	4	—	

CSI operates a fleet of twin-engine high-performance Beechcraft turboprops. These aircraft are preferred for their excellent safety record, comfort, speed, and reliability. All aircraft operated by CSI are flown by two type rated pilots.

== Accidents ==
- On August 5, 2025 a Beechcraft King Air 300 operated by CSI crashed while approaching Chinle Municipal Airport, Arizona, killing all four occupants on board.
