= Skyfox Aviation Skyfox =

Skyfox
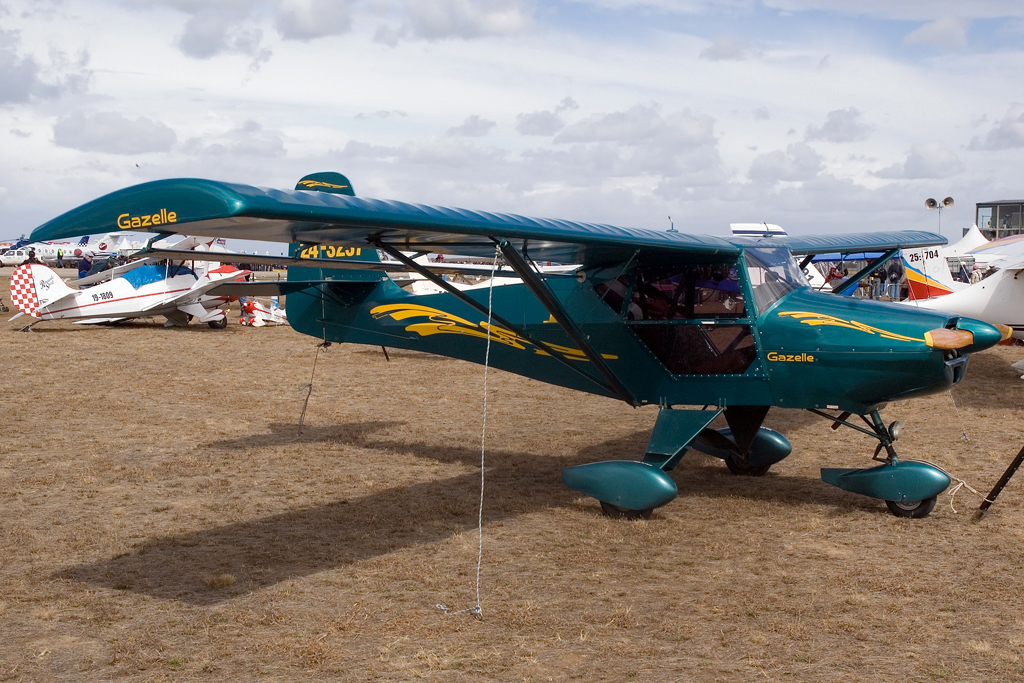
- Skyfox CA25N Gazelle

General information
- Type: Ultralight cabin monoplane
- National origin: Australia
- Manufacturer: Skyfox Aviation
- Number built: 100+

History
- First flight: 6 September 1989

The Skyfox Aviation Skyfox is an Australian ultralight cabin monoplane designed by Skyfox Aviation of Queensland and first flown in 1989. Originally sold as an ultralight it was later produced for general aviation use.

== Design and development ==
The Skyfox is a high-wing braced monoplane with a conventional tailwheel landing gear with a fixed tailwheel. It has a welded steel fuselage with fabric covering. The wings can be folded when not in use along the side of the fuselage.

Originally built to meet Australian ultralight regulations the latter CA-25 is built to JAR-VLA rules.

== Variants ==
CA-21
Volkswagen-engined variant, production ended in 1991
CA-22
Ultralight variant with a Rotax 912 engine.
CA-25 Impala
General aviation variant
CA-25N Gazelle
CA-25 with nosewheel landing gear.

== Specifications (CA-25) ==
Data from

General characteristics

- Crew: 2
- Wingspan: 31 ft 3 in (9.53 m)
- Height: 6 ft 1.5 in (1.87 m)
- Wing area: 124.6 sq ft (11.58 m^{2})
- Empty weight: 640 lb (290 kg)
- Gross weight: 1,150 lb (522 kg)
- Powerplant: 1 × Rotax 912 piston engine , 78 hp (58 kW)

Performance

- Maximum speed: 109 mph (176 km/h, 95 kn)
- Cruise speed: 98 mph (157 km/h, 85 kn)
- Range: 372 mi (598 km, 323 nmi)
- Rate of climb: 800 ft/min (2.44 m/s)
