= 2024 United States Senate election in New Mexico =

- November 5, 2024
- Turnout: 65.3% ▲
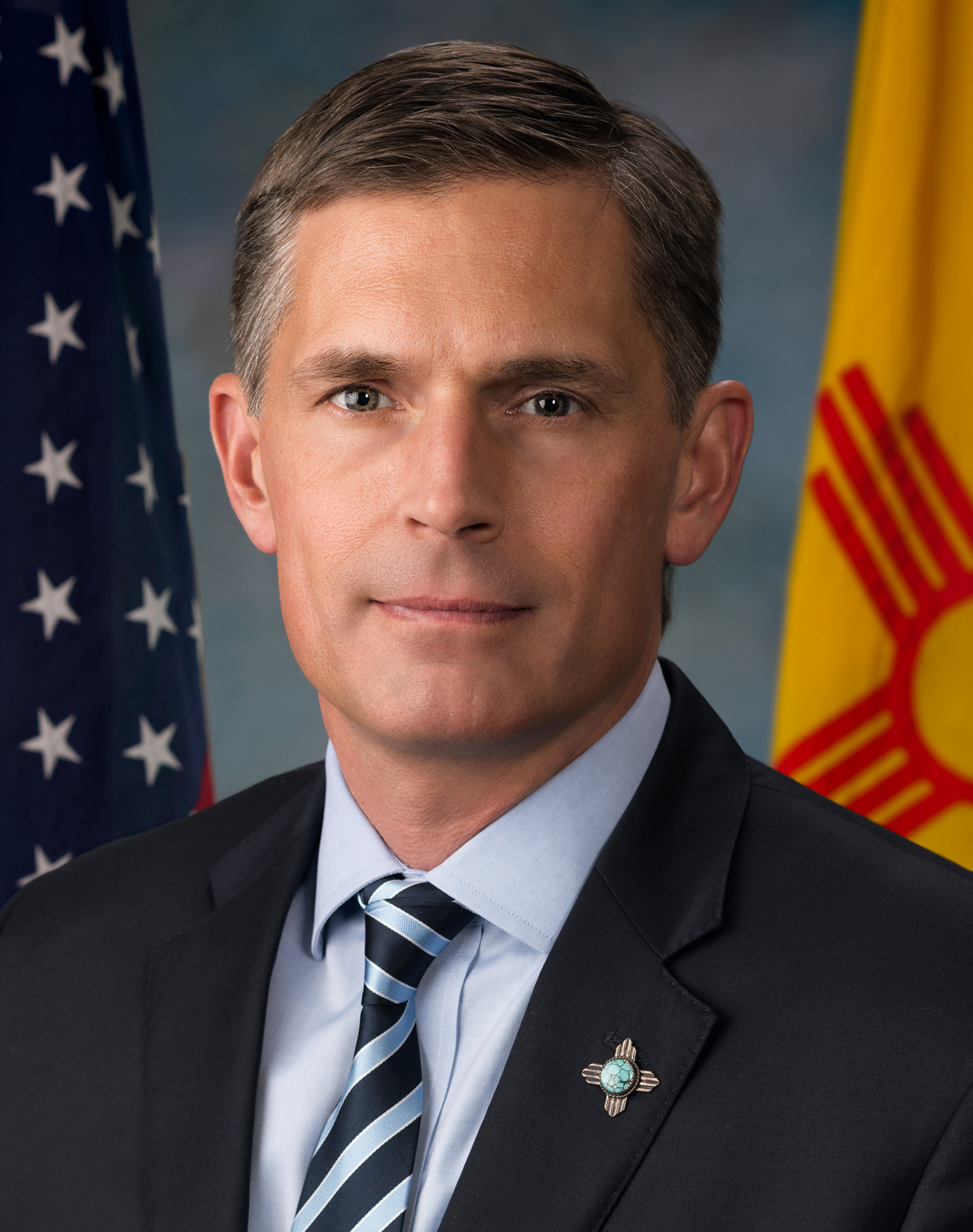

Nominee	Martin Heinrich	Nella Domenici
Party	Democratic	Republican
Popular vote	497,333	405,978
Percentage	55.06%	44.94%
- Heinrich: 50–60% 60–70% 70–80% 80–90% >90% Domenici: 50–60% 60–70% 70–80% 80–90% >90% Tie: 50% No votes
U.S. senator before election
Martin Heinrich
Democratic
Elected U.S. Senator
Martin Heinrich
Democratic

The 2024 United States Senate election in New Mexico was held on November 5, 2024, to elect a member of the United States Senate to represent the state of New Mexico. Democratic incumbent Martin Heinrich won re-election to a third term, defeating Republican financier Nella Domenici. Primary elections took place on June 4, 2024, with both Heinrich and Domenici winning their respective party's nomination unopposed. Republicans have not won a Senate race in New Mexico since Domenici's late father Pete did so in 2002.

Heinrich was first elected in 2012 by a 5.7-point margin, succeeding longtime Democratic incumbent Jeff Bingaman. In 2018, Heinrich was reelected to his second term by an overwhelming 23.6-point margin, but this was largely due to the presence of third-party candidate and former governor of the state Gary Johnson, who ran as a Libertarian and garnered over 15% of the vote. Come Election Day in 2024, Heinrich was reelected to a third term in office by 10.12%, receiving 55.1% of the statewide vote to Domenici's 44.9%. While an underperformance of his 2018 margin, his margin of victory was an overperformance of Kamala Harris' 6-point victory in the state in the concurrent presidential election.

Heinrich also held his own quite well at a county-by-county level, particularly when compared to the performances of Kamala Harris. For example, Heinrich carried the counties of Guadalupe and Cibola by 21.7% and 13.2%, respectively, which Harris carried in the concurrent presidential election by meager margins of 0.72% and 1.6%, respectively. Heinrich also carried Socorro County by around 4.8%, which was carried by Donald Trump in the presidential race by around 4%.

== Democratic primary ==
=== Candidates ===
==== Nominee ====
- Martin Heinrich, incumbent U.S. senator

=== Fundraising ===
Campaign finance reports as of May 15, 2024
Candidate	Raised	Spent	Cash on hand
Martin Heinrich (D)	$9,067,125	$5,341,198	$4,380,901
Source: Federal Election Commission

=== Results ===
Democratic primary results
Party	Candidate	Votes	%
Democratic	Martin Heinrich (incumbent)	122,961	100.0%
Total votes		122,961	100.0%

== Republican primary ==
=== Candidates ===
==== Nominee ====
- Nella Domenici, former CFO of Bridgewater Associates and daughter of former U.S. Senator Pete Domenici

==== Disqualified ====
- Manuel Gonzales III, former Democratic Bernalillo County Sheriff (2014–2022) and candidate for mayor of Albuquerque in 2021

=== Fundraising ===
Campaign finance reports as of May 15, 2024
Candidate	Raised	Spent	Cash on hand
Nella Domenici (R)	$1,525,766	$464,576	$1,061,190
Source: Federal Election Commission

=== Results ===
Republican primary results
Party	Candidate	Votes	%
Republican	Nella Domenici	79,809	100.0%
Total votes		79,809	100.0%

== Independents and third-party candidates ==
=== Candidates ===
==== Filed paperwork ====
- Cameron Chick (Independent), businessman
- Ben Luna (Independence Party), businessman
- Jerry Rose (Independent)
- Tom Wakely (Green)

== General election ==
=== Predictions ===
Source	Ranking	As of
The Cook Political Report	Solid D	November 9, 2023
Inside Elections	Solid D	November 9, 2023
Sabato's Crystal Ball	Safe D	November 9, 2023
Decision Desk HQ/The Hill	Likely D	October 30, 2024
Elections Daily	Safe D	May 4, 2023
CNalysis	Solid D	November 21, 2023
RealClearPolitics	Lean D	August 5, 2024
Split Ticket	Likely D	October 30, 2024
538	Solid D	October 23, 2024

=== Endorsements ===
Martin Heinrich (D)

Organizations

- 314 Action
- End Citizens United
- Feminist Majority PAC
- Humane Society Legislative Fund
- Jewish Democratic Council of America
- Joint Action Committee for Political Affairs
- J Street PAC
- League of Conservation Voters
- Natural Resources Defense Council
- Planned Parenthood Action Fund
- Population Connection Action Fund

Labor unions

- AFSCME Council 18
Nella Domenici (R)

Organizations

- National Republican Senatorial Committee

=== Fundraising ===
Campaign finance reports as of September 30, 2024
Candidate	Raised	Spent	Cash on hand
Martin Heinrich (D)	$12,502,263	$10,330,618	$2,826,618
Nella Domenici (R)	$4,777,524 (Note: $1,510,000 of this total was self-funded by Domenici)	$4,377,754	$399,769
Source: Federal Election Commission

=== Polling ===
Aggregate polls

Source of poll aggregation	Dates administered	Dates updated	Martin Heinrich (D)	Nella Domenici (R)	Undecided (Note: Calculated by taking the difference of 100% and all other candidates combined.)	Margin
FiveThirtyEight	through November 3, 2024	November 4, 2024	48.4%	38.9%	12.7%	Heinrich +9.5
RCP	June 13 – October 26, 2024	November 4, 2024	48.7%	39.3%	12.0%	Heinrich +9.4
270ToWin	October 22 – November 4, 2024	November 4, 2024	50.5%	44.5%	5.0%	Heinrich +6.0%
TheHill/DDHQ	through November 3, 2024	November 4, 2024	50.8%	43.1%	6.1%	Heinrich +7.7%
Average			49.6%	41.5%	8.9%	Heinrich +8.1%

Poll source	Date(s) administered	Sample size (Note: Key: A – all adults RV – registered voters LV – likely voters V – unclear)	Margin of error	Martin Heinrich (D)	Nella Domenici (R)	Other	Undecided
Victory Insights (R)	November 1–3, 2024	600 (LV)	–	50%	48%	–	1%
Research & Polling Inc. (Note: Poll sponsored by The Albuquerque Journal)	October 10–18, 2024	1,024 (LV)	± 3.1%	51%	40%	1% (Note: "Neither" with 1%)	7%
SurveyUSA (Note: Poll sponsored by KOB)	September 12–18, 2024	619 (LV)	± 5.4%	47%	34%	–	19%
Research & Polling Inc.	September 6–13, 2024	532 (LV)	± 4.2%	50%	38%	4% (Note: "Neither" with 4%)	9%
Redfield & Wilton Strategies (Note: Poll sponsored by The Daily Telegraph)	September 6–9, 2024	521 (LV)	± 3.9%	47%	37%	6% (Note: "Won't vote if these are the candidates" with 4%; and "Other" with 2%)	11%
Redfield & Wilton Strategies	August 25–28, 2024	488 (LV)	± 4.0%	43%	33%	4% (Note: "Won't vote if these are the candidates" with 2%; "Other" with 2%)	19%
Emerson College (Note: Poll sponsored by The Hill)	August 20–22, 2024	965 (RV)	± 3.1%	49%	37%	4% (Note: "Someone else" with 4%)	9%
Redfield & Wilton Strategies	August 12–15, 2024	453 (LV)	± 4.1%	42%	36%	7% (Note: "Won't vote if these are the candidates" with 5%; "Other" with 2%)	15%
Redfield & Wilton Strategies	July 31 – August 3, 2024	493 (LV)	± 4.1%	40%	34%	4% (Note: "Other" with 1%; "Won't vote if these are the candidates" with 3%)	21%
1892 Polling (R) (Note: Poll sponsored by the National Republican Senatorial Committee, which supports Domenici)	June 19–24, 2024	600 (LV)	± 4.0%	46%	42%	–	10%
Public Policy Polling (D) (Note: Poll sponsored by New Mexico Political Report)	June 13–14, 2024	555 (V)	± 4.2%	47%	40%	–	13%
Red Oak Strategies (R)	May 7–19, 2024	1,800 (LV)	± 2.3%	41%	38%	–	21%
1892 Polling (R)	March 2024	600 (LV)	± 4.0%	48%	36%	–	–

=== Results ===
2024 United States Senate election in New Mexico
Party	Candidate	Votes	%	±%
Democratic	Martin Heinrich (incumbent)	497,333	55.06%	+0.97%
Republican	Nella Domenici	405,978	44.94%	+14.41%
Total votes		903,311	100.00%	N/A
Democratic hold				

==== By county ====
County	Martin Heinrich Democratic		Nella Domenici Republican		Margin		Total votes cast
County	#	%	#	%	#	%	Total votes cast
Bernalillo	187,163	61.42%	117,575	38.58%	69,588	22.84%	304,738
Catron	615	26.84%	1,676	73.16%	-1,061	-46.31%	2,291
Chaves	6,723	31.10%	14,891	68.90%	-8,168	-37.79%	21,614
Cibola	4,955	56.59%	3,801	43.41%	1,154	13.18%	8,756
Colfax	2,706	47.17%	3,031	52.83%	-325	-5.66%	5,737
Curry	4,532	30.81%	10,176	69.19%	-5,644	-38.37%	14,708
De Baca	268	31.42%	585	68.58%	-317	-37.16%	853
Doña Ana	46,715	56.24%	36,355	43.76%	10,360	12.47%	83,070
Eddy	5,979	26.28%	16,775	73.72%	-10,796	-47.45%	22,754
Grant	7,800	55.98%	6,133	44.02%	1,667	11.96%	13,933
Guadalupe	1,143	60.86%	735	39.14%	408	21.73%	1,878
Harding	138	32.86%	282	67.14%	-144	-34.29%	420
Hidalgo	785	44.48%	980	55.52%	-195	-11.05%	1,765
Lea	4,563	22.35%	15,852	77.65%	-11,289	-55.30%	20,415
Lincoln	3,270	32.78%	6,706	67.22%	-3,436	-34.44%	9,976
Los Alamos	7,761	64.00%	4,365	36.00%	3,396	28.01%	12,126
Luna	3,547	45.76%	4,205	54.24%	-658	-8.49%	7,752
McKinley	17,064	67.56%	8,195	32.44%	8,869	35.11%	25,259
Mora	1,532	63.89%	866	36.11%	666	27.77%	2,398
Otero	9,229	39.48%	14,147	60.52%	-4,918	-21.04%	23,376
Quay	1,174	32.79%	2,406	67.21%	-1,232	-34.41%	3,580
Rio Arriba	10,035	64.50%	5,524	35.50%	4,511	28.99%	15,559
Roosevelt	1,951	29.97%	4,559	70.03%	-2,608	-40.06%	6,510
San Juan	19,078	37.05%	32,417	62.95%	-13,339	-25.90%	51,495
San Miguel	7,447	68.48%	3,427	31.52%	4,020	36.97%	10,874
Sandoval	42,473	54.15%	35,959	45.85%	6,514	8.31%	78,432
Santa Fe	62,312	75.53%	20,183	24.47%	42,129	51.07%	82,495
Sierra	2,553	43.85%	3,269	56.15%	-716	-12.30%	5,822
Socorro	3,704	52.40%	3,365	47.60%	339	4.80%	7,069
Taos	12,457	76.40%	3,849	23.60%	8,608	52.79%	16,306
Torrance	2,454	34.78%	4,601	65.22%	-2,147	-30.43%	7,055
Union	397	24.39%	1,231	75.61%	-834	-51.23%	1,628
Valencia	14,810	45.34%	17,857	54.66%	-3,047	-9.33%	32,667
Totals	497,333	55.06%	405,978	44.94%	91,355	10.11%	903,311

Counties that flipped from Democratic to Republican

- Colfax (largest municipality: Raton)
- Hidalgo (largest municipality: Lordsburg)
- Luna (largest municipality: Deming)
- Valencia (largest municipality: Los Lunas)

==== By congressional district ====
Heinrich won all three congressional districts.

District	Heinrich	Domenici	Representative
1st	57%	43%	Melanie Stansbury
2nd	52%	48%	Gabe Vasquez
3rd	55%	45%	Teresa Leger Fernandez

== Notes ==
Partisan clients
