= United States Senate Energy Subcommittee on Public Lands, Forests, and Mining =

US Senate subcommittee of the Committee on Energy and Natural Resources

The United States Senate Energy and Natural Resources Subcommittee on Public Lands and Forests is one of four subcommittees of the U.S. Senate Energy and Natural Resources Committee.

== Jurisdiction ==
This subcommittee's jurisdiction includes oversight and legislative responsibilities for: public lands administered by the Bureau of Land Management and U.S. Forest Service including farming and grazing thereon, and wilderness areas; establishment of wildlife refuges on public lands and wilderness designation therein; military land withdrawals; reserved water rights; Alaska Native Claims Settlement Act; territorial affairs; national mining and minerals policy and general mining laws; surface mining, reclamation and enforcement; mining education and research; Federal mineral leasing; Outer Continental Shelf leasing; Naval oil shale reserves; National Petroleum Reserve–Alaska; and deep seabed mining.

== Members, 119th Congress ==
Majority	Minority
John Barrasso, Wyoming, Chair; Jim Risch, Idaho; Steve Daines, Montana; Tom Cotton, Arkansas; Jim Justice, West Virginia; Cindy Hyde-Smith, Mississippi; Lisa Murkowski, Alaska	Catherine Cortez Masto, Nevada, Ranking Member; Ron Wyden, Oregon; Mazie Hirono, Hawaii; Angus King, Maine; John Hickenlooper, Colorado; Alex Padilla, California
Ex officio
Mike Lee, Utah	Martin Heinrich, New Mexico

== Historical subcommittee rosters ==
=== 118th Congress ===
Majority	Minority
Catherine Cortez Masto, Nevada, Chair; Ron Wyden, Oregon; Martin Heinrich, New Mexico; Mazie Hirono, Hawaii; Angus King, Maine; John Hickenlooper, Colorado; Alex Padilla, California	Mike Lee, Utah, Ranking Member; Jim Risch, Idaho; Steve Daines, Montana; Lisa Murkowski, Alaska; Bill Cassidy, Louisiana; Josh Hawley, Missouri
Ex officio
Joe Manchin, West Virginia	John Barrasso, Wyoming

== See also ==
- U.S. House Natural Resources Subcommittee on National Parks, Forests and Public Lands
- U.S. House Natural Resources Subcommittee on Energy and Mineral Resources
