= United States Senate Committee on Energy and Natural Resources =

Standing committee of the United States Senate

Senate Energy Committee
Standing committee
- Active United States Senate; 119th Congress

History
- Formed: February 4, 1977
- Succeeded: Committee on Public Lands; Committee on Interior and Insular Affairs

Leadership
- Chair: Mike Lee (R); Since January 3, 2025
- Ranking Member: Martin Heinrich (D); Since January 3, 2025

Structure
- Seats: 20 members
- Political parties: Majority (11): Republican (11); Minority (9): Democratic (8); Independent (1)

Jurisdiction
- Policy areas: Alaska Natives, Coal mining, Energy industry, Federal lands, Hydrocarbon exploration, Hydroelectricity, Irrigation, Insular areas, Mining, Natural resource management, Nuclear power, Native Americans, Native Hawaiians, Reclamation, Renewable energy, Territorial possessions, Water resources
- Oversight authority: Advanced Research Projects Agency-Energy, Bonneville Power Administration, Bureau of Indian Affairs, Bureau of Indian Education, Bureau of Land Management, Bureau of Ocean Energy Management, Bureau of Reclamation, Bureau of Safety and Environmental Enforcement, Department of Energy, Department of the Interior, Energy Information Administration, Federal Energy Regulatory Commission, Office of Insular Affairs, National Nuclear Security Administration, National Park Service, Southeastern Power Administration, Southwestern Power Administration, Western Area Power Administration, United States Forest Service, United States Geological Survey
- House counterpart: Committee on Energy and Commerce Committee; Committee on Natural Resources; Committee on Science, Space, and Technology

Subcommittees
- Energy; National Parks; Public Lands, Forests, and Mining; Water and Power

Meeting place
- 304 Dirksen Senate Office Building; Washington, D.C.

Website
- www.energy.senate.gov

Rules
- Rule XXV.1.(g), Standing Rules of the Senate; Rules of the Committee on Energy and Natural Resources

The United States Senate Committee on Energy and Natural Resources is a standing committee of the United States Senate. It has jurisdiction over matters related to energy and mineral resources, including nuclear development; irrigation and reclamation, territorial possessions of the United States, trust lands appertaining to America's indigenous peoples, and the conservation, use, and disposition of federal lands. Its roots go back to the Committee on Interior and Insulars Affairs. In 1977, it became the Committee on Energy and Natural Resources, and most matters regarding Native Americans, Alaska Natives, and Native Hawaiians were removed from its jurisdiction and transferred to the Committee on Indian Affairs.

== History ==
The Committee on Public Lands was created in 1816 during the 14th Congress chaired by senator Jeremiah Morrow. In its early years, it managed the settlement of the recently purchased Missouri Territory. Over time, the committee oversaw the western expansion of the United States, including the Texas annexation, the Oregon Treaty, the Mexican Cession, and the Gadsden Purchase. The Homestead Act of 1860, which would have benefited western settlers and migrants, was a result of jurisdiction of the Public Lands Committee.

In 1849, the Department of the Interior was established, with the Public Lands Committee serving as legislative oversight. The committee became responsible for enacting legislation to conserve nature and its resources. Due to the actions of the committee, Congress began working towards preservation of forests, wilderness, and historical landmarks with the signing of the Antiquities Act in 1906 and the establishment of the National Park Service in 1916.

The committee has gone under a number of name changes, but the functions and policy have remained similar to its creation. In 1921, the committee merged with the Committee on Geological Surveys to become the Committee of Public Lands and Surveys. Following the Legislative Reorganization Act of 1946, it became the Committee on Interior and Insular Affairs, absorbing the jurisdiction of the Indian Affairs, Territorial and Insular Affairs, Mines and Mining, and Irrigation and Reclamation committees. Its most recent iteration, the Committee on Energy and Natural Resources, was established on February 4, 1977, after the Committee System Reorganization Amendments of 1977.

== Jurisdiction ==
In accordance of Rule XXV of the United States Senate, all proposed legislation, messages, petitions, memorials, and other matters relating to the following subjects is referred to the Senate Committee on Energy and Natural Resources:

1. Coal production, distribution, and utilization;
2. Energy policy;
3. Energy regulation and conservation;
4. Energy related aspects of deepwater ports;
5. Energy research and development;
6. Extraction of minerals from oceans and Outer Continental Shelf lands;
7. Hydroelectric power, irrigation, and reclamation;
8. Mining education and research;
9. Mining, mineral lands, mining claims, and mineral conservation;
10. National parks, recreation areas, wilderness areas, wild and scenic rivers, historical sites, military parks and battlefields, and on the public domain, preservation of prehistoric ruins and objects of interest;
11. National Petroleum Reserve;
12. Nonmilitary development of nuclear energy;
13. Oil and gas production and distribution;
14. Public lands and forests, including farming and grazing thereon, and mineral extraction therefrom;
15. Solar energy systems; and,
16. Territorial possessions of the United States, including trusteeships.

The Committee is also charged to "study and review, on a comprehensive basis, matters relating to energy and resources development, and report thereon from time to time."

== Members, 119th Congress ==
Majority	Minority
Mike Lee, Utah, Chair; John Barrasso, Wyoming; Jim Risch, Idaho; Steve Daines, Montana; Tom Cotton, Arkansas; Dave McCormick, Pennsylvania; Jim Justice, West Virginia (from January 14, 2025); Bill Cassidy, Louisiana; Cindy Hyde-Smith, Mississippi; Lisa Murkowski, Alaska; John Hoeven, North Dakota	Martin Heinrich, New Mexico, Ranking Member; Ron Wyden, Oregon; Maria Cantwell, Washington; Mazie Hirono, Hawaii; Angus King, Maine; Catherine Cortez Masto, Nevada; John Hickenlooper, Colorado; Alex Padilla, California; Ruben Gallego, Arizona

== Subcommittees ==
Subcommittee	Chair	Ranking Member
Energy	Dave McCormick (R-PA)	Ruben Gallego (D-AZ)
National Parks	Steve Daines (R-MT)	Angus King (I-ME)
Public Lands, Forests and Mining	John Barrasso (R-WY)	Catherine Cortez Masto (D-NV)
Water and Power	John Hoeven (R-ND)	Ron Wyden (D-OR)

== Chairs ==
=== Committee on Public Lands, 1816–1921 ===
Name	Party	State	Start	End
Jeremiah Morrow	Democratic-Republican	OH	1816	1819
Thomas Williams	Democratic-Republican	MS	1819	1820
Jesse Thomas	Democratic-Republican	IL	1819	1823
David Barton	Democratic-Republican (1823–1825)	MO	1823	1831
David Barton	National Republican (1825–1831)	MO	1823	1831
William King	Jacksonian	AL	1831	1832
Elias Kane	Jacksonian	IL	1832	1833
George Poindexter	Whig	MS	1833	1835
Thomas Ewing	Whig	OH	1835	1836
Robert Walker	Jacksonian (1836–1837)	MS	1836	1841
Robert Walker	Democratic (1837–1841)	MS	1836	1841
Oliver Smith	Whig	IN	1841	1843
William Woodbridge	Whig	MI	1843	1845
Sidney Breese	Democratic	IL	1845	1849
Alpheus Felch	Democratic	MI	1849	1853
Solon Borland	Democratic	AR	1853	
Augustus Dodge	Democratic	IA	1853	1855
Charles Stuart	Democratic	MI	1855	1859
Robert Johnson	Democratic	AR	1859	1861
James Harlan	Republican	IA	1861	1865
Samuel Pomeroy	Republican	KS	1865	1873
William Sprague	Republican	RI	1873	1875
Richard Oglesby	Republican	IL	1875	1879
Joseph McDonald	Republican	IN	1879	1881
Preston Plumb	Republican	KS	1881	1891
Joseph Dolph	Republican	OR	1891	1893
James Berry	Democratic	AR	1893	1895
Fred Dubois	Republican	ID	1895	1897
Henry Hansbrough	Republican	ND	1897	1908
Knute Nelson	Republican	MN	1908	1912
Reed Smoot	Republican	UT	1912	1913
George Chamberlain	Democratic	OR	1913	1915
Henry Myers	Democratic	MT	1915	1919
Reed Smoot	Republican	UT	1919	1921

=== Committee on Public Lands and Surveys, 1921–1947 ===
Name	Party	State	Start	End
Reed Smoot	Republican	UT	1921	1923
Irvine Lenroot	Republican	WI	1923	1924
Edwin Ladd	Republican	ND	1924	
Robert Stanfield	Republican	OR	1924	1927
Gerald Nye	Republican	ND	1927	1933
John Kendrick	Democratic	WY	1933	
Robert Wagner	Democratic	NY	1933	1937
Alva Adams	Democratic	CO	1937	1941
Carl Hatch	Democratic	NM	1941	1947

=== Committee on Public Lands, 1947–1948 ===
Name	Party	State	Start	End
Hugh Butler	Republican	NE	1947	1948

=== Committee on Interior and Insular Affairs, 1948–1977 ===
Name	Party	State	Start	End
Hugh Butler	Republican	NE	1948	1949
Joseph O'Mahoney	Democratic	WY	1949	1953
Hugh Butler	Republican	NE	1953	1954
Guy Cordon	Republican	OR	1954	1955
James Murray	Democratic	MT	1955	1961
Clinton Anderson	Democratic	NM	1961	1963
Scoop Jackson	Democratic	WA	1963	1977

=== Committee on Energy and Natural Resources, 1977–present ===
Name	Party	State	Start	End
Scoop Jackson	Democratic	WA	1977	1981
Jim McClure	Republican	ID	1981	1987
Bennett Johnston	Democratic	LA	1987	1995
Frank Murkowski	Republican	AK	1995	2001
Jeff Bingaman	Democratic	NM	2001	
Frank Murkowski	Republican	AK	2001	
Jeff Bingaman	Democratic	NM	2001	2003
Pete Domenici	Republican	NM	2003	2007
Jeff Bingaman	Democratic	NM	2007	2013
Ron Wyden	Democratic	OR	2013	2014
Mary Landrieu	Democratic	LA	2014	2015
Lisa Murkowski	Republican	AK	2015	2021
Joe Manchin	Democratic (2021–2024)	WV	2021	2025
Joe Manchin	Independent Democrat (2024–2025)	WV	2021	2025
Mike Lee	Republican	UT	2025	present

== Ranking members ==
Name	Party	State	Start	End
Carl Hatch	Democratic	NM	1947	1949
Hugh Butler	Republican	NE	1949	1953
James Murray	Democratic	MT	1953	1955
Eugene Millikin	Republican	CO	1955	1957
George Malone	Republican	NV	1957	1959
Henry Dworshak	Republican	IN	1959	1963
Thomas Kuchel	Republican	CA	1963	1969
Gordon Allott	Republican	CO	1969	1973
Paul Fannin	Republican	AZ	1973	1977
Clifford Hansen	Republican	WY	1977	1979
Mark Hatfield	Republican	OR	1979	1981
Scoop Jackson	Democratic	WA	1981	1983
Bennett Johnston	Democratic	LA	1983	1987
Jim McClure	Republican	ID	1987	1991
Malcolm Wallop	Republican	WY	1991	1995
Bennett Johnston	Democratic	LA	1995	1997
Dale Bumpers	Democratic	AR	1997	1999
Jeff Bingaman	Democratic	NM	1999	2001
Frank Murkowski	Republican	AK	2001	2003
Jeff Bingaman	Democratic	NM	2003	2007
Pete Domenici	Republican	NM	2007	2009
Lisa Murkowski	Republican	AK	2009	2015
Maria Cantwell	Democratic	WA	2015	2019
Joe Manchin	Democratic	WV	2019	2021
John Barrasso	Republican	WY	2021	2025
Martin Heinrich	Democratic	NM	2025	present

== Historical committee rosters ==
=== 118th Congress ===
Majority	Minority
Joe Manchin, West Virginia, Chair; Ron Wyden, Oregon; Maria Cantwell, Washington; Bernie Sanders, Vermont; Martin Heinrich, New Mexico; Mazie Hirono, Hawaii; Angus King, Maine; Catherine Cortez Masto, Nevada; Mark Kelly, Arizona (until October 17, 2023); John Hickenlooper, Colorado; Alex Padilla, California (from October 17, 2023)	John Barrasso, Wyoming, Ranking Member; Jim Risch, Idaho; Mike Lee, Utah; Steve Daines, Montana; Lisa Murkowski, Alaska; John Hoeven, North Dakota; Bill Cassidy, Louisiana; Cindy Hyde-Smith, Mississippi; Josh Hawley, Missouri

Subcommittees

Subcommittee	Chair	Ranking Member
Energy	Bernie Sanders (I-VT)	Josh Hawley (R-MO)
National Parks	Angus King (I-ME)	Steve Daines (R-MT)
Public Lands, Forests and Mining	Catherine Cortez Masto (D-NV)	Mike Lee (R-UT)
Water and Power	Ron Wyden (D-OR)	Jim Risch (R-ID)

=== 117th Congress ===
Majority	Minority
Joe Manchin, West Virginia, Chair; Maria Cantwell, Washington; Ron Wyden, Oregon; Bernie Sanders, Vermont; Martin Heinrich, New Mexico; Mazie Hirono, Hawaii; Angus King, Maine; Catherine Cortez Masto, Nevada; Mark Kelly, Arizona; John Hickenlooper, Colorado	John Barrasso, Wyoming, Ranking Member; Jim Risch, Idaho; Mike Lee, Utah; Steve Daines, Montana; Lisa Murkowski, Alaska; John Hoeven, North Dakota; James Lankford, Oklahoma; Bill Cassidy, Louisiana; Cindy Hyde-Smith, Mississippi; Roger Marshall, Kansas

Subcommittees

Subcommittee	Chair	Ranking Member
Energy	Mazie Hirono (D-HI)	John Hoeven (R-ND)
National Parks	Angus King (I-ME)	Steve Daines (R-MT)
Public Lands, Forests and Mining	Catherine Cortez Masto (D-NV)	Mike Lee (R-UT)
Water and Power	Ron Wyden (D-OR)	Cindy Hyde-Smith (R-MS)

=== 116th Congress ===
Majority	Minority
Lisa Murkowski, Alaska, Chair; John Barrasso, Wyoming; Jim Risch, Idaho; Mike Lee, Utah; Steve Daines, Montana; Cory Gardner, Colorado; Lamar Alexander, Tennessee; John Hoeven, North Dakota; Bill Cassidy, Louisiana; Cindy Hyde-Smith, Mississippi; Martha McSally, Arizona (until December 2, 2020)	Joe Manchin, West Virginia, Ranking Member; Maria Cantwell, Washington; Ron Wyden, Oregon; Bernie Sanders, Vermont; Debbie Stabenow, Michigan; Martin Heinrich, New Mexico; Mazie Hirono, Hawaii; Angus King, Maine; Catherine Cortez Masto, Nevada

Subcommittees

Subcommittee	Chair	Ranking Member
Energy	Bill Cassidy (R-LA)	Martin Heinrich (D-NM)
National Parks	Steve Daines (R-MT)	Angus King (I-ME)
Public Lands, Forests and Mining	Mike Lee (R-UT)	Ron Wyden (D-OR)
Water and Power	Martha McSally (R-AZ) (until December 2, 2020)	Catherine Cortez Masto (D-NV)

=== 115th Congress ===
Majority	Minority
Lisa Murkowski, Alaska, Chair; John Barrasso, Wyoming; Jim Risch, Idaho; Mike Lee, Utah; Steve Daines, Montana; Cory Gardner, Colorado; Lamar Alexander, Tennessee; John Hoeven, North Dakota; Bill Cassidy, Louisiana; Rob Portman, Ohio; Shelley Moore Capito, West Virginia	Maria Cantwell, Washington, Ranking Member; Ron Wyden, Oregon; Bernie Sanders, Vermont; Debbie Stabenow, Michigan; Al Franken, Minnesota (until January 2, 2018); Joe Manchin, West Virginia; Martin Heinrich, New Mexico; Mazie Hirono, Hawaii; Angus King, Maine; Tammy Duckworth, Illinois; Catherine Cortez Masto, Nevada; Tina Smith, Minnesota (from January 9, 2018)

Subcommittees

Subcommittee	Chair	Ranking Member
Energy	Cory Gardner (R-CO)	Joe Manchin (D-WV)
National Parks	Steve Daines (R-MT)	Mazie Hirono (D-HI)
Public Lands, Forests and Mining	Mike Lee (R-UT)	Ron Wyden (D-OR)
Water and Power	Jeff Flake (R-AZ)	Angus King (I-ME)

== See also ==
- List of United States Senate committees
- United States House Committee on Public Lands, predecessor of the United States House Committee on Resources
