= United States Senate Energy Subcommittee on National Parks =

Senate Energy and Natural Resources Subcommittee on National Parks is one of four subcommittees of the U.S. Senate Energy and Natural Resources Committee.

== Jurisdiction ==
This subcommittee's jurisdiction includes oversight and legislative responsibilities for: the National Park System; Wild and Scenic Rivers System; National Trails System; national recreation areas; national monuments; historic sites; military parks and battlefields; Land and Water Conservation Fund; historic preservation; outdoor recreation resources; and preservation of prehistoric ruins and objects of interest on the public domain.

== Members, 119th Congress ==
| Majority | Minority |
|---|---|
| Steve Daines, Montana, Chair; John Barrasso, Wyoming; Bill Cassidy, Louisiana; Lisa Murkowski, Alaska | Angus King, Maine, Ranking Member; Mazie Hirono, Hawaii; Ruben Gallego, Arizona |
Ex officio
| Mike Lee, Utah | Martin Heinrich, New Mexico |

== Historical subcommittee rosters ==
=== 118th Congress ===
| Majority | Minority |
|---|---|
| Angus King, Maine, Chair; Bernie Sanders, Vermont; Martin Heinrich, New Mexico; Mazie Hirono, Hawaii; Alex Padilla, California | Steve Daines, Montana, Ranking Member; Mike Lee, Utah; Lisa Murkowski, Alaska; Cindy Hyde-Smith, Mississippi |
Ex officio
| Joe Manchin, West Virginia | John Barrasso, Wyoming |

== See also ==
- U.S. House Natural Resources Subcommittee on National Parks, Forests and Public Lands
