= Martin Heinrich =

American politician and businessman (born 1971)

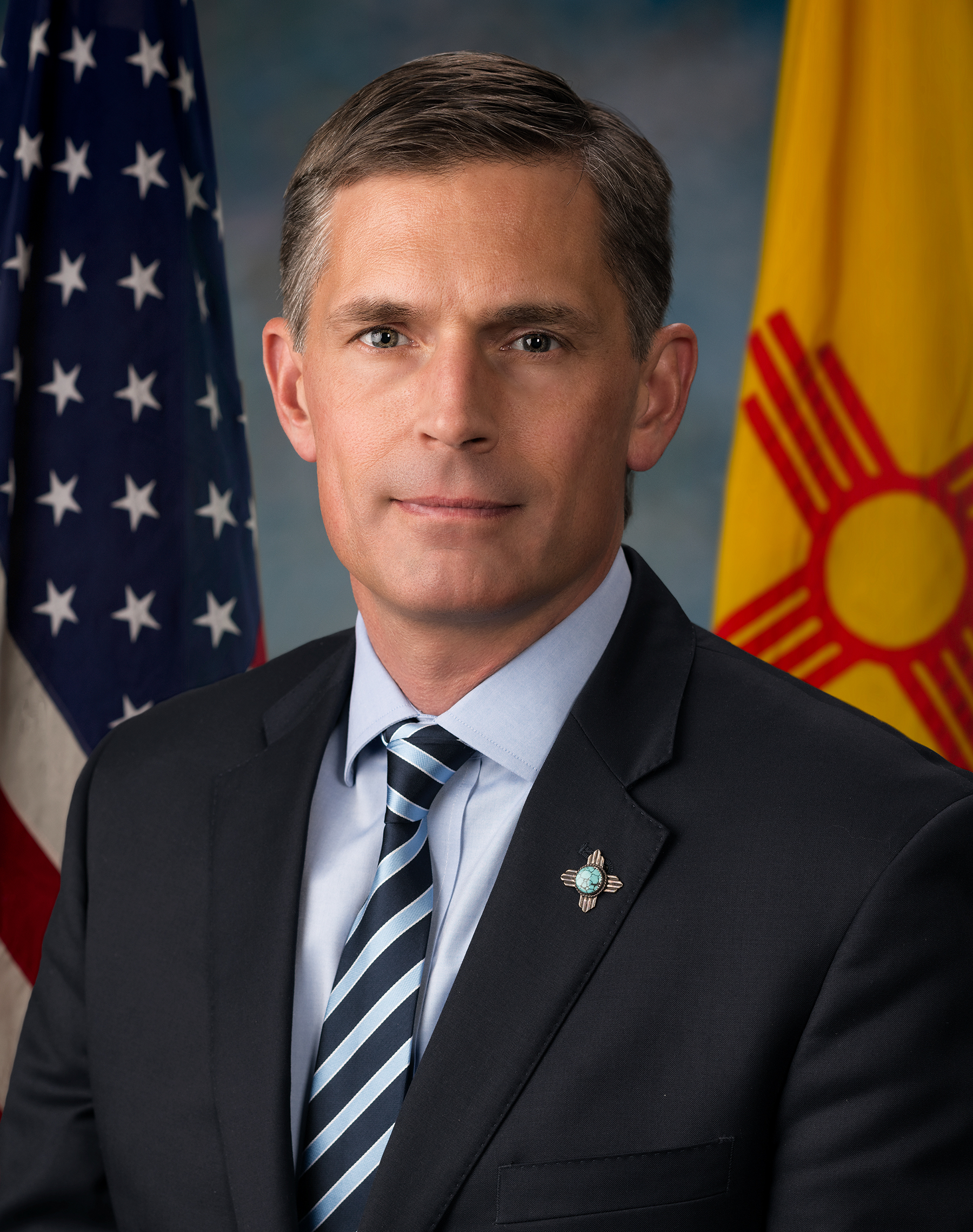
- Official portrait, 2019

United States Senator from New Mexico
- Incumbent
- Assumed office January 3, 2013 Serving with Ben Ray Luján
- Preceded by: Jeff Bingaman
Committee positions
Ranking Member of the Senate Energy Committee
Incumbent
Assumed office January 3, 2025
| Preceded by | John Barrasso |
Chair of the Joint Economic Committee
In office April 26, 2023 – January 3, 2025
| Preceded by | Don Beyer |
| Succeeded by | David Schweikert |
Vice Chair of the Joint Economic Committee
In office February 3, 2021 – April 26, 2023
| Preceded by | Don Beyer |
| Succeeded by | David Schweikert |

Member of the U.S. House of Representatives from New Mexico's 1st district
- In office January 3, 2009 – January 3, 2013
- Preceded by: Heather Wilson
- Succeeded by: Michelle Lujan Grisham

Member of the Albuquerque City Council from the 6th district
- In office January 3, 2004 – January 3, 2008
- Preceded by: Hess Yntema
- Succeeded by: Rey Garduno

Personal details
- Born: Martin Trevor Heinrich; October 17, 1971 (age 55) Fallon, Nevada, U.S.
- Party: Democratic
- Spouse: Julie Hicks (m. 1998)
- Children: 2
- Education: University of Missouri (BS); University of New Mexico (attended)
- Website: Senate website Campaign website
- Heinrich's voice Heinrich supporting the Continental Divide Trail Completion Act. Recorded December 1, 2022

Martin Trevor Heinrich (/ˈhaɪnrɪk/ HYNE-rik; born October 17, 1971) is an American politician serving as the senior United States senator from New Mexico, a seat he has held since 2013. A member of the Democratic Party, Heinrich served as the U.S. representative from New Mexico's 1st congressional district from 2009 to 2013. He and fellow senator Ben Ray Luján are the co-deans of New Mexico's congressional delegations.

Born in Fallon, Nevada, Heinrich resides in Albuquerque, New Mexico. From 2004 to 2008, he served on the Albuquerque City Council, representing the 6th district. Heinrich was elected to the U.S. House of Representatives in 2008 and reelected in 2010.

In lieu of running for a third term in the House, Heinrich ran for the Senate seat vacated by retiring senator Jeff Bingaman in the 2012 election and defeated Republican Heather Wilson, 51%–45%. He was reelected in 2018 and 2024. During the 118th Congress, Heinrich chaired the Joint Economic Committee, having previously served as vice chair. In January 2021, Heinrich became New Mexico's senior senator when Tom Udall retired from the Senate.

== Early life and education ==
Martin Trevor Heinrich was born in Fallon, near Carson City, Nevada. He is the son of seamstress Shirley A. (née Bybee) and Pete C. Heinrich, a utility company lineman. His father was born in Waldenburg, Germany, as Heinrich Peter Karl Cordes and later took his stepfather Olaf Heinrich's surname. When he was naturalized as an American citizen in 1955, he changed his name again to Pete Carl Heinrich. Raised as a Lutheran, Martin Heinrich grew up in Cole Camp, Missouri. He attended public schools in Cole Camp, then moved to Columbia, Missouri, in 1989 to attend the University of Missouri. He graduated in 1995 with a Bachelor of Science in mechanical engineering. He left Missouri for Albuquerque to take graduate courses at the University of New Mexico.

== Early career ==
After a brief stint doing mechanical drawings, Heinrich worked as an AmeriCorps fellow in New Mexico.

From 1996 to 2001 Heinrich served as executive director of the Cottonwood Gulch Foundation, a New Mexico nonprofit organization dedicated to educating young people on natural science and the environment. In 2002 he founded his own public affairs consulting firm.

Heinrich served on the Albuquerque City Council from 2004 to 2008, including one term as city council president in 2006. As a city councilman, he said his goals were to reduce crime, raise the minimum wage and create new jobs. He also advocated the use of wind and solar power.

In February 2006 Governor Bill Richardson appointed Heinrich to be the state's Natural Resources Trustee.

== U.S. House of Representatives ==
=== Elections ===
==== 2008 ====
In 2008 Heinrich filed papers to run in New Mexico's 1st congressional district, based in Albuquerque. He originally planned to challenge five-term Republican incumbent Heather Wilson, but Wilson retired to run for the U.S. Senate seat vacated by retiring Republican Pete Domenici. Heinrich won the Democratic primary on June 4, 2008, defeating New Mexico Secretary of State Rebecca Vigil-Giron, State Health Secretary Michelle Lujan Grisham, and U.S. Army veteran Robert Pidcock, 44–25–24–8%.

In the general election Heinrich faced Bernalillo County Sheriff Darren White, whom Heinrich's campaign focused on linking to President George W. Bush. Heinrich also called for energy independence and an end to the war in Iraq. He defeated White 56–44%, carrying three of the district's five counties: Bernalillo (56%), Sandoval (56%), and Valencia (53%); White won Santa Fe (64%) and Torrance (57%) counties. Heinrich is the first Democrat to represent the district, which had been in Republican hands since New Mexico was split into districts in 1969 but became increasingly friendly to Democrats, having gone Democratic in every presidential election since 1992.

==== 2010 ====
Heinrich was challenged by Republican Jon Barela, who told Politico he did not believe Heinrich reflected the district, saying he was too far left on budget and spending issues. During the 2010 campaign Roll Call reported that the Democratic Congressional Campaign Committee assigned a lobbyist to aid in the reelection campaigns of possibly vulnerable House members in fundraising, messaging and campaign strategy. Heinrich was elected to a second term, defeating Barela 52–48%, and carrying two of the district's counties: Bernalillo (53%) and Sandoval (51%). Barela won Santa Fe (67%), Torrance (61%), and Valencia (53%) counties.

=== Tenure ===
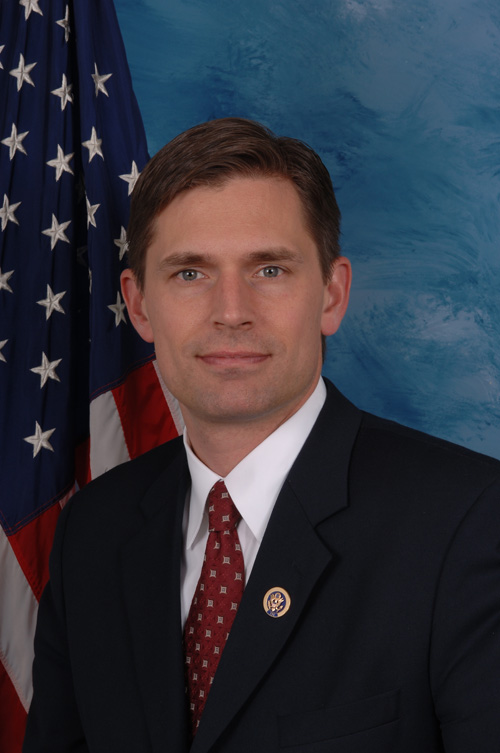
U.S. Representative Martin Heinrich during the 111th Congress

On January 14, 2009, the House Democratic freshmen elected Heinrich to a six-month term as their class president. He co-sponsored the Stop the Congressional Pay Raise Act, which would cancel an automatic $4,700 salary raise for members of Congress.

==== Health care ====
On March 21, 2010, Heinrich voted for the Patient Protection and Affordable Care Act (commonly called Obamacare or the Affordable Care Act). In 2017 he co-sponsored Medicare-For-All.

==== Abortion ====
NARAL Pro-Choice America PAC endorsed Heinrich in 2010.

Heinrich received a 100% score from NARAL in 2009.

==== Environment ====
Heinrich has identified as an environmentalist throughout his career. He served as executive director of the Cottonwood Gulch Foundation, a New Mexico nonprofit organization dedicated to educating young people on natural science and the environment, and founded his own public affairs consulting firm.

Later, as a member of the Albuquerque City Council, he advocated for the use of wind and solar power. In February 2006 Governor Bill Richardson appointed him to be the state's Natural Resources Trustee. He also served on the executive committee of the Sierra Club's Rio Grande Chapter. In August 2011 he received the Sierra Club's first endorsement of the 2012 election cycle. He opposes construction of the Keystone Pipeline. He supports cap-and-trade legislation. In April 2019 Heinrich was one of three Democratic senators who joined Republicans to vote to confirm David Bernhardt, a former oil executive, as Secretary of the Interior Department.

In late 2019, Heinrich was one of 14 senators to co-sponsor the Green New Deal, a policy introduced in the U.S. House of Representatives and U.S. Senate that would establish net-zero carbon emissions by 2050.

Heinrich was a member of the Senate Democrats' Special Committee on the Climate Crisis, which published a report of its findings in August 2020.

==== Same-sex marriage ====
After his 2012 Senate primary opponent, Hector Balderas, announced his support for same-sex marriage, Heinrich's staff released a statement to The New Mexico Independent newspaper stating, "Martin has supported gay marriage for some time. I just don't think he was asked about it. Thanks for asking!" He was an original cosponsor of Congressman Jerry Nadler's 2009 legislation to repeal the Defense of Marriage Act.

==== Gun law ====
Heinrich is an outdoorsman, hunter, gun owner, and former member of the National Rifle Association (NRA). The NRA endorsed him during the 2010 congressional election. At that time, the NRA gave him an A grade for his stance on Second Amendment rights. The NRA did not support Heinrich during his 2012 Senate campaign, and he has since donated their 2010 contribution to charity.

Heinrich opposed a bill that would have reinstated the Federal Assault Weapons Ban. He also supported bills to create a national standard for the concealed carrying of firearms across state lines, co-sponsored legislation that would ease the restrictions on the sales of firearms across state lines, and called for the repeal of the Dickey Amendment, which prevents government research into curbing gun violence. He supports banning bump stocks and banning sales to anyone on the federal no fly list.

==== Ojito Wilderness ====
In 2008, the New Mexico Republican Party criticized Heinrich for his work on the creation of the Ojito National Wilderness, which they said amounted to unregistered lobbying. Heinrich responded that the work was advocacy that did not require lobbying disclosure.

==== Armed forces ====
Heinrich was a member of the House Armed Services Committee. During his time in Congress he has maintained strong opposition to the war in Iraq, and supported a swift end of combat operations in Afghanistan. In 2011 he voted against the National Defense Authorization Act conference report because he objected to language requiring that suspected foreign terrorists be taken into custody by the military instead of civilian law enforcement authorities.

=== Committee assignments ===
- Committee on Appropriations
- Committee on Armed Services
  - Subcommittee on Tactical Air and Land Forces
  - Subcommittee on Strategic Forces
- Committee on Energy and Natural Resources
  - Subcommittee on Energy and Mineral Resources
  - Subcommittee on National Parks, Forests and Public Lands
- Select Committee on Intelligence

=== Caucus memberships ===
- Senate Taiwan Caucus

== U.S. Senate ==
=== Elections ===
==== 2012 ====
Heinrich announced that he would leave the House to run for the United States Senate seat held by Jeff Bingaman, who retired at the end of his term. In March, Politico reported that Al Gore had signed a fundraising letter for Heinrich. Heinrich defeated State Auditor Hector Balderas in the Democratic primary. He defeated Republican Heather Wilson, his predecessor in Congress, in the November 6 general election, 51% to 45%.

==== 2018 ====
Heinrich was reelected to a second term in 2018 over Republican Mick Rich and Libertarian Gary Johnson. He gained 54% of the vote to Rich's 30% and Johnson's 15%.

==== 2024 ====
Heinrich was elected to a third Senate term, defeating Republican nominee Nella Domenici with 55% of the vote.

=== Tenure ===
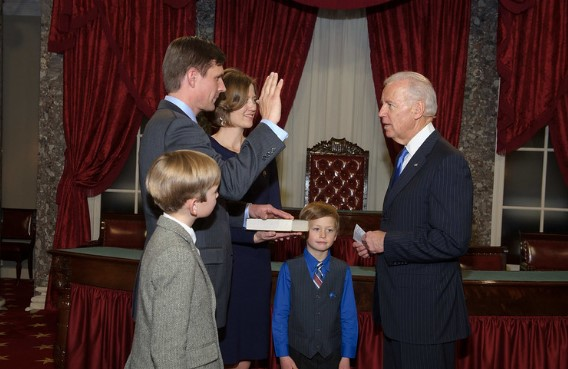
Heinrich being sworn in as a U.S. Senator by vice president Joe Biden, January 3, 2013

In 2014, Heinrich and Senator Jeff Flake traveled to Eru, a small island in the Marshall Islands. The Discovery Channel sent a film crew to document their trip and planned to air the footage on a show called "Rival Survival". Heinrich and Flake had to survive for six days with few resources, including no natural sources of drinkable water. After the trip, Heinrich told reporters that he and Flake, a Republican, did it to demonstrate that politicians from different parties can work together, in their case to survive.

In March 2019, Heinrich and Rob Portman co-founded the Senate Artificial Intelligence Caucus.

On April 15, 2020, the Trump administration invited Heinrich to join a bipartisan task force on reopening the economy amid the COVID-19 pandemic.

On July 19, 2024, Heinrich called for Joe Biden to withdraw from the 2024 United States presidential election.

In March 2026, Heinrich was one of only two Democratic senators to vote to advance the nomination of Markwayne Mullin as head of the Department of Homeland Security. Heinrich said he considered Mullin a friend.

Heinrich is a member of the Fight Club in the U.S. Senate.

==== Gun laws ====
On April 17, 2013, Heinrich voted to expand background checks for gun purchases, and against regulating assault weapons.

In response to the 2017 Las Vegas shooting, Heinrich said that Congress should pass legislation to combat gun violence.

==== Health care ====
On September 27, 2013, Heinrich voted to restore funding for the Affordable Care Act as part of an amendment to legislation funding government operations for 45 days, and which also omitted House-passed language prioritizing debt payments if Congress fails to increase the nation's borrowing limits.

==== January 6th ====
Heinrich was participating in the certification of the 2021 United States Electoral College vote count when Trump supporters stormed the U.S. Capitol. He left the chamber to make a phone call and saw that the rioters were overwhelming the Capitol Police. He returned to the chamber to tell people what he saw: "an out-of-control mob climbing over things, waving Confederate flags, just clearly bent on breaking into the west side of the Capitol." Along with other senators, Heinrich was evacuated from the Senate chamber to an undisclosed location. He called the attack an "assault on democracy" and blamed Trump for inciting it. In the wake of the attack, Heinrich said invoking the Twenty-fifth Amendment to the United States Constitution and/or impeachment should be used to remove Trump from office.

==== Election security ====
On December 21, 2017, Heinrich was one of six senators to introduce the Secure Elections Act, legislation authorizing block grants to states to update outdated voting technology as well as form a program for an independent panel of experts that would work to develop cybersecurity guidelines for election systems that states could implement, along with offering states resources to install the recommendations.

==== Energy ====
In February 2021, Heinrich was one of seven Democratic U.S. Senators to join Republicans in blocking a ban of hydraulic fracturing, commonly known as fracking.

==== Puerto Rico ====
On March 16, 2021, Heinrich introduced a bill to grant Puerto Rico statehood.

==== Foreign policy ====
In January 2024, Heinrich voted for a resolution proposed by Senator Bernie Sanders to apply the human rights provisions of the Foreign Assistance Act to U.S. aid to Israel's military. The proposal was defeated, 72 to 11. In November 2024, Heinrich was one of 19 senators to vote to block the United States' arms sales to Israel. In April 2025, Heinrich voted for a pair of resolutions Sanders proposed to cancel the Trump administration's sales of $8.8 billion in bombs and other munitions to Israel. The proposals were defeated, 82 to 15.

==== Potential Cabinet appointment ====
In November 2020, Heinrich was named a candidate for Secretary of the Interior in the Biden administration. This position ultimately went to fellow New Mexican Deb Haaland, who held the same House seat Heinrich held until his election to the Senate.

=== Committee assignments ===
Heinrich served on the following Senate committees in the 119th Congress:

- Committee on Appropriations
  - Subcommittee on Agriculture, Rural Development, Food and Drug Administration, and Related Agencies
  - Subcommittee on Energy and Water Development
  - Subcommittee on Interior, Environment, and Related Agencies
  - Subcommittee on the Legislative Branch (Ranking Member)
  - Subcommittee on Military Construction, Veterans Affairs, and Related Agencies
- Committee on Energy and Natural Resources (Ranking Member)
  - Subcommittee on Energy
  - Subcommittee on National Parks
  - Subcommittee on Public Lands, Forests and Mining
  - Subcommittee on Water and Power
- Select Committee on Intelligence
- Joint Economic Committee

== Personal life ==
Heinrich lives in Albuquerque, New Mexico, with his wife, Julie, and their two children. He is Lutheran.

== Electoral history ==
=== Albuquerque City Council ===
2003 Albuquerque City Council election, District 6
| Party | Candidate | Votes | % |
|---|---|---|---|
| Nonpartisan | Martin Heinrich | 2,342 | 39.85 |
| Nonpartisan | Johanna Tighe | 1,129 | 19.21 |
| Nonpartisan | Linda Doran | 758 | 12.90 |
| Nonpartisan | Bob Anderson | 620 | 10.55 |
| Nonpartisan | Dona Upson | 584 | 9.94 |
| Nonpartisan | Javier Martinez | 432 | 7.35 |
| Write-in | | 12 | 0.20 |
| Total votes | | 5,877 | 100.00 |

=== U.S. House of Representatives ===
2008 New Mexico's 1st congressional district election – Democratic primary
| Party | Candidate | Votes | % |
|---|---|---|---|
| Democratic | Martin Heinrich | 22,341 | 43.51 |
| Democratic | Rebecca Vigil-Giron | 12,660 | 24.66 |
| Democratic | Michelle Lujan Grisham | 12,074 | 23.51 |
| Democratic | Robert L. Pidcock | 4,273 | 8.32 |
| Total votes | | 51,348 | 100.00 |
| Majority | | 9,681 | 18.85 |

2008 New Mexico's 1st congressional district election
| Party | Candidate | Votes | % | ±% |
|---|---|---|---|---|
| Democratic | Martin Heinrich | 166,271 | 55.65 | ▲5.85 |
| Republican | Darren White | 132,485 | 44.35 | ▼5.85 |
| Total votes | | 298,756 | 100.00 | N/A |
| Majority | | 33,786 | 11.31 | ▲10.90 |
| Democratic gain from Republican | | | | |

2010 New Mexico's 1st congressional district election – Democratic primary
| Party | Candidate | Votes | % |
|---|---|---|---|
| Democratic | Martin Heinrich (incumbent) | 32,173 | 100.00 |
| Total votes | | 32,173 | 100.00 |

2010 New Mexico's 1st congressional district election
| Party | Candidate | Votes | % | ±% |
|---|---|---|---|---|
| Democratic | Martin Heinrich (incumbent) | 112,010 | 51.80 | ▼3.85 |
| Republican | Jon Barela | 104,215 | 48.20 | ▲3.85 |
| Total votes | | 216,225 | 100.00 | N/A |
| Majority | | 7,795 | 3.61 | ▼7.70 |
| Democratic hold | | | | |

=== U.S. Senate ===
2012 United States Senate election in New Mexico – Democratic primary
| Party | Candidate | Votes | % |
|---|---|---|---|
| Democratic | Martin Heinrich | 83,432 | 58.94 |
| Democratic | Hector Balderas | 58,128 | 41.06 |
| Total votes | | 141,560 | 100.00 |
| Majority | | 25,304 | 17.88 |

2012 United States Senate election in New Mexico
| Party | Candidate | Votes | % | ±% |
|---|---|---|---|---|
| Democratic | Martin Heinrich | 395,717 | 51.01 | ▼19.60 |
| Republican | Heather Wilson | 351,259 | 45.28 | ▲15.95 |
| Independent American | Jon Barrie | 28,199 | 3.63 | N/A |
| Independent | Robert L. Anderson (write-in) | 617 | 0.08 | N/A |
| Total votes | | 775,792 | 100.00 | N/A |
| Majority | | 44,458 | 5.73 | ▼35.54 |
| Democratic hold | | | | |

2018 United States Senate election in New Mexico – Democratic primary
| Party | Candidate | Votes | % |
|---|---|---|---|
| Democratic | Martin Heinrich (incumbent) | 152,145 | 100.00 |
| Total votes | | 152,145 | 100.00 |

2018 United States Senate election in New Mexico
| Party | Candidate | Votes | % | ±% |
|---|---|---|---|---|
| Democratic | Martin Heinrich (incumbent) | 376,998 | 54.09 | ▲3.08 |
| Republican | Mick Rich | 212,813 | 30.53 | ▼14.75 |
| Libertarian | Gary Johnson | 107,201 | 15.38 | N/A |
| Total votes | | 697,012 | 100.00 | N/A |
| Majority | | 164,185 | 23.56 | ▲17.83 |
| Democratic hold | | | | |

2024 United States Senate election in New Mexico – Democratic primary
| Party | Candidate | Votes | % |
|---|---|---|---|
| Democratic | Martin Heinrich (incumbent) | 122,961 | 100.00 |
| Total votes | | 122,961 | 100.00 |

2024 United States Senate election in New Mexico
| Party | Candidate | Votes | % | ±% |
|---|---|---|---|---|
| Democratic | Martin Heinrich (incumbent) | 497,333 | 55.06 | ▲0.97 |
| Republican | Nella Domenici | 405,978 | 44.94 | ▲14.41 |
| Total votes | | 903,311 | 100.00 | N/A |
| Democratic hold | | | | |

U.S. House of Representatives
| Preceded by Heather Wilson | Member of the U.S. House of Representatives from New Mexico's 1st congressional district 2009–2013 | Succeeded by Michelle Lujan Grisham |
Party political offices
| Preceded by Jeff Bingaman | Democratic nominee for U.S. Senator from New Mexico (Class 1); 2012, 2018, 2024 | Most recent |
U.S. Senate
| Preceded by Jeff Bingaman | United States Senator (Class 1) from New Mexico; 2013–present Served alongside: Tom Udall, Ben Ray Luján | Incumbent |
| Preceded by Don Beyer | Chair of the Joint Economic Committee; 2023–2025 | Succeeded by David Schweikert |
| Preceded by John Barrasso | Ranking Member of the Senate Energy Committee; 2025–present | Incumbent |
U.S. order of precedence (ceremonial)
| Preceded by Deb Fischer | Order of precedence of the United States as United States Senator | Succeeded by Mazie Hirono |
| Preceded by Mazie Hirono | United States senators by seniority 38th | Succeeded by Angus King |
