= Fight Club (U.S. Senate) =

Group of Senate Democrats

- Ideology: Progressivism; Left-wing populism
- Political position: Left-wing
- National affiliation: Democratic Party
- Seats in the Senate Democratic Caucus: 8 / 47
- Seats in the Senate: 8 / 100

The Fight Club is a left-wing populist faction of the Senate Democratic Caucus in the United States Senate. The Fight Club was founded to combat Democratic leadership and the establishment. The group is named after the movie, in reference to the "first rule of Fight Club" (to not talk publicly about the Fight Club), as their meetings were initially held in secret from leadership.

The Fight Club's members include Senators Martin Heinrich of New Mexico, Ed Markey and Elizabeth Warren of Massachusetts, Jeff Merkley of Oregon, Chris Murphy of Connecticut, Bernie Sanders of Vermont, Tina Smith of Minnesota, and Chris Van Hollen of Maryland.

The Fight Club was created to fight back against the Democratic leadership and establishment, specifically Senate Minority Leader Chuck Schumer and Chair of the Democratic Senatorial Campaign Committee Kirsten Gillibrand, who they believed were backing the wrong candidates and were using the wrong strategy to win the 2026 midterm elections.

== Purpose ==
The Senate Fight Club was founded to combat Senate Minority Leader Chuck Schumer and Chair of the Democratic Senatorial Campaign Committee Kirsten Gillibrand's 2026 midterm elections strategy. According to Vanity Fair, the club was also founded to press Congressional Democrats to oppose President Donald Trump more aggressively.

The New York Times writes that "The 'Fight Club' senators generally lean left of their Democratic peers in Congress, but their differences are less over ideology and more about attitude and political combativeness. They worry that leadership is using an obsolete playbook and risks dampening the party's energy and desire for new kinds of candidates." They believe that Schumer and Gillibrand's backing of "safe" and "establishment" candidates is the wrong choice for their party. The Fight Club's strategy is to back more populist and progressive candidates for the U.S. Senate. Its first move was endorsing Peggy Flanagan in the 2026 United States Senate election in Minnesota over Angie Craig, who reportedly had the private backing of the Democratic Senate leadership. Flanagan won the primary and the general election.

== Members ==
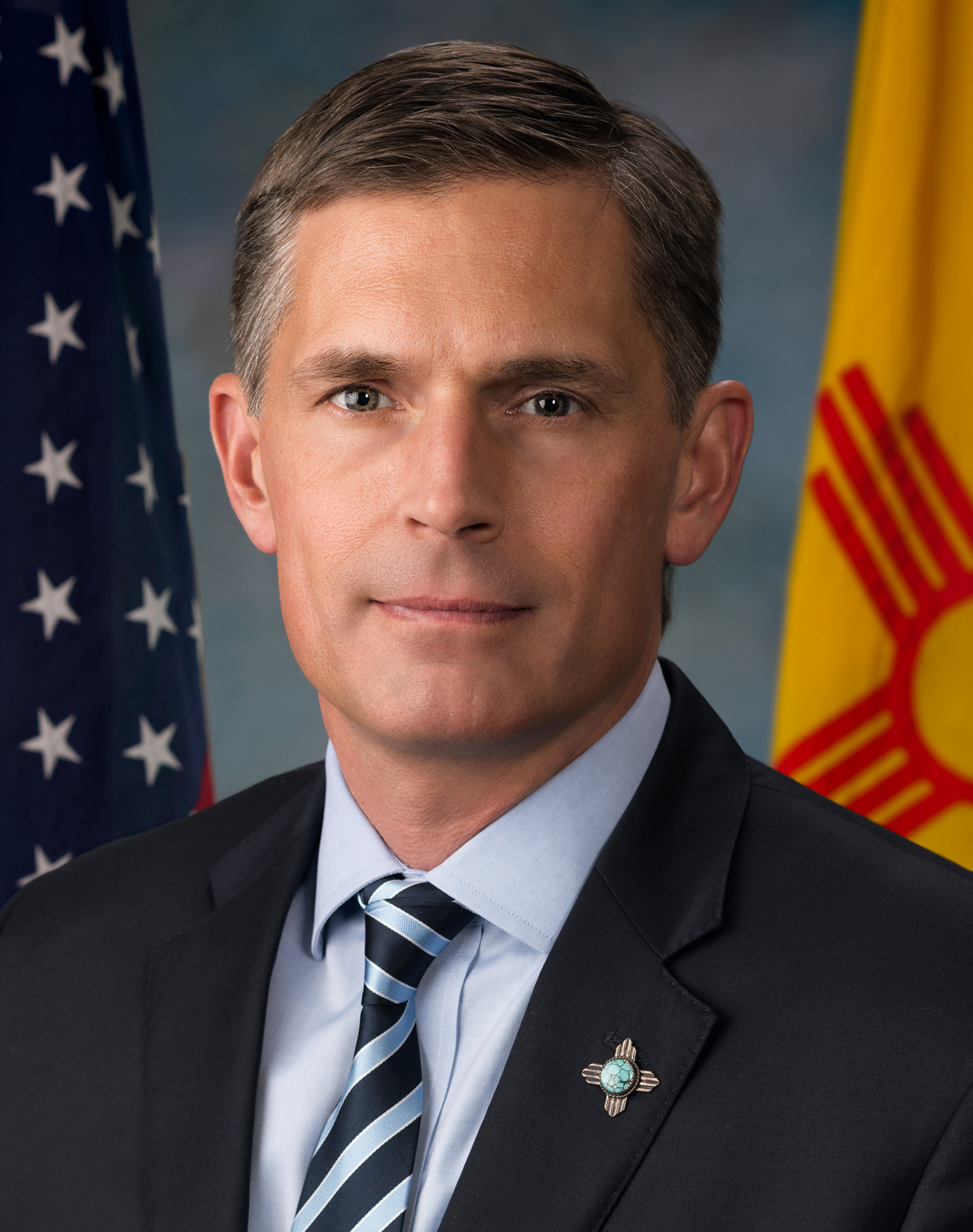
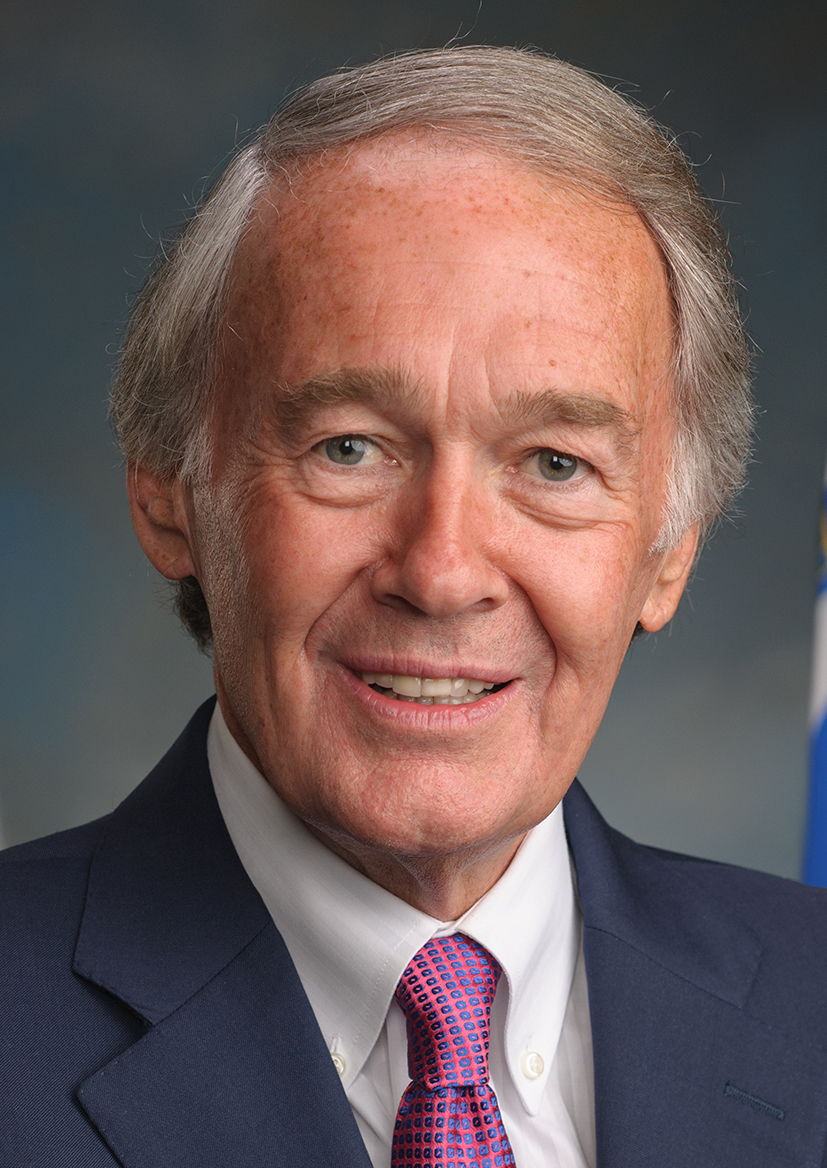
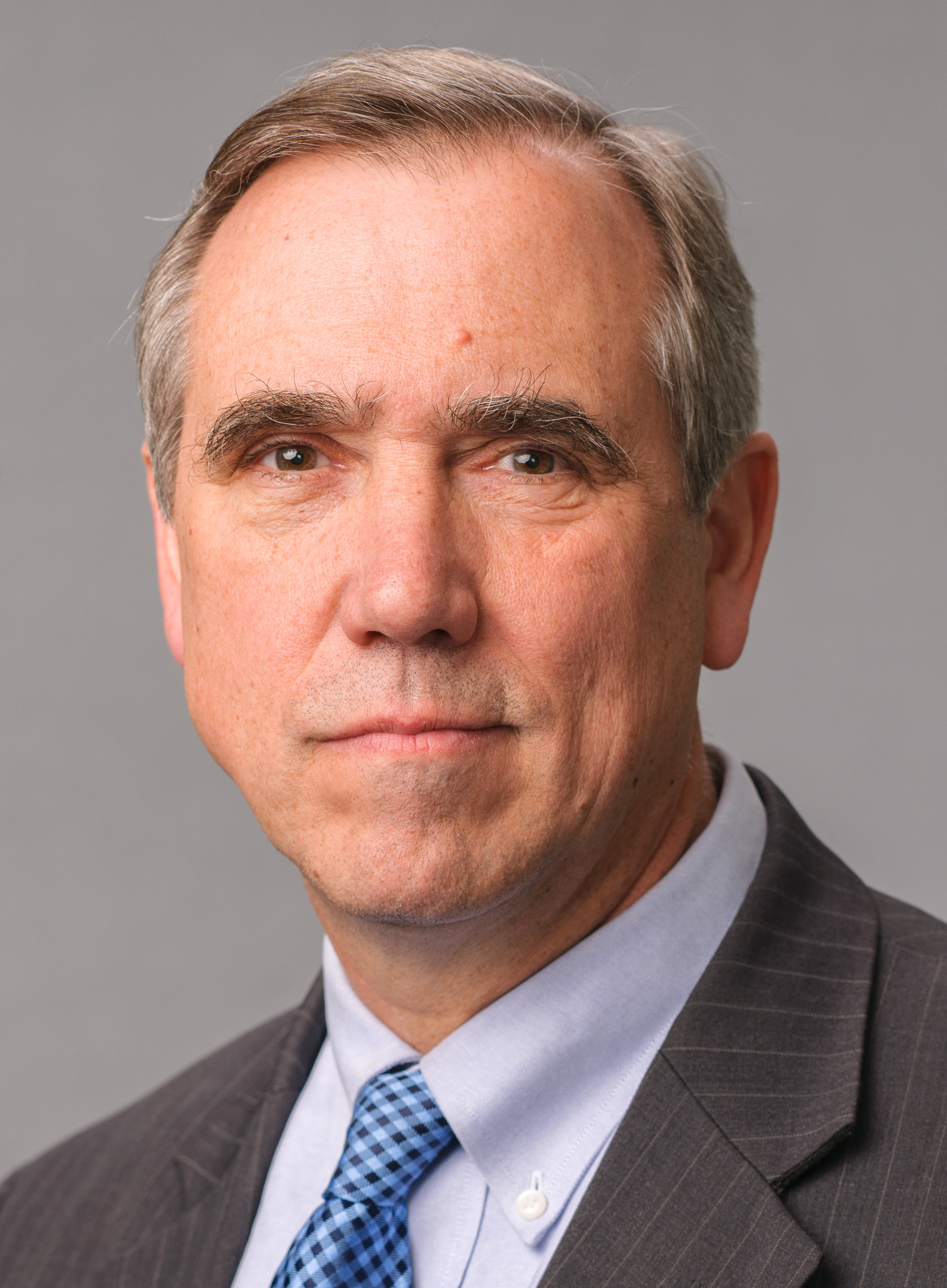
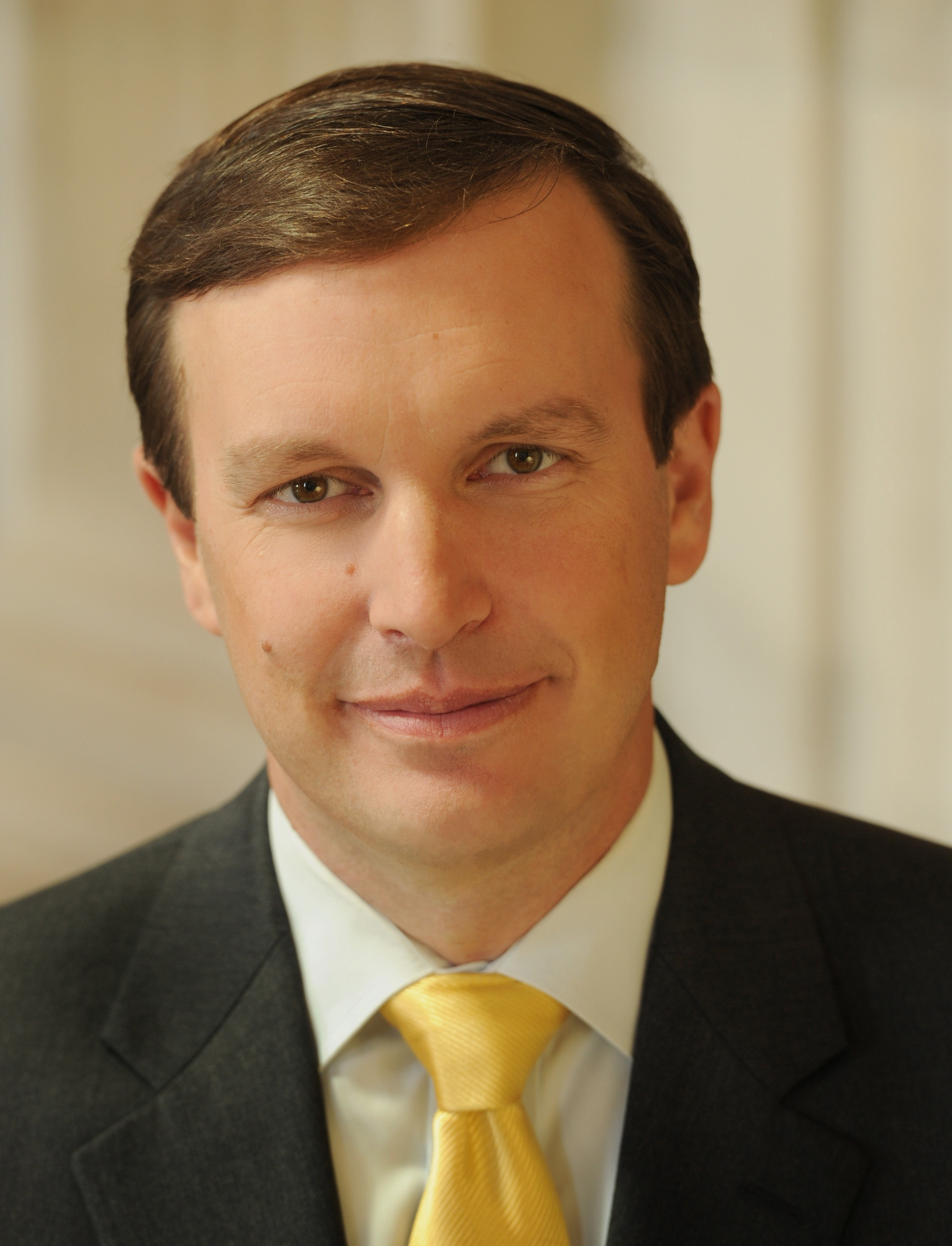
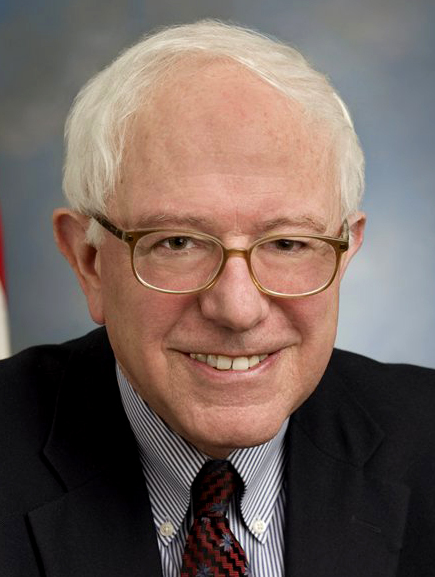
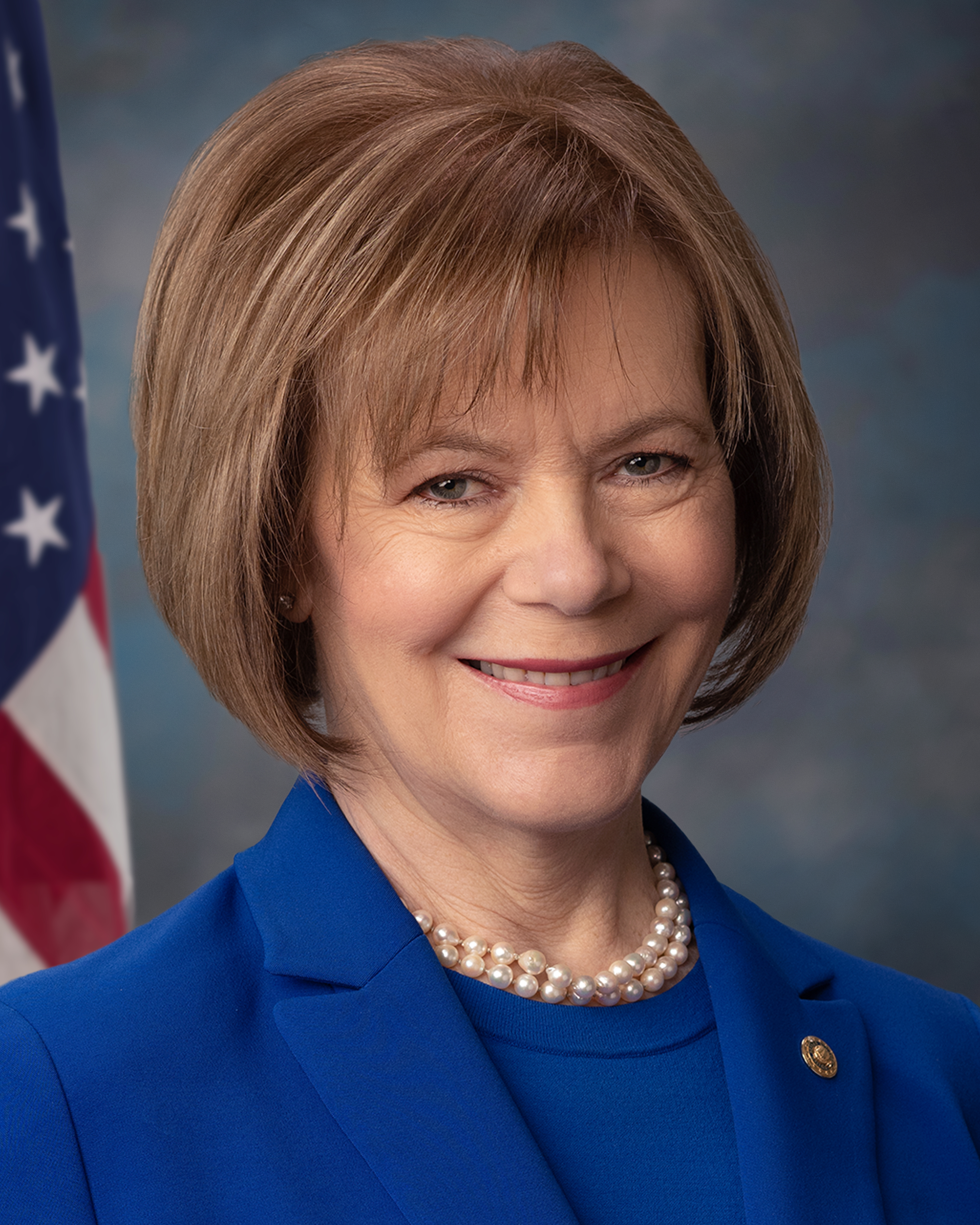
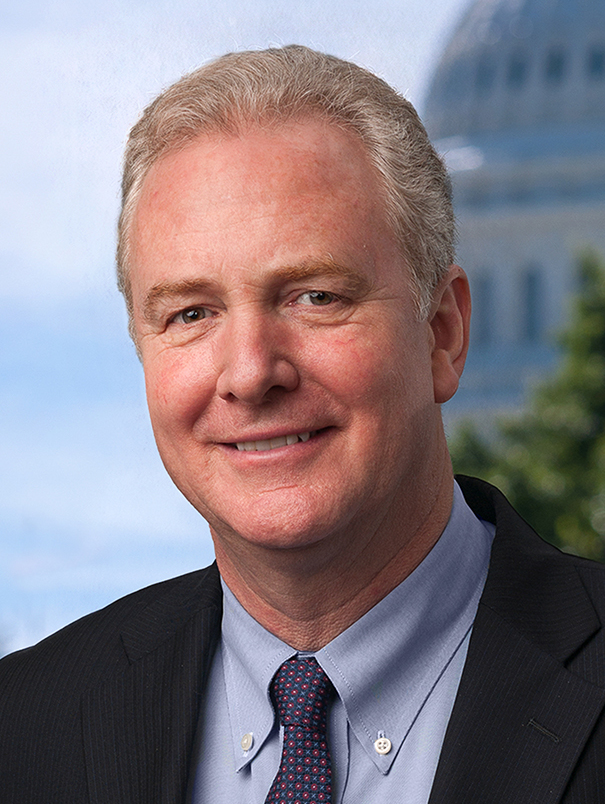
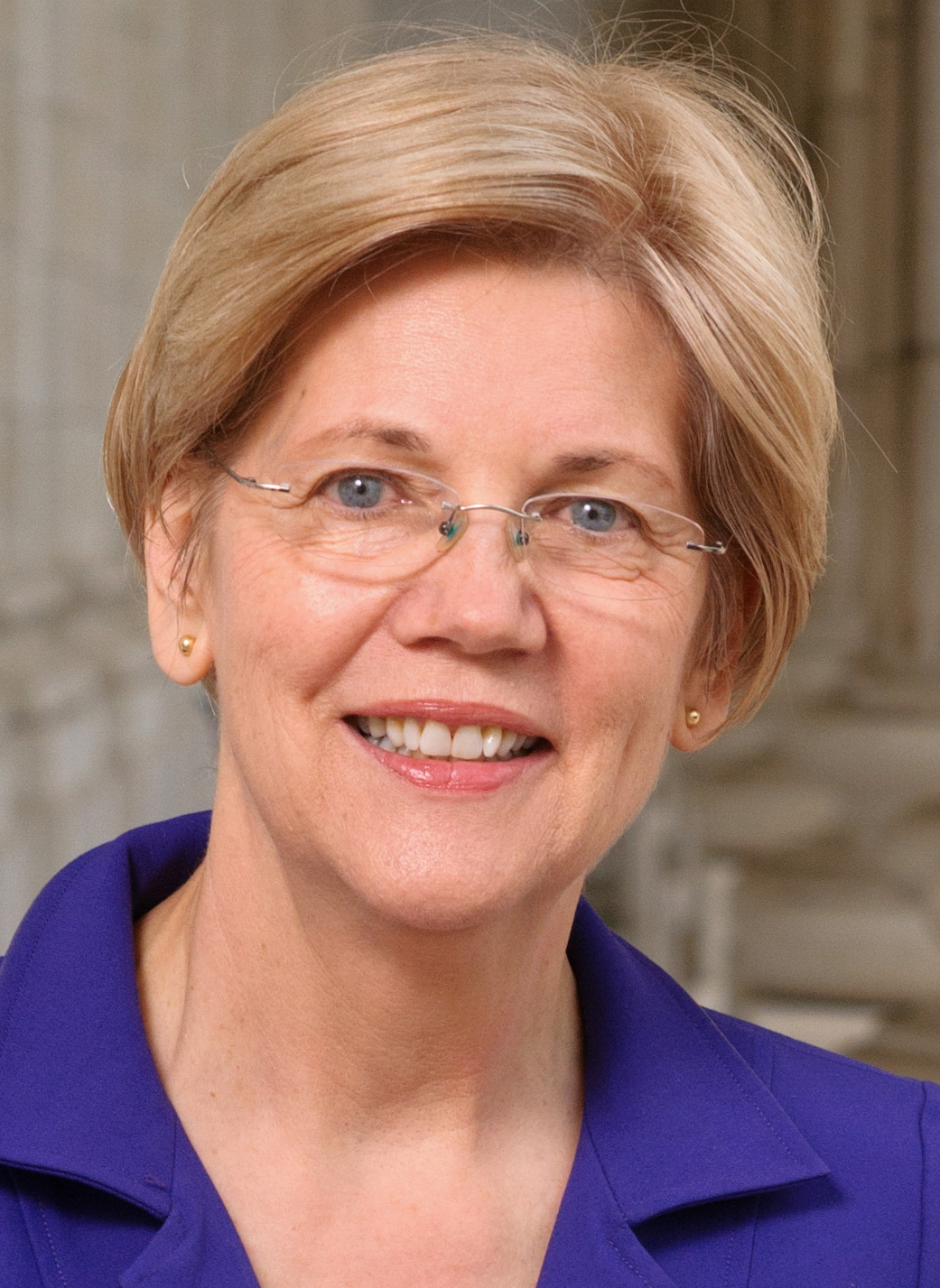
Members (alphabetically left to right)

The Fight Club is composed of seven Democratic senators and one independent.

- Martin Heinrich, (D-NM) (2013–present)
- Ed Markey, (D-MA) (2013–present)
- Jeff Merkley, (D-OR) (2009–present)
- Chris Murphy, (D-CT) (2013–present)
- Bernie Sanders, (I-VT) (2007–present)
- Tina Smith, (D-MN) (2018–present)
- Chris Van Hollen, (D-MD) (2017–present)
- Elizabeth Warren, (D-MA) (2013–present)

== See also ==
- Squad (U.S. Congress)
