= United States Senate Energy Subcommittee on Energy =

US Senate subcommittee of the Committee on Energy and Natural Resources

The United States Senate Energy and Natural Resources Subcommittee on Energy is one of four subcommittees of the U.S. Senate Energy and Natural Resources Committee.

== Jurisdiction ==
This subcommittee's jurisdiction includes oversight and legislative responsibilities for:

- nuclear, coal and synthetic fuels research and development;
- nuclear and non-nuclear energy commercialization projects;
- nuclear fuel cycle policy;
- Department of Energy National Laboratories;
- global climate change;
- new technologies research and development;
- nuclear facilities siting and insurance program;
- commercialization of new technologies including, solar energy systems;
- Federal energy conservation programs;
- energy information;
- liquefied natural gas projects;
- oil and natural gas regulation;
- refinery policy;
- coal conversion;
- utility policy;
- Strategic Petroleum Reserves;
- regulation of Trans-Alaska Pipeline System and other oil and gas pipeline transportation systems within Alaska Arctic research and energy development;
- oil, gas and coal production and distribution.

== Members, 119th Congress ==
Majority	Minority
Dave McCormick, Pennsylvania, Chair; John Barrasso, Wyoming; Jim Risch, Idaho; Tom Cotton, Arkansas; Jim Justice, West Virginia; Bill Cassidy, Louisiana; Cindy Hyde-Smith, Mississippi; John Hoeven, North Dakota	Ruben Gallego, Arizona, Ranking Member; Ron Wyden, Oregon; Mazie Hirono, Hawaii; Angus King, Maine; Catherine Cortez Masto, Nevada; John Hickenlooper, Colorado
Ex officio
Mike Lee, Utah	Martin Heinrich, New Mexico

== Historical subcommittee rosters ==
=== 118th Congress ===
Majority	Minority
Bernie Sanders, Vermont, Chair; Ron Wyden, Oregon; Martin Heinrich, New Mexico; Mazie Hirono, Hawaii; Angus King, Maine; Catherine Cortez Masto, Nevada; John Hickenlooper, Colorado	Josh Hawley, Missouri, Ranking Member; Jim Risch, Idaho; Lisa Murkowski, Alaska; John Hoeven, North Dakota; Bill Cassidy, Louisiana; Cindy Hyde-Smith, Mississippi
Ex officio
Joe Manchin, West Virginia	John Barrasso, Wyoming

== See also ==
- U.S. House Natural Resources Subcommittee on Energy and Mineral Resources
