= Heather Wilson =

American academic administrator (born 1960)

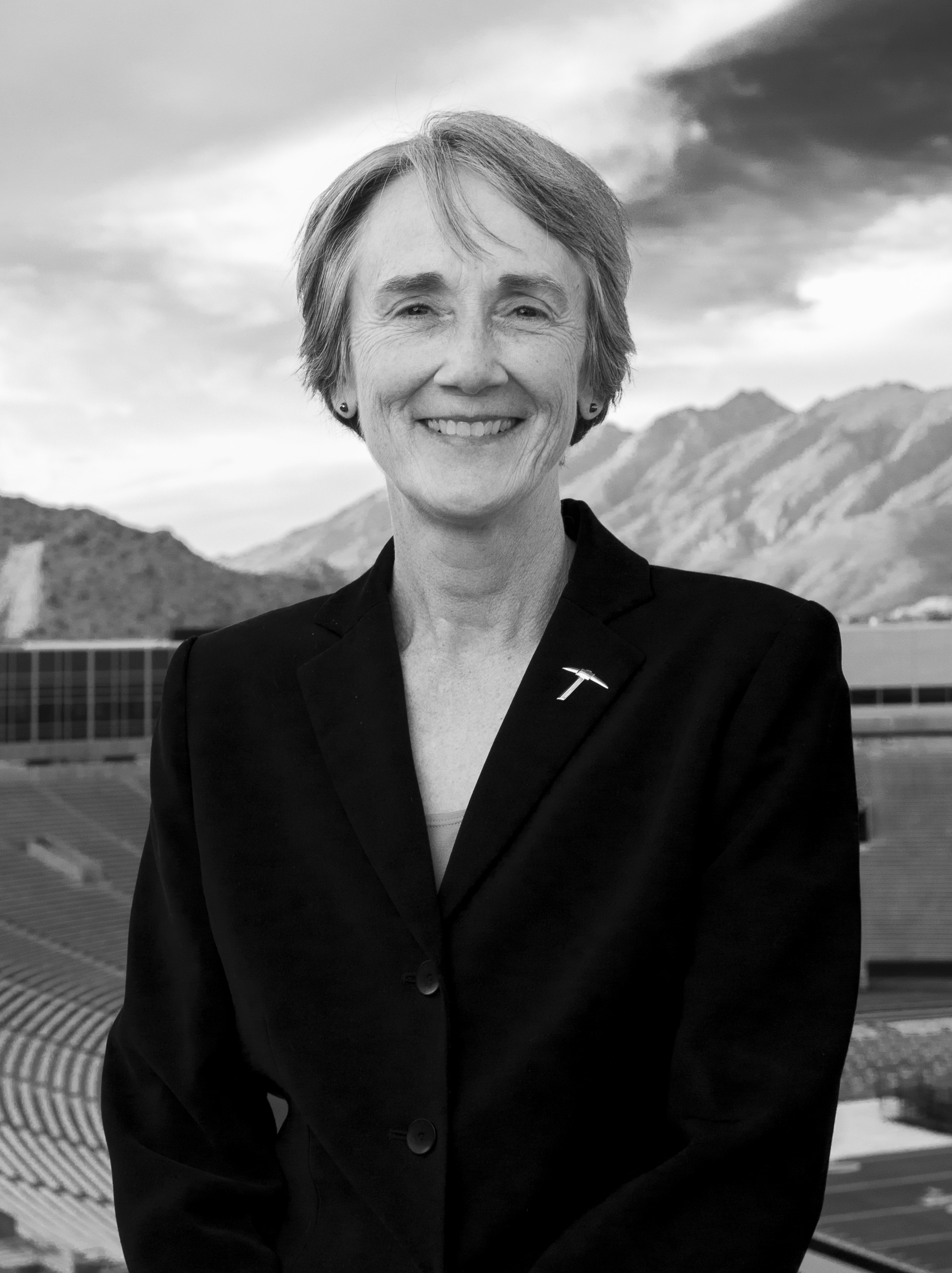
- Wilson in 2021

11th President of University of Texas, El Paso
- Incumbent
- Assumed office August 15, 2019
- Preceded by: Diana Natalicio

24th United States Secretary of the Air Force
- In office May 16, 2017 – May 31, 2019
- President: Donald Trump
- Preceded by: Deborah Lee James
- Succeeded by: Barbara Barrett

12th President of the South Dakota School of Mines and Technology
- In office June 17, 2013 – May 10, 2017
- Preceded by: Robert Wharton
- Succeeded by: Jan Puszynski (acting)

Member of the U.S. House of Representatives from New Mexico's 1st district
- In office June 23, 1998 – January 3, 2009 (Note: Wilson's official service begins on the date of the special election, while she was not sworn in until June 25, 1998.)
- Preceded by: Steven Schiff
- Succeeded by: Martin Heinrich

Personal details
- Born: Heather Ann Wilson; December 30, 1960 (age 65) Keene, New Hampshire, U.S.
- Party: Republican
- Spouse: Jay Hone
- Children: 3
- Education: United States Air Force Academy (BS); Jesus College, Oxford (MPhil, DPhil)
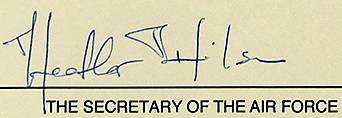
- Signature

Military service
- Allegiance: United States
- Branch/service: United States Air Force
- Years of service: 1978–1989
- Rank: Captain

Heather Ann Wilson (born December 30, 1960) is the 11th president of the University of Texas at El Paso. She previously served as the 24th secretary of the United States Air Force from 2017 through 2019, as the 12th president of the South Dakota School of Mines and Technology from 2013 to 2017, and as a Republican member of the U.S. House of Representatives for New Mexico's 1st congressional district from 1998 to 2009. Wilson was the first female military veteran elected to a full term in Congress.

While in the U.S. House of Representatives, Wilson served on the Permanent Select Committee on Intelligence, the Committee on Armed Services, and the Committee on Energy and Commerce. She did not run for re-election in 2008, instead seeking the U.S. Senate seat of retiring senator Pete Domenici; she finished second in the Republican primary to Congressman Steve Pearce. On March 7, 2011, she announced another run for Senate in 2012 to replace retiring senator Jeff Bingaman, but lost the general election to Democrat Martin Heinrich, her successor in the House of Representatives.

In April 2013 she was selected was president of the South Dakota School of Mines and Technology, making her the first female president of the school. President Donald Trump announced on January 23, 2017, that he would nominate Wilson as Secretary of the Air Force. The U.S. Senate confirmed her nomination on May 8, 2017. On March 8, 2019, Wilson announced that she would resign as Secretary, effective May 31, in order to assume the office of President of the University of Texas at El Paso. On March 2, 2020, Trump appointed Wilson to the National Science Board.

== Early life and education ==
Wilson was born on December 30, 1960, in Keene, New Hampshire, the daughter of Martha Lou, nurse, and George Douglas Wilson, a commercial pilot and member of the Experimental Aircraft Association. Wilson grew up around aviation and hoped to become a pilot like her father and grandfather before her. Her paternal grandparents were born in Scotland. Her grandfather, George Gordon "Scotty" Wilson, flew for the Royal Air Force in World War I and emigrated to America in 1922 where he was a barnstormer and airport operator in the 1920s and 1930s. He served as a courier pilot during World War II and started the New Hampshire Civil Air Patrol where he was a Wing Commander. Her father started flying at age 13 and enlisted in the United States Air Force after high school.

The United States Air Force Academy began admitting women during Wilson's junior year at Keene High School (Keene, New Hampshire). She applied and was appointed to the Academy. At the Academy, she was the first woman to command basic training and the first woman Vice Wing Commander. At the Academy, she flew gliders and single engine aircraft and qualified for the military parachutist badge. She graduated in 1982 as a Distinguished Graduate (magna cum laude equivalent). Wilson earned a Rhodes Scholarship to study at the University of Oxford and continued her education at Jesus College, earning an M.Phil. and D.Phil. in international relations by 1985.

In 1990, Oxford University Press published her book, International Law and the Use of Force by National Liberation Movements, which won the 1988 Paul Reuter Prize for an exceptional contribution to the study of international law by the International Committee of the Red Cross. The Paul Reuter Prize is awarded for a major work in the sphere of international humanitarian law. Wilson won the second Reuter prize ever awarded.

An Air Force officer for seven years, Wilson was a negotiator and political adviser to the U.S. Air Force in the United Kingdom, and a defense planning officer for NATO in Belgium, where her work included arms control negotiations.

== Career ==
=== National Security Council ===
Wilson served in the United States Air Force until 1989 when she was chosen to serve as director for European Defense Policy and Arms Control on the National Security Council staff. She worked for Republican president George H. W. Bush. Her principal responsibilities included guiding the U.S. position on the Conventional Forces in Europe (CFE) negotiations and NATO affairs during the period of the fall of the Berlin Wall and the collapse of the Warsaw Pact.

=== Keystone International ===
After leaving government in 1991, Wilson founded Keystone International, Inc. in Albuquerque, New Mexico to promote business development in the United States and Russia.

=== Governor Johnson administration ===
In 1995, Governor Gary Johnson appointed Wilson to be Cabinet Secretary of the New Mexico Children, Youth, and Families Department. During her tenure, Wilson made efforts to reform child welfare laws, modernize the juvenile justice system, and improve early childhood education. The department opened a juvenile work camp and a secure facility for young, non-violent offenders, as well as streamlining the foster care system. She also was an architect and the chief lobbyist for the governor's education agenda, including a law allowing charter schools, annual testing, and more budget authority for local school boards.

== U.S. House of Representatives ==
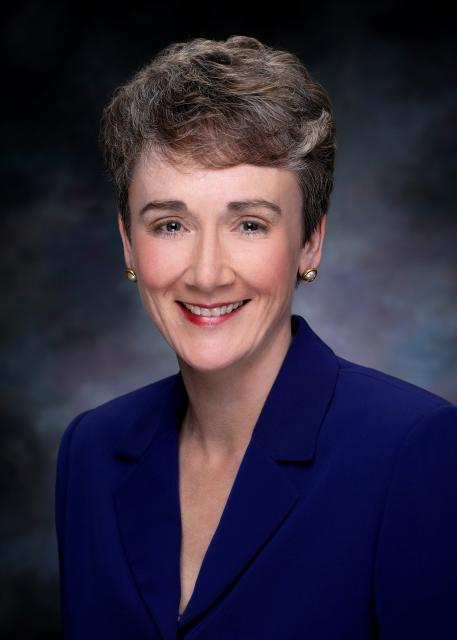
Congressional Photo of Heather Wilson (1998–2009)

=== Elections ===
1998 special election

Five-term Republican Congressman Steven Schiff declared he would not run for re-election in February 1998 because of his battle with squamous cell carcinoma. Wilson resigned her cabinet post to enter the Republican primary. She won the support of Schiff and U.S. Senator Pete Domenici. Domenici called Wilson "the most brilliantly qualified House candidate anywhere in the country." After Congressman Schiff's death in March, a special election on June 23 was announced. Wilson won the Republican primary for the general election with 62 percent of the vote.

Three weeks after winning the primary, Wilson won the special election with 44 percent of the vote in a four-way race against Democratic state senator Phillip Maloof, Green Party candidate Robert L. Anderson, and Libertarian Party candidation Bruce Bush. She was sworn into office on June 25, 1998, making her the first woman since Georgia Lusk in 1946, and the first Republican woman ever, to represent New Mexico.

The special election set a record for the infusion of party money. For the June 23 special election, Maloof spent $3.1 million, approximately $1.5 million of which came from the Maloof family fortune and $1 million from committees. Wilson received $1 million from various GOP committees and raised an additional $1.5 million herself.

In the special election, Wilson was accused of removing her husband's legal guardianship records from the agency's central files. After completing an investigation, former district attorney Bob Schwartz determined, and the Department lawyer confirmed that the files remained intact and available for all official purposes during her time in office.

1998 general election

Less than five months later in the general election, Wilson faced Phil Maloof again. This time, she won a full term, defeating Maloof 48 percent to 41 percent. Maloof far outspent Wilson again, spending an additional $5 million to Wilson's $1.1 million, making it, at that time, the most expensive House race in New Mexico's history.

2000

Wilson defeated her Democratic opponent, former U.S. Attorney John J. Kelly, by five points.

2002

Wilson defeated State Senate President Pro Tem Richard M. Romero by 10 points.

2004

In 2004, Wilson faced Romero again. Outside spending on the election was the 15th highest of all House races that year, totaling $2,499,980. The National Republican Congressional Committee spent $1,085,956 in the race. The Democratic Congressional Campaign Committee spent $1,296,402.

Wilson and 66 other candidates received $10,000 donations from then-U.S. House Majority Leader Tom DeLay's Americans for a Republican Majority (ARMPAC) political action committee. ARMPAC filed termination papers with the Federal Election Commission on April 24, 2007. Wilson returned the $10,000 donation from ARMPAC.

During Wilson's reelection campaign in 2004, Romero ran advertisements criticizing Wilson's vote in Congress against a bill to require the screening of cargo holds, suggesting that they had aided Osama bin Laden. Wilson's campaign countered with a policy ad stating Romero "voted against the death penalty for child molesters who murder their victims."

Wilson won the election by eight points.

2006

In the 2006 elections, Heather Wilson faced New Mexico Attorney General Patricia A. Madrid, and a poll taken from October 24–29 prior to the election by Reuters/Zogby showed Madrid leading Wilson 53–44. Wilson won the election by 875 (out of 211,000) votes, or 0.4%

=== Tenure ===
Wilson was the first woman to represent New Mexico since Georgia Lusk in the 1940s. She served as a member of the Republican Main Street Partnership, a coalition of centrist Republican leaders. Wilson has appeared on HBO's Real Time with Bill Maher.

On October 10, 2002, together with 213 other Republicans and 81 Democrats, Wilson voted in favor of authorizing the use of military force against Iraq.

The Albuquerque Journal reported several instances in 2004 when Wilson acted in opposition to Republican interests: requiring the Bush administration to release cost figures for his prescription drug plan, criticizing Secretary of Defense Donald Rumsfeld about the failure to properly respond to violations of the Geneva Conventions during an Abu Ghraib hearing, and opposing a move by House Republicans to protect Tom DeLay from his fundraising scandal. While critics said these were calculated moves to moderate her image for her upcoming election, Wilson later lost her seat on the House Armed Services Committee due to the actions of Republican Joe Barton, an ally of DeLay.

Medicare Prescription Drug, Improvement, and Modernization Act of 2003 Motion to Recommit

In 2003, Wilson joined 221 Republicans and 1 Democrat in voting against a Motion to Recommit the Medicare Prescription Drug, Improvement, and Modernization Act of 2003 (HR 1). The motion would have deleted entire sections of the joint House and Senate compromise bill and replaced them with the respective Senate version.

Broadcast Decency Enforcement Act

On January 21, 2004, legislation was introduced by Congressman Fred Upton to increase the fines and penalties for violating the prohibitions against the broadcast of obscene, indecent, or profane language. On February 11, 2004, the United States House Energy Subcommittee on Telecommunications and the Internet held a hearing on the bill, at which representatives of the Federal Communications Commission, major broadcasting corporations, and the National Football League testified. During the hearing, Wilson denounced executive Mel Karmazin saying, "You knew what you were doing. You knew what kind of entertainment you're selling, and you wanted us all to be abuzz, here in this room and on the playground in my kids' school, because it improves your ratings. It improves your market share, and it lines your pockets." The bill, H.R. 3717, passed the House of Representatives on March 26, 2004, by a vote of 391–22–1.

NSA warrantless domestic surveillance

On February 7, 2006, Wilson, while serving as Chairwoman of the House Intelligence Subcommittee on Technical and Tactical Intelligence, called for a full congressional inquiry into the NSA warrantless surveillance. Eric Lichtblau of The New York Times said that "the congresswoman's discomfort with the operation appears to reflect deepening fissures among Republicans over the program's legal basis and political liabilities." In an interview for the article, Wilson said, "The president has his duty to do, but I have mine too, and I feel strongly about that."

Terminated U.S. attorney

Wilson was accused of and later cleared of influencing the termination of a U.S. Attorney. In February 2007, former U.S. Attorney David Iglesias alleged that Wilson's competitive 2006 campaign for re-election to the House was a significant reason for his dismissal from the Justice Department. In a March 2007 statement, Wilson said an October call to Iglesias was to resolve an allegation of ethical impropriety made against Iglesias, which Iglesias denied. Iglesias never reported the contact, as he was required to do by DOJ rules. In July 2007, the United States House Committee on Ethics decided not to proceed with any investigation of Wilson. The Justice Department also did a review and the matter was thereafter closed.

Environmental record

Wilson was a member of the Republican Main Street Partnership, the chairs of which introduced legislation to make the United States Environmental Protection Agency (EPA) a cabinet department.

Wilson, along with 80 Democrats and 215 other Republicans, supported House passage of the conference report on the Healthy Forests Restoration Act, which opponents argued would "reduce and expedite environmental and judicial reviews of forest thinning projects.

Wilson, 36 Democrats, and 192 other Republicans supported House passage of the Threatened and Endangered Species Recovery Act of 2005, which would have amended and reauthorized the Endangered Species Act of 1973 to provide greater results conserving and recovering listed species, and for other purposes.

The League of Conservation Voters (LCV) Action Fund, the political advocacy group's Political Action Committee (PAC), named Wilson to its 2006 "Dirty Dozen" list of members of Congress targeted for defeat by the LCV in the 2006 elections. The LCVAF also issued a press release in which Wilson was criticized for voting against a $58 million fund for voluntary conservation measures in the state.

=== Committee assignments ===
- United States House Committee on Energy and Commerce, 105th Congress (1997–1998) until her retirement after the 110th Congress (2007–2008).
  - Subcommittee on Energy and Air Quality
  - Subcommittee on Environment and Hazardous Materials
  - Subcommittee on Health
  - Subcommittee on Telecommunications and the Internet
- United States House Permanent Select Committee on Intelligence, 106th Congress (1999–2000), 109th Congress (2005–2006), and 110th Congress (2007–2008)
  - Subcommittee on Technical and Tactical Intelligence (Chair & Ranking Member)
  - Subcommittee on Oversight and Investigations
- United States House Committee on Armed Services, 107th Congress (2001–2002) and 108th Congress (2003–2004)

== 2008 U.S. Senate campaign ==
Wilson was defeated in a June 3, 2008, primary against Congressman Steve Pearce by a margin of 51% to 49%, and would later endorse Pearce's candidacy. In the general election, Pearce was overwhelmingly defeated by Congressman Tom Udall, 61% to 39%.

== 2012 U.S. Senate campaign ==
On February 18, 2011, incumbent Democratic U.S. Senator Jeff Bingaman decided to retire instead of running for reelection to a sixth term. Wilson won the Republican nomination to succeed him, and faced Democrat Martin Heinrich, who had succeeded Wilson in Congress. In the general election, Heinrich defeated Wilson 51% to 45%.

== Academic career ==
Wilson served as president of the South Dakota School of Mines and Technology from 2013 to 2017, leaving to accept the appointment of Secretary of the Air Force. She returned to academia as the president of the University of Texas at El Paso following her resignation as Secretary of the Air Force.

== Secretary of the Air Force ==
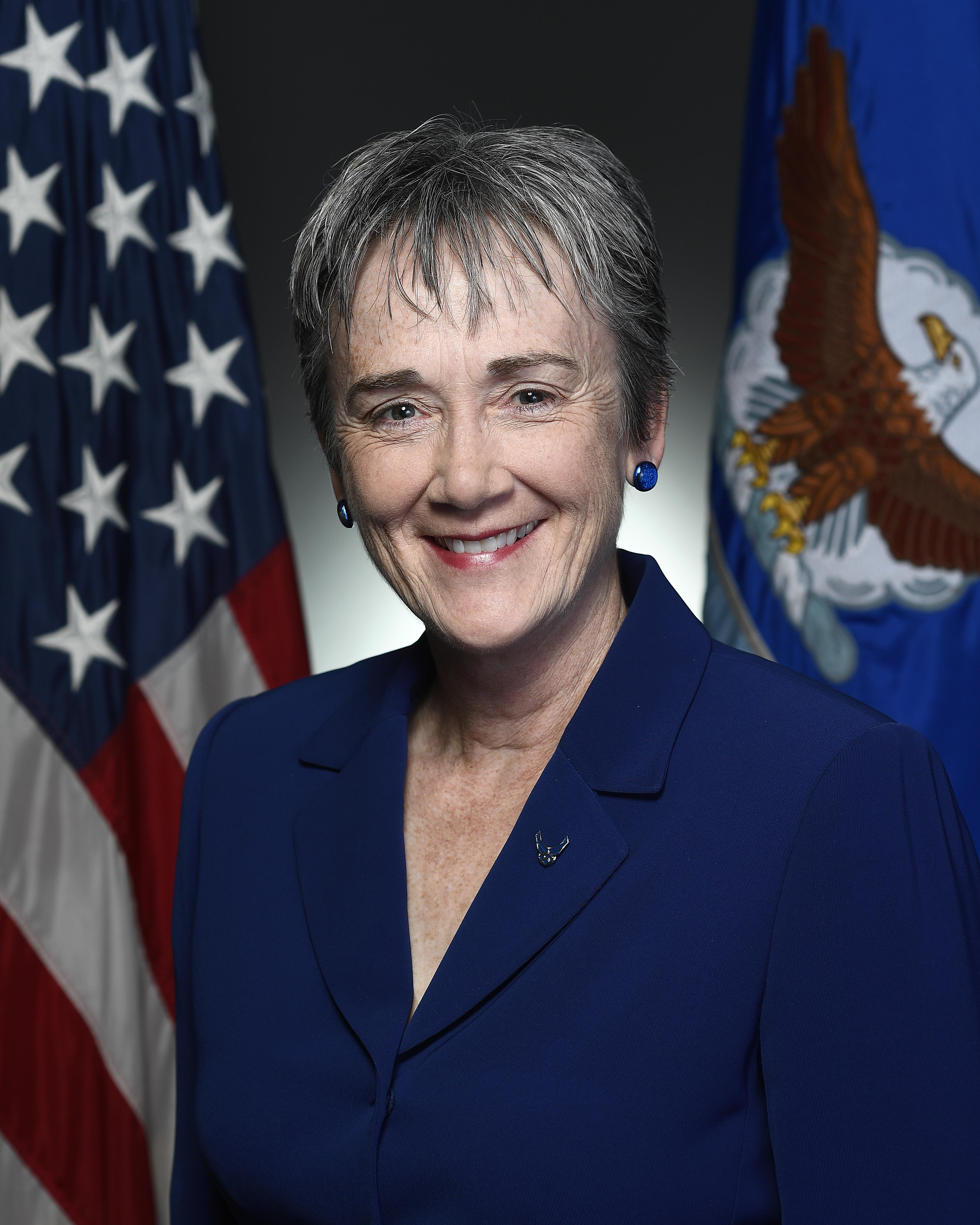
Wilson's official portrait as Secretary of the Air Force, 2017

After being nominated by President Donald Trump on January 23, 2017, and confirmed by the U.S. Senate on May 8, 2017, Wilson became the first U.S. Air Force Academy graduate to be sworn in as Secretary of the Air Force on May 16, 2017.

As the 24th Secretary of the Air Force, Wilson was responsible for the matters of the Air Force Department, including organizing, training, equipping and supplying 685,000 active, guard, reserve and civilian personnel and their families.

On March 8, 2019, Wilson announced she would resign from this position to be President of the University of Texas at El Paso.

== Business career ==
Wilson was the head of the consulting firm, Heather Wilson & Company after leaving Congress.

During her Senate campaign, the Department of Energy began a review of her contracts with national laboratories. In June 2013, a Department of Energy Inspector General report claimed that Wilson collected $450,000 from four Department of Energy facilities between January 2009 and March 2011. The report criticized the labs for maintaining unsatisfactory documentation on the work performed. The labs disagreed with the report.

Sandia Corp., one of the laboratories managed by Lockheed Martin, reimbursed the federal government for the fees paid to Heather Wilson & Company. In 2015, Lockheed Martin paid a $4.7 million fine to settle allegations that it had illegally used taxpayer funds to hire Wilson and others to lobby Congress for an extension of Sandia’s management contract. Wilson disputes being mentioned in that agreement. Wilson stated that she "was not a lobbyist for Sandia and [she] was not a member of the Contract Strategy Team criticized by the Inspector General's report." However, critics dispute her denial and have called the arrangement a "revolving door" of the "national security elite." Wilson was also called one of the most "corrupt members of Congress" by the nonprofit government watchdog group Citizens for Responsibility and Ethics in Washington.

Heather Wilson chaired the Women in Aviation Advisory Board to the Federal Aviation Administration (FAA) and has served on corporate boards of directors including Maxar Technologies, Raven Industries and Peabody Energy.

In May 2024, Wilson joined the board of directors of Lockheed Martin Corporation, America’s largest defense contractor. She also serves on the boards of Google Public Sector and the Texas Space Commission.

== Personal life ==
Wilson is an instrument rated private pilot. She is married to Jay Hone, an attorney and retired Air National Guard Colonel. They have two adult children two granddaughters and two grandsons. Their adopted son, Scott Alexander Hone, died in 2023.

== See also ==
- Women in the United States House of Representatives

U.S. House of Representatives
Preceded by Steven Schiff	Member of the U.S. House of Representatives from New Mexico's 1st congressional district 1998–2009	Succeeded by Martin Heinrich
Party political offices
Preceded by Allen McCulloch	Republican nominee for U.S. Senator from New Mexico (Class 1); 2012	Succeeded by Mick Rich
Academic offices
Preceded by Robert Wharton	President of the South Dakota School of Mines and Technology; 2013–2017	Succeeded by Jan Puszynski; Acting
Preceded by Diana Natalicio	President of the University of Texas, El Paso; 2019–present	Incumbent
Political offices
Preceded by Deborah Lee James	United States Secretary of the Air Force; 2017–2019	Succeeded by Matthew Donovan; Acting
U.S. order of precedence (ceremonial)
Preceded by John Sullivan as Former U.S. Representative	Order of precedence of the United States as Former U.S. Representative	Succeeded by Matt Salmon as Former U.S. Representative
