= 2012 United States Senate election in New Mexico =

- November 6, 2012
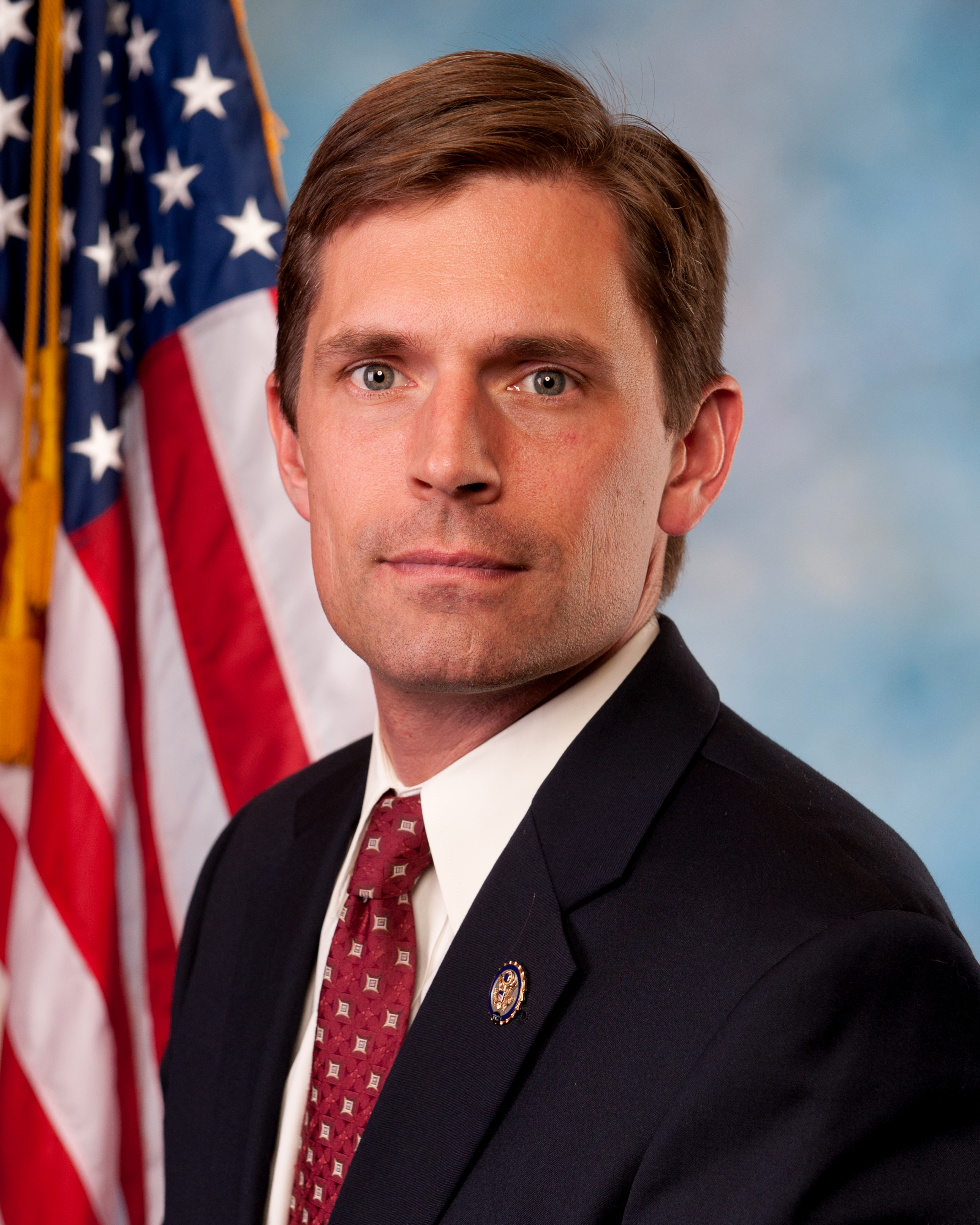

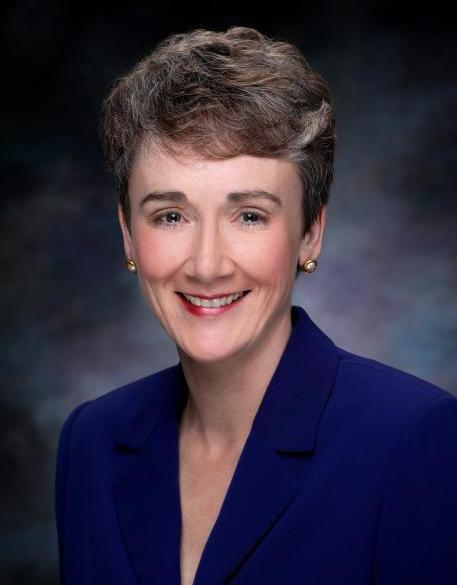
Nominee	Martin Heinrich	Heather Wilson
Party	Democratic	Republican
Popular vote	395,717	351,259
Percentage	51.01%	45.28%
- Heinrich: 40–50% 50–60% 60–70% 70–80% Wilson: 40–50% 50–60% 60–70% 70–80%
U.S. senator before election
Jeff Bingaman
Democratic
Elected U.S. Senator
Martin Heinrich
Democratic

The 2012 United States Senate election in New Mexico took place on November 6, 2012, concurrently with the 2012 U.S. presidential election, other elections to the United States Senate and House of Representatives, and various state and local elections. Incumbent Democratic U.S. Senator Jeff Bingaman decided to retire instead of running for reelection to a sixth term. This was the first open seat since 1928 at this seat. Democratic U.S. Representative Martin Heinrich won the open seat.

== Background ==
Incumbent Jeff Bingaman won re-election to a fifth term with 70.61% of the vote against Allen McCulloch in the 2006 U.S. senatorial election in New Mexico.

== Democratic primary ==
=== Candidates ===
==== Declared ====
- Hector Balderas, state auditor
- Martin Heinrich, U.S. representative

==== Withdrew ====
- Martin Chávez, former Albuquerque mayor and 1998 Democratic gubernatorial nominee (withdrew to run for U.S. House)
- Andres Valdez, anti-police brutality social justice activist

==== Declined ====
- Jeff Bingaman, incumbent U.S. senator
- Diane Denish, former New Mexico lieutenant governor and 2010 Democratic gubernatorial nominee
- Ben Ray Luján, U.S. representative

=== Polling ===
Poll source	Date(s) administered	Sample size	Margin of error	Hector Balderas	Martin Heinrich	Other	Undecided
Public Policy Polling	June 23–26, 2011	400	± 4.9%	24%	47%	—	29%
Magellan Strategies	July 17–18, 2011	636	± 3.9%	21%	54%	—	25%
Public Policy Polling	December 10–12, 2011	309	± 5.6%	30%	47%	—	23%
Public Policy Polling	April 19–22, 2012	270	± 6%	27%	51%	—	22%
Albuquerque Journal/Research & Polling	May 21–24, 2012	741	± 3.6%	26%	51%	—	23%

=== Endorsements ===
Martin Heinrich

Federal officials

- Raúl Grijalva, U.S. representative for Arizona's 7th congressional district

State officials

- Patricia Madrid, former attorney general

New Mexico state senators

- Dede Feldman
- Tim Keller
- Cisco McSorley
- Jerry Ortiz y Pino

New Mexico state representatives

- Eliseo Alcon
- Eleanor Chavez
- Joni Gutierrez
- Bill O'Neill
- Danice Picraux
- Jeff Steinborn
- Mimi Stewart
- J. Paul Taylor

New Mexico mayors

- David Coss, mayor of Santa Fe
- Joe Maestas, former mayor of Española
- Bob Rosebrough, former mayor of Gallup

Unions

- American Federation of State, County and Municipal Employees
- International Association of Machinists
- International Brotherhood of Teamsters
- New Mexico Building and Construction Trades Council
- New Mexico Communication Workers for America
- Service Employees International Union
- United Food and Commercial Workers
- United Steelworkers of America
- United Transportation Union

Organizations

- Council for a Livable World
- Defenders of Wildlife
- League of Conservation Voters
- NARAL Pro-Choice America
- National Committee to Preserve Social Security and Medicare
- Planned Parenthood
- Sierra Club
Hector Balderas

State officials

- Diane Denish, former New Mexico lieutenant governor

New Mexico state senators

- Carlos Cisneros
- Phil Griego
- Richard Martinez
- Cynthia Nava
- Mary Kay Papen
- Bernadette Sanchez
- David Ulibarri

New Mexico state representatives

- Joseph Cervantes
- Mary Helen Garcia
- Miguel Garcia
- Thomas Garcia
- Antonio Lujan
- Jim Trujillo
- Lucky Varela

New Mexico mayors

- Steve Brockett, former mayor of Alamogordo
- Darren Cordova, mayor of Taos
- Danny Cruz, mayor of Springer
- Tony Jaramillo, mayor of Socorro
- Robert Vialpando, mayor of Los Lunas

=== Results ===
Results by county Heinrich: 50–60%; 60–70%; 70–80%; Balderas: 50–60%; 60–70%; 70–80%

Democratic primary results
Party	Candidate	Votes	%
Democratic	Martin Heinrich	83,432	58.9
Democratic	Hector Balderas	58,128	41.1
Total votes		141,560	100

== Republican primary ==
=== Candidates ===
==== Declared ====
- Greg Sowards, businessman
- Heather Wilson, former U.S. representative and candidate for the U.S. Senate in 2008

==== Withdrew ====
- Bill English, businessman
- John Sanchez, lieutenant governor of New Mexico and nominee for governor in 2002

==== Declined ====
- Janice Arnold-Jones, former state representative
- Gary Johnson, former governor (ran for president)
- Steve Pearce, U.S. representative, candidate for the U.S. Senate in 2000, and nominee for the U.S. Senate in 2008

=== Polling ===
Poll source	Date(s) administered	Sample size	Margin of error	Bill English	John Sanchez	Greg Sowards	Heather Wilson	Other	Undecided
Magellan Strategies	April 26–27, 2011	801	± 3.5%	—	17%	2%	59%	11%	11%
Public Policy Polling	June 23–26, 2011	400	± 4.9%	4%	24%	8%	52%	—	12%
Magellan Strategies	July 17–18, 2011	799	± 3.5%	2%	21%	5%	56%	—	16%
Public Policy Polling	December 10–12, 2011	300	± 5.7%	3%	20%	6%	55%	—	16%
Albuquerque Journal	May 21–24, 2012	504	± 4.4%	—	—	20%	66%	—	14%

Hypothetical polling

Poll source	Date(s) administered	Sample size	Margin of error	Bill English	Gary Johnson	John Sanchez	Greg Sowards	Heather Wilson	Other	Undecided
Public Policy Polling	December 10–12, 2011	300	± 5.7%	1%	31%	15%	3%	42%	—	9%

=== Endorsements ===
Heather Wilson

Federal officials

- Pete Domenici, former U.S. senator (R-NM)
- Ari Fleischer, former White House press secretary for George W. Bush
- Manuel Lujan Jr., former U.S. secretary of the interior and former U.S. representative for New Mexico's 1st congressional district
- Bill Redmond, former U.S. representative for New Mexico's 3rd congressional district

State officials

- John Sanchez, lieutenant governor
- Jack Stahl, former lieutenant governor

New Mexico state senators

- Rod Adair
- Vernon Asbill
- Sue Wilson Beffort
- Mark Boitano
- Bill Burt
- Clint Harden
- Stuart Ingle, minority leader
- Gay Kernan
- Carroll Leavell
- Steven Neville
- Bill Payne, minority whip
- Sander Rue
- John Ryan
- Bill Sharer

New Mexico state representatives

- Tom Anderson
- Alonzo Baldonado
- Paul Bandy
- Don Bratton
- David Chavez
- Zachary Cook
- Anna Crook
- Dave Doyle
- Nora Espinoza
- Nate Gentry
- Bill Gray
- Jim Hall
- Jimmie Hall
- Conrad James
- Larry Larranaga
- Tim Lewis
- Dianne Miller Hamilton
- Cathryn Novich-Brown
- Jane Powdrell-Culbert
- Bill Rehm
- Dennis Roch
- Jim Smith
- James Strickler
- Tom Taylor, minority leader
- Don Tripp
- Shirley Tyler
- James White
- Bob Wooley

New Mexico mayors

- Richard J. Berry, mayor of Albuquerque
- Scott Eckstein, mayor of Bloomfield and commissioner of San Juan County
- Louis Huning, former mayor of Los Lunas
- Gary Kanin, former mayor of Corrales
- Bryan Olguin, mayor of Peralta
- Tommy Roberts, mayor of Farmington
- Bill Standley, former mayor of Farmington

=== Results ===
Results by county: Wilson—70–80% Wilson—60–70% Wilson—50–60% Sowards—50–60%

Republican primary results
Party	Candidate	Votes	%
Republican	Heather Wilson	63,631	70.0
Republican	Greg Sowards	27,214	30.0
Total votes		90,845	100

== General election ==
=== Candidates ===
- Jon Barrie (Independent American Party), alternative medicine practitioner and Air Force veteran
- Martin Heinrich (D), U.S. representative
- Heather Wilson (R), former U.S. representative and candidate for the U.S. Senate in 2008

=== Debates ===
- Complete video of debate, October 17, 2012 - C-SPAN
- Complete video of debate, October 25, 2012 - C-SPAN

=== Fundraising ===
Candidate (party)	Receipts	Disbursements	Cash on hand	Debt
Martin Heinrich (D)	$3,883,992	$2,174,712	$1,763,753	$89,424
Heather Wilson (R)	$4,048,847	$2,416,328	$1,632,517	$0
Jon Barrie (I)	$705	$1,150	$0	$445
Source: Federal Election Commission

==== Top contributors ====
Martin Heinrich	Contribution	Heather Wilson	Contribution
League of Conservation Voters	$108,634	Elliott Management Corporation	$29,413
JStreetPAC	$67,860	Mewbourne Oil Co	$25,000
University of New Mexico	$24,221	Kelly PAC	$15,000
Robbins Geller Rudman & Dowd LLP	$23,000	Blue Cross & Blue Shield	$14,050
Council for a Livable World	$20,044	Devon Energy	$13,250
National Rural Letter Carriers' Association	$19,000	Murray Energy	$12,800
Comcast Corporation	$11,250	Yates Petroleum	$12,600
Presbyterian Healthcare Services	$11,150	Livingston Group	$12,249
Intel Corp	$10,500	Publix Super Markets	$11,000
American Optometric Association	$10,250	Westport Construction	$10,500

==== Top industries ====
Martin Heinrich	Contribution	Heather Wilson	Contribution
Lawyers/law firms	$322,120	Retired	$355,880
Retired	$270,598	Oil & gas	$217,500
Lobbyists	$156,480	Leadership PACs	$206,225
Environmental organizations	$145,365	Financial institutions	$163,888
Leadership PACs	$100,000	Lobbyists	$113,549
Health professionals	$95,729	Lawyers/law firms	$106,852
Pro-Israel	$83,860	Real estate	$95,990
Public-sector unions	$67,000	Misc. finance	$72,407
Democratic/Liberal	$64,300	Business services	$72,078
Casinos/gambling	$58,550	Mining	$69,200

=== Predictions ===
Source	Ranking	As of
The Cook Political Report	Lean D	November 1, 2012
Sabato's Crystal Ball	Likely D	November 5, 2012
Rothenberg Political Report	Lean D	November 2, 2012
Real Clear Politics	Likely D	November 5, 2012

=== Polling ===
Poll source	Date(s) administered	Sample size	Margin of error	Martin Heinrich (D)	Heather Wilson (R)	Other	Undecided
Public Policy Polling	February 4–6, 2011	545	± 4.2%	50%	39%	—	11%
Public Policy Polling	June 23–26, 2011	732	± 3.6%	47%	42%	—	11%
Public Policy Polling	December 10–12, 2011	500	± 4.4%	47%	40%	—	13%
Rasmussen Reports	February 14, 2012	500	± 4.5%	45%	43%	5%	7%
Rasmussen Reports	April 3, 2012	500	± 4.5%	46%	42%	7%	6%
Public Policy Polling	April 19–22, 2012	526	± 4.3%	48%	43%	—	9%
Public Policy Polling	July 13–16, 2012	724	± 3.6%	48%	43%	—	9%
Rasmussen Reports	August 21, 2012	500	± 4.5%	48%	41%	5%	7%
Albuquerque Journal	September 3–6, 2012	667	± 3.8%	49%	42%	—	8%
Public Policy Polling	September 7–9, 2012	1,122	± 2.9%	50%	41%	—	9%
We Ask America	September 25–27, 2012	1,258	± 2.85%	52%	41%	—	7%
Public Policy Polling	October 2–3, 2012	778	± n/a%	51%	41%	—	8%
Rasmussen Reports	October 8, 2012	500	± 4.5%	52%	39%	4%	5%
Albuquerque Poll Journal	October 9–11, 2012	658	± 3.8%	48%	39%	4%	9%
Public Policy Polling	October 23–24, 2012	727	± n/a%	52%	44%	—	3%
Albuquerque Poll Journal	October 23–25, 2012	662	± 3.8%	50%	42%	3%	6%

Hypothetical polling

with Jeff Bingaman

Poll source	Date(s) administered	Sample size	Margin of error	Jeff Bingaman (D)	Gary Johnson (R)	Other	Undecided
Public Policy Polling	February 4–6, 2011	545	± 4.2%	51%	40%	—	9%

Poll source	Date(s) administered	Sample size	Margin of error	Jeff Bingaman (D)	Steve Pearce (R)	Other	Undecided
Public Policy Polling	February 4–6, 2011	545	± 4.2%	57%	34%	—	9%

Poll source	Date(s) administered	Sample size	Margin of error	Jeff Bingaman (D)	Heather Wilson (R)	Other	Undecided
Public Policy Polling	February 4–6, 2011	545	± 4.2%	56%	37%	—	9%

with Hector Balderas

Poll source	Date(s) administered	Sample size	Margin of error	Hector Balderas (D)	Gary Johnson (R)	Other	Undecided
Public Policy Polling	December 10–12, 2011	500	± 4.4%	38%	44%	—	19%

Poll source	Date(s) administered	Sample size	Margin of error	Hector Balderas (D)	Greg Sowards (R)	Other	Undecided
Public Policy Polling	June 23–26, 2011	732	± 3.6%	42%	28%	—	30%
Public Policy Polling	December 10–12, 2011	500	± 4.4%	44%	30%	—	27%
Public Policy Polling	April 19–22, 2012	526	± 4.3%	42%	30%	—	28%

Poll source	Date(s) administered	Sample size	Margin of error	Hector Balderas (D)	Heather Wilson (R)	Other	Undecided
Public Policy Polling	June 23–26, 2011	732	± 3.6%	45%	39%	—	16%
Public Policy Polling	December 10–12, 2011	500	± 4.4%	43%	43%	—	14%
Rasmussen Reports	February 14, 2012	500	± 4.5%	44%	44%	3%	9%
Rasmussen Reports	April 3, 2012	500	± 4.5%	42%	43%	5%	9%
Public Policy Polling	April 19–22, 2012	526	± 4.3%	44%	43%	—	12%

with Ben Ray Luján

Poll source	Date(s) administered	Sample size	Margin of error	Ben Ray Luján (D)	Gary Johnson (R)	Other	Undecided
Public Policy Polling	February 4–6, 2011	545	± 4.2%	40%	45%	—	9%

Poll source	Date(s) administered	Sample size	Margin of error	Ben Ray Luján (D)	Steve Pearce (R)	Other	Undecided
Public Policy Polling	February 4–6, 2011	545	± 4.2%	49%	37%	—	14%

Poll source	Date(s) administered	Sample size	Margin of error	Ben Ray Luján (D)	Heather Wilson (R)	Other	Undecided
Public Policy Polling	February 4–6, 2011	545	± 4.2%	48%	40%	—	12%

with Martin Heinrich

Poll source	Date(s) administered	Sample size	Margin of error	Martin Heinrich (D)	Gary Johnson (R)	Other	Undecided
Public Policy Polling	February 4–6, 2011	545	± 4.2%	43%	44%	—	14%
Public Policy Polling	December 10–12, 2011	500	± 4.4%	43%	43%	—	14%

Poll source	Date(s) administered	Sample size	Margin of error	Martin Heinrich (D)	Steve Pearce (R)	Other	Undecided
Public Policy Polling	February 4–6, 2011	545	± 4.2%	53%	38%	—	10%

Poll source	Date(s) administered	Sample size	Margin of error	Martin Heinrich (D)	Greg Sowards (R)	Other	Undecided
Public Policy Polling	June 23–26, 2011	732	± 3.6%	46%	34%	—	20%
Public Policy Polling	December 10–12, 2011	500	± 4.4%	49%	31%	—	20%
Public Policy Polling	April 19–22, 2012	526	± 4.3%	48%	34%	—	18%

=== Results ===
2012 United States Senate election in New Mexico
Party	Candidate	Votes	%	±%
Democratic	Martin Heinrich	395,717	51.01%	−19.60%
Republican	Heather Wilson	351,259	45.28%	+15.95%
Independent American	Jon Barrie	28,199	3.63%	N/A
Independent	Robert L. Anderson (write-in)	617	0.08%	N/A
Total votes		775,792	100.0%	N/A
Democratic hold				

==== By county ====
County	Martin Heinrich Democratic		Heather Wilson Republican		All others		Margin		Total votes cast
County	#	%	#	%	#	%	#	%	Total votes cast
Bernalillo	144,659	53.8%	115,514	42.9%	8,805	3.2%	29,145	10.9%	268,978
Catron	591	28.1%	1,376	65.4%	137	6.5%	-785	-37.3%	2,104
Chaves	6,566	32.6%	12,791	63.5%	786	3.9%	-6,225	-30.9%	20,143
Cibola	4,493	55.1%	3,256	39.9%	408	5.0%	1,237	15.2%	8,157
Colfax	2,737	47.9%	2,732	47.8%	248	4.3%	5	0.1%	5,717
Curry	3,818	28.6%	9,055	67.9%	463	3.5%	-5,237	-39.3%	13,336
De Baca	291	32.6%	584	65.4%	18	2.0%	-293	-32.8%	893
Doña Ana	36,579	56.2%	25,145	38.6%	3,391	5.2%	11,434	17.6%	65,115
Eddy	6,077	32.0%	12,255	64.5%	678	3.5%	-6,178	-32.5%	19,010
Grant	7,049	54.9%	5,255	41.0%	525	4.1%	1,794	13.9%	12,829
Guadalupe	1,396	65.7%	656	30.9%	73	3.4%	740	34.8%	2,125
Harding	249	42.1%	322	54.4%	21	3.5%	-73	-12.3%	592
Hidalgo	892	47.2%	909	48.1%	89	4.7%	-17	-0.9%	1,890
Lea	4,006	23.9%	12,200	72.8%	561	3.3%	-8,194	-48.9%	16,767
Lincoln	2,950	32.2%	5,797	63.2%	424	4.6%	-2,847	-31.0%	91,71
Los Alamos	4,540	43.0%	5,743	54.4%	273	2.6%	-1,203	-11.4%	10,556
Luna	3,494	47.3%	3,471	47.0%	418	5.6%	23	0.3%	7,383
McKinley	13,004	60.5%	7,647	35.6%	853	4.0%	5,357	24.9%	21,504
Mora	1,803	69.9%	705	27.3%	72	2.8%	1,098	42.6%	2,580
Otero	6,638	33.6%	12,084	61.2%	1,039	5.2%	-5,446	-27.6%	19,761
Quay	1,385	38.1%	2,104	57.8%	150	4.1%	-719	-19.7%	3,639
Rio Arriba	10,071	66.3%	4,654	30.6%	466	3.1%	5,417	35.7%	15,191
Roosevelt	1,671	28.5%	3,917	66.8%	273	4.6%	-2,246	-38.3%	5,861
San Juan	14,450	31.6%	29,270	64.0%	2,036	4.4%	-14,820	-32.4%	45,756
San Miguel	8,308	72.8%	2,758	24.2%	342	3.0%	5,550	48.6%	11,408
Sandoval	25,727	47.9%	26,079	48.5%	1,929	3.6%	-352	-0.6%	53,735
Santa Fe	49,291	71.9%	17,456	25.5%	1,828	2.6%	31,835	46.4%	68,575
Sierra	1,984	39.3%	2,790	55.3%	273	5.4%	-806	-16.0%	5,047
Socorro	3,745	52.6%	3,052	42.8%	329	4.6%	693	9.8%	7,126
Taos	11,373	75.0%	3,326	21.9%	457	3.0%	8,047	53.1%	15,156
Torrance	2,318	36.3%	3,782	59.2%	288	4.5%	-1,464	-22.9%	6,388
Union	442	26.0%	1,193	70.2%	65	3.8%	-751	-44.2%	1,700
Valencia	13,120	47.5%	13,381	48.5%	1,098	4.0%	-261	-1.0%	27,599
Total	395,717	51.0%	351,259	45.3%	28,816	3.7%	44,458	5.7%	775,792

Counties that flipped from Democratic to Republican

- Chaves (largest village: Roswell)
- Curry (largest village: Clovis)
- Eddy (largest city: Carlsbad)
- Harding (largest city: Roy)
- Hidalgo (largest city: Lordsburg)
- Lea (largest city: Hobbs)
- Lincoln (largest city: Roidoso)
- Otero (largest city: Alamogordo)
- Quay (largest city: Tucumcari)
- Roosevelt (largest city: Portales)
- Sandoval (largest city: Rancho)
- San Juan (largest city: Farmington)
- Sierra (largest city: Truth or Consequences)
- Torrance (largest city: Moriarty)
- Union (largest city: Clayton)
- Valencia (largest village: Los Lunas)
- De Baca (largest city: Fort Sumner)
- Los Alamos (largest city: Los Alamos)
- Catron (largest city: Reserve)

==== By congressional district ====
Heinrich won two of three congressional districts.

District	Heinrich	Wilson	Representative
1st	53.5%	43.34%	Michelle Lujan Grisham
2nd	44.37%	51.15%	Steve Pearce
3rd	54.15%	42.42%	Ben Ray Luján

== See also ==
- 2012 United States Senate elections
- 2012 United States House of Representatives elections in New Mexico
