= Exhaust gas =

Gases emitted as a result of fuel reactions in combustion engines

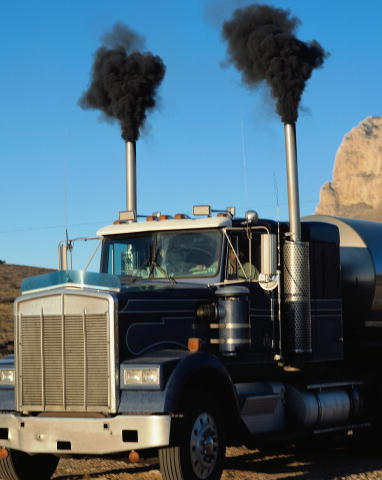
This diesel-powered truck emits an exhaust gas full of black particulate matter when starting up the engine.

Exhaust gas or flue gas is emitted as a result of the combustion of fuels such as natural gas, gasoline (petrol), diesel fuel, fuel oil, biodiesel blends, or coal. According to the type of engine, it is discharged into the atmosphere through an exhaust pipe, flue gas stack, or propelling nozzle. It often disperses downwind in a pattern called an exhaust plume.

It is a major component of motor vehicle emissions (and from stationary internal combustion engines), which can also include crankcase blow-by and evaporation of unused gasoline.

Air pollution from burning fossil fuels is estimated to kill over 5 million people each year. Motor vehicle emissions are a common source of air pollution and are a major ingredient in the creation of smog in some large cities.

== Composition ==
The largest part of most combustion gas is nitrogen (N_{2}), water vapor (H_{2}O) (except with pure-carbon fuels), and carbon dioxide (CO_{2}) (except for fuels without carbon); these are not toxic or noxious (although water vapor and carbon dioxide are greenhouse gases that contribute to climate change). A relatively small part of combustion gas is undesirable, noxious, or toxic substances, such as carbon monoxide (CO) from incomplete combustion, hydrocarbons (properly indicated as C_{x}H_{y}, but typically shown simply as "HC" on emissions-test slips) from unburnt fuel, nitrogen oxides (NO_{x}) from excessive combustion temperatures, and particulate matter (mostly soot) from incomplete combustion.

== Exhaust gas temperature ==
Exhaust gas temperature (EGT) is important to the functioning of the catalytic converter of an internal combustion engine. It may be measured by an exhaust gas temperature gauge. EGT is also a measure of engine health in gas-turbine engines (see below).

== Cold engines ==
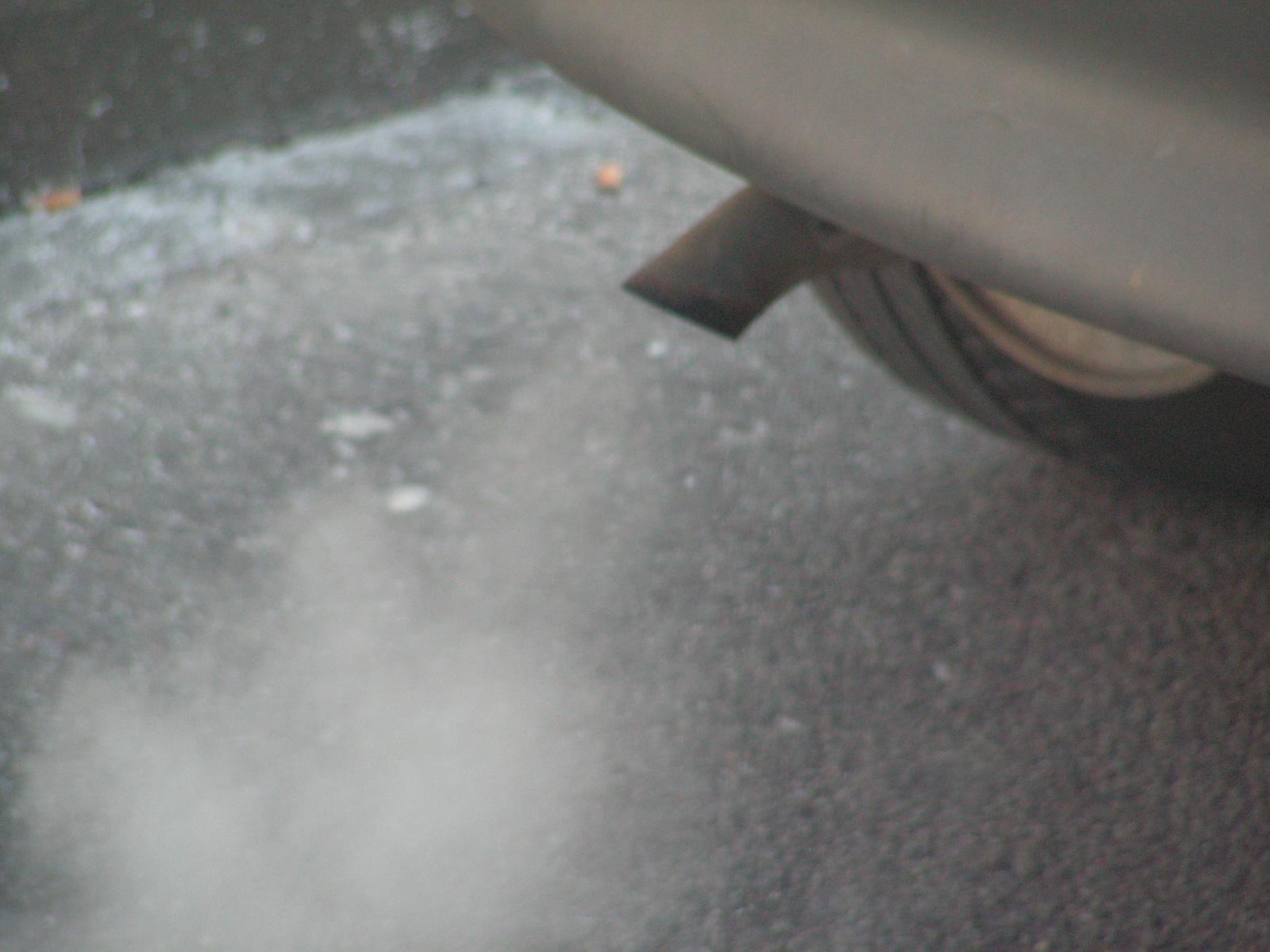
Steam from tailpipe of cold car

During the first two minutes after starting the engine of a car that has not been operated for several hours, the amount of emissions can be very high. This occurs for two main reasons:

- Rich air-fuel ratio requirement in cold engines: When a cold engine is started, the fuel does not vaporize completely, creating higher emissions of hydrocarbons and carbon monoxide, which diminishes only as the engine reaches operating temperature. The duration of this start-up phase has been reduced by advances in materials and technology, including computer-controlled fuel injection, shorter intake lengths, and pre-heating of fuel and/or inducted air.
- Inefficient catalytic converter under cold conditions: Catalytic converters are very inefficient until warmed up to their operating temperature. This time has been much reduced by moving the converter closer to the exhaust manifold and even more so placing a small yet quick-to-heat-up converter directly at the exhaust manifold. The small converter handles the start-up emissions, which allows enough time for the larger main converter to heat up. Further improvements can be realised in many ways, including electric heating, thermal battery, chemical reaction preheating, flame heating and superinsulation.

== Passenger car emissions summary ==
U.S. Environmental Protection Agency estimates of average passenger car emissions in the United States for April 2000
Component	Emission Rate	Annual pollution emitted
Hydrocarbons	2.80 grams/mile (1.75 g/km)	77.1 pounds (35.0 kg)
Carbon monoxide	20.9 grams/mile (13.06 g/km)	575 pounds (261 kg)
NO_{x}	1.39 grams/mile (0.87 g/km)	38.2 pounds (17.3 kg)
Carbon dioxide - greenhouse gas	415 grams/mile (258 g/km)	11,450 pounds (5,190 kg)

Comparable with the European emission standards EURO III as it was applied in October 2000

In 2000, the United States Environmental Protection Agency began to implement more stringent emissions standards for light duty vehicles. The requirements were phased in beginning with 2004 vehicles and all new cars and light trucks were required to meet the updated standards by the end of 2007.

United States Light-Duty Vehicle, Light-Duty Truck, and Medium-Duty Passenger Vehicle—Tier 2 Exhaust Emission Standards (for Bin 5)
Component	Emission Rate	Annual pollution emitted
NMOG (Volatile organic compounds)	0.075 grams/mile (0.046 g/km)	2.1 pounds (0.95 kg)
Carbon Monoxide	3.4 grams/mile (2.1 g/km)	94 pounds (43 kg)
NO_{X}	0.05 grams/mile (0.0305 g/km)	1.4 pounds (0.64 kg)
Formaldehyde	0.015 grams/mile (0.0092 g/km)	0.41 pounds (0.19 kg)

== Types ==
=== Internal-combustion engines ===
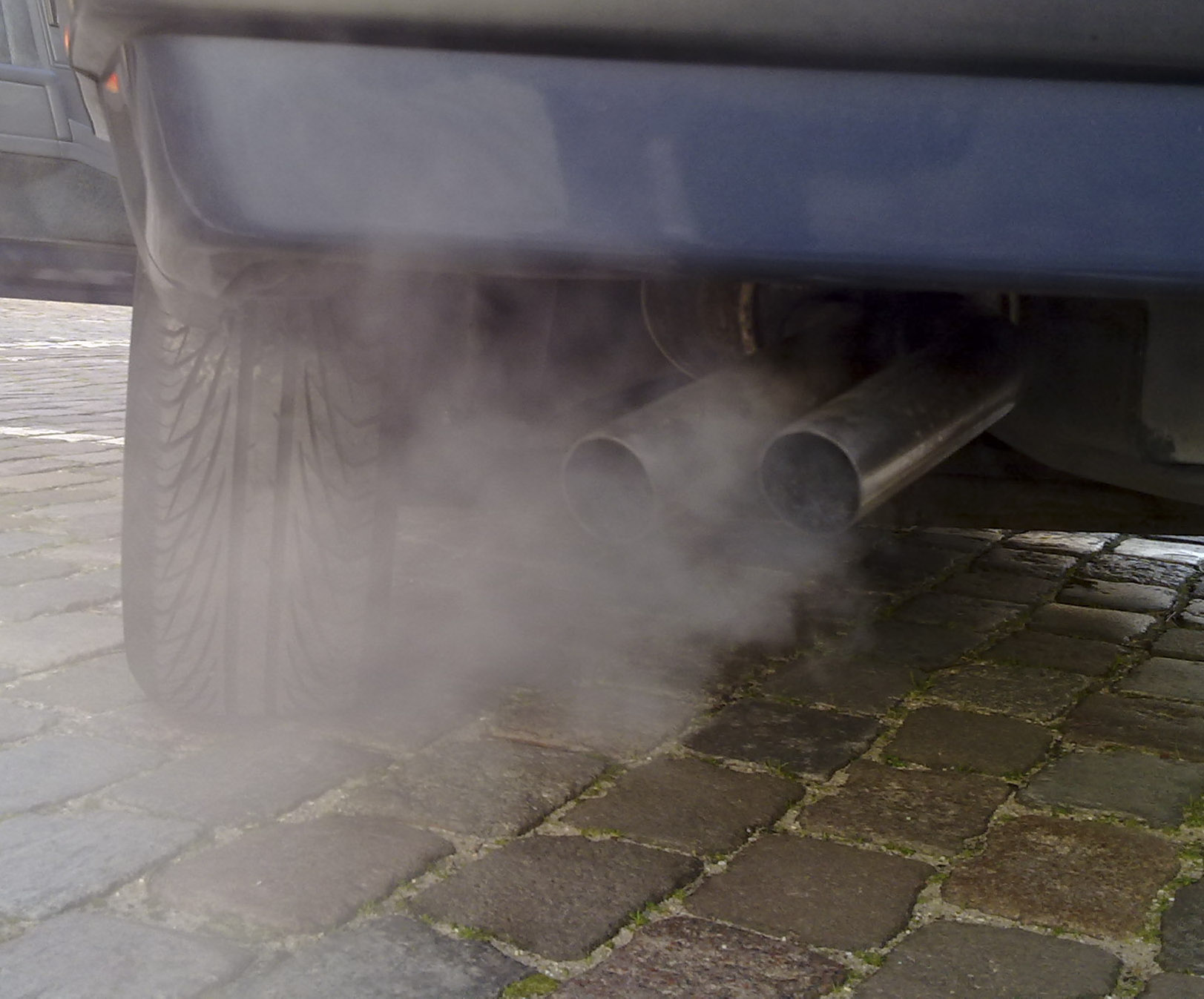
Automobile exhaust

==== Spark-ignition and Diesel engines ====
In spark-ignition engines the gases resulting from combustion of the fuel and air mix are called exhaust gases. The composition varies from petrol to diesel engines, but is around these levels:

Combustion-engine exhaust gases^{All figures are approximate}
Compound	% of total	
Compound	Petrol	Diesel
Nitrogen	71	67
Carbon dioxide	14	12
Water vapor	13	11
Oxygen		10
Trace elements	< 0.6	~ 0.3
Nitrogen oxides	< 0.25	< 0.15
Carbon monoxide	1 - 2	< 0.045
Particulate matter		< 0.045
Hydrocarbons	< 0.25	< 0.03
Sulfur dioxide	Possible traces	< 0.03

The 10% oxygen for "diesel" is likely if the engine was idling, e.g. in a test rig. It is much less if the engine is running under load, although diesel engines always operate with an excess of air over fuel. The CO content for petrol engines varies from ≈15 ppm for well tuned engine with fuel injection and a catalytic converter up to 100,000 ppm (10%) for a richly tuned carburetor engine, such as typically found on small generators and garden equipment.

===== Nitromethane additive =====
Exhaust gas from an internal combustion engine whose fuel includes nitromethane will contain nitric acid vapour, which is corrosive, and when inhaled causes a muscular reaction making it impossible to breathe. People who are likely to be exposed to it should wear a gas mask.

==== Diesel engines ====
Diesel exhaust is the exhaust gas produced by a diesel engine, plus any contained particulates. Its composition may vary with the fuel type, rate of consumption or speed of engine operation (e.g., idling or at speed or under load), and whether the engine is in an on-road vehicle, farm vehicle, locomotive, marine vessel, or stationary generator or other application.

Diesel exhaust causes lung cancer and other diseases such as asthma, and many premature deaths. Methods exist to reduce nitrogen oxides (NO_{x}) and particulate matter (PM) in the exhaust.

Some countries have set a date to stop selling diesel vehicles, and some city centres will ban diesel cars.

==== Gas-turbine engines ====
In aircraft gas turbine engines, "exhaust gas temperature" (EGT) is a primary measure of engine health. Typically the EGT is compared with a primary engine power indication called "engine pressure ratio" (EPR). For example: at full power EPR there will be a maximum permitted EGT limit. Once an engine reaches a stage in its life where it reaches this EGT limit, the engine will require specific maintenance in order to rectify the problem. The amount the EGT is below the EGT limit is called EGT margin. The EGT margin of an engine will be greatest when the engine is new, or has been overhauled. For most airlines, this information is also monitored remotely by the airline maintenance department by means of ACARS.

==== Jet engines and rocket engines ====
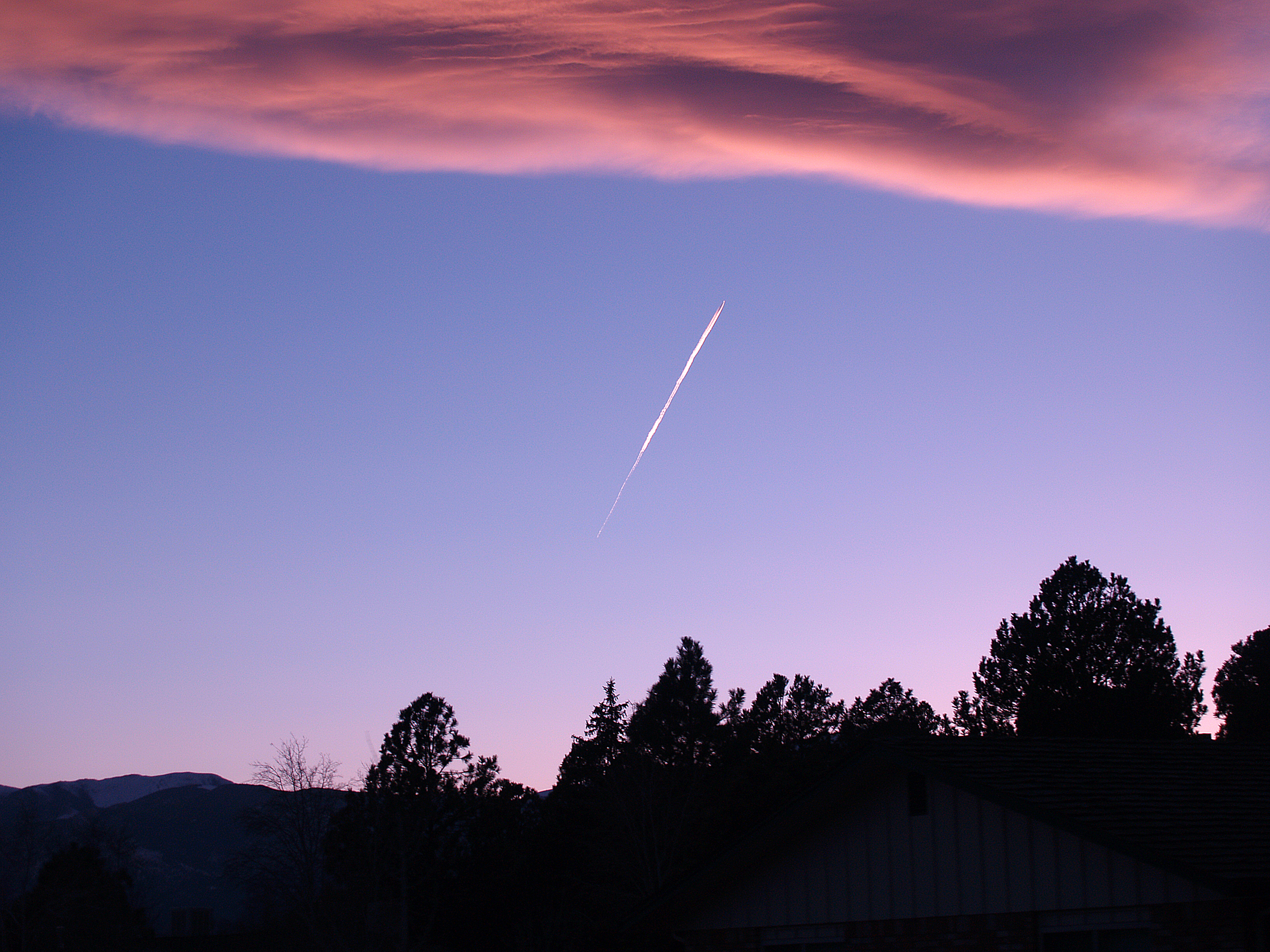
A contrail formed by the presence of water vapour in the exhaust from jet engines.

In jet engines and rocket engines, exhaust from propelling nozzles which in some applications shows shock diamonds.

=== Other types ===
==== From burning coal ====
Flue gas is that emitted from ovens, furnaces and boilers.

==== Steam engines ====
In steam engine terminology the exhaust is steam that is now so low in pressure that it can no longer do useful work.

== Main motor vehicle emissions ==
Road vehicles produce a significant amount of all air pollution. Vehicles with petrol and diesel engines produce about half of their emissions from their exhaust gas, and the other half from non-exhaust emissions (tire and brake wear and erosion or disturbance of the road surface).

=== NO_{x} ===
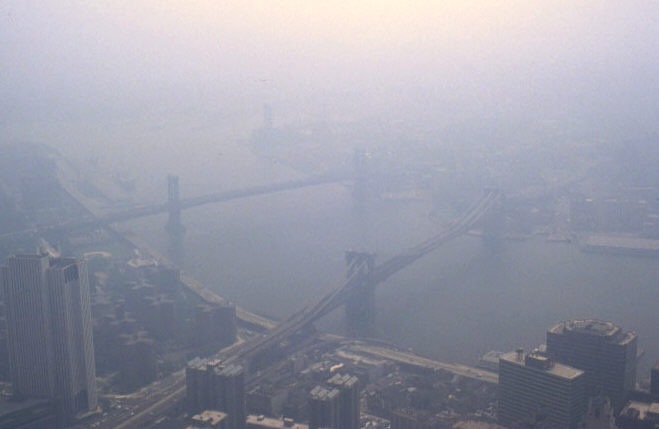
Smog in New York City as viewed from the World Trade Center in 1988

Mono-nitrogen oxides NO and NO_{2} (NOx) (whether produced this way or naturally by lightning) react with ammonia, moisture, and other compounds to form nitric acid vapor and related particles. Small particles can penetrate deeply into sensitive lung tissue and damage it, causing premature death in extreme cases. Inhalation of NO species increases the risk of lung cancer and colorectal cancer. and inhalation of such particles may cause or worsen respiratory diseases such as emphysema and bronchitis and heart disease.

In a 2005 U.S. EPA study the largest emissions of NO_{x} came from on road motor vehicles, with the second largest contributor being non-road equipment which is mostly gasoline and diesel stations.

The resulting nitric acid may be washed into soil, where it becomes nitrate, which is useful to growing plants.

=== Volatile organic compounds ===
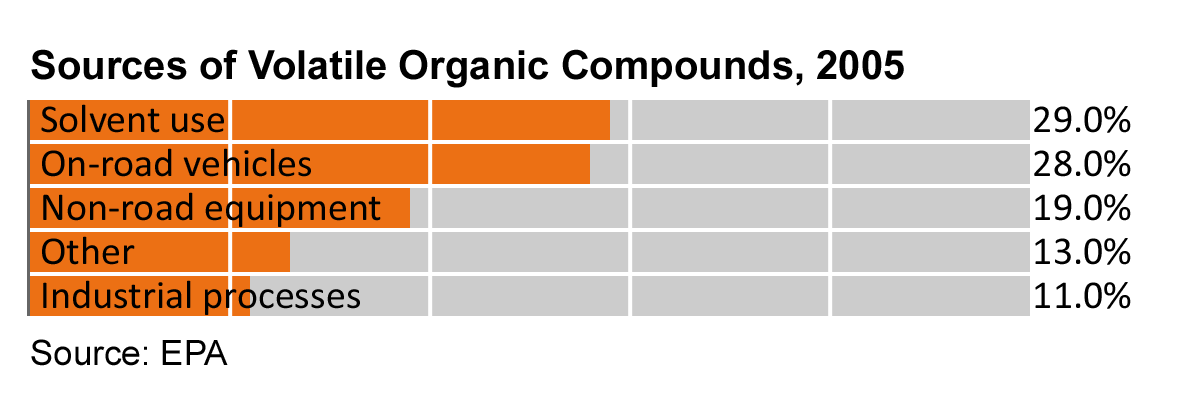
Non-road equipment is mostly gasoline and diesel stations.

When oxides of nitrogen (NOx) and volatile organic compounds (VOCs) react in the presence of sunlight, ground level ozone is formed, a primary ingredient in smog. A 2005 U.S. EPA report gives road vehicles as the second largest source of VOCs in the U.S. at 26% and 19% are from non road equipment which is mostly gasoline and diesel stations. 27% of VOC emissions are from solvents which are used in the manufacturer of paints and paint thinners and other uses.

=== Ozone ===
Ozone is beneficial in the upper atmosphere, but at ground level ozone irritates the respiratory system, causing coughing, choking, and reduced lung capacity. It also has many negative effects throughout the ecosystem.

=== Carbon monoxide (CO) ===
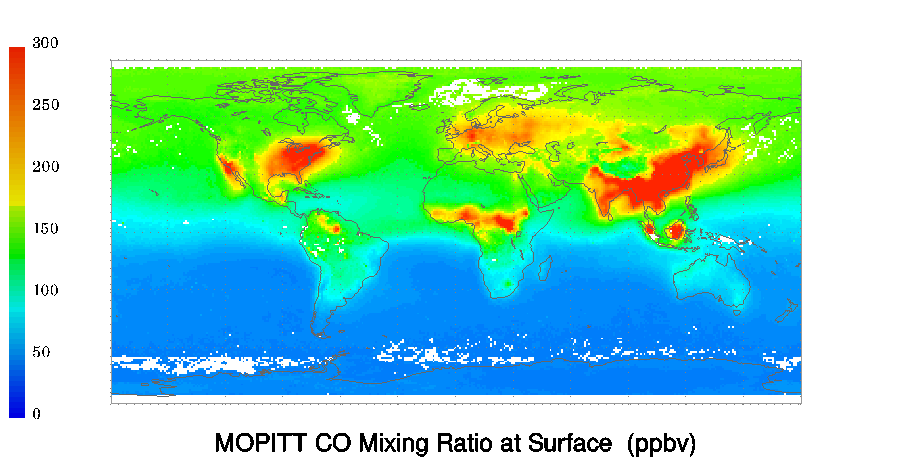
MOPITT satellite computer image of carbon monoxide March 2010

Carbon monoxide poisoning is the most common type of fatal air poisoning in many countries. Carbon monoxide is colorless, odorless and tasteless, but highly toxic. It combines with hemoglobin to produce carboxyhemoglobin, which blocks the transport of oxygen. At concentrations above 1000ppm it is considered immediately dangerous and is the most immediate health hazard from running engines in a poorly ventilated space. In 2011, 52% of carbon monoxide emissions were created by mobile vehicles in the U.S.

=== Hazardous air pollutants (toxics) ===
Chronic (long-term) exposure to benzene (C_{6}H_{6}) damages bone marrow. It can also cause excessive bleeding and depress the immune system, increasing the chance of infection. Benzene causes leukemia and is associated with other blood cancers and pre-cancers of the blood.

=== Particulate matter (PM_{10} and PM_{2.5}) ===
The health effects of inhaling airborne particulate matter have been widely studied in humans and animals and include asthma, lung cancer, cardiovascular issues, premature death. Because of the size of the particles, they can penetrate the deepest part of the lungs. A 2011 UK study estimates 90 deaths per year due to passenger vehicle PM. In a 2006 publication, the U.S. Federal Highway Administration (FHWA) state that in 2002 about 1% of all PM_{10} and 2% of all PM_{2.5} emissions came from the exhaust of on-road motor vehicles (mostly from diesel engines). In Chinese, European, and Indian markets, both diesel and gasoline vehicles are required to have a tailpipe filter installed, while the United States has mandated it for diesel only. In 2022, British testing specialist Emissions Analytics estimated that the 300 million or so gasoline vehicles in the US over the subsequent decade would emit around 1.6 septillion harmful particles.

=== Carbon dioxide (CO_{2}) ===
Carbon dioxide is a greenhouse gas. Motor vehicle CO_{2} emissions are part of the anthropogenic contribution to the growth of CO_{2} concentrations in the atmosphere which according to the vast majority of the scientific community is causing climate change. Motor vehicles are calculated to generate about 20% of the European Union's man-made CO_{2} emissions, with passenger cars contributing about 12%. European emission standards limit the CO_{2} emissions of new passenger cars and light vehicles. The European Union average new car CO_{2} emissions figure dropped by 5.4% in the year to the first quarter of 2010, down to 145.6 g/km.

=== Water vapour ===
Vehicle exhaust contains much water vapour.

==== Water recovery ====
There has been research into ways that troops in deserts can recover drinkable water from their vehicles' exhaust gases.

== Pollution reduction ==
Emission standards focus on reducing pollutants contained in the exhaust gases from vehicles as well as from industrial flue gas stacks and other air pollution exhaust sources in various large-scale industrial facilities such as petroleum refineries, natural gas processing plants, petrochemical plants and chemical production plants. However, these are often referred to as flue gases. Catalytic converters in cars intend to break down the pollution of exhaust gases using a catalyst. Scrubbers in ships intend to remove the sulfur dioxide (SO_{2}) of marine exhaust gases. The regulations on marine sulfur dioxide emissions are tightening, however only a small number of special areas worldwide have been designated for low sulfur diesel fuel use only.

== Disease and early deaths ==
Air pollution from fossil fuel use by industry, power generation, and transportation is estimated to kill over 5 million people each year. A 2013 study by the Massachusetts Institute of Technology (MIT) indicates that 53,000 early deaths occur per year in the United States alone because of vehicle emissions. According to another study from the same university, traffic fumes alone cause the death of 5,000 people every year just in the United Kingdom. A 2024 study published in the journal Environmental Research Letters suggested that 41,800 premature deaths in the US could be attributed to air pollution caused by roads and fossil fuel-powered transit.

Researchers from the University of California, Los Angeles School of Public Health say preliminary results of their statistical study of children listed in the California Cancer Registry born between 1998 and 2007 found that traffic pollution may be associated with a 5% to 15% increase in the likelihood of some cancers. A World Health Organization study found that diesel fumes cause an increase in lung cancer.

The California Air Resources Board found in studies that 50% or more of the air pollution (smog) in Southern California is due to car emissions. Concentrations of pollutants emitted from combustion engines may be particularly high around signalized intersections because of idling and accelerations. Computer models often miss this kind of detail.

== See also ==
- Alternative propulsion
- Atmospheric dispersion modeling
- Automobile#Environmental impact
- Clean Air Act
- Congestion pricing
- Emission standard
- Environmental effects of transport
- European emission standards
- Exhaust gas analyzer
- Flue gas
- Kyoto Protocol
- Landfill gas
- List of most-polluted cities by particulate matter concentration
- Low-emission zone
- Mobile source air pollution
- Motor vehicle emissions and pregnancy
- Rolling coal
- Space jellyfish
- United States emission standards
- Vehicle emissions control
