= Twilight phenomenon =

Weather phenomenon associated with rocketry

External videos
- Time-lapse of rocket exhaust above the Sea of Japan in the evening of December 9, 2022.

Twilight phenomenon (seen from the Louisiana-24 Long Range Tracking Telescope site in northern Santa Barbara county) lights up the night sky over Vandenberg Air Force Base following the launch of a Minuteman III missile September 19, 2002 (Official USAF Photo by Dennis Fisher, 30th Communications Squadron)

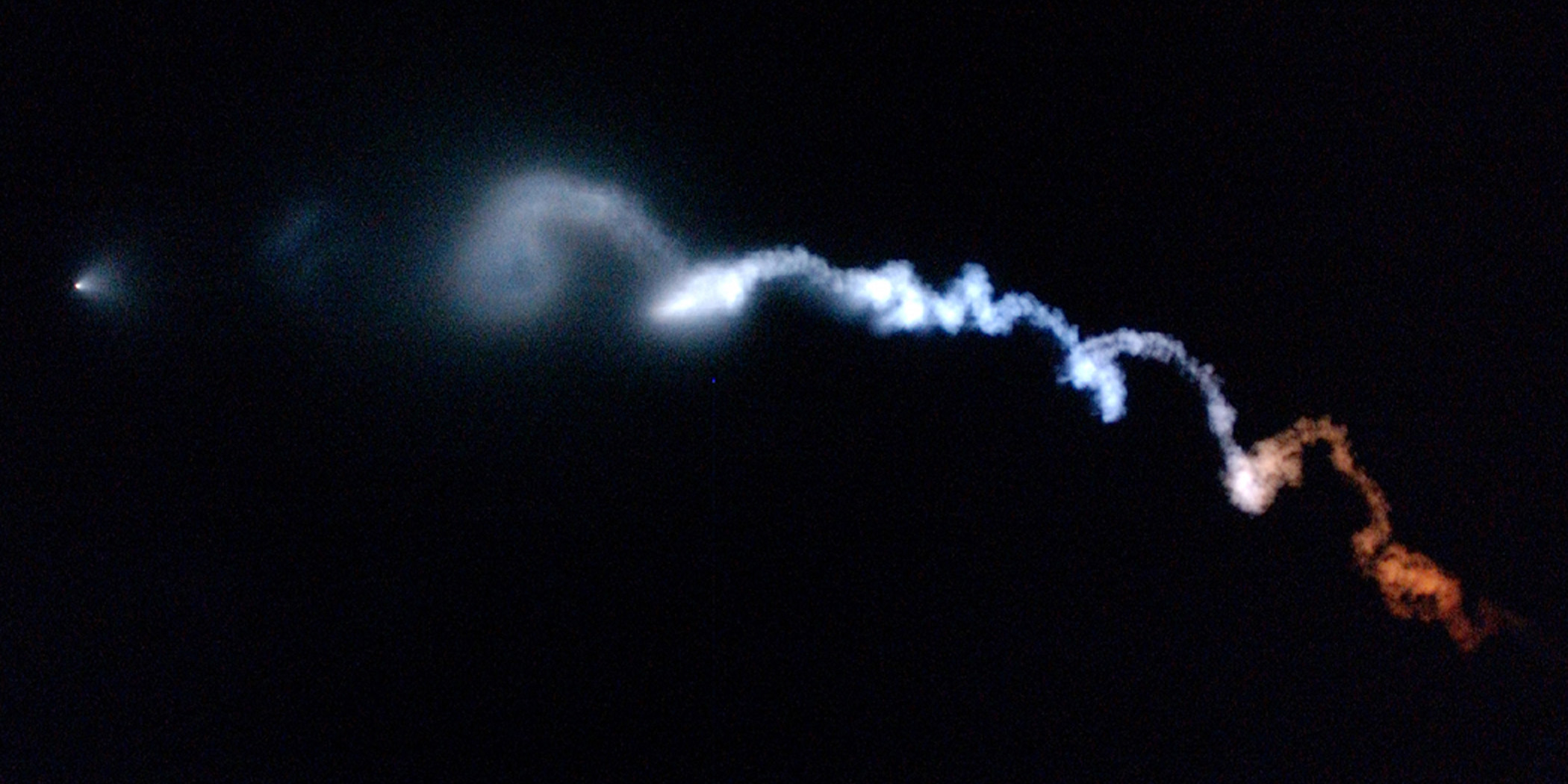
Twilight phenomenon caused by freezing unspent fuel from a Minotaur I launch at Vandenberg AFB, CA in Sept. 2005

Twilight phenomenon is produced when exhaust particles from missile or rocket propellant left in the vapor trail of a launch vehicle condense, freeze, and then expand in the less dense upper atmosphere. The exhaust plume, which is suspended against a dark sky, is then illuminated by reflective high-altitude sunlight through dispersion, which produces a spectacular, colorful effect when seen at ground level. A similar effect is the space jellyfish.

The phenomenon typically occurs with launches that take place either 30 to 60 minutes before sunrise or after sunset when a booster rocket or missile rises out of the darkness and into a sunlit area, relative to an observer's perspective on the ground. Because rocket trails extend high into the stratosphere and mesosphere, they catch high-altitude sunlight long after the sun has set on the ground. The small particles in the expanding exhaust plume or "cloud" diffract sunlight and produce the rose, blue, green and orange colors—much like a dispersive prism can be used to break light up into its constituent spectral colors (the colors of the rainbow).

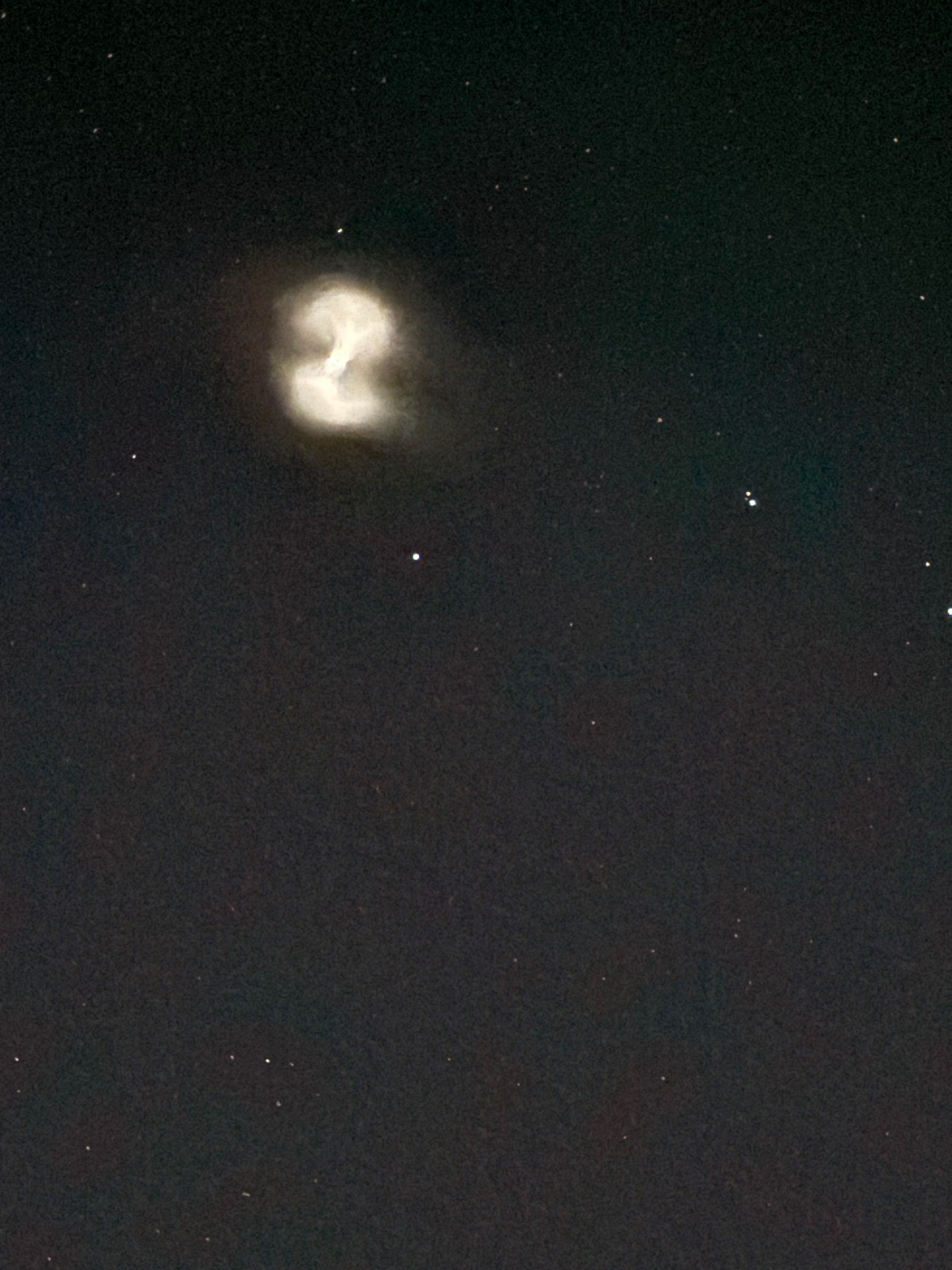
This 2025 space jellyfish was caused by an upper stage venting leftover fuel, and was seen across much of the eastern seaboard of North America. Here it is seen as it passes through the handle of the Big Dipper.

The effect may also be seen when the second stage fires or releases unburned fuel. This can occur at higher altitudes and be seen across a much wider area.

The exhaust plume may also take on a corkscrew appearance as it is whipped around by upper-level wind currents. It is typically seen within two to three minutes after a launch has occurred. Depending on weather conditions, it could remain in the sky for up to half an hour before dispersing.

At Vandenberg Space Force Base in California, more than 2,000 missiles and space boosters have been launched from the central California coastline in northern Santa Barbara County since December 1958. However, only a small percentage of these launches have created the twilight phenomenon. The same is true with the U.S. Navy's Strategic Systems Programs, which conducts Trident II (D5) missile test flights at sea from Ohio Class SSBN submarines in the Pacific Test Range off the coast of Southern California, or Kokola Point at Barking Sands on the Hawaiian island of Kauai.

Some observers have wrongly assumed the missile or rocket creating the aerial spectacle must have malfunctioned or been destroyed while in flight. That belief stems from the appearance of the launch vehicle's contrail as it becomes twisted into knots by upper altitude air currents or wind shear. To date, no malfunctioning missile or rocket has been known to create the phenomenon. On the rare occasions when a missile or rocket does malfunction, it is destroyed by a Range Safety Officer before reaching the altitudes where twilight phenomenon occurs.

The phenomenon's appearance and intensity varies with viewer location and weather conditions—typically, clear skies with no moonlight, since cloud cover would block one's view. The phenomenon can usually be seen throughout the state of California, and as far away as Arizona, Nevada and Utah. On the East Coast, similar sightings were observed and reported during twilight launches of the Space Shuttle from NASA's Kennedy Space Center, and observed after other expendable launch vehicles from the U.S. Space Force's launch complexes at Cape Canaveral Space Force Station in Florida.

Numerous nations with a space program — such as the European Space Agency, the Russian Space Agency, the China National Space Agency, Japan's JAXA, India's ISRO and other countries have experienced the same event.

== Examples ==
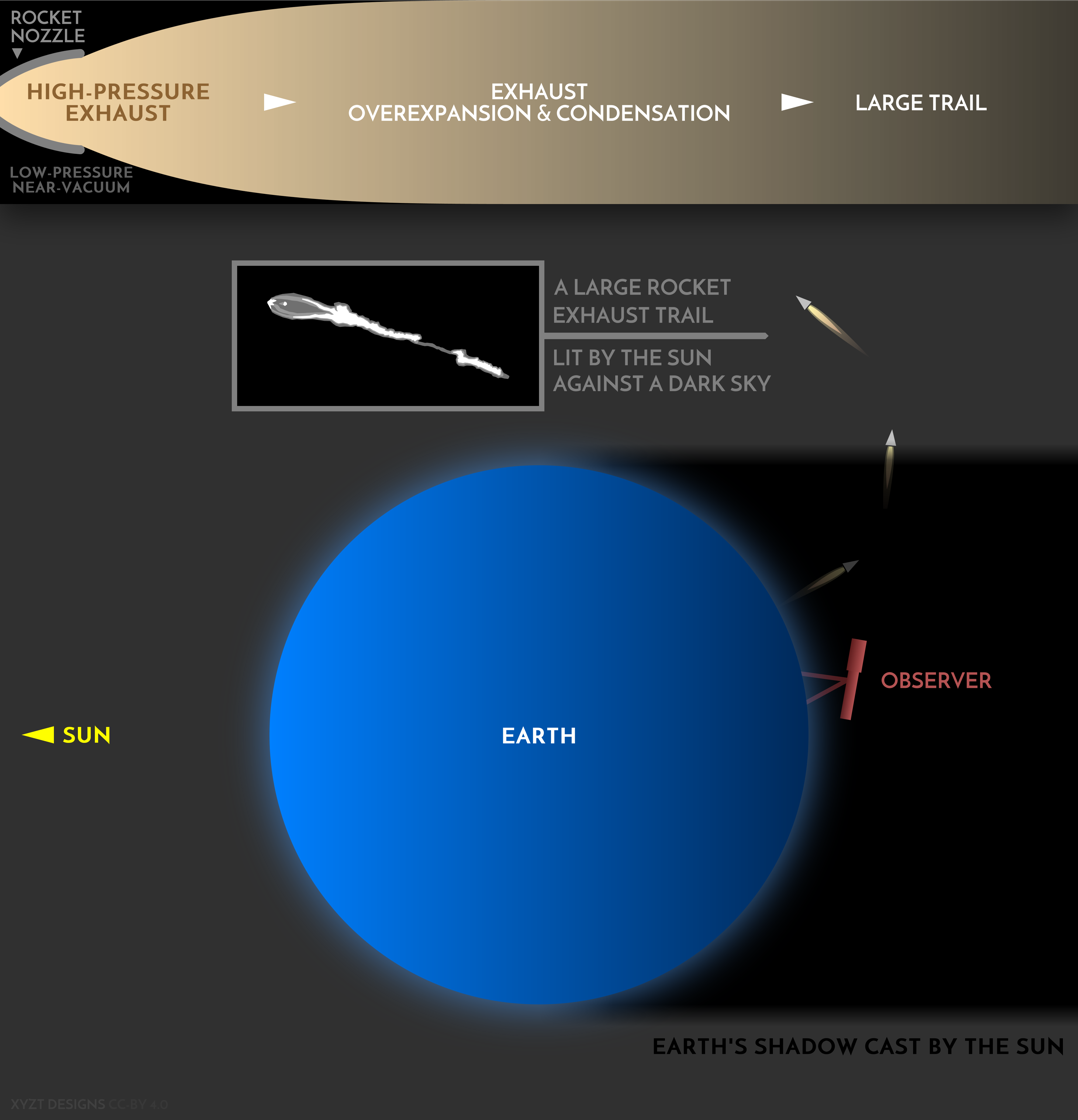
Infographic showing the conditions required for the phenomenon.

- In 2010 a contrail off the coast of Los Angeles, California led observers to believe they had seen a missile launch.
- On July 7, 2010, reports of a "UFO" sighting forced Xiaoshan Airport in Hangzhou, China to temporarily cease operations. A flight crew preparing for descent saw the object—suspected to be a Chinese rocket test—as a bright twinkling light apparently above the runway, and notified the air traffic control department. ATC could not locate it on radar and diverted landing flights. Eighteen flights were affected. Though normal operations resumed four hours later, the incident captured the attention of the Chinese media and sparked a firestorm of speculation on the UFO's identity.
- On November 7, 2015 a bright plume of light was seen expanding then "exploding" over south California between 7-8pm. The Orange County Sheriff confirmed that it was a Trident II ballistic missile test firing from the USS Kentucky.

== See also ==
- Noctilucent clouds
- Space jellyfish

== Video ==
- RUS Progress MS-10 launch, as seen from the International Space Station over Baikonur, Kazakhstan Taken by ESA astronaut Alexander Gerst, Nov. 16, 2018
- SpaceX Iridium 4 launch, as seen from Alhambra, Calif. Misrraim Sanchez YouTube video, Dec. 22, 2017
- Iridium NEXT IV launch, as seen from Manhattan Beach, Calif. Scott Gauer YouTube video, Dec. 22, 2017
- SpaceX Falcon 9 Launch, Boostback, Entry Burn Justin Foley's YouTube video, Dec. 22, 2017
- SpaceX launch video from Phoenix news helicopter Entire raw video as seen from PenguinAir Newschopper flying above Phoenix, Arizona Dec. 22, 2017
- Explaining The Amazing Rocket Trail Over LA Scott Manley's YouTube video, Dec. 24, 2017
- Falcon 9 rocket launch provides spectacular view in Bakersfield KBAK-29 Eyewitness News / KBFX-58 Fox News / BakersfieldNow.com (via YouTube), Dec. 22, 2017
- Justin Majeczky's 40-second time lapse of U.S. Navy Trident II (D5) missile test, as seen from San Francisco Vimeo, Nov. 8, 2015
- Missile launch over San Francisco YouTube video, Nov. 8, 2015
- Atlas V Rocket Launch view from East Orlando, Florida YouTube video Sept 2, 2015
- Night Time Launch Of Russian Space Rocket Heading To ISS YouTube video Feb. 15, 2014
- Video of "UFO" over Xiaoshan Airport in Hangzhou, China YouTube video July 7, 2010
