= Fall streaks =

Fall streaks may refer to:

- Praecipitatio, a visual appearance of precipitation reaching the ground
- Virga, a visual appearance of precipitation which doesn't reach the ground
- Fallstreak hole, a large circular gap that can appear in cirrocumulus or altocumulus clouds
