= Manuel Lujan Sr. =

American politician

Mayor of Santa Fe
- In office 1942–1948
- Preceded by: Alfredo Ortiz
- Succeeded by: Frank Ortiz

Personal details
- Born: Manuel Archibald Lujan; May 21, 1893 San Ildefonso Pueblo, New Mexico Territory, U.S.
- Died: June 5, 1975 (aged 82) Santa Fe, New Mexico, U.S.
- Party: Republican
- Spouse: Lorenzita Romero
- Children: Manuel Lujan Jr.
- Relatives: Michelle Lujan Grisham (great-grandniece)

Manuel Archibald Lujan Sr. (May 21, 1893 – June 5, 1975) was an American politician from the state of New Mexico. A Republican, he served as mayor of Santa Fe, New Mexico from 1942 until 1948.

== Biography ==
Lujan was born in San Ildefonso Pueblo, New Mexico in 1893, to Martin Lujan and Zenaida Sanchez. In 1942, he took office as mayor of Santa Fe, and served until 1948. Lujan unsuccessfully ran for the United States House of Representatives in 1944. In 1948, he was the Republican nominee for Governor of New Mexico. He lost to incumbent Democrat Thomas J. Mabry and received 45% of the vote.

== Personal life ==
Lujan's wife was Lorenzita Romero. He was the father of Manuel Lujan Jr., who served 20 years as a U.S. representative and then as United States Secretary of the Interior under George H. W. Bush from 1989 until 1993. He was also a great-granduncle of Michelle Lujan Grisham, the incumbent governor of New Mexico since 2019 and who also served as a U.S. representative for six years.

Party political offices
Preceded by Edward Safford	Republican nominee for Governor of New Mexico; 1948	Succeeded by Edwin L. Mechem
