= Andrew H. Hudspeth =

American jurist (1874–1948)

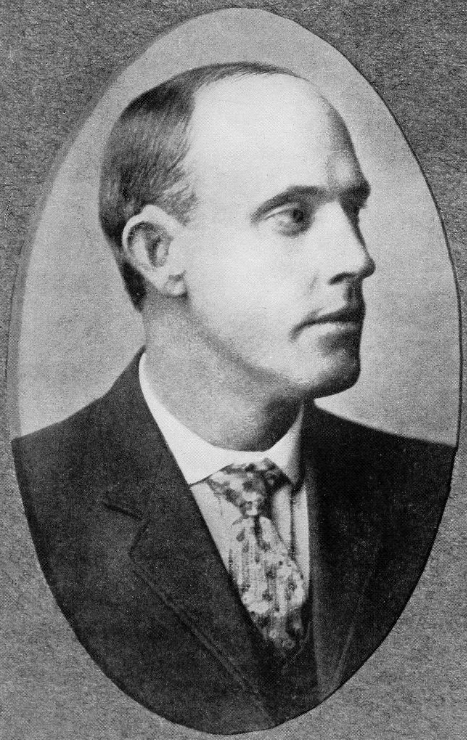

Justice of the New Mexico Supreme Court
- In office 1931–1938, 1946

Personal details
- Born: October 23, 1874 Greenville, Texas, US
- Died: March 10, 1948 (aged 73) Pasadena, California, US

Andrew H. Hudspeth (October 23, 1874 – March 10, 1948) was an American attorney in New Mexico. He served as an associate justice and chief justice of the New Mexico Supreme Court, from January 1, 1931 to December 31, 1938, and again from April 1, 1946 to December 31, 1946.

== Biography ==
Hudspeth was born in Greenville, Fannin County, Texas, on October 23, 1874. He studied law at Cumberland University in Tennessee and moved to Lincoln County, New Mexico in 1894 when he was first admitted to the state bar. From 1902 to 1913, Hudspeth worked in private practice with judge John Y. Hewitt. Hudspeth represented his district for one term in the New Mexico territorial legislature in 1907 as a Democrat. He served as a delegate to the state's 1910 Constitutional Convention, and in 1912, at the time of the election of William C. McDonald as the first governor after statehood, Hudspeth was chair of the New Mexico Democratic Party. From 1913 to 1921 Hudspeth served as the first U.S. Marshall for the state of New Mexico. He served for a time as a state trial court judge, and was "remembered as presiding over the trial of Bessie Hart", who had tried to shoot a man alleged to have been involved in her father's murder.

In 1930, Hudspeth won election to the New Mexico Supreme Court. He became chief justice on January 1, 1937, and on March 29, 1938, confirmed reports that he planned to retire at the end of his term to return to private practice, which he did on December 31, 1938. He returned to the Supreme Court in 1946 when Governor Dempsey appointed him to fill the rest of Justice Mabry's term when Mabry resigned that year. After Hudspeth left the bench, he returned to private practice in Carrizozo. He died in the Huntington Memorial Hospital in Pasadena, California, from cancer of the esophagus on March 10, 1948, at the age of 73. Hudspeth never married. He was cremated, and "his ashes were scattered over the White Oaks Mines" in New Mexico.

Legal offices
Preceded by Charles C. Catron; Thomas J. Mabry	Justice of the New Mexico Supreme Court; 1931–1938; 1946–1946	Succeeded by Thomas J. Mabry; James C. McGhee
