= Space jellyfish =

Rocket launch phenomenon

A space jellyfish (also jellyfish UFO or rocket jellyfish) is a rocket launch-related phenomenon caused by sunlight reflecting off the high-altitude rocket plume gases emitted by a launching rocket during morning or evening twilight. The observer is in darkness, while the exhaust plumes at high altitudes are in direct sunlight. This luminous apparition is reminiscent of a jellyfish. Sightings of the phenomenon have led to panic, fear of nuclear missile strike, and reports of unidentified flying objects.

A similar effect is the twilight phenomenon.

== List of rocket launches causing space jellyfish ==
Rocket launch		Payload	Date	Location	Summary	Ref.
Falcon 9	Bandwagon 5 launch on October, 20 2026.	Bandwagon 5 (Dedicated Mid-Inclination Rideshare)	20 October 2026	Florida SLC-40	Morning Launch (7:04 am EST) leads to jellyfish. Vibrant tentacles, faint head.	
Falcon 9		SpaceX CRS-35	13 October 2026	Florida SLC-40	Morning Launch (6:33 am EST) leads to jellyfish.	
Spectrum	Jellyfish on the livestream at 1:01:34 : https://www.youtube.com/live/Ss1DUqLjecc?si=XIY2gtkYMPGVONvZ	Mission 2 : Onward and Upward	5 September 2026	Andøya Space, Norway	Evening launch (10:12 pm CEST) creates a jellyfish.	
Falcon 9		Starlink Mission	22 April 2026	Vandenberg Space Force Base SLC-4E	Evening launch (8:23 pm PDT) creates a jellyfish.	
Falcon 9		Starlink Mission	28 September 2025	Vandenberg Space Force Base SLC-4E	Evening launch creates a jellyfish.	
Falcon 9		Starlink Group 10-26	26 July 2025	Florida SLC-40	Early morning (5:01AM) Starlink launch. Jellyfish caused by the rising Sun.	
Falcon 9		Starlink Mission	10 February 2025	Vandenberg Space Force Base California SLC-4E	Evening launch (6:09 PM) creates a jellyfish plume across California skies.	
Falcon 9		Starlink Mission	3 July 2024	Florida SLC-40		
Firefly Alpha flight FLTA005		Eight CubeSats	3 July 2024	Vandenberg Space Force Base		
Falcon 9 flight 361		Starlink Group 9-1	18 June 2024	Vandenberg Space Force Base		
Falcon 9 flight 339		Starlink Group 6-63	24 May 2024	Florida	Night-time Starlink launch. Jellyfish caused by moonlight.	
Falcon 9 flight 338		Starlink Group 6-62	23 May 2024	Florida	Night-time Starlink launch. Jellyfish caused by moonlight.	
Falcon 9 flight 232		Transporter 8	12 June 2023	Vandenberg Space Force Base	Afternoon launch – plume observed over Eastern Europe, approximately 75 minutes after launch	
Test flight of an unidentified Indian missile		None	15 December 2022	India, Myanmar, Bangladesh	An early evening test launch. Assumed to be of an Agni-V ICBM	
Falcon 9 flight 152		Starlink Group 4–17	6 May 2022	Florida	An early-morning launch causing UFO reports	
Falcon 9 flight 126		Inspiration4	15 September 2021	Florida	The first fully civilian crewed orbital spaceflight, launched from Cape Canaveral after sunset	
Soyuz-2.1.a launch		Progress MS-17	29 June 2021	European Russia	A Soyuz-2.1a launched the Progress MS-17 to the International Space Station from Baikonur Site 31 on 29 June 2021. As the rocket reached the upper atmosphere the expanded rocket plume was illuminated by the Sun, creating a "jellyfish".	
Falcon 9 flight 114		SpaceX Crew-2	23 April 2021	Florida	A crewed Cape Canaveral launch in the pre-dawn. The "jellyfish" lasted over 10 minutes after liftoff. In addition to the "jellyfish" created by the second stage, the returning first stage also made visible plumes.	
Falcon 9 flight 62		SAOCOM 1A	8 October 2018	California	A West Coast launch off California, in the post-dusk; causing UFO reports	
Falcon 9 flight 57		SpaceX CRS-15	29 June 2018	Florida	An East Coast launch off Florida, in the pre-dawn	
Soyuz-2.1.b launch		Glonass-M satellite	17 June 2018	European Russia	A launch from the Plesetsk Cosmodrome heading over the cities of Nizhny Novgorod and Kazan, Russia	
Falcon 9 flight 46		SpaceX Iridium 4 (Note: Iridium-NEXT launch SpaceX-4)	22 December 2017	California	A West Coast launch off California, in the post-dusk	
Atlas V 551 AV-056 flight		MUOS-4 (Note: U.S. Navy Mobile User Objective System satellite)	2 September 2015	Florida	A Cape Canaveral launch in the pre-dawn	
		Meteor-M2 weather satellite	8 July 2014	European Russia	A launch from Baikonur Cosmodrome, Kazakhstan	
RS-12M Topol-M nuclear missile test launch		—N/a	10 October 2013	Eurasia	Launched from Kapustin Yar, Russia; to crash into Sary Shagan, Kazakhstan	
		Kosmos 1188	14 June 1980	European Russia	A launch from Plesetsk Cosmodrome resulted in a giant U-shaped jellyfish appearing over Moscow and Kalinin, Russia	
		Kosmos 955	20 September 1977	Northern Europe	A launch from Plesetsk Cosmodrome resulted in a jellyfish vapour trail seen over northern Europe, causing the UFO incident known as the "Petrozavodsk phenomenon"	

== See also ==
- Noctilucent cloud
- Exhaust gas
- Contrail
- Twilight phenomenon
