= Robert Ellsworth =

American politician (1926–2011)

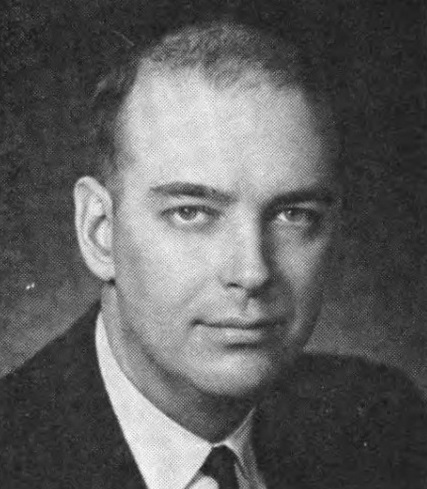

16th United States Deputy Secretary of Defense
- In office December 23, 1975 – January 10, 1977
- President: Gerald Ford
- Preceded by: Bill Clements
- Succeeded by: Charles Duncan Jr.

7th United States Permanent Representative to NATO
- In office May 13, 1969 – June 30, 1971
- President: Richard Nixon
- Preceded by: Harlan Cleveland
- Succeeded by: David M. Kennedy

Member of the U.S. House of Representatives from Kansas
- In office January 3, 1961 – January 3, 1967
- Preceded by: Newell A. George
- Succeeded by: Larry Winn
- Constituency: 2nd district (1961-1963); 3rd district (1963-1967)

Personal details
- Born: June 11, 1926 Lawrence, Kansas, U.S.
- Died: May 9, 2011 (aged 84) Encinitas, California, U.S.
- Party: Republican
- Education: University of Kansas; University of Michigan Law School

Military service
- Allegiance: United States of America
- Branch/service: United States Navy
- Battles/wars: World War II; Korean War

Robert Fred Ellsworth (June 11, 1926 – May 9, 2011) was an American legislator and diplomat. He served as the United States Permanent Representative to NATO (an ambassadorial-level appointment) between 1969 and 1971. He had previously served three terms as a Republican Member of Congress from Kansas, from 1961 to 1967, and as an Assistant to the President during the presidency of Richard Nixon; under President Gerald Ford, he was Deputy Secretary of Defense. Ellsworth also served as assistant to the chairman of the Federal Maritime Commission.

== Life and career ==
Ellsworth was born in Lawrence, Kansas, and was educated in the public schools of that city. He served in the United States Navy during World War II and the Korean War. In 1945, he was graduated with a baccalaureate in engineering from the University of Kansas, where he had been a member of the Alpha Nu chapter of the Beta Theta Pi collegiate fraternity. He then studied law at the University of Michigan Law School, from which he was graduated in 1949; he practiced law in Lawrence, Kansas, and in Springfield, Massachusetts.

The retired ambassador was admitted to the Order of Saint John as a knight of honor in 1995.

While serving as a congressman for Kansas's 1st congressional district, Ellsworth voted present for the 24th Amendment to the U.S. Constitution. However, during his tenure as representative for Kansas's 3rd congressional district, Ellsworth voted in favor of the Civil Rights Acts of 1964 and the Voting Rights Act of 1965.

On November 9, 2010, Ellsworth provided commentary to KFMB regarding an unexplained vapor trail in the airspace off the coast of Los Angeles which, at the time, was widely speculated to be a missile launch. He cautioned the news crew to wait for definitive answers from the military, then went on to theorize: "It could be a test firing of an intercontinental ballistic missile from a submarine, an underwater submarine, to demonstrate, mainly to Asia, that we could do that."

Ellsworth died in Encinitas, California: near the small city of Solana Beach, where he had founded and directed a research firm, Hamilton BioVentures.

U.S. House of Representatives
Preceded by Newell A. George	Member of the U.S. House of Representatives from Kansas's 2nd congressional district January 3, 1961 – January 3, 1963	Succeeded by William H. Avery
Preceded by Walter L. McVey Jr.	Member of the U.S. House of Representatives from Kansas's 3rd congressional district January 3, 1963 – January 3, 1967	Succeeded by Larry Winn
