= Larry Winn =

American politician

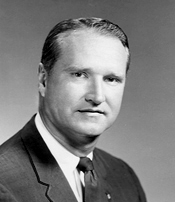

Member of the U.S. House of Representatives from Kansas's 3rd district
- In office January 3, 1967 – January 3, 1985
- Preceded by: Robert Ellsworth
- Succeeded by: Jan Meyers

Personal details
- Born: Edward Lawrence Winn Jr. August 22, 1919 Kansas City, Missouri, U.S.
- Died: December 31, 2017 (aged 98) Prairie Village, Kansas, U.S.
- Party: Republican
- Spouse: Joan Elliott (died 2015)
- Education: University of Kansas (BA)

Edward Lawrence Winn Jr. (August 22, 1919 – December 31, 2017) was an American politician and member of the U.S. House of Representatives representing Kansas's 3rd district from 1967 to 1985. He was a member of the Republican Party.

Born in Kansas City, Missouri, Winn participated in athletics at Southwest High School before losing one of his legs in a boating accident at Lake Lotawana when he was sixteen. He earned a B.A. in journalism from University of Kansas in 1941. After graduating, Winn worked for a Kansas City radio station for two years and, during World War II, worked for North American Aviation at Fairfax Field, north of Kansas City, Kansas, where the B-25 Mitchell bomber was manufactured. He then pursued a career in home building and was vice president of the Winn-Rau Corporation from 1950 until his election to Congress. Additionally, he was a director of the National Association of Home Builders for fourteen years and was president of the Home Builders Association of Kansas.

Winn was first elected to the U.S. House of Representatives as a Republican from the Wyandotte and Johnson Counties-based 3rd congressional district in 1966, succeeding three-term congressman Robert Ellsworth, and would be reelected eight more times until his retirement in 1984. During his tenure, he served on the House Committee on Foreign Affairs and was a congressional representative to the United Nations. He was succeeded by fellow Republican Jan Meyers.

Winn met his wife, Joan Elliott, while attending college and the two would be married for seventy-three years until her death in 2015. Together, they had five children; the death of their son Robert in 1983 played a part in the senior Winn's decision to retire from Congress. He lived in Prairie Village until his death on December 31, 2017, at age 98.

U.S. House of Representatives
Preceded by Robert Ellsworth	Member of the U.S. House of Representatives from Kansas's 3rd congressional district 1967–1985	Succeeded by Jan Meyers
Preceded by John W. Wydler	Ranking Member of the House Science Committee; 1981–1985	Succeeded by Manuel Lujan Jr.
