= Manuel Lujan Jr. =

American politician (1928–2019)

Manuel Luján
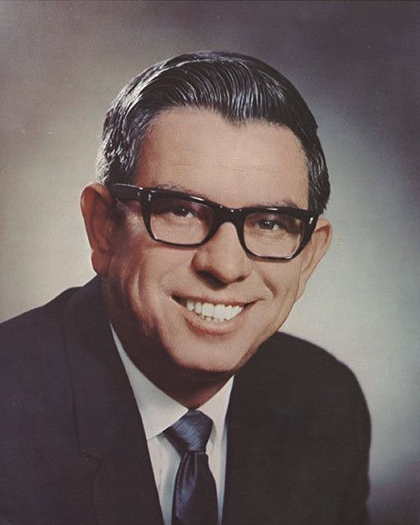

46th United States Secretary of the Interior
- In office February 3, 1989 – January 20, 1993
- President: George H. W. Bush
- Preceded by: Donald P. Hodel
- Succeeded by: Bruce Babbitt

Member of the U.S. House of Representatives from New Mexico's 1st district
- In office January 3, 1969 – January 3, 1989
- Preceded by: Thomas G. Morris (redistricted)
- Succeeded by: Steven Schiff

Personal details
- Born: Manuel Archibald Lujan Jr. May 12, 1928 San Ildefonso Pueblo, New Mexico, U.S.
- Died: April 25, 2019 (aged 90) Albuquerque, New Mexico, U.S.
- Party: Republican
- Spouse: Jean Lujan
- Children: 4
- Parent: Manuel Lujan Sr. (father)
- Relatives: Michelle Lujan Grisham (second cousin, twice removed)
- Education: Saint Mary's College, California (attended); College of Santa Fe (BA)

Manuel Archibald Lujan Jr. (May 12, 1928 – April 25, 2019) was an American politician from New Mexico who sat in the U.S. House of Representatives as a Republican from 1969 to 1989 and was the United States secretary of the interior from 1989 to 1993. He was a colleague of George H. W. Bush in the House from 1969 to 1971. In 1989, President Bush named Lujan to his cabinet.

== Early life and education ==
Lujan was born in San Ildefonso Pueblo, New Mexico, into the family of Manuel A. Lujan Sr. and Lorenzita (née Romero) Lujan. His father was Mayor of Santa Fe and was an unsuccessful candidate for governor and congress. Lujan attended Catholic schools in Santa Fe. He attended Saint Mary's College of California in 1946 and graduated from the St. Michael's College in Santa Fe in 1950. (Note: Source says Lujan graduated from the College of Santa Fe in 1950, which at that time was known as St. Michael's College)

== Career ==
After college, Lujan went to work for the family insurance company, the Manuel Lujan Agencies, which his father had opened in 1925. The Albuquerque-based company remains a leading risk management and insurance firm and, in 2002, it was ranked as the most profitable of New Mexico's Hispanic-owned businesses.

Lujan also followed his father into politics, launching his first campaign with a failed bid for the New Mexico State Senate in 1964. Three years later, he helped to found the Republican National Hispanic Assembly. Lujan's failed 1964 bid for political office was his last electoral defeat; after defeating the incumbent Rep. Thomas G. Morris in 1968, he sat in Congress for the next two decades.

== Congress ==
Throughout the 1970s, Lujan was re-elected and built a reputation as a low-key, personable backbencher. His legislative interests were largely in line with the western U.S. states' priorities of the time, including Indian affairs, nuclear power expansion and the opening of federal lands to commerce and recreation. In 1978, he was the first Hispanic Republican to join the recently formed Congressional Hispanic Caucus.

The 1980s brought new challenges and new prominence for Lujan. He nearly lost his seat in 1980 to an unexpectedly strong challenge from the Democrat Bill Richardson. In the reapportionment that followed, Lujan's district was significantly altered after New Mexico gained a third district. The old 1st was a largely rural district that included the northeastern portion of the state, including most of Albuquerque. The new 1st was a much more compact and urban district that included three-quarters of Albuquerque.

Due to the new demographics of his district, Lujan stood down as ranking Republican of the House Interior and Insular Affairs Committee and became ranking Republican of the House Science, Space and Technology Committee.

In addition to his congressional duties, Lujan represented New Mexico as a delegate to every Republican National Convention from 1972 to 2004. In 1980, he was a featured speaker at the convention on the night delegates met to nominate a vice presidential candidate.

== Secretary of the Interior (1989–1993) ==
Beginning with Ronald Reagan's inauguration in 1981, Lujan was often mentioned as a potential nominee for interior secretary. Along with Dick Cheney, he was one of the top contenders to replace James G. Watt following his resignation, although the position eventually went to William Clark.

When the Bush transition team approached Lujan about the job in late 1988, he declined to accept it, but changed his mind only after a personal appeal from the president-elect. After the tenure of James Watt and Donald Hodel, Lujan was widely regarded as a moderate at the time of his unanimous confirmation in February 1989. His nomination faced little opposition, although some environmental groups criticized his congressional voting record (the League of Conservation Voters gave Lujan a 23 percent career rating).

=== Early tenure ===
Just months into his term, Lujan came under criticism from conservationists and the media for his hands-off approach to policy and his gaffe-prone speeches. In one oft-quoted error, he told a reporter that the federal government received royalty payments for certain mineral rights, only to later admit "I didn't know what I was talking about."

=== Offshore oil drilling ===
As the chairman of a White House task force studying offshore oil drilling, Lujan expressed his strong support for drilling off the California coast in a speech to western governors. 19 members of the California congressional delegation — all Democrats — and Republican Governor Pete Wilson called for Lujan to resign from the study group because he was prejudiced to one point of view but Lujan declined to step down.

As the administration point man on offshore drilling, he opposed Democratic efforts to halt the practice after the Exxon Valdez oil spill in April 1989.

=== Endangered Species Act ===
Although Lujan gained more respect throughout his term, he remained a lightning rod for environmentalists. In a 1990 interview, he described the Endangered Species Act as "too tough", and said it may not be necessary to "save every subspecies". The Bush administration distanced itself from Lujan's position at a time when newspapers had just begun to write about the interior secretary's rebound from earlier public relations woes.

=== 1992–1993 ===
Other notable events of Lujan's term included frequent debates over the spotted owl, the construction of the Washington Commanders NFL football team stadium on federal property in Washington, D.C., and the increased regulation of Indian casinos. Lujan generally won praise for his handling of Indian affairs, an interest he had pursued earlier while in Congress.

After leaving the Interior Department at the end of Bush's term, Lujan characterized his job as one of constant tensions. "No one is satisfied. If you do something that's pro-development, you get the environmental groups against you, and if you do something that's pro-environmental you get the industry groups after you," Lujan said in a May 9, 1993, Associated Press report. "What I tried to do — and I think I was successful in doing — was to bring a balance between the use of resources on public lands and environmental concerns."

== Post-Washington days ==
In the waning months of his term, Lujan was frequently named as a likely candidate for Governor of New Mexico in 1994. He squelched the rumors, saying he was "through running."

After leaving office, Lujan worked as a lobbyist and a public speaker. In 2004, he launched the Hispanic Alliance for Progress Institute, a conservative think-tank focusing on economic and "family values" issues from a Hispanic perspective.

Lujan's tenure at the Interior Department has since been commemorated with an award in his honor. Each year, the department presents the "Manuel Lujan Jr. Champion Award" to employees who exhibit "outstanding work in carrying out the department's mission". In addition, the department and its Bureau of Indian Affairs honored Lujan by dedicating the BIA's administrative building in Albuquerque with Lujan's name.

Lujan's brother Edward (b. 1931) was the New Mexico Republican Party chairman for many years and was a major influence in the development of the National Hispanic Cultural Center.

== Personal life ==
Lujan died of heart failure on April 25, 2019, in Albuquerque.

== See also ==
- List of Hispanic and Latino Americans in the United States Congress

== Notes ==
U.S. House of Representatives
Preceded by Thomas G. Morris	Member of the U.S. House of Representatives from New Mexico's 1st congressional district 1969–1989	Succeeded by Steven Schiff
Preceded by Don Clausen	Ranking Member of the House Interior and Insular Affairs Committee; 1981–1985	Succeeded by Don Young
Preceded by Larry Winn	Ranking Member of the House Science Committee; 1985–1989	Succeeded by Bob Walker
Political offices
Preceded by Donald P. Hodel	United States Secretary of the Interior; 1989–1993	Succeeded by Bruce Babbitt
