= 2010 California contrail incident =

Aviation and aerial phenomenon-related incident

- Frame from the November 8, 2010 KCBS news helicopter video, which began media coverage of the story
- Date: November 8, 2010
- Location: Airspace approximately 35 miles (56 km) west of Los Angeles, California and north of Catalina Island
- Also known as: "Mystery missile" "Mystery contrail"
- Type: Aviation-related incident
- Cause: Speculated to be a contrail from U.S. Airways flight 808 or an RIM-161 Standard Missile
- Participants: Department of Defense; Federal Aviation Administration; KCBS

On the evening of Monday, November 8, 2010, an unusually conspicuous contrail appeared about 35 miles (56 km) west of Los Angeles, California, in the vicinity of Catalina Island. News footage (Note: November 9, 2010 CBS coverage of the event) of the event from a KCBS helicopter led to intense media coverage and speculation about a potential military missile launch, with many reporters and experts discussing the vapor trail and theorizing about its source. (Note: Media discussion of the incident:)

Coverage continued for several days. The Pentagon released a statement on November 9 that it could not identify the source of the vapor trail, but both the North American Aerospace Defense Command (NORAD) and U.S. Northern Command stated that it was not a foreign military launch. On November 9, the FAA also issued a statement that it had not approved any commercial space launches in the area for the prior day. On November 10, some 30 hours after the "mystery missile" first gained press attention, a Pentagon spokesman stated there was "no evidence to suggest" that the plume was anything but an aircraft contrail. Some experts, however, held that the vapor trail could not be conclusively identified as an aircraft contrail, and others stated it was a missile.

Although some question persisted about the vapor trail's origin, the incident came to be seen as an example of news outlets being "captives of their sources" and irresponsibly pushing unverified theses; it was also interpreted as a lesson in the importance of exploring alternative hypotheses that fit available data. U.S. federal and military authorities also faced criticism for what were described as "inconclusive" answers and for allowing the issue, in the words of one commentator, to "fester for days" without a clear resolution.

== Background ==
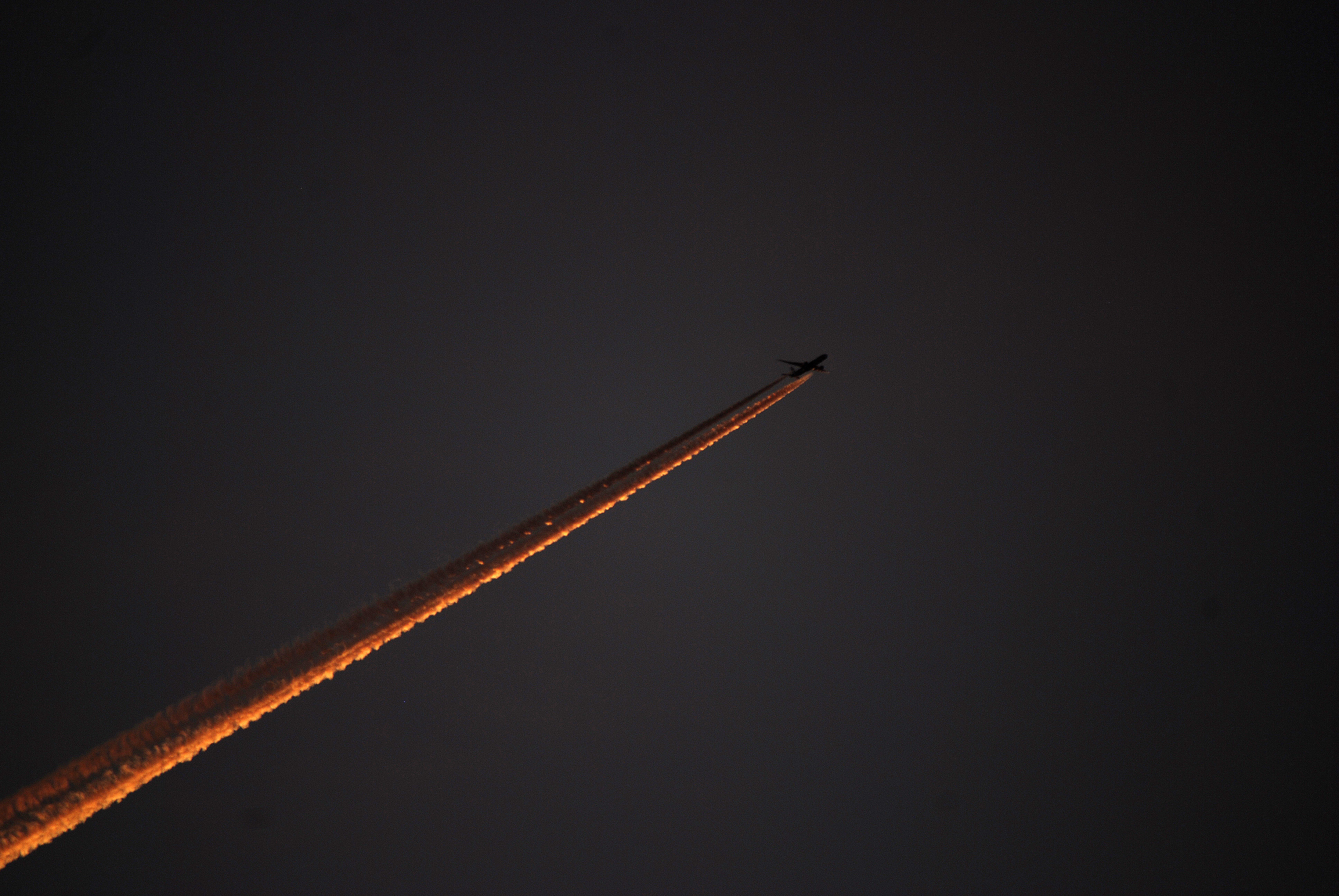
Contrail created by a KLM Boeing 777 over London, England at sunset in 2012

Contrails, short for "condensation trails," are linear cloud formations produced by aircraft exhaust, air pressure changes, or rocket emissions, usually at commercial cruising altitudes several miles above the ground. Contrails often only last for minutes, but can last for hours and expand to several miles across, coming to resemble naturally formed cirrus or altocumulus clouds.

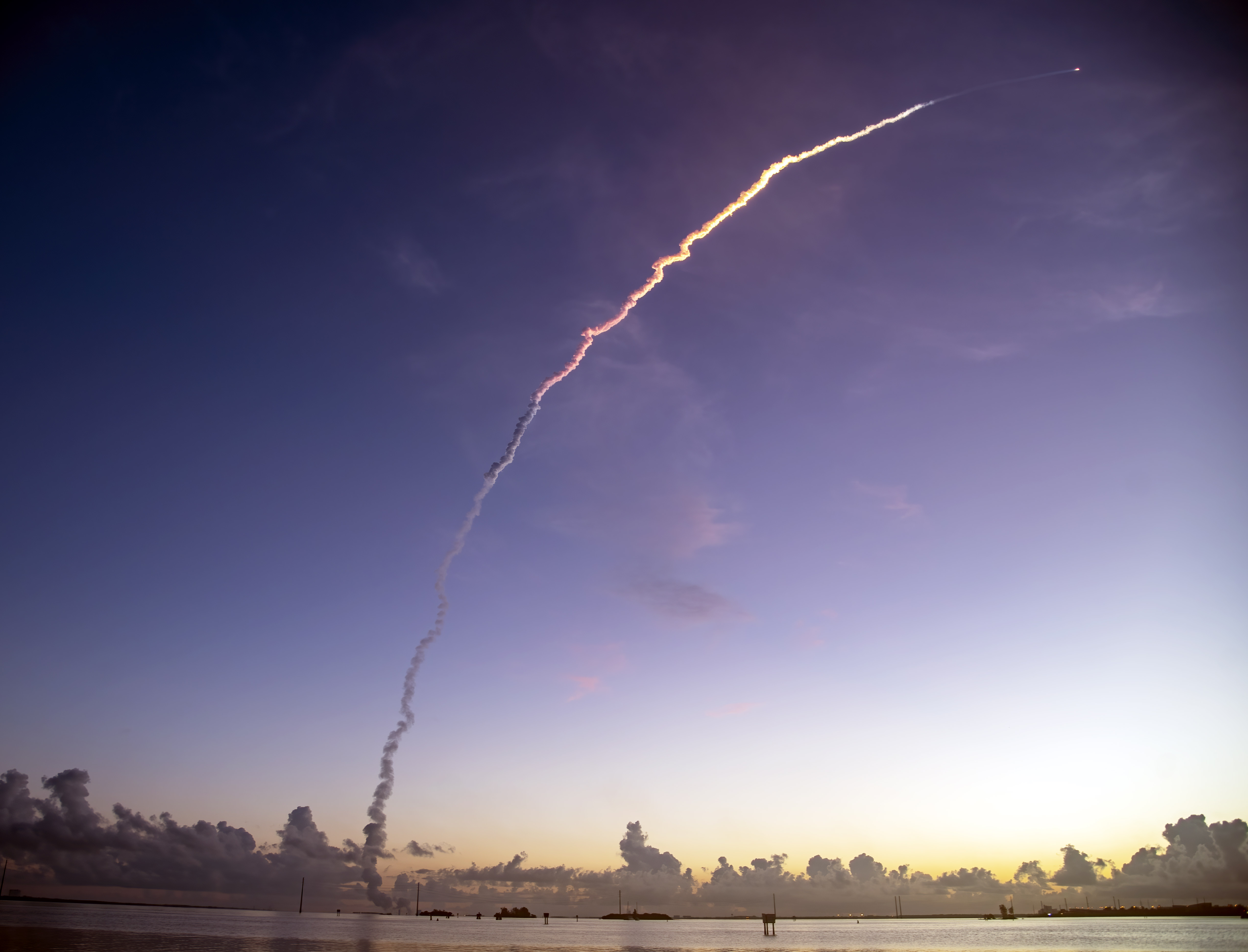
Vapor trail of an Atlas V 421 launch at Cape Canaveral in 2022

A contrail from an airplane flying towards an observer can create the illusion of a vertically moving object, as happened with a contrail off the coast of San Clemente, California on December 31, 2009, which some observers mistook for a missile launch. The San Clemente "New Year's Eve Contrail" was a horizontal trail at about 32,000 feet, or six miles, in altitude, that appeared to be oriented vertically due to the ground-level perspective from which it was observed and photographed. There are also historic examples of observers mistaking aircraft contrails for other phenomena, especially when contrails were still uncommon, including incidents in Galveston, Texas on October 27, 1951; in several areas of Iowa on April 15, 1950; and throughout the San Francisco Peninsula on January 11, 1950, when a B-50 Superfortress bomber flying at 35,000 feet caused many residents to call police stations to report a "burning plane," "meteors," and "flying saucers."

While a number of experts concluded that the 2010 "mystery missile" was simply a common aircraft contrail, other experts held that while an airplane was the most likely source a missile launch could not be entirely ruled out based on existing evidence. San Nicolas Island, approximately 75 miles west of Los Angeles and the site of a U.S. military installation, has hosted a number of secret operations. The 2010 incident occurred not far from San Nicolas, leading some experts to speculate about a connection between the vapor trail and activity on the island. On Friday, November 5, 2010, several days prior to the contrail incident, Vandenberg Air Force Base launched a Delta II rocket carrying a Thales Alenia Space-Italia COSMO SkyMed satellite, but a sergeant from Vandenberg informed CBS News 8 that there had been no subsequent launches.

== Incident and response ==
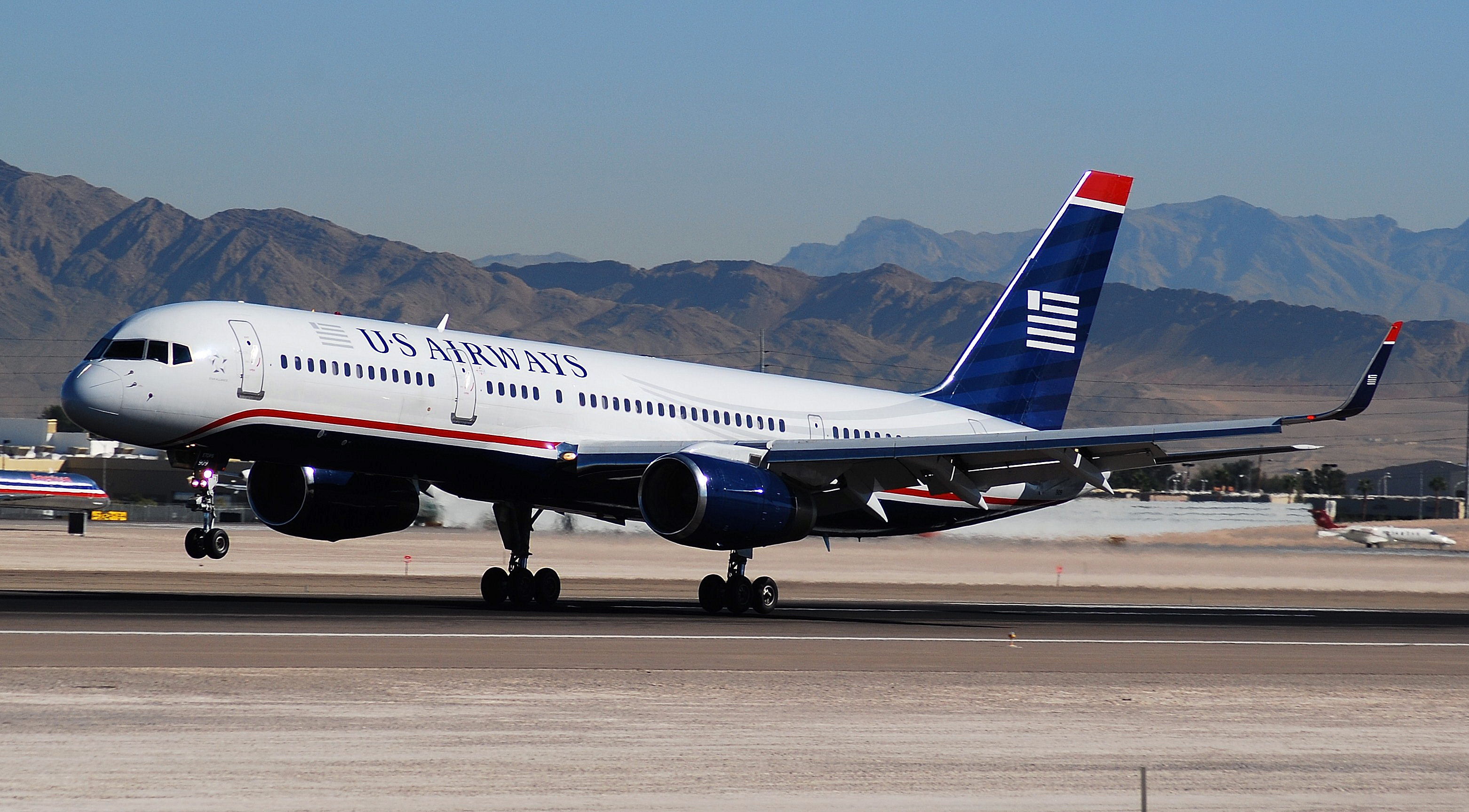
A Boeing 757-200 similar to U.S. Airways flight 808, (Note: Online record of flight AWE808) which was theorized to be the source of the contrail

At around 5:15 p.m. Pacific Time on Monday, November 8, 2010, a helicopter from the KCBS news station recorded the vapor trail of what was described as a "missile" about 35 miles (56 km) west of Los Angeles, California, and somewhat north of Catalina Island. It was later characterized as a "large vertical column set against the bright orange sky at sunset" and was clearly visible from the Los Angeles area. Scott Diener, the news director at KCBS, stated that the experts interviewed by his station on "Tuesday night and Wednesday morning had leaned toward the missile theory" to explain the vapor plume. Cameraman Gil Leyvas, who took the KCBS footage and had more than a decade of news helicopter experience, felt that "there was no comparison at all" between the trail he filmed and an airplane contrail, stating that it looked like a missile launch and was several times larger than a jetliner contrail. News anchors continued to cover the event and, by the end of Tuesday, it had attracted international press attention, being described as a "mystery missile" or "vapor trail reminiscent of a missile launch."

=== Analysis and public statements ===
Several experts argued that the plume was simply a jet contrail, yet others disagreed, and U.S. government authorities did not immediately reach a public conclusion about the vapor trail or its source. Pentagon spokesman Colonel David Lapan said that any missile test in the area was "implausible" due to the close proximity of the sighting to Los Angeles International Airport. Col. Lapan also stated that were no known airspace closures or notifications to mariners at the time of the incident as would be expected for a missile test. Robert Ellsworth, former U.S. Ambassador to NATO and former Deputy Secretary of Defense, stated to CBS News 8 that it did not appear to be a Tomahawk missile but, stressing it was only a theory, also remarked: "It could be a test firing of an intercontinental ballistic missile from an underwater submarine, to demonstrate mainly to Asia, that we can do that." (Note: Ellsworth was referring to the United States military, theorizing it could be an American missile launch) Ellsworth further said of the vapor trail: "It's spectacular...It takes people's breath away," and described the projectile as "a big missile." Doug Richardson, editor of Jane's Missiles and Rockets, said, "It's a solid propellant missile, you can tell from the efflux [smoke] but they're not showing enough of the tape to show whether it's staging [jettisoning its sections]." Richardson theorized it might be a standard interceptor missile of the type used by U.S. Navy Aegis guided-missile cruisers.

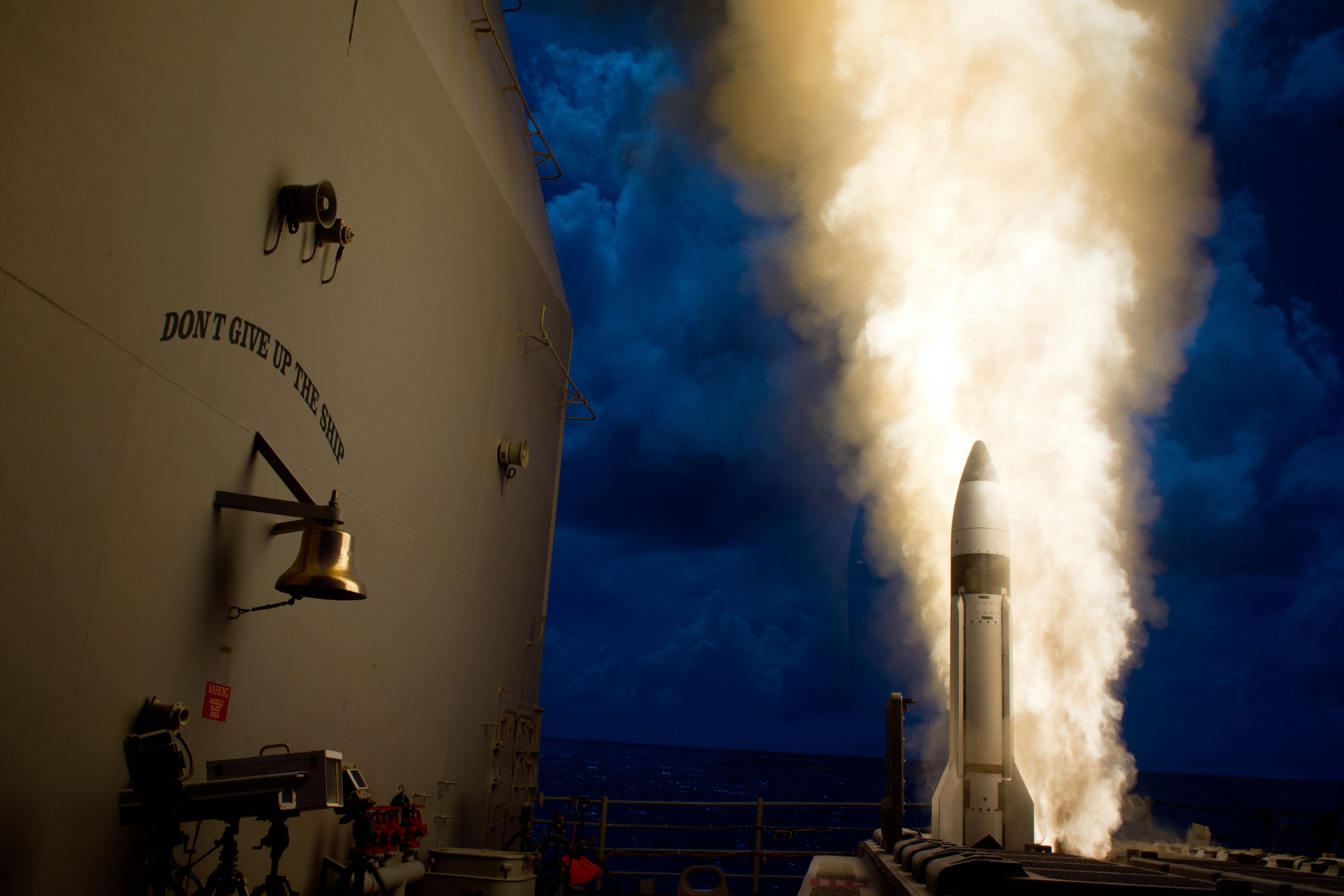
An RIM-161 Standard Missile was also theorized to be the cause

The United States Northern Command and the North American Aerospace Defense Command released a statement that "At this time, we can confirm that there is no threat to our nation and from all indications this was not a launch by a foreign military." The Pentagon released a statement on November 9 declaring that it could not identify the source of the vapor trail. Col. Lapan stated that officials were "still trying to find out what the contrail off the coast of southern California was caused by," but that "all indications are that it was not a DoD activity." The Pentagon determined that there was no "scheduled or inadvertent" missile launches off the coast of California on the night of November 8. Adm. Gary Roughead, Chief of Naval Operations, stated to The Washington Post that it "wasn't a Navy missile," yet declined to offer more detail.

The website ContrailScience.com produced a widely circulated report that explained how an airplane contrail moving directly toward a viewer has the appearance of rising vertically. The website referenced the December 31, 2009, San Clemente "New Year's Eve Contrail," a horizontal contrail which some observers thought was a vertical missile launch.

John E. Pike, the director of GlobalSecurity.org, stated that the flying object producing the vapor trail was not a missile because it was too slow, and described it as "obviously an airplane contrail." On Tuesday, Pike said that what the KCBS crew recorded was "clearly an airplane contrail. It's an optical illusion that looks like it's going up, whereas in reality it's going towards the camera. The tip of the contrail is moving far too slowly to be a rocket. When it's illuminated by the sunset, you can see hundreds of miles of it...all the way to the horizon." Light at the head of the contrail that was initially speculated to be an exhaust "flame" was later interpreted as sun reflecting from an aircraft exterior.

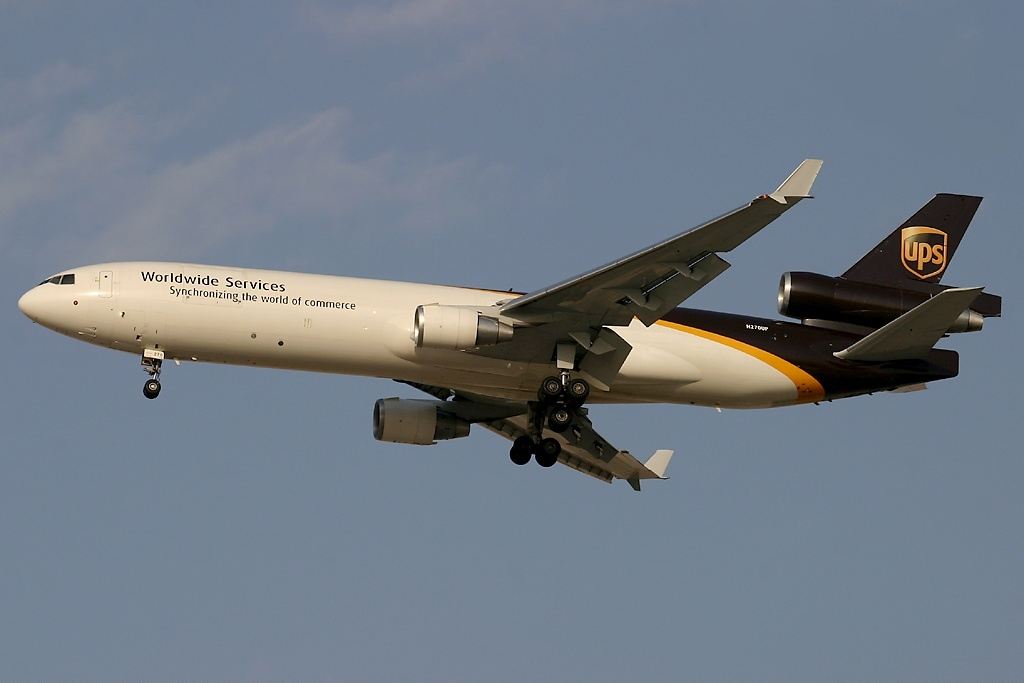
A UPS McDonnell Douglas MD-11 similar to UPS flight 902, (Note: Online record of flight UPS902) which was also theorized to be the source

As reported on November 10 by CNN, an unnamed official from the U.S. Northern Command stated that the vapor trail may have been caused by a plane, and likened it to observers mistaking the New Year's Eve contrail for a missile. FAA spokesman Ian Gregor stated: "The FAA ran radar replays of a large area west of Los Angeles based on media reports of the possible missile launch at approximately 5 p.m. (PT) on Monday. The radar replays did not reveal any fast moving, unidentified targets in that area...The FAA did not receive reports...of unusual sightings from pilots who were flying in the area on Monday afternoon." Eventually, on November 10, about 30 hours after the contrail first gained press attention, a Pentagon spokesman stated “there is no evidence to suggest that this is anything else other than a condensation trail from an aircraft.” U.S. Airways flight 808 from Honolulu, Hawaii—a Boeing 757-200—emerged as a candidate for the contrail's source. (Note: Online record of flight AWE808) UPS flight 902—a McDonnell Douglas/Boeing MD-11—was also raised as a possibility. (Note: Online record of flight UPS902)

Eventually, several news outlets came to report that the vapor trail was simply an airplane contrail or optical illusion, as some experts had stated. The public and news reaction to the event was characterized by CNN as the "mystery missile mania." Nonetheless, other experts continued to argue that the plume could not be conclusively identified. In a November 14, 2010, article, the New York Times quoted Theodore A. Postol, a former Pentagon science adviser and professor at the Massachusetts Institute of Technology, who stated that while he inclined to the jet explanation, he could not "rule out a missile launch."

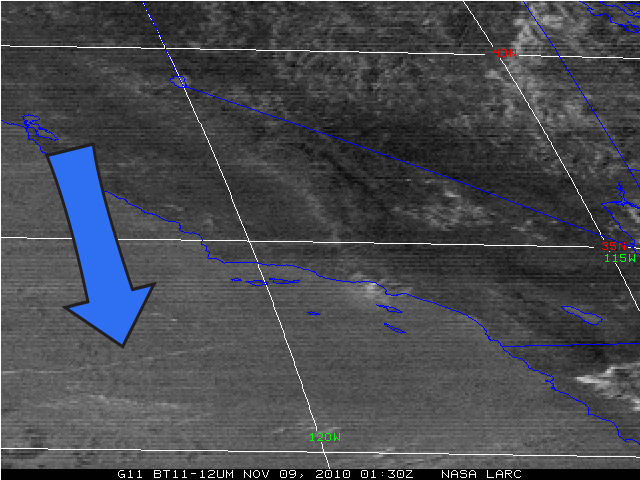
Image captured by the NASA/NOAA GOES 11 satellite on November 8, 2010, reported to show the contrail

=== Satellite imagery ===
On November 16, Space.com published an article discussing an image taken by the NASA/NOAA GOES 11 satellite on November 8 that reportedly showed the "mystery" contrail visible as a "horizontal white streak." NASA's own website also discussed the GOES 11 imagery in an article. Patrick Minnis, a contrail expert in the Science Directorate at the NASA Langley Research Center, said he first "assumed it was a missile" but after research concluded that an aircraft was the "most likely" source of the contrail. Doug Spangenberg, part of the Science Systems and Applications Inc. (SSAI) contract at Langley, sequenced imagery from the GOES 11 satellite and helped Minnis with his research.

== Aftermath ==
The November 14 New York Times article, published several days after the event, considered it an example of news outlets being "captives of their sources" and irresponsibly pushing unproven theses; it was also described as a lesson in the importance of exploring alternative hypotheses. U.S. federal and military authorities were criticized after the incident, particularly for what were called "inconclusive" answers and a perceived delay in resolving the issue.

Time magazine ranked the incident second on its "Top 10 Oddball News Stories" list for 2010, remarking how "within hours, the footage had been picked up by every major news network," but also observing that "as quickly as the mystery missile arrived on the scene...it was set aside." ABC News also mentioned the incident in a 2012 story about test missile launches from Fort Wingate and the White Sands Missile Range, recalling the 2010 "'mystery missile'...spotted off the coast of Southern California by a TV news helicopter." The Telegraph referred to the incident in a July 2017 article, stating how, in "November 2010, The Pentagon was left baffled by what was reported to be a 'mystery missile launch' off the coast of California." Live Science also mentioned the event in a 2017 article.

Uzi Rubin, former Director of Israel Missile Defense, cited the incident in a September 2014 briefing on Israeli Air Defense held in Washington, D.C. and broadcast by C-SPAN. Aviation Week Network reported on the briefing, describing how Rubin used "the November 2010 'mystery missile launch' seen from California" as an example of foreshortened perspective, to illustrate how observers can mistake the direction that a rocket is traveling.

== See also ==
- Contrail
- Twilight phenomenon
- Channel Islands (California)
- Robert Ellsworth
- Battle of Los Angeles
