= 1946 New Mexico gubernatorial election =

- November 5, 1946
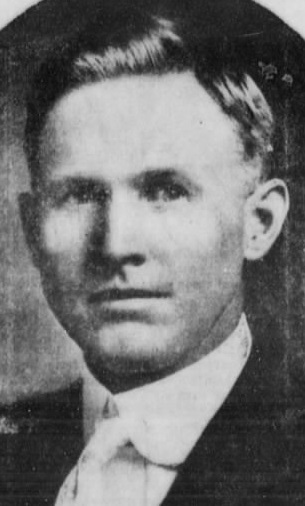

Nominee	Thomas J. Mabry	Edward L. Safford
Party	Democratic	Republican
Popular vote	70,055	62,575
Percentage	52.82%	47.18%
- County results Mabry: 50–60% 60–70% Safford: 50–60%
Governor before election
John J. Dempsey
Democratic
Elected Governor
Thomas J. Mabry
Democratic

The 1946 New Mexico gubernatorial election took place on November 5, 1946, in order to elect the Governor of New Mexico. Incumbent Democrat John J. Dempsey was term-limited, and could not run for reelection to a third consecutive term. Former lieutenant governor William Duckworth unsuccessfully sought the Republican nomination. Sandoval County voted for a Democratic candidate for the first time since 1916. This was the last gubernatorial election until 1982 in which the Democratic candidate carried Harding County.

== Primary election ==
=== Democratic primary ===
1946 Democratic primary election
Party	Candidate	Votes	%
Democratic	Thomas J. Mabry	23,293	37.06%
Democratic	William J. Barker	17,516	27.87%
Democratic	Burton Roach	10,692	17.01%
Democratic	R. H. Grissom	5,522	8.78%
Democratic	J. R. T. Herrera	3,639	5.79%
Democratic	Harley Gooch	2,198	3.50%
Total votes		62,862	100.00%

=== Republican primary ===
1946 Republican primary election
Party	Candidate	Votes	%
Republican	Edward L. Safford	8,683	52.82%
Republican	Ben F. Meyer	5,086	30.94%
Republican	William H. Duckworth	2,160	13.14%
Republican	Leon Feldhake	511	3.11%
Total votes		16,440	100.00%

== General election ==
=== Results ===
1946 New Mexico gubernatorial election
Party	Candidate	Votes	%	±%
Democratic	Thomas J. Mabry	70,055	52.82%	+1.01%
Republican	Edward L. Safford	62,575	47.18%	−1.01%
Majority		7,480	5.64%	
Total votes		132,930	100.00%	
Democratic hold		Swing	+2.03%	

=== Results by county ===
County	Thomas J. Mabry Democratic		Edward L. Safford Republican		Margin		Total votes cast
County	#	%	#	%	#	%	Total votes cast
Bernalillo	10,702	49.39%	10,967	50.61%	-265	-1.22%	21,669
Catron	614	54.63%	510	45.37%	104	9.25%	1,124
Chaves	2,559	51.38%	2,422	48.62%	137	2.75%	4,981
Colfax	2,269	50.97%	2,183	49.03%	86	1.93%	4,452
Curry	2,802	58.14%	2,017	41.86%	785	16.29%	4,819
De Baca	499	58.98%	347	41.02%	152	17.97%	846
Doña Ana	3,248	55.29%	2,626	44.71%	622	10.59%	5,874
Eddy	3,723	64.78%	2,024	35.22%	1,699	29.56%	5,747
Grant	3,004	61.46%	1,884	38.54%	1,120	22.91%	4,888
Guadalupe	1,348	49.13%	1,396	50.87%	-48	-1.75%	2,744
Harding	610	53.42%	532	46.58%	78	6.83%	1,142
Hidalgo	505	62.35%	305	37.65%	200	24.69%	810
Lea	1,968	67.47%	949	32.53%	1,019	34.93%	2,917
Lincoln	1,113	43.92%	1,421	56.08%	-308	-12.15%	2,534
Luna	1,198	57.02%	903	42.98%	295	14.04%	2,101
McKinley	1,869	56.08%	1,464	43.92%	405	12.15%	3,333
Mora	1,359	49.63%	1,379	50.37%	-20	-0.73%	2,738
Otero	1,353	50.69%	1,316	49.31%	37	1.39%	2,669
Quay	1,960	63.66%	1,119	36.34%	841	27.31%	3,079
Rio Arriba	4,173	52.78%	3,733	47.22%	440	5.57%	7,906
Roosevelt	1,585	56.35%	1,228	43.65%	357	12.69%	2,813
San Juan	1,243	46.69%	1,419	53.31%	-176	-6.61%	2,662
San Miguel	3,976	54.32%	3,343	45.68%	633	8.65%	7,319
Sandoval	1,520	55.78%	1,205	44.22%	315	11.56%	2,725
Santa Fe	4,927	46.53%	5,662	53.47%	-735	-6.94%	10,589
Sierra	909	46.98%	1,026	53.02%	-117	-6.05%	1,935
Socorro	1,672	45.86%	1,974	54.14%	-302	-8.28%	3,646
Taos	2,562	50.89%	2,472	49.11%	90	1.79%	5,034
Torrance	1,110	48.37%	1,185	51.63%	-75	-3.27%	2,295
Union	1,157	53.64%	1,000	46.36%	157	7.28%	2,157
Valencia	2,518	49.55%	2,564	50.45%	-46	-0.91%	5,082
Total	70,055	52.82%	62,575	47.18%	7,480	5.64%	132,630

==== Counties that flipped from Republican to Democratic ====
- Catron
- Harding
- Sandoval
- Taos
- Union
