= Katherine Burns Mabry =

American lawyer

Katherine Burns Mabry (1886–1958) was one of New Mexico’s first female lawyers and the First Lady of New Mexico from 1947 to 1951.

Mabry was born on August 10, 1886, in Kansas to Enoch M. Burns and Sarah Emily Powell. She was the second wife of State Senator Thomas J. Mabry, and received her law degree from Columbia University in New York. In 1917, she became the first female admitted to practice law in New Mexico. She thereafter practiced law in the office of her husband, who was also an attorney. She died on September 9, 1958, in New Mexico.

== See also ==
- List of first women lawyers and judges in New Mexico
