= 1948 New Mexico gubernatorial election =

- November 2, 1948
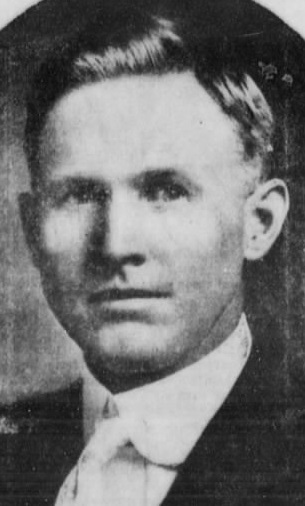

Nominee	Thomas J. Mabry	Manuel Lujan Sr.
Party	Democratic	Republican
Popular vote	103,969	86,023
Percentage	54.72%	45.28%
- County results Mabry: 50–60% 60–70% 70–80% 80–90% Lujan: 50–60% 60–70%
Governor before election
Thomas J. Mabry
Democratic
Elected Governor
Thomas J. Mabry
Democratic

The 1948 New Mexico gubernatorial election took place on November 2, 1948, in order to elect the Governor of New Mexico. Incumbent Democrat Thomas J. Mabry won reelection to a second term, defeating Manuel Lujan Sr., mayor of Santa Fe.

== Primary election ==
=== Democratic primary ===
1948 Democratic primary election
Party	Candidate	Votes	%
Democratic	Thomas J. Mabry (incumbent)	41,991	59.42%
Democratic	Eugene Allison	16,201	22.92%
Democratic	Ralph Gallegos	12,478	17.66%
Total votes		70,670	100.00%

=== Republican primary ===
1948 Republican primary election
Party	Candidate	Votes	%
Republican	Manuel Lujan Sr.	13,302	54.64%
Republican	Philip Hubbell	8,098	33.26%
Republican	Ernest W. Everly	2,296	9.43%
Republican	Bosco Powers	649	2.67%
Total votes		24,345	100.00%

== General election ==
=== Results ===
1948 New Mexico gubernatorial election
Party	Candidate	Votes	%	±%
Democratic	Thomas J. Mabry (incumbent)	103,969	54.72%	+1.90%
Republican	Manuel Lujan Sr.	86,023	45.28%	−1.90%
Majority		17,946	9.45%	
Total votes		189,992	100.00%	
Democratic hold		Swing	+3.81%	

=== Results by county ===
County	Thomas J. Mabry Democratic		Manuel Lujan Republican		Margin		Total votes cast
County	#	%	#	%	#	%	Total votes cast
Bernalillo	17,566	48.69%	18,509	51.31%	-943	-2.61%	36,075
Catron	673	56.75%	513	43.25%	160	13.49%	1,186
Chaves	5,040	63.87%	2,851	36.13%	2,189	27.74%	7,891
Colfax	3,485	52.30%	3,178	47.70%	307	4.61%	6,663
Curry	6,303	77.84%	1,794	22.16%	4,509	55.69%	8,097
De Baca	690	59.13%	477	40.87%	213	18.25%	1,167
Doña Ana	4,902	56.42%	3,787	43.58%	1,115	12.83%	8,689
Eddy	8,185	80.54%	1,978	19.46%	6,207	61.07%	10,163
Grant	4,042	69.06%	1,811	30.94%	2,231	38.12%	5,853
Guadalupe	1,401	44.96%	1,715	55.04%	-314	-10.08%	3,116
Harding	629	47.33%	700	52.67%	-71	-5.34%	1,329
Hidalgo	977	77.23%	288	22.77%	689	54.47%	1,265
Lea	4,849	80.04%	1,209	19.96%	3,640	60.09%	6,058
Lincoln	1,426	46.21%	1,660	53.79%	-234	-7.58%	3,086
Luna	1,628	62.52%	976	37.48%	652	25.04%	2,604
McKinley	3,067	59.39%	2,097	40.61%	970	18.78%	5,164
Mora	1,309	37.91%	2,144	62.09%	-835	-24.18%	3,453
Otero	2,229	58.38%	1,589	41.62%	640	16.76%	3,818
Quay	3,140	68.87%	1,419	31.13%	1,721	37.75%	4,559
Rio Arriba	3,901	42.79%	5,216	57.21%	-1,315	-14.42%	9,117
Roosevelt	3,445	81.73%	770	18.27%	2,675	63.46%	4,215
San Juan	1,773	43.56%	2,297	56.44%	-524	-12.87%	4,070
San Miguel	4,365	44.73%	5,394	55.27%	-1,029	-10.54%	9,759
Sandoval	1,703	47.28%	1,899	52.72%	-196	-5.44%	3,602
Santa Fe	5,769	41.86%	8,012	58.14%	-2,243	-16.28%	13,781
Sierra	1,515	53.88%	1,297	46.12%	218	7.75%	2,812
Socorro	1,570	40.82%	2,276	59.18%	-706	-18.36%	3,846
Taos	2,349	40.03%	3,519	59.97%	-1,170	-19.94%	5,868
Torrance	1,708	49.48%	1,744	50.52%	-36	-1.04%	3,452
Union	1,774	60.82%	1,143	39.18%	631	21.63%	2,917
Valencia	2,556	40.46%	3,761	59.54%	-1,205	-19.08%	6,317
Total	103,969	54.72%	86,023	45.28%	17,946	9.45%	189,992

==== Counties that flipped from Republican to Democratic ====
- Sierra

==== Counties that flipped from Democratic to Republican ====
- Harding
- Rio Arriba
- San Miguel
- Sandoval
- Taos
