= Thomas J. Mabry =

American judge (1884–1962)

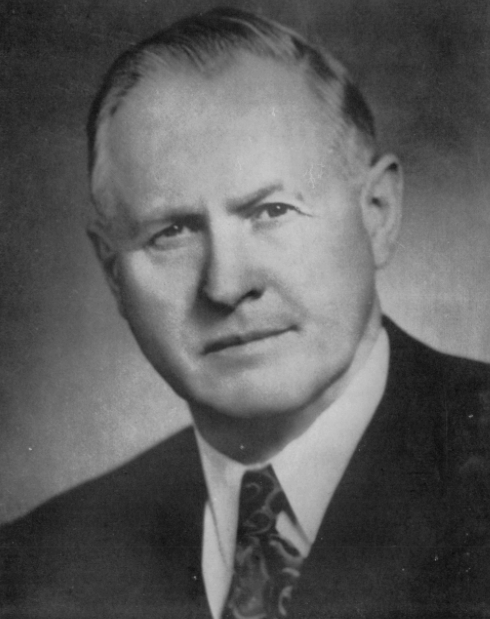

14th Governor of New Mexico
- In office January 1, 1947 – January 1, 1951
- Lieutenant: Joseph Montoya
- Preceded by: John J. Dempsey
- Succeeded by: Edwin L. Mechem

Personal details
- Born: Thomas Jewett Mabry; October 17, 1884 Carlisle County, Kentucky, U.S.
- Died: December 23, 1962 (aged 78) San Francisco, California, U.S.
- Party: Democratic
- Spouse(s): (married three times) Winifred White, Katherine Burns, Clara A. Berchtold
- Profession: Attorney
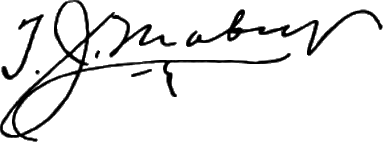
- Signature

Thomas Jewett Mabry (October 17, 1884 – December 23, 1962) was an American attorney, politician and judge, who was chief justice of the New Mexico Supreme Court (1939–46) and the 14th governor of New Mexico, from 1947 to 1951.

== Career ==
Thomas J. Mabry was born on October 17, 1884. He attended the University of Oklahoma and the University of New Mexico School of Law. He settled in Clovis, New Mexico, where he practiced law and published the local newspaper. He was a member of the New Mexico Constitutional Convention in 1910.

Mabry held numerous political and judicial posts, including serving in the New Mexico Senate (1912–17); on the Albuquerque City Commission (1926–27); as District Attorney of Albuquerque (1932–36); and as a state district judge (1937–39). From 1939 to 1946, he was chief justice of the New Mexico Supreme Court. He was elected Governor as a Democrat in 1946 and reelected in 1948. In 1917, during his time at the New Mexico Senate, his second wife Katherine Mabry became one of the first female lawyers in New Mexico.

During Mabry's time as governor, the state was active in several post-World War II initiatives, including creation of state commission on alcoholism and a fair employment practice commission.

Mabry's governorship was notable for his involvement in the "Brushy" Bill Roberts hearing. "Brushy" Bill Roberts claimed to be the outlaw William H. Bonney, a.k.a. Billy the Kid, and applied for a pardon from crimes Bonney had committed in New Mexico. Mabry announced the meeting, which was covered by the press. Mabry announced that he did not believe Roberts' story, and denied the pardon application. The press attention and the trip from his home in Hico, Texas to Santa Fe had a negative effect on the elderly Roberts' health, and he died soon afterwards.

In retirement, Mabry was a resident of Albuquerque. He died in San Francisco on December 23, 1962, and was buried at Fairview Memorial Park in Albuquerque.

Legal offices
Preceded by Andrew H. Hudspeth	Justice of the New Mexico Supreme Court; 1938–1946	Succeeded by Andrew H. Hudspeth
Party political offices
Preceded by John J. Dempsey	Democratic nominee for Governor of New Mexico; 1946, 1948	Succeeded by John E. Miles
Political offices
Preceded by John J. Dempsey	Governor of New Mexico; 1947–1951	Succeeded by Edwin L. Mechem
