= Fallstreak hole =

Large gap in cirrocumulus or altocumulus clouds

Fallstreak hole (Cavum)
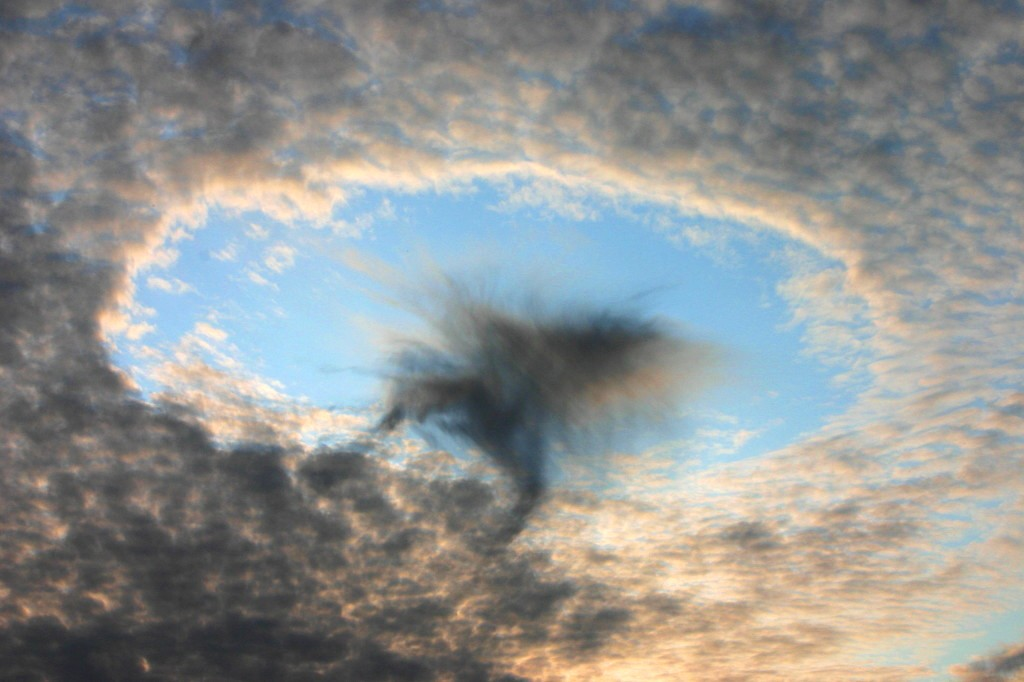
- Fallstreak hole over Austria
- Abbreviation: cav
- Genus: Cirrocumulus, altocumulus, stratocumulus
- Variety: Supplementary feature
- Altitude: 500–15,000 m (2,000–49,000 ft)
- Appearance: Hole in the clouds
- Precipitation: Virga

A fallstreak hole – also known as a cavum, hole punch cloud, punch hole cloud, skypunch, cloud canal, or cloud hole – is a large gap, usually circular or elliptical, that can appear in cirrocumulus or altocumulus clouds. The holes are caused by supercooled water in the clouds suddenly evaporating or freezing, and can be triggered by passing aircraft. Such clouds are not unique to any one geographic area and have been photographed from many places.

Due to their rarity and unusual appearance, fallstreak holes have been mistaken for or attributed to unidentified flying objects.

== Origin ==
Such holes are formed when the water temperature in the clouds is below freezing, but the water, in a supercooled state, has not frozen yet due to the lack of ice nucleation. When ice crystals do form, a domino effect is set off due to the Wegener-Bergeron-Findeisen process, causing the water droplets around the crystals to evaporate; this leaves a large, often circular, hole in the cloud. It is thought that the introduction of large numbers of tiny ice crystals into the cloud layer sets off this domino effect of fusion which creates the hole.

The ice crystals can be formed by passing aircraft, which often have a large reduction in pressure behind the wing-tip or propeller-tips. This cools the air very quickly, and can produce a ribbon of ice crystals trailing in the aircraft's wake. These ice crystals find themselves surrounded by droplets, and grow quickly by the Bergeron process, causing the droplets to evaporate and creating a hole with brush-like streaks of ice crystals below it. An early satellite documentation of elongated fallstreak holes over the Florida Panhandle that likely were induced by passing aircraft appeared in Corfidi and Brandli (1986). Fallstreak holes are more routinely seen by the higher resolution satellites of today.

Westbrook and Davies (2010) and Heymsfield et al. (2010) explain the processes behind the formation of fallstreak holes in greater detail, and show some observations of their microphysics and dynamics.

== Examples ==
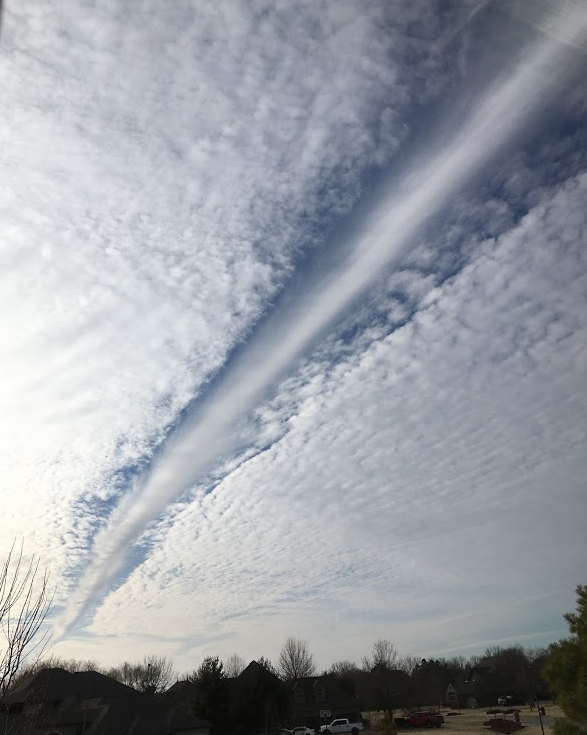
Elongated fallstreak hole over Bixby, United States

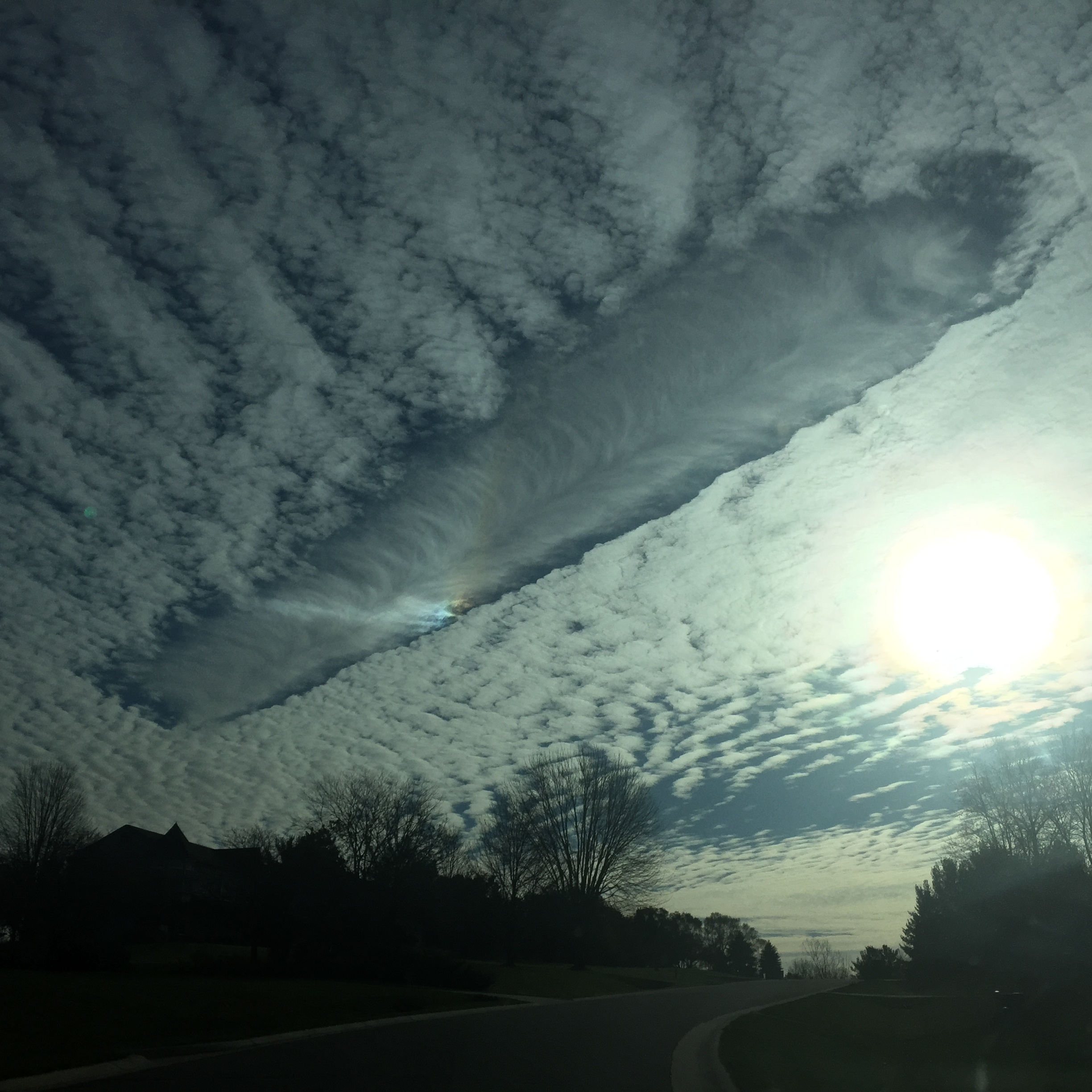
Fallstreak hole over Ann Arbor, United States

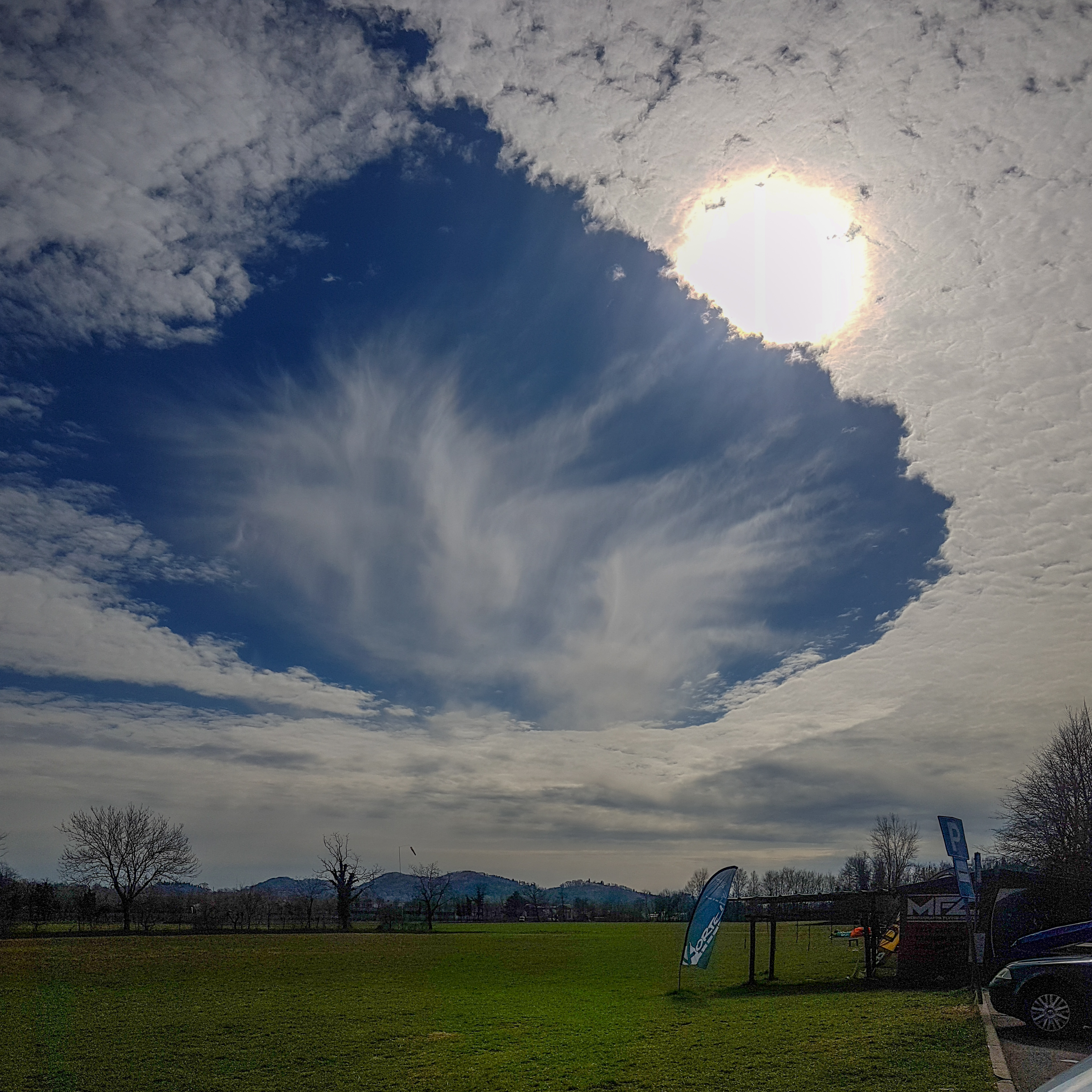
A fallstreak hole over Borso del Grappa, Italy

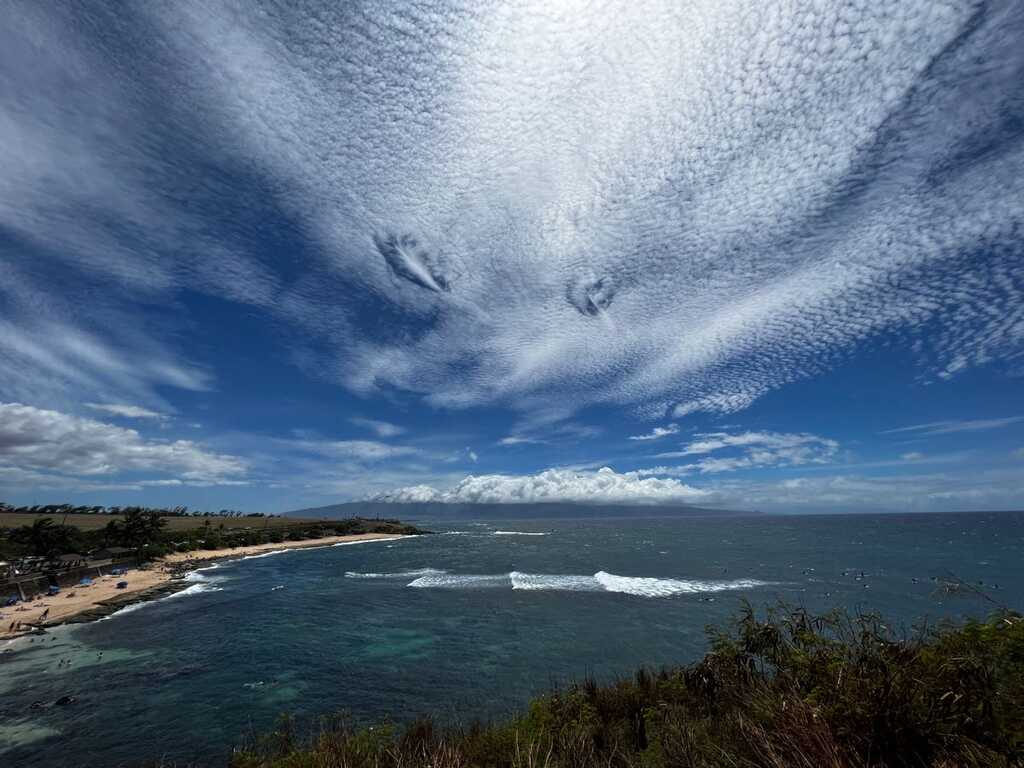
Fallstreak Holes over Hoʻokipa beach on Maui, Hawaii, United States

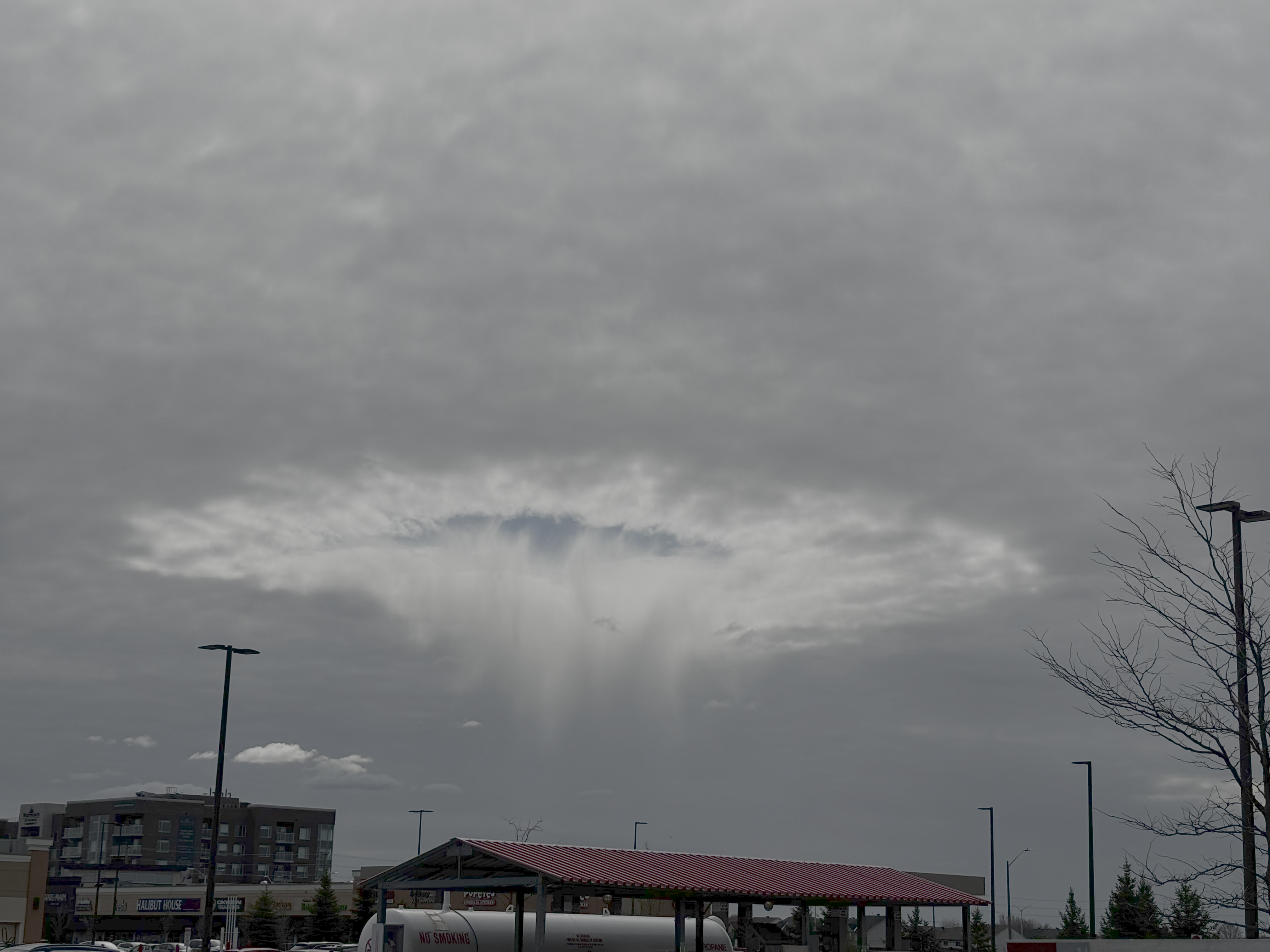
A fallstreak hole observed over Ottawa, Canada on May 8, 2026.

A fallstreak hole observed over Plymouth, Massachusetts in 2019.

== See also ==
- Circumhorizontal arc
- Cloud iridescence
- Distrails
- List of cloud types
- Virga
