= Contrail =

Long, thin artificial clouds that sometimes form behind aircraft

Contrails
- A jet forming contrails in a blue sky
- Genus: Cirrus (curl of hair), cirrocumulus, or cirrostratus
- Altitude: 7,500 to 12,000 m (25,000 to 40,000 ft)
- Classification: Family A (High-level)
- Appearance: Long bands
- Precipitation: No

Contrails (/ˈkɒntreɪlz/; short for "condensation trails") or vapour trails are line-shaped clouds produced by aircraft engine exhaust or changes in air pressure, typically at aircraft cruising altitudes several kilometres/miles above the Earth's surface. They are composed primarily of water, in the form of ice crystals. The combination of water vapor in aircraft engine exhaust and the low ambient temperatures at high altitudes cause the trails' formation.

Impurities in the engine exhaust from the fuel, including soot and sulfur compounds (0.05% by weight in jet fuel) provide some of the particles that serve as cloud condensation nuclei for water droplet growth in the exhaust. If water droplets form, they can freeze to form ice particles that compose a contrail. Their formation can also be triggered by changes in air pressure in wingtip vortices, or in the air over the entire wing surface. Contrails, and other clouds caused directly by human activity, are called homogenitus.

The vapor trails produced by rockets are referred to as "missile contrails" or "rocket contrails." The water vapor and aerosol produced by rockets promote the "formation of ice clouds in ice supersaturated layers of the atmosphere." Missile contrail clouds mainly comprise "metal oxide particles, high-temperature water vapor condensation particles, and other byproducts of engine combustion."

Depending on the temperature and humidity at the altitude where the contrails form, they may be visible for only a few seconds or minutes, or may persist for hours and spread to be several kilometres/miles wide, eventually resembling natural cirrus or altocumulus clouds. Persistent contrails are of particular interest to scientists because they increase the cloudiness of the atmosphere. The resulting cloud forms are formally described as homomutatus, and may resemble cirrus, cirrocumulus, or cirrostratus, and are sometimes called cirrus aviaticus. Some persistent spreading contrails contribute to climate change.

== Condensation trails as a result of engine exhaust ==
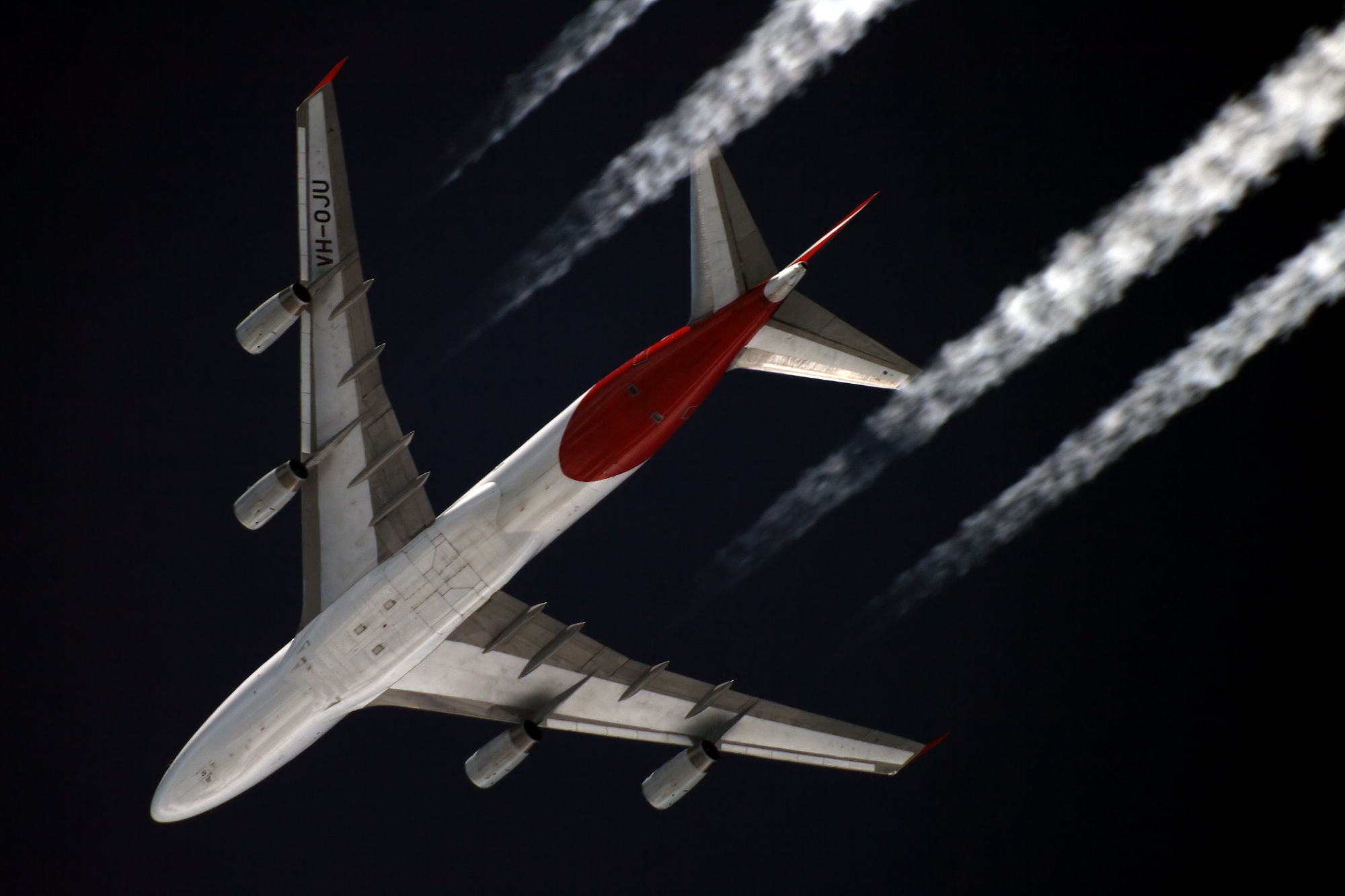
Contrails of a Boeing 747-438 from Qantas at 11,000 m (36,000 ft)

Engine exhaust is predominantly made up of water and carbon dioxide, the combustion products of hydrocarbon fuels. Many other chemical byproducts of incomplete hydrocarbon fuel combustion, including volatile organic compounds, inorganic gases, polycyclic aromatic hydrocarbons, oxygenated organics, alcohols, ozone and particles of soot have been observed at lower concentrations. The exact quality is a function of engine type and basic combustion engine function. At high altitudes as this water vapor emerges into a cold environment, the localized increase in water vapor can raise the relative humidity of the air past saturation point. The vapor then condenses into tiny water droplets which freeze if the temperature is low enough. These millions of tiny water droplets and/or ice crystals form the contrails. The time taken for the vapor to cool enough to condense accounts for the contrail forming some distance behind the aircraft. At high altitudes, supercooled water vapor requires a trigger to encourage deposition or condensation. The exhaust particles in the aircraft's exhaust act as this trigger, causing the trapped vapor to condense rapidly. Exhaust contrails usually form at high altitudes; usually above 8,000 m (26,000 ft), where the air temperature is below −36.5 °C (−34 °F). They can also form closer to the ground when the air is cold and moist.

== Condensation from decreases in pressure ==
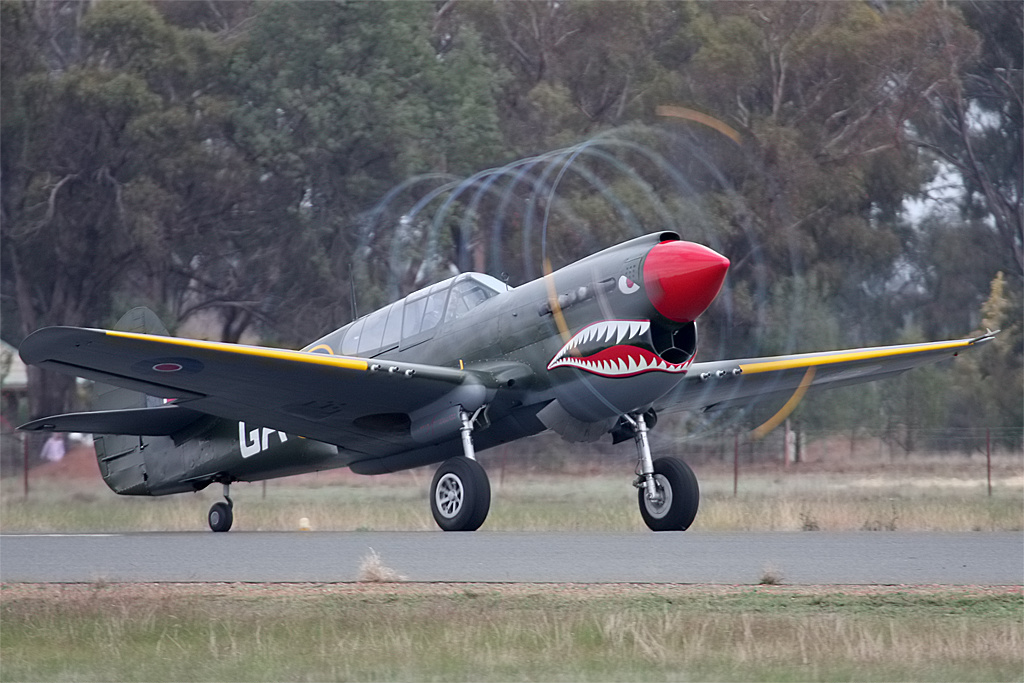
A vintage P-40 Warhawk with propeller tip vortex condensation

The tips of rotating surfaces (such as propellers and rotors) sometimes produce visible contrails.

In firearms, a vapor trail is sometimes observed when firing under rare conditions, due to condensation induced by changes in air pressure around the bullet. A vapor trail from a bullet is observable from any direction. Vapor trail should not be confused with bullet trace, a refractive effect due to changes in air pressure as the bullet travels, which is a much more common phenomenon (and is usually only observable directly from behind the shooter).

== Impacts on climate ==
Contrails' contribution to climate change might be similar to CO_{2} emissions from aviation, but this depends on the time horizon chosen. In general, aircraft contrails trap outgoing longwave radiation emitted by the Earth and atmosphere more than they reflect incoming solar radiation, resulting in a net increase in radiative forcing of around 0.03–0.06 watts per square meter (W/m²). Contrail effects differ a lot depending on when they are formed, as they decrease the daytime temperature and increase the nighttime temperature, reducing their difference. Most of the contrail heating is over Europe, North America, and the North Atlantic, whereas flights in other regions such as East Asia are often through warmer air so less likely to form contrails.

The effect of COVID-19 reductions in flight traffic decreased contrails. The unique timing of such reductions, which were maximum in Northern Hemisphere summer, when the largest contrail cooling occurs, means that warming reductions due to fewer contrails in the spring and fall were offset by cooling reductions due to fewer contrails in summer, giving no significant annual averaged effective radiative forcing (ERF) from contrail changes in 2020. Despite no net significant global ERF, there are some land regions that cooled significantly and up to −0.2 K from what would have been expected with baseline aviation contrails. These reductions occurred in the same regions as large contrail temperature changes in the subtropical Northern Hemisphere.

Despite the extra fuel required it is thought that rerouting (probably a slight height change) a small proportion of flights would significantly reduce overall heating, and cleaner fuels (such as sustainable aviation fuel) and newer engines might also help. Further research may be needed, such as how to estimate the systematic effects of rerouting and how much air traffic controllers' workload would increase. Projects include ContrailNet from Eurocontrol, Reviate, and the Ciconia project, as well as Google's 'project contrails'. Others such as Satavia, which is part of GE, say that atmospheric regions at risk of contrails are known well enough already, and that it could be done now very cheaply, simply by modifying flight plans.

Since 2025 the EU has required the warming from contrails to be monitored. European efforts to 2027 are coordinated by the Aviation Non-CO_{2} Expert Network, but in 2025 the National Academies of Sciences, Engineering, and Medicine criticised research in the US as "fragmented". As of 2025 most contrails cannot be seen by geostationary satellites, but they can be complemented with sun synchronous satellites and ground observations. Satellite and ground based lidar can also help detect contrails, and visible ground observation can help show which flight created a contrail.

In November 2025 a joint study of several German research institutes showed that the climate impacts of contrails cannot yet be sufficiently estimated to justify strategies of rerouting flights.

== Head-on contrails ==
A contrail from an airplane flying towards the observer can appear to be generated by an object moving vertically. On 8 November 2010 in the US state of California, a contrail of this type gained media attention as a "mystery missile" that could not be explained by US military and aviation authorities, and its explanation as a contrail took more than 24 hours to become accepted by US media and military institutions.

== Distrails ==
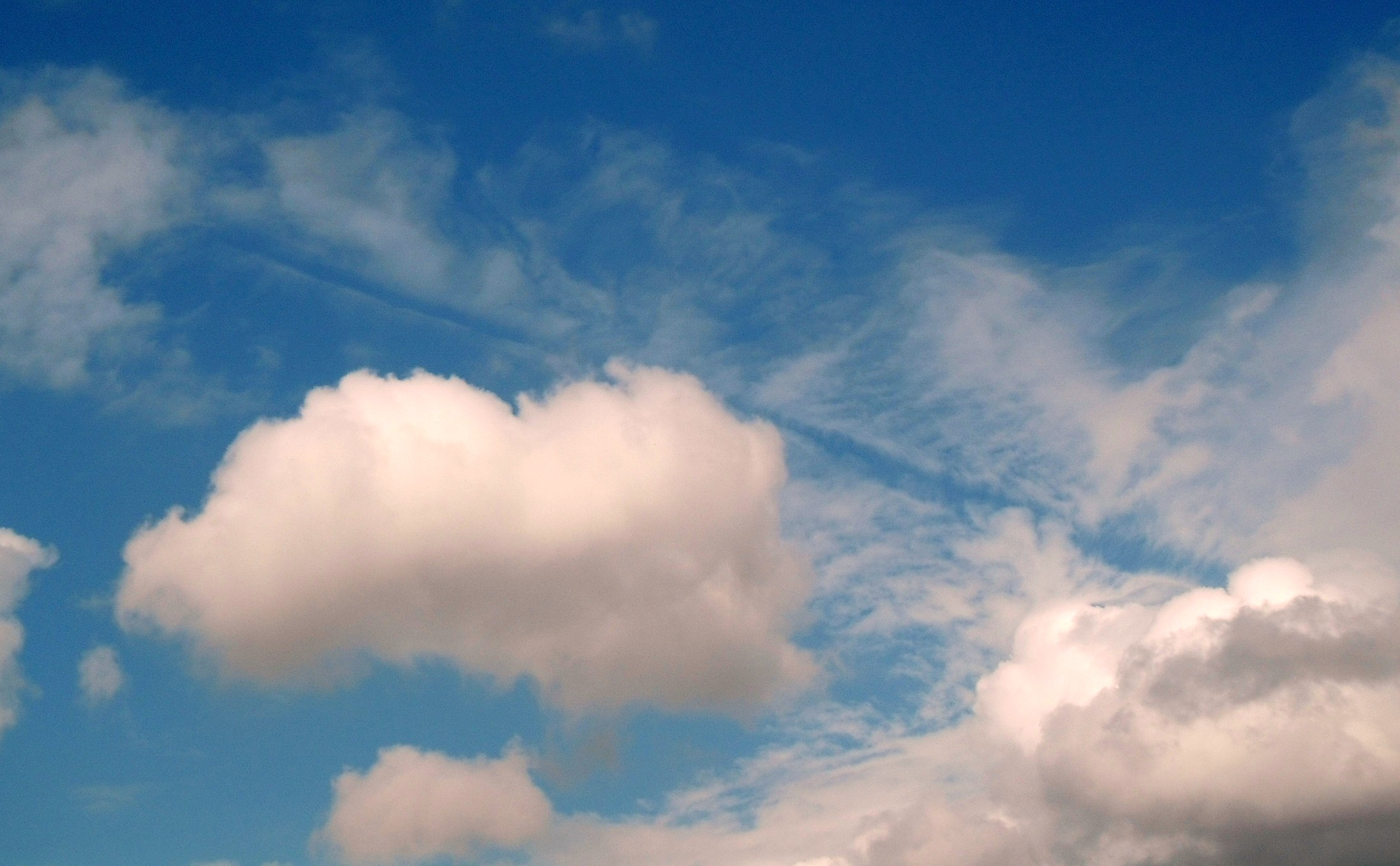
A distrail is the opposite of a contrail

Where an aircraft passes through a cloud, it can disperse the cloud in its path. This is known as a distrail (short for "dissipation trail"). The plane's warm engine exhaust and enhanced vertical mixing in the aircraft's wake can cause existing cloud droplets to evaporate. If the cloud is sufficiently thin, such processes can yield a cloud-free corridor in an otherwise solid cloud layer. An early satellite observation of distrails that most likely were elongated, aircraft-induced fallstreak holes appeared in Corfidi and Brandli (1986).

Clouds form when invisible water vapor condenses into microscopic water droplets or into microscopic ice crystals. This may happen when air with a high proportion of gaseous water cools. A distrail forms when the heat of engine exhaust evaporates the liquid water droplets in a cloud, turning them back into invisible, gaseous water vapor. Distrails also may arise as a result of enhanced mixing (entrainment) of drier air immediately above or below a thin cloud layer following passage of an aircraft through the cloud, as shown in the second image below:

== See also ==
- Chemtrail conspiracy theory
- Cloud chamber – particle detector that works on similar principle
- Fallstreak hole
- Ship tracks
- Skywriting
- Space jellyfish
- Twomey effect
