= New Mexico's congressional delegations =

New Mexico's congressional districts since 2023

These are tables of congressional delegations from New Mexico to the United States House of Representatives and the United States Senate.

The deans of the New Mexico delegation are Senators Martin Heinrich and Ben Ray Luján, both having served in Congress since January 3, 2009. Heinrich has served in the Senate since 2013 and Luján since 2021. Both previously served in the House representing the 1st and 3rd districts respectively.

== Current delegation ==
Current U.S. senators from New Mexico
New Mexico CPVI (2025): D+4	Class I senator	Class II senator
New Mexico CPVI (2025): D+4	Martin Heinrich (Senior senator) (Albuquerque)	Ben Ray Luján (Junior senator) (Nambé)
Party	Democratic	Democratic
Incumbent since	January 3, 2013	January 3, 2021

Current U.S. representatives from New Mexico
District	Member (Residence)	Party	Incumbent since	CPVI (2025)	District map
1st	Melanie Stansbury (Albuquerque)	Democratic	June 14, 2021	D+7	
2nd	Gabe Vasquez (Las Cruces)	Democratic	January 3, 2023	EVEN	
3rd	Teresa Leger Fernandez (Santa Fe)	Democratic	January 3, 2021	D+3	

== United States Senate ==
Democratic (D)
Republican (R)

Senators from New Mexico
Class I senator	Congress	Class II senator
Thomas B. Catron (R)	62nd (1911–1913)	Albert B. Fall (R) (Note: Senator Fall resigned on March 4, 1921, to become the Secretary of the Interior in the Warren G. Harding administration.)
Thomas B. Catron (R)	63rd (1913–1915)	Albert B. Fall (R)
Thomas B. Catron (R)	64th (1915–1917)	Albert B. Fall (R)
Andrieus A. Jones (D) (Note: Senator Jones died on December 20, 1927, while in office.)	65th (1917–1919)	Albert B. Fall (R)
Andrieus A. Jones (D)	66th (1919–1921)	Albert B. Fall (R)
Andrieus A. Jones (D)	67th (1921–1923)	Albert B. Fall (R)
Andrieus A. Jones (D)	67th (1921–1923)	Holm O. Bursum (R)
Andrieus A. Jones (D)	68th (1923–1925)	Holm O. Bursum (R)
Andrieus A. Jones (D)	69th (1925–1927)	Sam G. Bratton (D)
Andrieus A. Jones (D)	70th (1927–1929)	Sam G. Bratton (D)
Bronson M. Cutting (R)	70th (1927–1929)	Sam G. Bratton (D)
Octaviano Larrazolo (R)	70th (1927–1929)	Sam G. Bratton (D)
Bronson M. Cutting (R)	71st (1929–1931)	Sam G. Bratton (D)
Bronson M. Cutting (R)	72nd (1931–1933)	Sam G. Bratton (D)
Bronson M. Cutting (R)	73rd (1933–1935)	Sam G. Bratton (D)
Bronson M. Cutting (R)	73rd (1933–1935)	Carl Hatch (D)
Bronson M. Cutting (R)	74th (1935–1937)	Carl Hatch (D)
Dennis Chávez (D) (Note: Senator Chávez died on November 18, 1962, while in office.)	74th (1935–1937)	Carl Hatch (D)
Dennis Chávez (D)	75th (1937–1939)	Carl Hatch (D)
Dennis Chávez (D)	76th (1939–1941)	Carl Hatch (D)
Dennis Chávez (D)	77th (1941–1943)	Carl Hatch (D)
Dennis Chávez (D)	78th (1943–1945)	Carl Hatch (D)
Dennis Chávez (D)	79th (1945–1947)	Carl Hatch (D)
Dennis Chávez (D)	80th (1947–1949)	Carl Hatch (D)
Dennis Chávez (D)	81st (1949–1951)	Clinton Anderson (D)
Dennis Chávez (D)	82nd (1951–1953)	Clinton Anderson (D)
Dennis Chávez (D)	83rd (1953–1955)	Clinton Anderson (D)
Dennis Chávez (D)	84th (1955–1957)	Clinton Anderson (D)
Dennis Chávez (D)	85th (1957–1959)	Clinton Anderson (D)
Dennis Chávez (D)	86th (1959–1961)	Clinton Anderson (D)
Dennis Chávez (D)	87th (1961–1963)	Clinton Anderson (D)
Edwin L. Mechem (R)	87th (1961–1963)	Clinton Anderson (D)
Edwin L. Mechem (R)	88th (1963–1965)	Clinton Anderson (D)
Joseph Montoya (D)	88th (1963–1965)	Clinton Anderson (D)
Joseph Montoya (D)	89th (1965–1967)	Clinton Anderson (D)
Joseph Montoya (D)	90th (1967–1969)	Clinton Anderson (D)
Joseph Montoya (D)	91st (1969–1971)	Clinton Anderson (D)
Joseph Montoya (D)	92nd (1971–1973)	Clinton Anderson (D)
Joseph Montoya (D)	93rd (1973–1975)	Pete Domenici (R)
Joseph Montoya (D)	94th (1975–1977)	Pete Domenici (R)
Harrison Schmitt (R)	95th (1977–1979)	Pete Domenici (R)
Harrison Schmitt (R)	96th (1979–1981)	Pete Domenici (R)
Harrison Schmitt (R)	97th (1981–1983)	Pete Domenici (R)
Jeff Bingaman (D)	98th (1983–1985)	Pete Domenici (R)
Jeff Bingaman (D)	99th (1985–1987)	Pete Domenici (R)
Jeff Bingaman (D)	100th (1987–1989)	Pete Domenici (R)
Jeff Bingaman (D)	101st (1989–1991)	Pete Domenici (R)
Jeff Bingaman (D)	102nd (1991–1993)	Pete Domenici (R)
Jeff Bingaman (D)	103rd (1993–1995)	Pete Domenici (R)
Jeff Bingaman (D)	104th (1995–1997)	Pete Domenici (R)
Jeff Bingaman (D)	105th (1997–1999)	Pete Domenici (R)
Jeff Bingaman (D)	106th (1999–2001)	Pete Domenici (R)
Jeff Bingaman (D)	107th (2001–2003)	Pete Domenici (R)
Jeff Bingaman (D)	108th (2003–2005)	Pete Domenici (R)
Jeff Bingaman (D)	109th (2005–2007)	Pete Domenici (R)
Jeff Bingaman (D)	110th (2007–2009)	Pete Domenici (R)
Jeff Bingaman (D)	111th (2009–2011)	Tom Udall (D)
Jeff Bingaman (D)	112th (2011–2013)	Tom Udall (D)
Martin Heinrich (D)	113th (2013–2015)	Tom Udall (D)
Martin Heinrich (D)	114th (2015–2017)	Tom Udall (D)
Martin Heinrich (D)	115th (2017–2019)	Tom Udall (D)
Martin Heinrich (D)	116th (2019–2021)	Tom Udall (D)
Martin Heinrich (D)	117th (2021–2023)	Ben Ray Luján (D)
Martin Heinrich (D)	118th (2023–2025)	Ben Ray Luján (D)
Martin Heinrich (D)	119th (2025–2027)	Ben Ray Luján (D)
Martin Heinrich (D)	120th (2027–2029)	Ben Ray Luján (D)

== United States House of Representatives ==
=== Current members of the House ===
List of United States representatives, their terms in office, district boundaries, and the district political ratings according to the CPVI. The delegation has a total of 3 members, all 3 Democrats.

=== Historical representatives ===
Democratic (D)
Republican (R)

==== 1851-1913: 1 non-voting delegate ====
Beginning with the 32nd United States Congress, New Mexico Territory sent a delegate to the House.

Delegates to the House of Representatives from New Mexico Territory from 1851 to 1913
Congress	Delegate
32nd (1851–1853)	Richard Hanson Weightman (D)
33rd (1853–1855)	José Manuel Gallegos (D)
34th (1855–1857)	Miguel Antonio Otero (D)
35th (1857–1859)	Miguel Antonio Otero (D)
36th (1859–1861)	Miguel Antonio Otero (D)
37th (1861–1863)	John Sebrie Watts (R)
38th (1863–1865)	Francisco Perea (R)
39th (1865–1867)	José Francisco Chaves (R)
40th (1867–1869)	Charles P. Clever (D)
40th (1867–1869)	José Francisco Chaves (R)
41st (1869–1871)	José Francisco Chaves (R)
42nd (1871–1873)	José Manuel Gallegos (D)
43rd (1873–1875)	Stephen B. Elkins (R)
44th (1875–1877)	Stephen B. Elkins (R)
45th (1877–1879)	Trinidad Romero (R)
46th (1879–1881)	Mariano S. Otero (R)
47th (1881–1883)	Tranquilino Luna (R)
48th (1883–1885)	Tranquilino Luna (R)
48th (1883–1885)	Francisco Antonio Manzanares (D)
49th (1885–1887)	Antonio Joseph (D)
50th (1887–1889)	Antonio Joseph (D)
51st (1889–1891)	Antonio Joseph (D)
52nd (1891–1893)	Antonio Joseph (D)
53rd (1893–1895)	Antonio Joseph (D)
54th (1895–1897)	Thomas B. Catron (R)
55th (1897–1899)	Harvey Butler Fergusson (D)
56th (1899–1901)	Pedro Perea (R)
57th (1901–1903)	Bernard Shandon Rodey (R)
58th (1903–1905)	Bernard Shandon Rodey (R)
59th (1905–1907)	William Henry Andrews (R)
60th (1907–1909)	William Henry Andrews (R)
61st (1909–1911)	William Henry Andrews (R)
62nd (1911–1913)	William Henry Andrews (R)

==== Post-statehood ====
Congress	Members elected at-large statewide		
Congress	Seat A	Seat B	
62nd (1911–1913)	Harvey Butler; Fergusson (D)	George Curry (R)	
63rd (1913–1915)	Harvey Butler; Fergusson (D)	Seat abolished	
64th (1915–1917)	Benigno C. Hernández (R)	Seat abolished	
65th (1917–1919)	William B. Walton (D)	Seat abolished	
66th (1919–1921)	Benigno C. Hernández (R)	Seat abolished	
67th (1921–1923)	Néstor Montoya (R)	Seat abolished	
67th (1921–1923)	vacant (Note: New Mexico law prior to 1960 dictated that if a seat was vacated, the term would expire naturally without a special election. The law was changed due to the close proximity of Antonio M. Fernández and John J. Dempsey's deaths on November 7, 1956 and March 11, 1958 (respectively), leaving New Mexico with only one U.S. Representative for an extended time.)	Seat abolished	
68th (1923–1925)	John Morrow (D)	Seat abolished	
69th (1925–1927)	John Morrow (D)	Seat abolished	
70th (1927–1929)	John Morrow (D)	Seat abolished	
71st (1929–1931)	Albert G. Simms (R)	Seat abolished	
72nd (1931–1933)	Dennis Chávez (D)	Seat abolished	
73rd (1933–1935)	Dennis Chávez (D)	Seat abolished	
74th (1935–1937)	John J. Dempsey (D)	Seat abolished	
75th (1937–1939)	John J. Dempsey (D)	Seat abolished	
76th (1939–1941)	John J. Dempsey (D)	Seat abolished	
77th (1941–1943)	Clinton Anderson (D)	Seat abolished	
78th (1943–1945)	Clinton Anderson (D)	Antonio M. Fernández (D)	
79th (1945–1947)	Clinton Anderson (D)	Antonio M. Fernández (D)	
80th (1947–1949)	Georgia Lee Lusk (D)	Antonio M. Fernández (D)	
81st (1949–1951)	John E. Miles (D)	Antonio M. Fernández (D)	
82nd (1951–1953)	John J. Dempsey (D)	Antonio M. Fernández (D)	
83rd (1953–1955)	John J. Dempsey (D)	Antonio M. Fernández (D)	
84th (1955–1957)	John J. Dempsey (D)	Antonio M. Fernández (D)	
84th (1955–1957)	John J. Dempsey (D)	vacant	
85th (1957–1959)	John J. Dempsey (D)	Joseph Montoya (D)	
85th (1957–1959)	vacant	Joseph Montoya (D)	
86th (1959–1961)	Thomas G. Morris (D)	Joseph Montoya (D)	
87th (1961–1963)	Thomas G. Morris (D)	Joseph Montoya (D)	
88th (1963–1965)	Thomas G. Morris (D)	Joseph Montoya (D)	
89th (1965–1967)	Thomas G. Morris (D)	E. S. Johnny Walker (D)	
90th (1967–1969)	Thomas G. Morris (D)	E. S. Johnny Walker (D)	
Congress	1st district	2nd district	
91st (1969–1971)	Manuel Lujan Jr. (R)	Ed Foreman (R)	
92nd (1971–1973)	Manuel Lujan Jr. (R)	Harold L. Runnels (D)	
93rd (1973–1975)	Manuel Lujan Jr. (R)	Harold L. Runnels (D)	
94th (1975–1977)	Manuel Lujan Jr. (R)	Harold L. Runnels (D)	
95th (1977–1979)	Manuel Lujan Jr. (R)	Harold L. Runnels (D)	
96th (1979–1981)	Manuel Lujan Jr. (R)	Harold L. Runnels (D)	
97th (1981–1983)	Manuel Lujan Jr. (R)	Joe Skeen (R)	3rd district
98th (1983–1985)	Manuel Lujan Jr. (R)	Joe Skeen (R)	Bill Richardson (D)
99th (1985–1987)	Manuel Lujan Jr. (R)	Joe Skeen (R)	Bill Richardson (D)
100th (1987–1989)	Manuel Lujan Jr. (R)	Joe Skeen (R)	Bill Richardson (D)
101st (1989–1991)	Steven Schiff (R)	Joe Skeen (R)	Bill Richardson (D)
102nd (1991–1993)	Steven Schiff (R)	Joe Skeen (R)	Bill Richardson (D)
103rd (1993–1995)	Steven Schiff (R)	Joe Skeen (R)	Bill Richardson (D)
104th (1995–1997)	Steven Schiff (R)	Joe Skeen (R)	Bill Richardson (D)
105th (1997–1999)	Steven Schiff (R)	Joe Skeen (R)	Bill Richardson (D)
105th (1997–1999)	Heather Wilson (R)	Joe Skeen (R)	Bill Redmond (R)
106th (1999–2001)	Heather Wilson (R)	Joe Skeen (R)	Tom Udall (D)
107th (2001–2003)	Heather Wilson (R)	Joe Skeen (R)	Tom Udall (D)
108th (2003–2005)	Heather Wilson (R)	Steve Pearce (R)	Tom Udall (D)
109th (2005–2007)	Heather Wilson (R)	Steve Pearce (R)	Tom Udall (D)
110th (2007–2009)	Heather Wilson (R)	Steve Pearce (R)	Tom Udall (D)
111th (2009–2011)	Martin Heinrich (D)	Harry Teague (D)	Ben Ray Luján (D)
112th (2011–2013)	Martin Heinrich (D)	Steve Pearce (R)	Ben Ray Luján (D)
113th (2013–2015)	Michelle Lujan Grisham (D)	Steve Pearce (R)	Ben Ray Luján (D)
114th (2015–2017)	Michelle Lujan Grisham (D)	Steve Pearce (R)	Ben Ray Luján (D)
115th (2017–2019)	Michelle Lujan Grisham (D)	Steve Pearce (R)	Ben Ray Luján (D)
116th (2019–2021)	Deb Haaland (D)	Xochitl Torres Small (D)	Ben Ray Luján (D)
117th (2021–2023)	Deb Haaland (D)	Yvette Herrell (R)	Teresa Leger; Fernández (D)
117th (2021–2023)	Melanie Stansbury (D)	Yvette Herrell (R)	Teresa Leger; Fernández (D)
118th (2023–2025)	Melanie Stansbury (D)	Gabe Vasquez (D)	Teresa Leger; Fernández (D)
119th (2025–2027)	Melanie Stansbury (D)	Gabe Vasquez (D)	Teresa Leger; Fernández (D)
120th (2027–2029)	Melanie Stansbury (D)	Gabe Vasquez (D)	Teresa Leger; Fernández (D)

== See also ==
- List of United States congressional districts
- New Mexico's congressional districts
- Political party strength in New Mexico
