= New Mexico's at-large congressional district =

- Obsolete district
- Created: 1912
- Eliminated: 1969
- Years active: 1912–1969

From statehood in 1912 to 1969, New Mexico did not use congressional districts for its representatives to the United States House of Representatives. Instead, it elected its representatives statewide at-large.

== List of members representing the district ==
Years	Cong ress	Seat A			Seat B		
Years	Cong ress	Member	Party	Electoral history	Member	Party	Electoral history
January 8, 1912 – March 3, 1913	62nd	Harvey Fergusson (Albuquerque)	Democratic	Elected in 1911 for the term starting upon 1912 statehood. Re-elected in 1912. Lost re-election.	George Curry (Tularosa)	Republican	Elected in 1911 for the term starting upon 1912 statehood. Retired.
March 3, 1913 – March 3, 1915	63rd	Harvey Fergusson (Albuquerque)	Democratic	Elected in 1911 for the term starting upon 1912 statehood. Re-elected in 1912. Lost re-election.	No second seat until 1943		
March 4, 1915 – March 3, 1917	64th	Benigno C. Hernández (Tierra Amarilla)	Republican	Elected in 1914. Lost re-election.	No second seat until 1943		
March 4, 1917 – March 3, 1919	65th	William B. Walton (Silver City)	Democratic	Elected in 1916. Retired to run for U.S. senator.	No second seat until 1943		
March 4, 1919 – March 3, 1921	66th	Benigno C. Hernández (Tierra Amarilla)	Republican	Elected in 1918. Retired.	No second seat until 1943		
March 4, 1921 – January 13, 1923	67th	Néstor Montoya (Albuquerque)	Republican	Elected in 1920. Retired but died before term expired.	No second seat until 1943		
January 13, 1923 – March 3, 1923	67th	Vacant			No second seat until 1943		
March 4, 1923 – March 3, 1929	68th 69th 70th	John Morrow (Raton)	Democratic	Elected in 1922. Re-elected in 1924. Re-elected in 1926. Lost re-election.	No second seat until 1943		
March 4, 1929 – March 3, 1931	71st	Albert G. Simms (Albuquerque)	Republican	Elected in 1928. Lost re-election.	No second seat until 1943		
March 4, 1931 – January 3, 1935	72nd 73rd	Dennis Chavez (Albuquerque)	Democratic	Elected in 1930. Re-elected in 1932. Retired to run for U.S. senator.	No second seat until 1943		
January 3, 1935 – January 3, 1941	74th 75th 76th	John J. Dempsey (Santa Fe)	Democratic	Elected in 1934. Re-elected in 1936. Re-elected in 1938. Retired to run for U.S. senator.	No second seat until 1943		
January 3, 1941 – January 3, 1943	77th	Clinton P. Anderson (Albuquerque)	Democratic	Elected in 1940. Re-elected in 1942. Re-elected in 1944. Resigned to become U.S. Secretary of Agriculture.	No second seat until 1943		
January 3, 1943 – June 30, 1945	78th 79th	Clinton P. Anderson (Albuquerque)	Democratic	Elected in 1940. Re-elected in 1942. Re-elected in 1944. Resigned to become U.S. Secretary of Agriculture.	Antonio M. Fernández (Santa Fe)	Democratic	Re-elected in 1942. Re-elected in 1944. Re-elected in 1946. Re-elected in 1948. Re-elected in 1950. Re-elected in 1952. Re-elected in 1954. Re-elected in 1956. Died.
June 30, 1945 – January 3, 1947	79th	Vacant			Antonio M. Fernández (Santa Fe)	Democratic	Re-elected in 1942. Re-elected in 1944. Re-elected in 1946. Re-elected in 1948. Re-elected in 1950. Re-elected in 1952. Re-elected in 1954. Re-elected in 1956. Died.
January 3, 1947 – January 3, 1949	80th	Georgia Lee Lusk (Santa Fe)	Democratic	Elected in 1946. Lost renomination.	Antonio M. Fernández (Santa Fe)	Democratic	Re-elected in 1942. Re-elected in 1944. Re-elected in 1946. Re-elected in 1948. Re-elected in 1950. Re-elected in 1952. Re-elected in 1954. Re-elected in 1956. Died.
January 3, 1949 – January 3, 1951	81st	John E. Miles (Santa Fe)	Democratic	Elected in 1948. Retired.	Antonio M. Fernández (Santa Fe)	Democratic	Re-elected in 1942. Re-elected in 1944. Re-elected in 1946. Re-elected in 1948. Re-elected in 1950. Re-elected in 1952. Re-elected in 1954. Re-elected in 1956. Died.
January 3, 1951 – November 7, 1956	82nd 83rd 84th	John J. Dempsey (Santa Fe)	Democratic	Re-elected in 1950. Re-elected in 1952. Re-elected in 1954. Re-elected in 1956. Died.	Antonio M. Fernández (Santa Fe)	Democratic	Re-elected in 1942. Re-elected in 1944. Re-elected in 1946. Re-elected in 1948. Re-elected in 1950. Re-elected in 1952. Re-elected in 1954. Re-elected in 1956. Died.
November 7, 1956 – April 9, 1957	84th 85th	John J. Dempsey (Santa Fe)	Democratic	Re-elected in 1950. Re-elected in 1952. Re-elected in 1954. Re-elected in 1956. Died.	Vacant		
April 9, 1957 – March 11, 1958	85th	John J. Dempsey (Santa Fe)	Democratic	Re-elected in 1950. Re-elected in 1952. Re-elected in 1954. Re-elected in 1956. Died.	Joseph Montoya (Santa Fe)	Democratic	Elected to finish Fernández's term. Re-elected in 1958. Re-elected in 1960. Re-elected in 1962. Retired to run for U.S. senator. Resigned when elected U.S. Senator.
March 12, 1958 – January 3, 1959	85th	Vacant			Joseph Montoya (Santa Fe)	Democratic	Elected to finish Fernández's term. Re-elected in 1958. Re-elected in 1960. Re-elected in 1962. Retired to run for U.S. senator. Resigned when elected U.S. Senator.
January 3, 1959 – November 3, 1964	86th 87th 88th	Thomas G. Morris (Tucumcari)	Democratic	Elected in 1958. Re-elected in 1960. Re-elected in 1962. Re-elected in 1964. Re-elected in 1966. Redistricted to the 1st district and lost re-election.	Joseph Montoya (Santa Fe)	Democratic	Elected to finish Fernández's term. Re-elected in 1958. Re-elected in 1960. Re-elected in 1962. Retired to run for U.S. senator. Resigned when elected U.S. Senator.
November 3, 1964 – January 3, 1965	88th	Thomas G. Morris (Tucumcari)	Democratic	Elected in 1958. Re-elected in 1960. Re-elected in 1962. Re-elected in 1964. Re-elected in 1966. Redistricted to the 1st district and lost re-election.	Vacant		
January 3, 1965 – January 3, 1969	89th 90th	Thomas G. Morris (Tucumcari)	Democratic	Elected in 1958. Re-elected in 1960. Re-elected in 1962. Re-elected in 1964. Re-elected in 1966. Redistricted to the 1st district and lost re-election.	E. S. Johnny Walker (Santa Fe)	Democratic	Elected in 1964. Re-elected in 1966. Redistricted to the 2nd district and lost re-election.

== Elections ==
Republicans held onto the seat in 1920 by nominating Néstor Montoya, the county clerk of Bernalillo County and former Speaker of the New Mexico Territorial Legislature. Montoya won with a combination of Hispanic voters and coat-tails from the election of President Warren Harding. Republicans did not renominate him in 1922, choosing instead suffragist Adelina Otero-Warren, the niece of former territorial Governor, Miguel Otero, and the first woman to run for statewide office in New Mexico. Otero-Warren was defeated by Democrat John Morrow, an educator and lawyer from northeast New Mexico. Morrow would win consecutive re-elections in 1924 and 1926, but lost re-election in 1928 to Albert G. Simms, an Albuquerque businessman, on the coat-tails of the election of President Herbert Hoover.

1920 United States House of Representatives election in New Mexico
Party	Candidate	Votes	%
Republican	Néstor Montoya	54,672	51.88
Democratic	Antonio Lucero	49,426	46.9
Farmer–Labor	A.J. McDonald	1,290	1.22
Majority		5,246	4.98
Turnout		105,388	
Republican gain from Democratic			

1922 United States House of Representatives election in New Mexico
Party	Candidate	Votes	%	±%
Democratic	John Morrow	59,254	54.42	+7.25%
Republican	Adelina Otero-Warren	49,635	45.58	−6.3%
Majority		9,619	8.83	+3.85%
Turnout		108,889		
Democratic gain from Republican		Swing		

1924 United States House of Representatives election in New Mexico
Party	Candidate	Votes	%	±%
Democratic	John Morrow	57,802	51.76	−2.66%
Republican	J. Felipe Hubbell	53,860	48.24	+2.66%
Majority		3,942	3.53	−5.30%
Turnout		111,662		
Democratic hold		Swing		

1926 United States House of Representatives election in New Mexico
Party	Candidate	Votes	%	±%
Democratic	John Morrow	55,433	51.42	−0.34%
Republican	Juan A. A. Sedillo	52,075	48.31	+0.07%
Socialist	E. E. Denniston	287	0.27	+0.27%
Majority		3,358	3.12	−0.41%
Turnout		107,795		
Democratic hold		Swing		

1928 United States House of Representatives election in New Mexico
Party	Candidate	Votes	%	±%
Republican	Albert G. Simms	61,208	52.2	+3.89%
Democratic	John Morrow	56,048	47.8	−3.62%
Majority		5,160	4.4	+1.28%
Turnout		117,256		
Republican gain from Democratic		Swing		

1930 United States House of Representatives election in New Mexico
Party	Candidate	Votes	%	±%
Democratic	Dennis Chavez	65,194	57.1	+9.3%
Republican	Albert G. Simms	48,699	42.65	−9.55%
Socialist	John Whitley	299	0.26	+0.26%
Majority		16,495	14.45	+10.05%
Turnout		114,192		
Democratic gain from Republican		Swing		

1932 United States House of Representatives election in New Mexico
Party	Candidate	Votes	%	±%
Democratic	Dennis Chavez	94,764	63.36	+6.26%
Republican	Jose E. Armijo	52,905	35.37	−7.28%
Socialist	N. S. Sweeney	1,349	0.9	+0.64%
Liberty	L. E. Lake	418	0.28	+0.28%
Communist	E. T. Howell	132	0.09	+0.09%
Majority		41,859	27.99	+13.54%
Turnout		149,568		
Democratic hold		Swing		

1934 United States House of Representatives election in New Mexico
Party	Candidate	Votes	%	±%
Democratic	John J. Dempsey	76,833	51.82	−11.54%
Republican	Maurecio F. Miera	70,659	47.66	+12.29%
Socialist	Frank Edwards	643	0.43	−0.47%
Communist	H. Turnbaugh	133	0.09	+0.00%
Majority		6,174	4.16	−23.83%
Turnout		148,268		
Democratic hold		Swing		

1936 United States House of Representatives election in New Mexico
Party	Candidate	Votes	%	±%
Democratic	John J. Dempsey	105,937	62.92	+11.10%
Republican	M. Ralph Brown	62,375	37.05	−10.61%
Farmer–Labor	Albert Ortiz	61	0.03	+0.03%
Majority		43,562	25.87	+21.71%
Turnout		168,373		
Democratic hold		Swing		

1938 United States House of Representatives election in New Mexico
Party	Candidate	Votes	%	±%
Democratic	John J. Dempsey	90,608	58.4	−4.52%
Republican	Peace C. Rodney	64,281	41.43	+4.38%
Independent	E. W. Fawkes	268	0.17	+0.17%
Majority		26,327	16.97	−8.9%
Turnout		155,157		
Democratic hold		Swing		
