= 1957 New Mexico's at-large congressional district special election =

1957 United States House election in New Mexico special election
- April 9, 1957
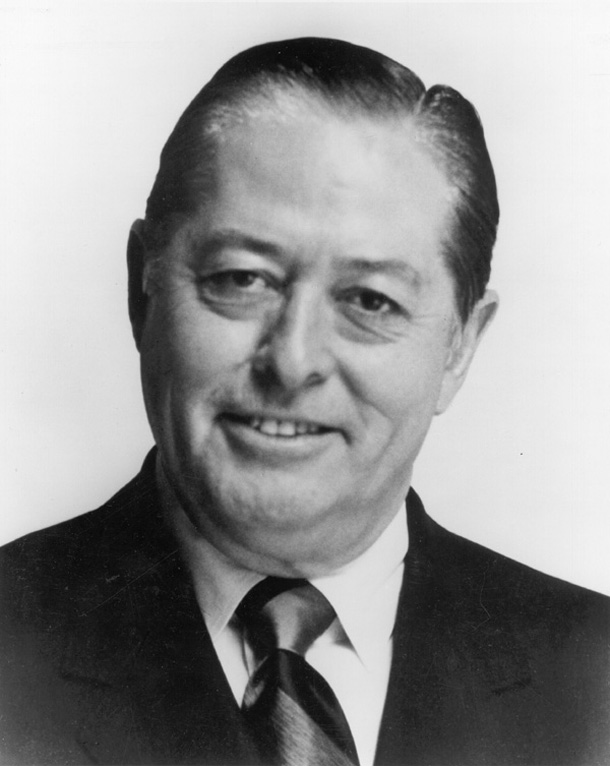

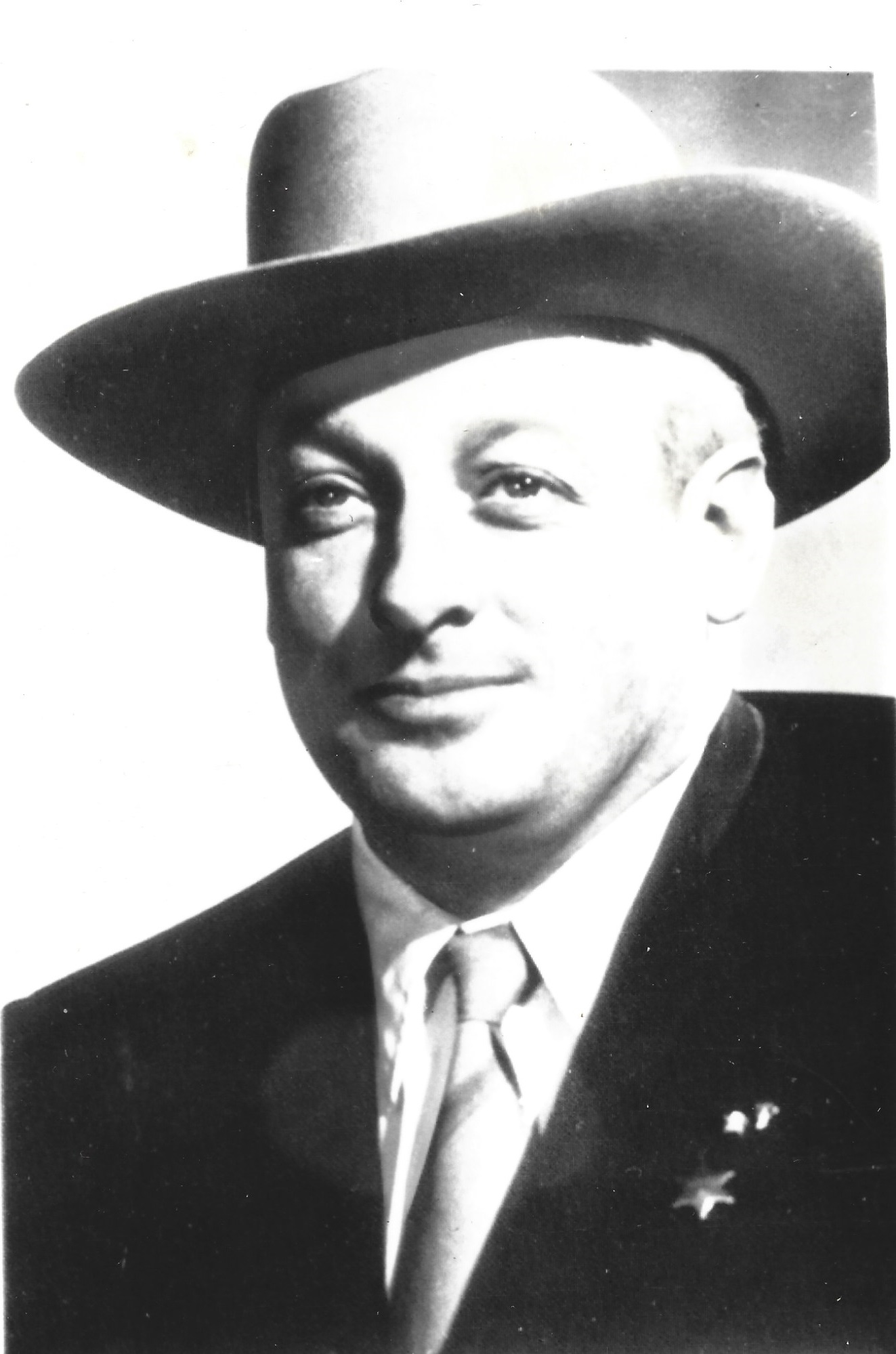
Nominee	Joseph Montoya	Tom Bolack
Party	Democratic	Republican
Popular vote	72,889	64,589
Percentage	53.02%	46.98%
- County results Montoya: 50–60% 60–70% Bolack: 50–60%
Representative
At-large before election
John J. Dempsey
Democratic
Elected Representative
At-large
Joseph Montoya
Democratic

The 1957 New Mexico's at-large congressional district special election was held on Tuesday April 9, 1957 to fill the vacancy caused by the death of At-Large representative John J. Dempsey.

Lieutenant Governor Joseph Montoya won the special election by a margin of 6.04 percentage points. He would continue to represent New Mexico's at-large congressional district until 1964.

== Results ==
New Mexico At-large congressional district special election, 1957
Party	Candidate	Votes	%
Democratic	Joseph Montoya	72,889	53.02
Republican	Tom Bolack	64,589	46.98
Total votes		130,491	100.00
Democratic hold			
