= 1938 United States House of Representatives election in New Mexico =

1938 United States House election in New Mexico
- November 8, 1938
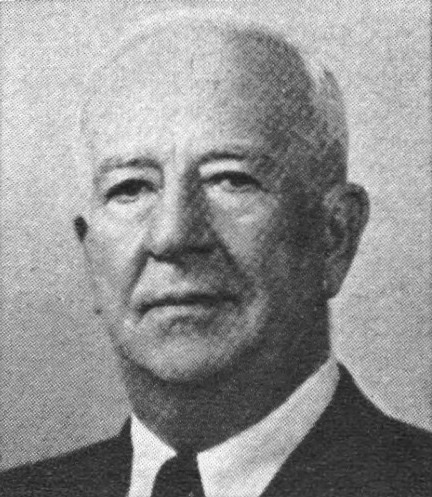

Nominee	John J. Dempsey	Peace C. Rodney
Party	Democratic	Republican
Popular vote	90,608	64,281
Percentage	58.4%	41.4%
- County results Dempsey: 50–60% 60–70% 70–80% Rodney: 50–60%
Representative
At-large before election
John J. Dempsey
Democratic
Elected Representative
At-large
John J. Dempsey
Democratic

The 1938 United States House of Representatives election in New Mexico was held on Tuesday November 8, 1938 to elect the state's at-large member to serve in the United States House of Representatives in the 76th United States Congress. This election coincided with other state and local offices such as the Governor election. John Dempsey ran for re-election to a third term and won by 16.97 percentage points. He outperformed John E. Miles in the governor race by 12.32%.

== Results ==
New Mexico At-large congressional district election, 1938
Party	Candidate	Votes	%	
Democratic	John J. Dempsey	90,608	58.4	−4.52%
Republican	Peace C. Rodney	64,281	41.43	+4.38%
Independent	E. W. Fawkes	268	0.17	+0.17%
Majority		26,327	16.97	−8.9%
Turnout		155,157		
Democratic hold		Swing		
