= 1934 United States House of Representatives election in New Mexico =

1934 United States House election in New Mexico
- November 6, 1934
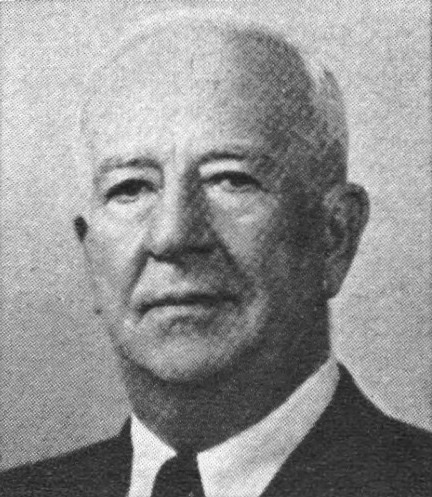

Nominee	John J. Dempsey	Maurecio F. Miera
Party	Democratic	Republican
Popular vote	76,833	70,659
Percentage	51.82%	47.66%
- County results Dempsey: 50–60% 60–70% 70–80% 80–90% Miera: 50–60% 60–70%
Representative
At-large before election
Dennis Chávez
Democratic
Elected Representative
At-large
John J. Dempsey
Democratic

The 1934 United States House of Representatives election in New Mexico was held on Tuesday November 6, 1934 to elect the state's at-large representative. Incumbent Dennis Chávez decided not to run for re-election and instead opted to run in the concurrent Senate election. This was the first open seat since 1922. Dempsey prevailed in this open seat by a narrow 4 point margin.

== Results ==
New Mexico At-large congressional district election, 1934
Party	Candidate	Votes	%	
Democratic	John J. Dempsey	76,833	51.82	−11.54%
Republican	Maurecio F. Miera	70,659	47.66	+12.29%
Socialist	Frank Edwards	643	0.43	−0.47%
Communist	H. Turnbaugh	133	0.09	+0.00%
Majority		6,174	4.16	−23.83%
Turnout		148,268		
Democratic hold		Swing		
