= Minzner =

Minzner is a surname. Notable people with the surname include:

- Carl Minzner, American legal scholar
- Pamela B. Minzner (1943–2007), American chief justice
