= James B. Jones =

American politician

13th Lieutenant Governor of New Mexico
- In office January 1, 1943 – January 1, 1947
- Governor: John J. Dempsey
- Preceded by: Ceferino Quintana
- Succeeded by: Joseph Montoya

Personal details
- Born: September 24, 1886 Edgefield, South Carolina, United States
- Died: August 9, 1947 (aged 60) Albuquerque, New Mexico, United States
- Party: Democratic
- Spouse: Maud St. Vrain (m. 1913)
- Relatives: William B. Travis (grandfather)

James Brooks Jones (September 24, 1886 – August 9, 1947), nicknamed "Jawbone", was an American politician from the US state of New Mexico. He served as the 13th lieutenant governor of New Mexico from January 1, 1943, to January 1, 1947.

== Early life ==
Jones was born in Edgefield, South Carolina, United States, on September 23, 1886. His grandfather, William B. Travis, was the commander of the Texas Army at the battle of the Alamo. Jones lived in South Carolina until he was 18 years old, when he moved to Wyoming and worked on a sheep ranch. He enlisted in the United States Marine Corps in 1912 and rose to the rank of corporal. He then served in the United States Army from April 1917 to April 1919 in the infantry and became a first lieutenant. He fought with the Army in World War I. After the war, he settled in Raton, New Mexico.

Jones moved to Albuquerque, New Mexico, in 1920, and worked as a traveling salesman for a soap company. He earned the nickname "Jawbone" from the Spanish word for soap, jabón.

== Political career ==
In 1940, Jones was a candidate for lieutenant governor of New Mexico. He lost the Democratic Party nomination in the primary election to Ceferino Quintana. Jones ran again in 1942, and won the nomination, defeating A. K. Montgomery and two other candidates in September. He then won the general election. Jones served two terms as lieutenant governor to Governor John J. Dempsey. He served as acting governor for 268 days over 21 separate occasions when Dempsey was out of the state.

Jones ran for a seat from New Mexico's at-large congressional district in the United States House of Representatives in the 1946 elections. He lost the race.

== Personal life ==
Jones married Maud St. Vrain, a grand-niece of Ceran St. Vrain, in 1913. They had four children. One son, Preston Jones, was a playwright. His other son, James Jr., was taken prisoner during World War II.

Falling ill after losing the 1946 election, Jones moved to Hot Springs. He died on August 9, 1947, at the Methodist Sanitarium in Albuquerque. He was buried in the Santa Fe National Cemetery.
