= 1920 United States House of Representatives election in New Mexico =

1920 United States House election in New Mexico
- November 2, 1920
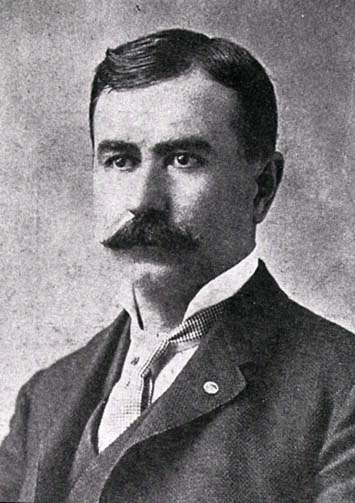

Nominee	Néstor Montoya	Antonio Lucero
Party	Republican	Democratic
Popular vote	54,672	49,426
Percentage	51.88%	46.90%
- County results Montoya: 40–50% 50–60% 60–70% Lucero: 50–60% 60–70% 70–80%
Representative
At-large before election
Benigno C. Hernández
Republican
Elected Representative
At-large
Néstor Montoya
Republican

The 1920 United States House of Representatives election in New Mexico was held on November 2, 1920, to elect the state's at-large representative. Incumbent Republican Benigno C. Hernández chose not to run for re-election to a third term.

This was the first time republicans won this district in back to back elections. Montoya under performed Warren G. Harding's performance in the concurrent presidential election by about 5 percentage points.

== Results ==
New Mexico At-large congressional district election, 1920
Party	Candidate	Votes	%
Republican	Néstor Montoya	54,672	51.88
Democratic	Antonio Lucero	49,426	46.90
Socialist	A. J. McDonald	1,290	1.22
Total votes		108,798	100.00
Republican hold			
