= 1930 United States House of Representatives election in New Mexico =

1930 United States House election in New Mexico
- November 4, 1930
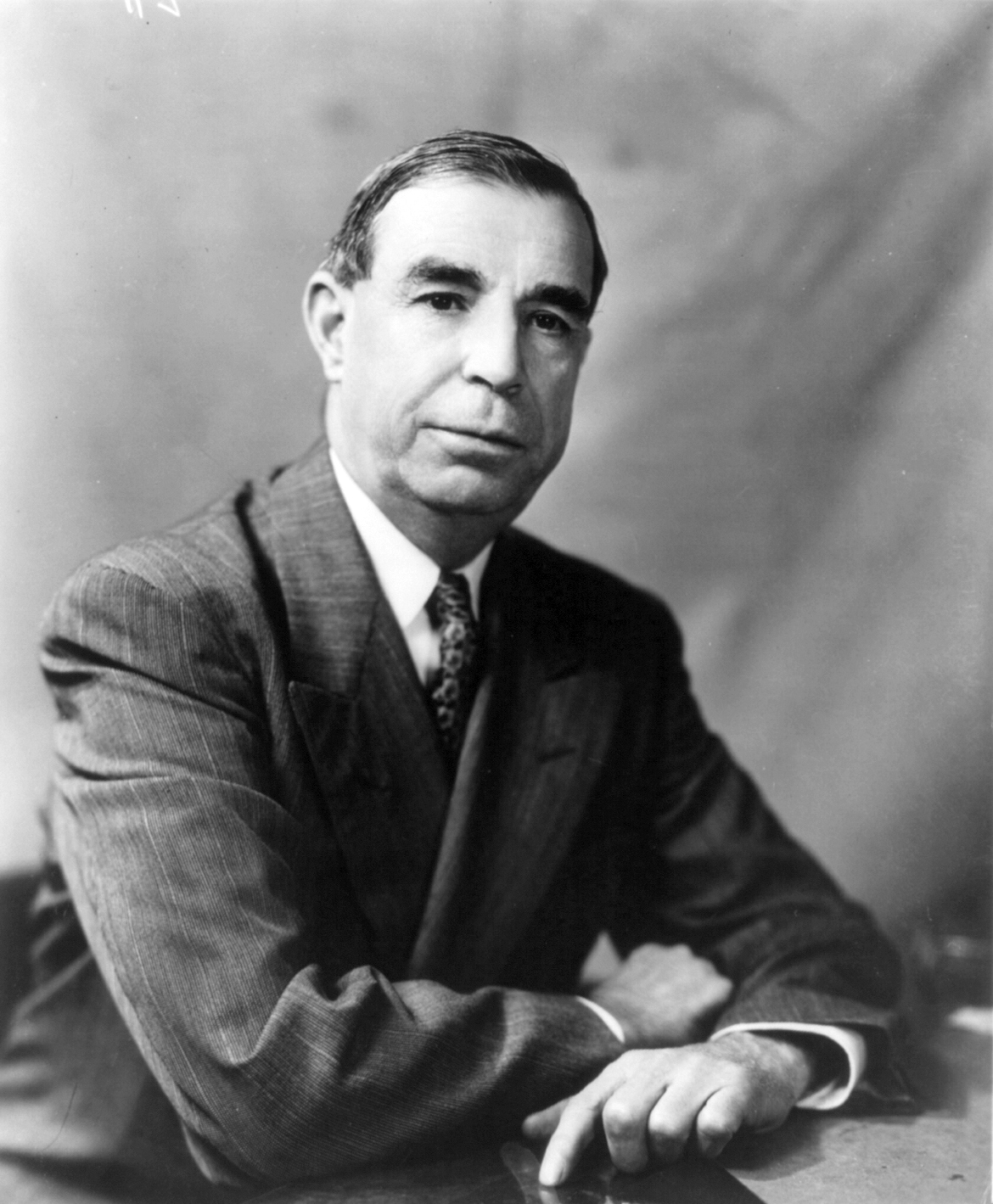

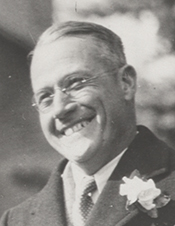
Nominee	Dennis Chávez	Albert G. Simms
Party	Democratic	Republican
Popular vote	65,194	51,655
Percentage	55.7%	44.1%
- County results Chávez: 50–60% 60–70% 70–80% 80–90% Simms: 40–50% 50–60%
Representative
At-large before election
Albert G. Simms
Republican
Elected Representative
At-large
Dennis Chávez
Democratic

The 1930 United States House of Representatives election in New Mexico was held on Tuesday November 4, 1930, to elect the states at-large representative. This election coincided with other house elections and the states Governor election. Democrat challenger Dennis Chávez defeated incumbent Albert G. Simms by a double digit margin of 11.6 percentage points.

== Results ==
New Mexico At-large congressional district election, 1930
Party	Candidate	Votes	%
Democratic	Dennis Chávez	65,194	55.65
Republican	Albert G. Simms (incumbent)	51,655	44.09
Socialist	John Whitley	299	0.26
Total votes		117,148	100.00
Democratic gain from Republican			
