= 1942 New Mexico gubernatorial election =

- November 3, 1942
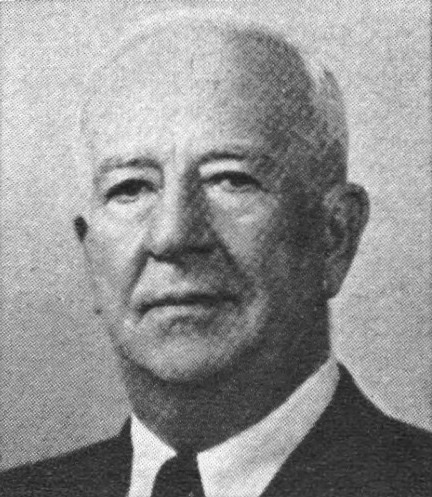

Nominee	John J. Dempsey	Joseph F. Tondre
Party	Democratic	Republican
Popular vote	59,258	49,380
Percentage	54.55%	45.45%
- County results Dempsey: 50–60% 60–70% 70–80% 80–90% Tondre: 50–60% 60–70%
Governor before election
John E. Miles
Democratic
Elected Governor
John J. Dempsey
Democratic

The 1942 New Mexico gubernatorial election took place on November 3, 1942, in order to elect the Governor of New Mexico. Incumbent Democrat John E. Miles was term-limited, and could not run for reelection to a third consecutive term. Former U.S. Representative John J. Dempsey won the open seat.

== General election ==
=== Results ===
1942 New Mexico gubernatorial election
Party	Candidate	Votes	%	±%
Democratic	John J. Dempsey	59,258	54.55%	−1.05%
Republican	Joseph F. Tondre	49,380	45.45%	+1.05%
Majority		9,878	9.09%	
Total votes		108,638	100.00%	
Democratic hold				

==== By county ====
County	John J. Dempsey Democratic		Joseph F. Tondre Republican		Margin		Total votes cast
County	#	%	#	%	#	%	Total votes cast
Bernalillo	7,880	51.39%	7,454	48.61%	426	2.78%	15,334
Catron	649	52.51%	587	47.49%	62	5.02%	1,236
Chaves	2,023	69.14%	903	30.86%	1,120	38.28%	2,926
Colfax	2,371	50.90%	2,287	49.10%	84	1.80%	4,658
Curry	1,998	78.66%	542	21.34%	1,456	57.32%	2,540
De Baca	443	71.68%	175	28.32%	268	43.37%	618
Doña Ana	3,260	65.79%	1,695	34.21%	1,565	31.58%	4,955
Eddy	2,342	79.15%	617	20.85%	1,725	58.30%	2,959
Grant	1,783	71.09%	725	28.91%	1,058	42.19%	2,508
Guadalupe	1,608	54.40%	1,348	45.60%	260	8.80%	2,956
Harding	710	51.19%	677	48.81%	33	2.38%	1,387
Hidalgo	556	82.49%	118	17.51%	438	64.99%	674
Lea	1,386	76.91%	416	23.09%	970	53.83%	1,802
Lincoln	1,032	47.78%	1,128	52.22%	-96	-4.44%	2,160
Luna	1,115	68.07%	523	31.93%	592	36.14%	1,638
McKinley	1,233	55.87%	974	44.13%	259	11.74%	2,207
Mora	1,405	43.73%	1,808	56.27%	-403	-12.54%	3,213
Otero	1,111	52.43%	1,008	47.57%	103	4.86%	2,119
Quay	1,758	78.45%	483	21.55%	1,275	56.89%	2,241
Rio Arriba	3,279	50.96%	3,155	49.04%	124	1.93%	6,434
Roosevelt	1,440	81.82%	320	18.18%	1,120	63.64%	1,760
San Juan	1,004	49.65%	1,018	50.35%	-14	-0.69%	2,022
San Miguel	4,171	53.58%	3,613	46.42%	558	7.17%	7,784
Sandoval	1,207	44.77%	1,489	55.23%	-282	-10.46%	2,696
Santa Fe	3,988	45.76%	4,727	54.24%	-739	-8.48%	8,715
Sierra	1,034	56.35%	801	43.65%	233	12.70%	1,835
Socorro	1,944	49.99%	1,945	50.01%	-1	-0.03%	3,889
Taos	2,070	45.02%	2,528	54.98%	-458	-9.96%	4,598
Torrance	1,511	44.61%	1,876	55.39%	-365	-10.78%	3,387
Union	1,334	52.33%	1,245	47.67%	119	4.67%	2,549
Valencia	1,613	33.34%	3,225	66.66%	-1,612	-33.32%	4,838
Total	59,258	54.55%	49,380	45.45%	9,878	9.09%	108,638

==== Counties that flipped from Republican to Democratic ====
- Bernalillo
- Harding
- Rio Arriba

==== Counties that flipped from Democratic to Republican ====
- Lincoln
- San Juan
