= Governor Dempsey =

Governor Dempsey may refer to:

- John J. Dempsey (1879–1958), 13th Governor of New Mexico
- John N. Dempsey (1915–1989), 81st Governor of Connecticut
