= 1926 United States House of Representatives election in New Mexico =

1926 United States House election in New Mexico
- November 2, 1926
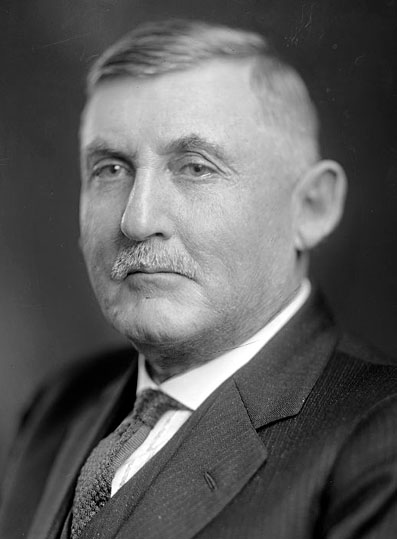

Nominee	John Morrow	Juan A. A. Sedillo
Party	Democratic	Republican
Popular vote	55,433	52,075
Percentage	51.42%	48.31%
- County results Morrow: 50–60% 60–70% 70–80% 80–90% >90% Sedillo: 50–60% 60–70% 80–90%
Representative
At-large before election
John Morrow
Democratic
Elected Representative
At-large
John Morrow
Democratic

The 1926 United States House of Representatives election in New Mexico was held on November 2, 1926, to elect the states sole at large representative. Democrat John Morrow won re-election to a third term by 3.11 percentage points. This election coincided with the states Governor election which republicans won.

== Results ==
New Mexico At-large congressional district election, 1926
Party	Candidate	Votes	%
Democratic	John Morrow (incumbent)	55,433	51.42
Republican	Juan A. A. Sedillo	52,075	48.31
Socialist	E. E. Denniston	287	0.27
Total votes		107,795	100.00
Democratic hold			
