= A. K. Montgomery =

American lawyer and politician (1903–1987)

A. K. Montgomery (November 2, 1903 – April 21, 1987) was a New Mexico lawyer and politician who founded a prominent law firm in the state and served in the New Mexico Senate.

Born in Emory, Texas, Montgomery moved to New Mexico after World War I. He received a law degree from Cumberland University in Lebanon, Tennessee, in 1927, and gained admission to the bar in New Mexico in 1931. With J.O. Seth as his law partner, Montgomery founded the prominent Santa Fe law firm of Seth & Montgomery in 1937. Montgomery was elected to represent Santa Fe County in the New Mexico Senate from 1937 to 1941, and was an unsuccessful Democratic candidate for Lieutenant Governor in 1942, losing to James B. Jones. He later served as Chairman of the State Prison Board in the 1960s. He was on the board of directors of the Santa Fe National Bank from 1962 to 1972.

His son, Seth D. Montgomery, became a justice of the New Mexico Supreme Court.

Montgomery retired to Albuquerque in 1983, and died there four years later, from kidney disease.
