= 1952 United States Senate election in New Mexico =

- November 4, 1952
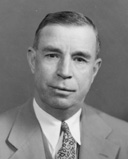

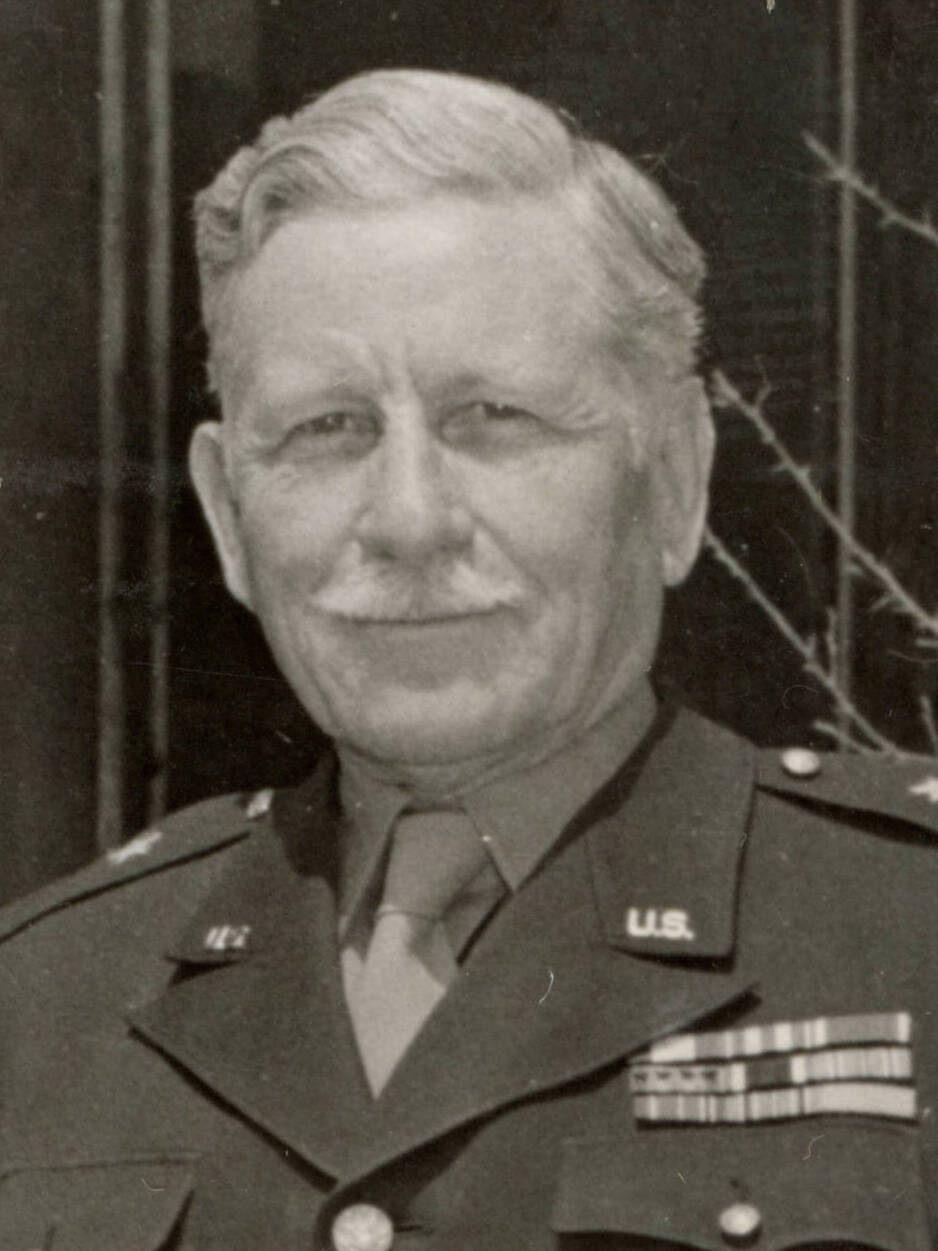
Nominee	Dennis Chávez	Patrick J. Hurley
Party	Democratic	Republican
Popular vote	122,543	117,168
Percentage	51.12%	48.88%
- County results Chávez: 50–60% 60–70% Hurley: 50–60% 60–70%
U.S. senator before election
Dennis Chávez
Democratic
Elected U.S. Senator
Dennis Chávez
Democratic

The 1952 United States Senate election in New Mexico took place on November 4, 1952. Incumbent Democratic Senator Dennis Chávez won re-election to a fourth term (third full term) against Patrick J. Hurley.

== Primary elections ==
Primary elections were held on May 6, 1952.

=== Democratic primary ===
==== Candidates ====
- Dennis Chávez, incumbent U.S. Senator
- Dean W. Miller

==== Results ====
Democratic primary results
Party	Candidate	Votes	%
Democratic	Dennis Chávez	57,645	68.15
Democratic	Dean W. Miller	26,938	31.85
Total votes		84,583	

=== Republican primary ===
==== Candidates ====
- Patrick J. Hurley, former Ambassador to China and former Ambassador to New Zealand
- Wesley Quinn
- John W. Knorr

==== Results ====
Republican primary results
Party	Candidate	Votes	%
Republican	Patrick J. Hurley	18,976 (Note: ourcampaigns.com's Republican primary vote total is 25,853 instead of 31,853, and ourcampaigns.com (on Patrick Hurley's page) says he got 50.19% of the vote instead of 59.57 or 59.58%, which means that ourcampaigns.com thinks Hurley got 12,976 votes instead of 18,976.)	59.58
Republican	Wesley Quinn	8,391	26.34
Republican	John W. Knorr	4,486	14.08
Total votes		31,853	

== General election ==
=== Results ===
1952 United States Senate election in New Mexico
Party	Candidate	Votes	%
Democratic	Dennis Chávez (incumbent)	122,543	51.12
Republican	Patrick J. Hurley	117,168	48.88
Majority		5,375	2.24
Turnout		239,711	
Democratic hold			
