= 1932 United States House of Representatives election in New Mexico =

1932 United States House election in New Mexico
- November 8, 1932
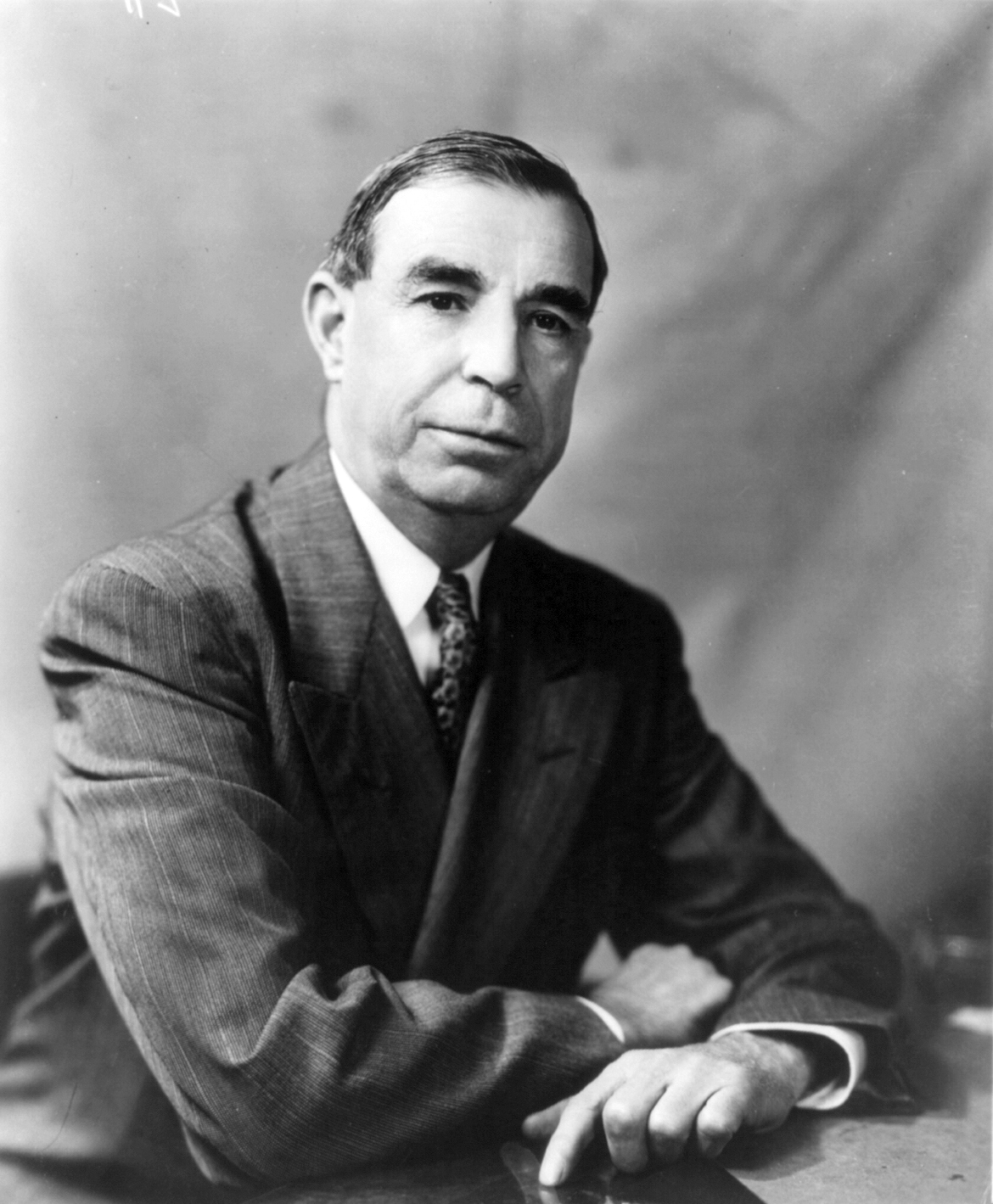

Nominee	Dennis Chávez	Jose E. Armijo
Party	Democratic	Republican
Popular vote	94,764	52,905
Percentage	63.4%	35.4%
- County results Chávez: 50–60% 60–70% 70–80% 80–90% Armijo: 50–60%
Representative
At-large before election
Dennis Chávez
Democratic
Elected Representative
At-large
Dennis Chávez
Democratic

The 1932 United States House of Representatives election in New Mexico was held on Tuesday November 8, 1932, to elect the states At-large representative. This election coincided with the state's Governor election. Incumbent democrat Dennis Chávez won re-election by a landslide margin of 28 percentage points, slightly outperforming Franklin Roosevelt in the concurrent Presidential election by 1.1 percentage points.

== Results ==
New Mexico At-large congressional district election, 1932
Party	Candidate	Votes	%
Democratic	Dennis Chávez (incumbent)	94,764	63.36
Republican	Jose E. Armijo	52,905	35.37
Socialist	N. S. Sweeney	1,349	0.90
Liberty	L. E. Lake	418	0.28
Communist	E. T. Howell	132	0.09
Total votes		149,568	100.00
Democratic hold			
