= 1922 United States House of Representatives election in New Mexico =

1922 United States House election in New Mexico
- November 7, 1922
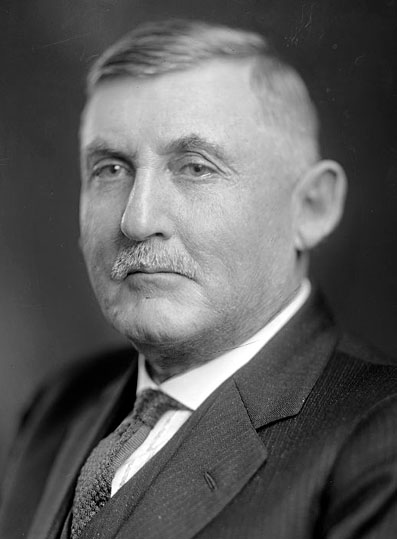

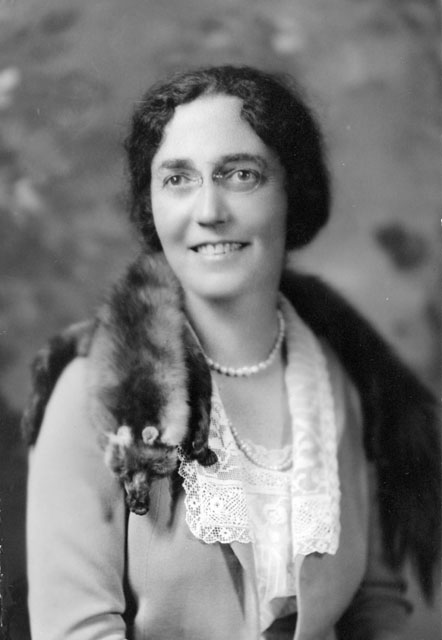
Nominee	John Morrow	Adelina Otero-Warren
Party	Democratic	Republican
Popular vote	59,254	49,635
Percentage	54.42%	45.58%
- County results Morrow: 50–60% 60–70% 70–80% 80–90% Otero-Warren: 50–60% 60–70% 70–80%
Representative
At-large before election
Néstor Montoya
Republican
Elected Representative
At-large
John Morrow
Democratic

The 1922 United States House of Representatives election in New Mexico was held on November 7, 1922, to elect the state's at-large representative. This election coincided with other state and local offices such as the concurrent Governor election.

Democratic nominee John Morrow defeated Republican Adelina Otero-Warren by a margin of 8.84 percentage points, flipping this seat from Republican to Democratic.

== Results ==
New Mexico At-large congressional district election, 1922
Party	Candidate	Votes	%	
Democratic	John Morrow	59,254	54.42	+7.25%
Republican	Adelina Otero-Warren	49,635	45.58	−6.3%
Majority		9,619	8.83	+3.85%
Turnout		108,889		
Democratic gain from Republican		Swing		
