= 1966 United States House of Representatives election in New Mexico =

1966 United States House of Representatives elections in New Mexico
- November 8, 1966

All 2 New Mexico seats to the United States House of Representatives
	Majority party	Minority party
Party	Democratic	Republican
Seats won	2	0
Popular vote	267,041	234,977
Percentage	53.2%	46.8%

The 1966 United States House of Representatives election in New Mexico was held on Tuesday November 8, 1966 to elect the state's two At-large representatives. This would be the last time New Mexico would use at-large districts instead of Single-member districts.

== Overview ==
United States House of Representatives elections in New Mexico, 1966
Party	Votes	Percentage	Seats	+/–
Democratic	267,041	53.19%	2	+1
Republican	234,977	46.81%	0	—
Totals	502,018	100.00%	2	—

== Position 1 ==
New Mexico's at-large congressional district election, 1966
Party	Candidate	Votes	%
Democratic	Thomas G. Morris (incumbent)	140,057	55.91
Republican	Schuble C. Cook	110,441	44.09
Total votes		250,498	100.00
Democratic hold			

== Position 2 ==
New Mexico's at-large congressional district election, 1966
Party	Candidate	Votes	%
Democratic	E. S. Johnny Walker (incumbent)	126,984	50.49
Republican	Robert C. Davidson	124,536	49.51
Total votes		251,520	100.00
Democratic hold			
