= 1924 United States House of Representatives election in New Mexico =

1924 United States House election in New Mexico
- November 4, 1924
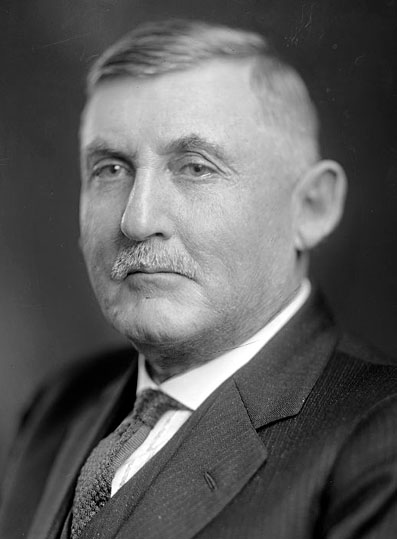

Nominee	John Morrow	J. Felipe Hubbell
Party	Democratic	Republican
Popular vote	57,802	53,860
Percentage	51.25%	47.75%
- County results Morrow: 40–50% 50–60% 60–70% 70–80% 80–90% Hubbell: 40–50% 50–60% 60–70% 70–80%
Representative
At-large before election
John Morrow
Democratic
Elected Representative
At-large
John Morrow
Democratic

The 1924 United States House of Representatives election in New Mexico was held on November 4, 1924, to elect the state's at-large representative. Incumbent Democrat John Morrow won re-election by 3.5 percentage points.

This election coincided with a Governor election and other state and local offices. John Morrow out performed Democrat John W. Davis in the concurrent presidential election by 9 points, making this the first time this district voted differently on the presidential level.

== Results ==
New Mexico At-large congressional district election, 1924
Party	Candidate	Votes	%
Democratic	John Morrow (incumbent)	57,802	51.25
Republican	J. Felipe Hubbell	53,860	47.75
Progressive Party (United States, 1924–1934)	C. M. Armstrong	1,126	1.00
Total votes		112,788	100.00
Democratic hold			
