= Ceferino Quintana =

American politician

Caferino Quintana
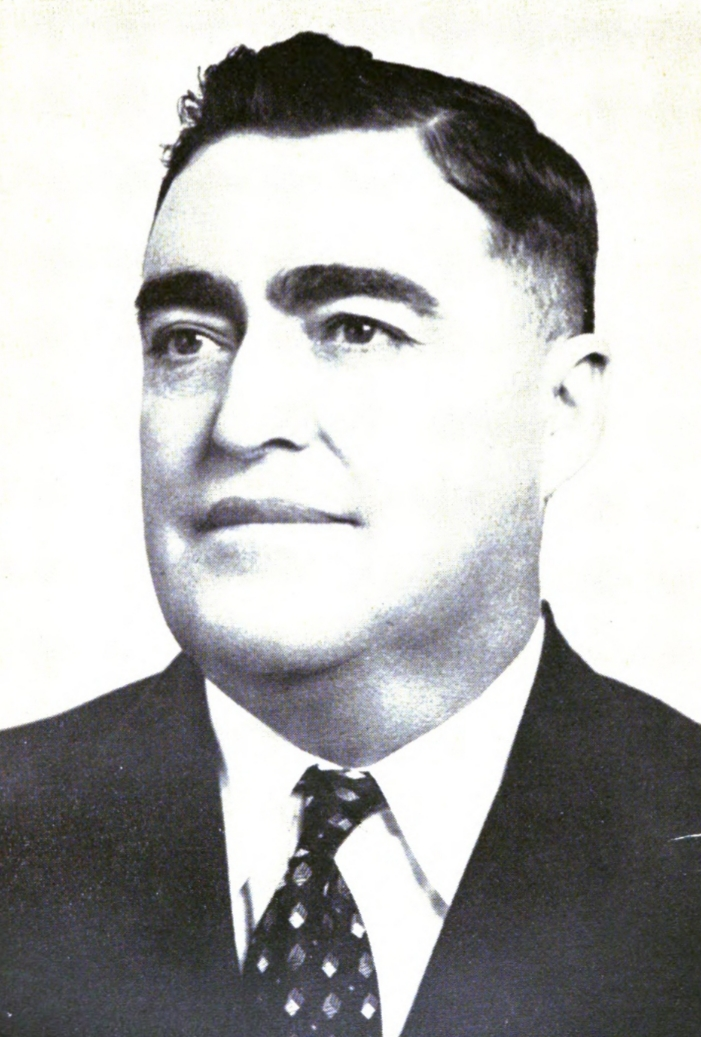

12th Lieutenant Governor of New Mexico
- In office January 1, 1941 – January 1, 1943
- Governor: John E. Miles
- Preceded by: James Murray, Sr.
- Succeeded by: James B. Jones

Personal details
- Born: August 12, 1894
- Died: March 20, 1977 (aged 82) Albuquerque, New Mexico, U.S.
- Party: Democratic

Military service
- Battles/wars: World War I

Ceferino Quintana (August 12, 1894 – March 20, 1977) was an American politician and law enforcement officer who served as the 12th lieutenant governor of New Mexico from 1941 through 1943.

== Background ==
Quintana served in World War I. He was later a U.S. Marshal, and served as the sheriff of San Miguel County, New Mexico, from 1936 through 1940. He was also chair of the San Miguel County Democratic Party in the 1930s and 1940s.

Quintana ran for lieutenant governor of New Mexico in the 1940 election, and won, taking office in 1941. He served as the acting governor of New Mexico in February and March 1941. In 1942, he decided to run for sheriff of San Miguel County, but lost the election.

Quintana lived in Pecos, New Mexico.

Quintana died at the Albuquerque Veterans Administration Medical Center on March 20, 1977.

== See also ==
- List of minority governors and lieutenant governors in the United States
