= 1936 United States House of Representatives election in New Mexico =

1936 United States House election in New Mexico
- November 3, 1936
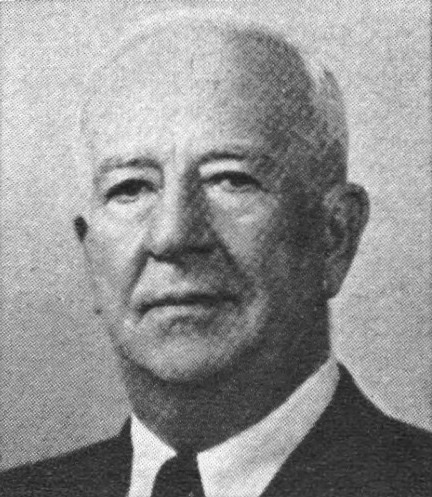

Nominee	John J. Dempsey	M. Ralph Brown
Party	Democratic	Republican
Popular vote	105,937	62,375
Percentage	62.92%	37.05%
- County results Dempsey: 50–60% 60–70% 70–80% 80–90% Brown: 50–60%
Representative
At-large before election
John J. Dempsey
Democratic
Elected Representative
At-large
John J. Dempsey
Democratic

The 1936 United States House of Representatives election in New Mexico was held on Tuesday November 3, 1936 to elect the state's at-large member to serve in the United States House of Representatives. Incumbent congressman John Dempsey ran for re-election to a second term and won by a large margin of 25.87%. This election coincided with the state's Governor election and other state and local offices. Dempsey slightly under performed Franklin D. Roosevelt in the concurrent Presidential election by about 0.3 percentage points.

== Results ==
New Mexico At-large congressional district election, 1936
Party	Candidate	Votes	%	
Democratic	John J. Dempsey (incumbent)	105,937	62.92	+11.10%
Republican	M. Ralph Brown	62,375	37.05	−10.61%
Farmer–Labor	Albert Ortiz	61	0.03	+0.03%
Majority		43,562	25.87	+21.71%
Turnout		168,373		
Democratic hold		Swing		
