= Alfonso T. Montoya =

American politician (1927–1973)

Member of the New Mexico House of Representatives
- In office 1959–1960

Member of the New Mexico Senate
- In office 1961–1973

Personal details
- Born: 1927
- Died: January 14, 1973 (aged 46)
- Party: Democratic
- Relatives: Joseph M. Montoya (brother); Tom O. Montoya (brother); Ted R. Montoya (brother)

Alfonso T. Montoya (1927 – January 14, 1973) was an American politician. He served as a Democratic member of the New Mexico House of Representatives and the New Mexico Senate.
