= Seth D. Montgomery =

American judge (1937–1998)

Justice of the New Mexico Supreme Court
- In office 1989–1994
- Appointed by: Garrey Carruthers
- Preceded by: Tony Scarborough
- Succeeded by: Pamela B. Minzner

Seth David Montgomery (February 16, 1937 – September 18, 1998) was a justice of the New Mexico Supreme Court from September 5, 1989, until his resignation on October 27, 1994.

Born in Santa Fe, New Mexico, to A. K. Montgomery and Ruth Montgomery, his father was a prominent local politician and attorney, being a partner in a large Santa Fe law firm.

Montgomery graduated Santa Fe High School in 1955 and received a B.A. from Princeton University in 1959. He served in the United States Navy from 1959 to 1962, before attending Stanford Law School, receiving a J.D. in 1965. He then joined his father's law firm, eventually becoming CEO and chair of the practice.

On August 4, 1989, Governor Garrey Carruthers appointed Montgomery to the New Mexico Supreme Court. Montgomery took office on September 5, 1989, and was elected Chief Justice by his fellow justices in 1994, serving in that capacity from February 19, 1994, to October 1, 1994.

Montgomery dealt with multiple sclerosis for several decades before his death.

Political offices
Preceded by Tony Scarborough	Justice of the New Mexico Supreme Court; 1989–1994	Succeeded by Pamela B. Minzner
