= Antonio M. Fernández =

American politician

Antonio Manuel Fernández
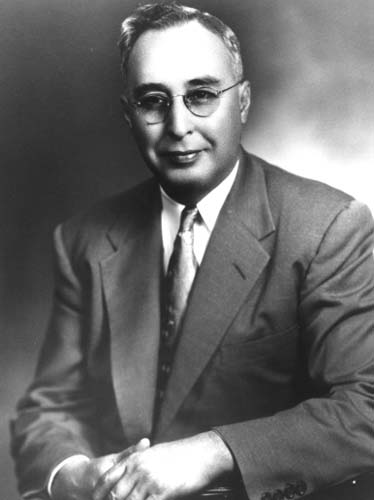

Member of the U.S. House of Representatives from New Mexico's at-large district
- In office January 3, 1943 – November 7, 1956
- Preceded by: 2nd seat re-established
- Succeeded by: Joseph Montoya

Personal details
- Born: January 17, 1902 Springer, New Mexico Territory
- Died: November 7, 1956 (aged 54) Albuquerque, New Mexico
- Resting place: Rosario Catholic Cemetery
- Party: Democratic
- Education: Highlands University; Cumberland University
- Profession: Lawyer

Antonio Manuel Fernández (January 17, 1902 – November 7, 1956) was a United States representative from New Mexico, elected to seven consecutive terms from 1942 to 1956.

== Early life and career ==
Fernandez was born in Springer, New Mexico, where he attended the public schools, and Highlands University, Las Vegas, New Mexico. He received law training at Cumberland University, Lebanon, Tennessee, and was a court reporter for the eighth judicial district of New Mexico from 1925 to 1930. Later, he was admitted to the bar in 1931 and commenced practice in Raton, New Mexico.

He was the assistant district attorney of the eighth judicial district in 1933 and practiced law in Santa Fe, New Mexico, in 1934.

== Political career ==
Fernández served in the New Mexico House of Representatives in 1935. He was the chief tax attorney for the New Mexico Tax Commission in 1935 and 1936 and the first assistant attorney general from 1937 to 1941. He was a member of the first New Mexico Public Service Commission in 1941 and 1942.

=== Congress ===
He was elected as a Democrat to the 78th and to the six succeeding Congresses and served from January 3, 1943, until his death. Fernández was the chairman, Committee on Memorials (Seventy-ninth Congress).

== Death ==
Soon after being reelected to the 85th Congress, he died in Albuquerque, New Mexico, on November 7, 1956, a day after. Fernandez was buried in Rosario Catholic Cemetery in Santa Fe, New Mexico.

== See also ==
- List of Hispanic and Latino Americans in the United States Congress
- List of members of the United States Congress who died in office (1950–1999)

U.S. House of Representatives
New seat	Member of the U.S. House of Representatives from New Mexico's at-large congressional district January 3, 1943 – November 7, 1956	Succeeded by Joseph Montoya
