= Pamela B. Minzner =

American judge (1943–2007)

Chief Justice of the New Mexico Supreme Court
- In office 1999–2000

Associate Justice of the New Mexico Supreme Court
- In office December 2, 1994 – August 31, 2007
- Preceded by: Seth D. Montgomery
- Succeeded by: Charles W. Daniels

Personal details
- Born: Pamela Burgy; November 19, 1943 Albuquerque, New Mexico, U.S.
- Died: August 31, 2007 (aged 63)
- Education: University of Miami (BA); Harvard Law School (JD)

Pamela Burgy Minzner (November 19, 1943 – August 31, 2007) was the New Mexico Supreme Court’s first female chief justice.

Born on November 19, 1943, she earned her bachelor's degree from the University of Miami (1965) and Juris Doctor (1968) at Harvard Law School.

Upon graduation from law school, Minzner initially worked as an attorney in Boston, Massachusetts. She was married to Richard C. Minzner, Esq., and after relocating to New Mexico in 1971, they both briefly worked together at the same law firm. A year later, she joined the University of New Mexico School of Law faculty and remained as an educator until 1984. Governor Toney Anaya appointed Minzner to the New Mexico Court of Appeals in 1984. She stayed at the Court of Appeals for ten years, serving as the court's first female Chief Judge from 1993 to 1994. On December 2, 1994, Minzner was appointed as a justice of the New Mexico Supreme Court. By 1999, her cohorts elected her as the chief justice of the New Mexico Supreme Court. Minzner made judicial history once again, as she was the first female to serve in the position. She served on the bench until her death on August 31, 2007.

== See also ==
- New Mexico Supreme Court
- List of justices of the New Mexico Supreme Court
- List of first women lawyers and judges in New Mexico

Political offices
Preceded by Seth D. Montgomery	Justice of the New Mexico Supreme Court; 1994-2007	Succeeded by Charles W. Daniels
