= Georgia Lee Lusk =

American politician (1893–1971)

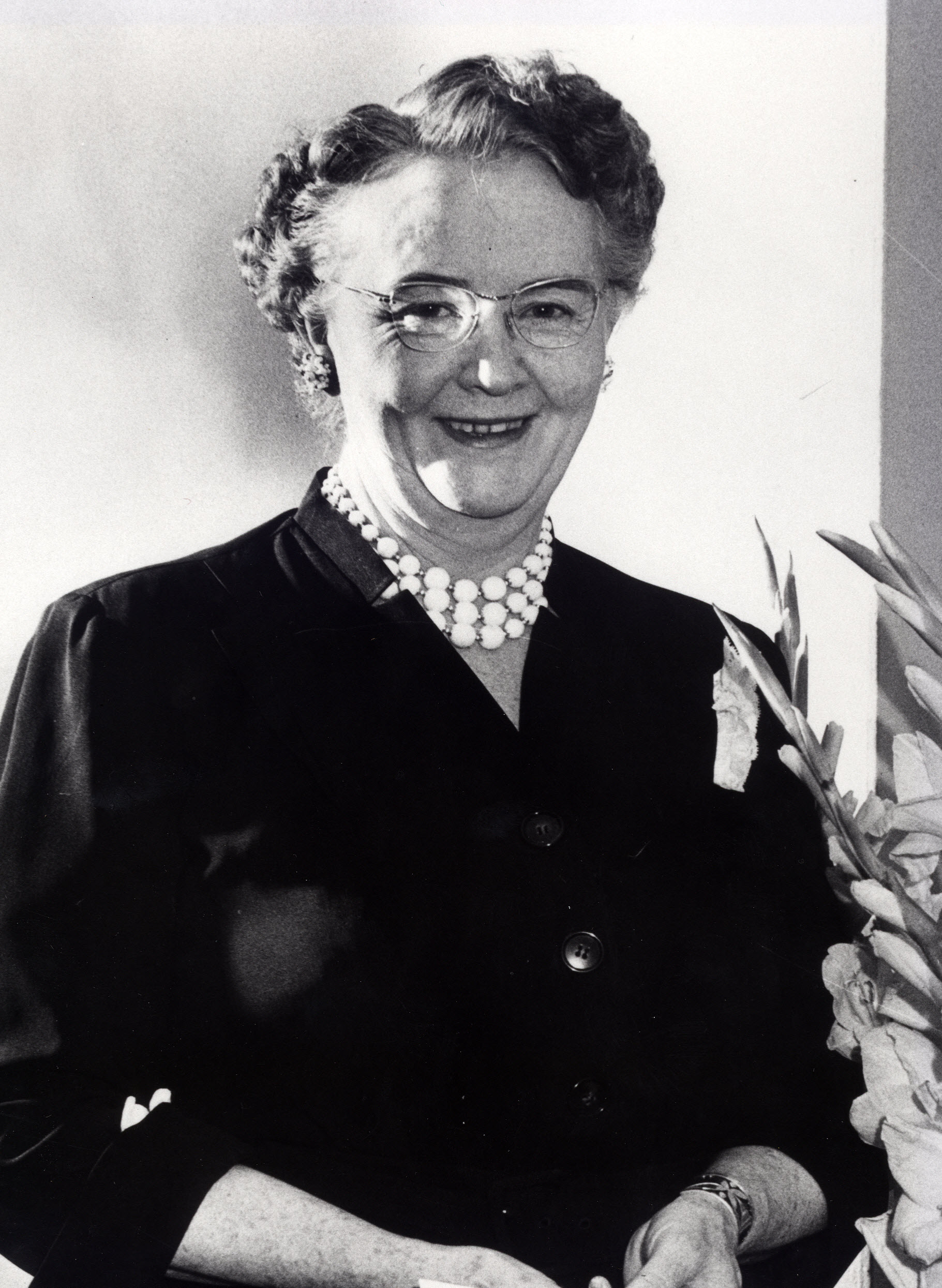

Member of the U.S. House of Representatives from New Mexico's at-large district (seat 1)
- In office January 3, 1947 – January 3, 1949
- Preceded by: Clinton P. Anderson
- Succeeded by: John E. Miles

Personal details
- Born: Georgia Lee Witt; May 12, 1893 Carlsbad, New Mexico Territory
- Died: January 5, 1971 (aged 77) Albuquerque, New Mexico, U.S.
- Party: Democratic
- Spouse: Dolph Lusk (m. 1915; died 1919)
- Children: Gene Lusk
- Education: Highlands University

Georgia Lee Witt Lusk (May 12, 1893 – January 5, 1971) was the first female U.S. Congressional representative from New Mexico, an educator, and a devoted public servant.

== Early life ==
Georgia Lee Witt (her maiden name often shortened to 'Lee'). She was born on a ranch near Carlsbad, New Mexico. After graduation from Carlsbad High School in 1912 she attended Highlands University in Las Vegas, New Mexico, and Colorado State Teachers College at Greeley. She graduated from the New Mexico State Teachers College (now Western New Mexico University) in Silver City in 1914. The following year she married a prominent rancher-banker named Dolph Lusk and taught school in Eddy County. When her husband died in 1919, Georgia Lusk was pregnant and already had two sons, but she overcame these obstacles as a widow and became manager of the family ranch while continuing to teach and raise her children.

Her oldest son, Virgil, died on duty in World War II. Third son, Gene Lusk, was a New Mexico State Senator and the Democratic nominee for governor in 1966. He killed himself while visiting his wife in hospital in 1969. Second son, Morgan, survived his mother by fewer than ten months.

== Political career ==
In 1924, women across New Mexico shook up local politics. The first female member of the New Mexico House of Representatives was elected, famed suffragist Adelina Otero-Warren shocked the state by winning the Republican nomination to run - unsuccessfully - for New Mexico's 1st Congressional District, and Georgia Lusk took her first steps into politics, being elected as superintendent of Lea County.

Lusk served in that capacity until 1929, as she made an unsuccessful bid for state Superintendent of Public Instruction in 1928. Though she lost her initial bid, she came back two years later in 1930 to win that office, and serve there until 1935. She briefly left politics to continue raising her children. She returned and during 1941 and 1942 Lusk was a rural school supervisor in Guadalupe County.

Lusk again served as State Superintendent from 1943 to 1947. It was during this time that Lusk provided New Mexico public schools with free textbooks and successfully lobbied the state legislature to fund a school construction plan, raise teacher salaries and institute a teacher's retirement program. These reforms drastically improved New Mexico's public education, and are perhaps Lusk's greatest mark upon the state.

Lusk attended the Democratic National Conventions of 1928 - the first woman to do so for New Mexico - and 1948 as a New Mexico delegate.

== Congresswoman ==
In 1946, being term limited after two successive two-year terms as Superindent, she entered the campaign for the Democratic nomination for one of New Mexico's two at-large seats in the U.S. House of Representatives. One of the seats was vacated through appointment as U.S. Secretary of Agriculture. She beat all odds to come in second to the incumbent in the primary over six other rivals, all of which were notable Democratic bosses. Lusk somehow defied and prevailed over the heavily entrenched patronage in the State Democratic Party, which sent shock waves through state politics but was overshadowed when she handily won the general election and became the first woman ever to represent New Mexico in the United States Congress.

As a member of the Committee on Veterans' Affairs, Lusk supported many of President Harry S. Truman's administration's domestic programs (although she voted to override President Truman's veto of the Taft-Hartley Act) and was a staunch backer of the administration's foreign policy proposals, voting for assistance to Greece and Turkey and endorsing universal military training. She also supported establishment of a cabinet-level Department of Education. Lusk ran for renomination to her at-large seat in the June 1948 primary but the enemies she made in 1946 did her in. In the field of five, former Governor John E. Miles led followed by the other incumbent. Lusk was third. Another woman would not serve New Mexico in Congress until Heather Wilson in 1998.

In September 1949 President Truman appointed her to the War Claims Commission, where she served with other Democratic appointees until their dismissal by President Dwight D. Eisenhower in December 1953. The Supreme Court eventually ruled the firings illegal, but Lusk had already returned to New Mexico and was elected to two additional terms as state superintendent, serving from 1955 to 1960.

== See also ==
- Women in the United States House of Representatives

== Sources ==
- United States Congress. "Georgia Lee Lusk (id: L000519)". Biographical Directory of the United States Congress.

U.S. House of Representatives
Preceded by Clinton P. Anderson	Member of the U.S. House of Representatives from New Mexico's at-large congressional district 1947–1949	Succeeded by John E. Miles
