= 1938 New Mexico gubernatorial election =

- November 8, 1938
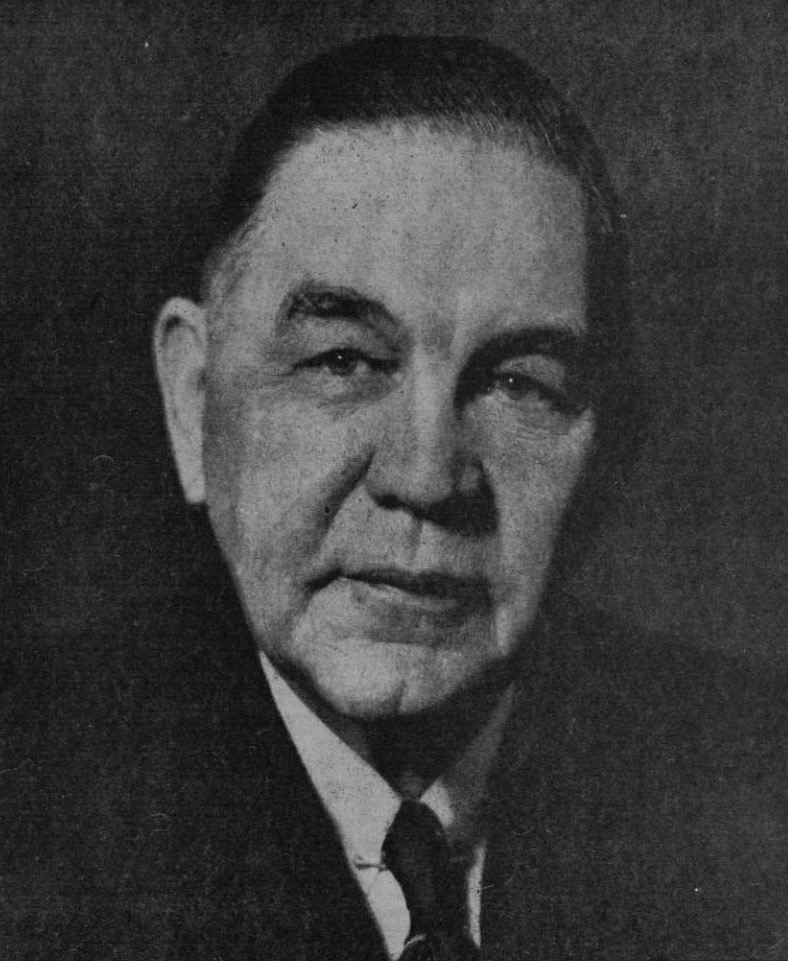

Nominee	John E. Miles	Albert K. Mitchell
Party	Democratic	Republican
Popular vote	82,344	75,017
Percentage	52.24%	47.59%
- County results Miles: 40–50% 50–60% 60–70% Mitchell: 50–60%
Governor before election
Clyde Tingley
Democratic
Elected Governor
John E. Miles
Democratic

The 1938 New Mexico gubernatorial election took place on November 8, 1938, in order to elect the Governor of New Mexico. Incumbent Democrat Clyde Tingley was term-limited, and could not run for reelection to a third consecutive term.

== General election ==
=== Results ===
1938 New Mexico gubernatorial election
Party	Candidate	Votes	%	±%
Democratic	John E. Miles	82,344	52.24%	−5.23%
Republican	Albert K. Mitchell	75,017	47.59%	+5.10%
Independent	J. D. Shuster	270	0.17%	
Majority		7,327	4.65%	
Total votes		157,631	100.00%	
Democratic hold		Swing	-10.34%	

=== Results by county ===
County	John E. Miles Democratic		Albert K. Mitchell Republican		J. D. Shuster Independent		Margin		Total votes cast
County	#	%	#	%	#	%	#	%	Total votes cast
Bernalillo	10,663	49.97%	10,547	49.43%	128	0.60%	116	0.54%	21,338
Catron	844	45.50%	1,009	54.39%	2	0.11%	-165	-8.89%	1,855
Chaves	2,965	49.24%	3,049	50.63%	8	0.13%	-84	-1.39%	6,022
Colfax	2,994	44.74%	3,695	55.22%	3	0.04%	-701	-10.48%	6,692
Curry	2,804	65.09%	1,485	34.47%	19	0.44%	1,319	30.62%	4,308
De Baca	706	58.15%	508	41.85%	0	0.00%	198	16.31%	1,214
Doña Ana	4,007	54.61%	3,316	45.19%	15	0.20%	691	9.42%	7,338
Eddy	2,834	66.90%	1,400	33.05%	2	0.05%	1,434	33.85%	4,236
Grant	2,364	53.84%	2,025	46.12%	2	0.05%	339	7.72%	4,391
Guadalupe	2,013	54.66%	1,670	45.34%	0	0.00%	343	9.31%	3,683
Harding	843	43.95%	1,075	56.05%	0	0.00%	-232	-12.10%	1,918
Hidalgo	772	62.01%	473	37.99%	0	0.00%	299	24.02%	1,245
Lea	3,355	62.80%	1,975	36.97%	12	0.22%	1,380	25.83%	5,342
Lincoln	1,379	43.79%	1,770	56.21%	0	0.00%	-391	-12.42%	3,149
Luna	1,164	52.24%	1,062	47.67%	2	0.09%	102	4.58%	2,228
McKinley	2,101	54.96%	1,721	45.02%	1	0.03%	380	9.94%	3,823
Mora	1,922	44.22%	2,424	55.78%	0	0.00%	-502	-11.55%	4,346
Otero	1,484	50.08%	1,479	49.92%	0	0.00%	5	0.17%	2,963
Quay	2,321	58.71%	1,610	40.73%	22	0.56%	711	17.99%	3,953
Rio Arriba	4,336	50.14%	4,310	49.84%	2	0.02%	26	0.30%	8,648
Roosevelt	1,793	60.62%	1,160	39.22%	5	0.17%	633	21.40%	2,958
San Juan	1,149	43.23%	1,503	56.55%	6	0.23%	-354	-13.32%	2,658
San Miguel	5,922	54.52%	4,941	45.48%	0	0.00%	981	9.03%	10,863
Sandoval	1,824	47.91%	1,978	51.96%	5	0.13%	-154	-4.05%	3,807
Santa Fe	6,406	56.87%	4,856	43.11%	3	0.03%	1,550	13.76%	11,265
Sierra	1,260	51.16%	1,195	48.52%	8	0.32%	65	2.64%	2,463
Socorro	2,526	52.58%	2,278	47.42%	0	0.00%	248	5.16%	4,804
Taos	3,127	53.69%	2,695	46.27%	2	0.03%	432	7.42%	5,824
Torrance	1,769	40.75%	2,556	58.88%	16	0.37%	-787	-18.13%	4,341
Union	1,637	45.12%	1,988	54.80%	3	0.08%	-351	-9.67%	3,628
Valencia	3,060	48.36%	3,264	51.58%	4	0.06%	-204	-3.22%	6,328
Total	82,344	52.24%	75,017	47.59%	270	0.17%	7,327	4.65%	157,631

==== Counties that flipped from Republican to Democratic ====
- Rio Arriba
- Socorro
- Taos

==== Counties that flipped from Democratic to Republican ====
- Catron
- Chaves
- Colfax
- Harding
- San Juan
- Torrance
- Union
- Valencia
