= Carl Minzner =

American legal scholar

- Other name: 明克勝
- Education: Stanford University (BA), Columbia University (MA), Columbia Law School (JD)
- Occupations: Law professor; Chinese law specialist
- Employer(s): Fordham Law School, Council on Foreign Relations

Carl Minzner is an American legal scholar currently serving as Professor of Law at Fordham Law School and a senior fellow in China studies at the Council on Foreign Relations. His research focuses on politics, rule of law, and governance in China.

== Education ==
Minzner holds a BA in international relations from Stanford University (1994) and a joint MA/JD from Columbia University School of International and Public Affairs and Columbia Law School (2000).

== Career ==
From 2003 to 2006, Minzner was a senior counsel at the Congressional Executive Commission on China. He subsequently served as an international affairs fellow at the Council on Foreign Relations from 2006 to 2007 and was appointed a senior fellow in China studies in September 2021.

== Publications ==
=== Books ===
- End of an Era: How China’s Authoritarian Revival Is Undermining Its Rise (Oxford University Press, 2018)
- As China Ages: The Politics of Demographic Decline in the Counter Reform Era (Oxford University Press, 2027)

=== Articles ===
- China’s Long Twilight: Demographic Decline, Political Paralysis, and the Fate of Great Powers, Foreign Affairs, October 5, 2026
- Xi Jinping Can't Handle an Aging China, Foreign Affairs, May 2, 2023
- China's Doomed Fight Against Demographic Decline, Foreign Affairs, May 3, 2022
- What Direction for Legal Reform under Xi Jinping, Jamestown Foundation, January 4, 2013
