= Benigno C. Hernández =

American politician (1862–1954)

Benigno Hernández
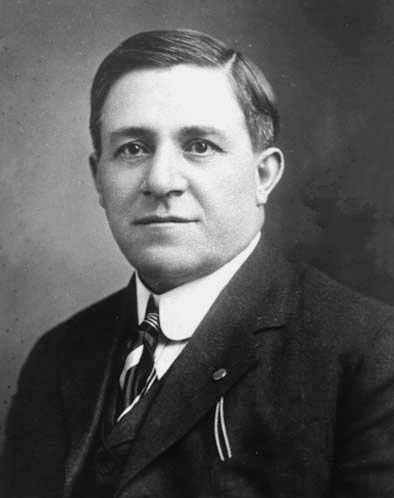

Member of the U.S. House of Representatives from New Mexico's at-large district
- In office March 4, 1915 – March 3, 1917
- Preceded by: Harvey B. Fergusson
- Succeeded by: William B. Walton
- In office March 4, 1919 – March 3, 1921
- Preceded by: William B. Walton
- Succeeded by: Néstor Montoya

Personal details
- Born: February 13, 1862 Taos, New Mexico Territory
- Died: October 18, 1954 (aged 92) Los Angeles, California, U.S.
- Party: Republican
- Occupation: businessman, politician

Benigno Cárdenas Hernández (February 13, 1862 – October 18, 1954) was the first Hispanic from New Mexico to serve as a full member of Congress.

== Biography ==
=== Early years ===
Hernández was born in Taos in the New Mexico Territory to Juan J. and Maria M. Hernández as the third of 15 children, where in his early years he attended both private and public schools. As a young man he moved to Lumberton in Rio Arriba County, where he raised sheep. In 1882 he returned to Taos, where he worked as a store clerk. In 1888 he became a private merchant, and for the next few years lived in various communities in New Mexico. In 1893 he established a store in Lumberton and six years later he set up the headquarters for his business activities in Tierra Amarilla, the county seat for Rio Arriba County.

=== Politics career ===
In 1900 Hernández began his political career when he became probate clerk and recorder in Tierra Amarilla. In 1904 he was elected county sheriff of Rio Arriba County and served for two years. From 1908 to 1912 he served as county treasurer and tax collector. In 1912 he was appointed receiver in the State Land Office in Santa Fe. During his tenure as an elected county official, he also served as a delegate to numerous State Republican Conventions. He resigned from the Santa Fe post the following year and returned to his business.

In 1914 Hernández was elected to the U.S. House of Representatives; he sought reelection in 1916, but was defeated by William B. Walton. He was a delegate to the Republican National Convention that year, as he had been at the last one. Hernández was elected to the U.S. House seat again in 1918 when Walton ran for the U.S. Senate instead of seeking reelection. During his tenure in Congress, Hernández served on the Committee on Indian Affairs, the Agriculture Committee, and the Committee on Public Lands. He showed a special interest in the construction of an infrastructure for New Mexico, including bridges, reservoirs, dams, and public buildings.

In 1921, Hernández completed his second term and returned to New Mexico. On April 22, 1921 President Warren G. Harding appointed him collector of Internal Revenue for New Mexico. Hernández held that post until the inauguration of the Democratic administration of Franklin D. Roosevelt in 1933, when he resigned and retired from active political life at age seventy-one. In 1934, he became an organizer for the political advocacy group League of United Latin American Citizens. During World War II he served on the Selective Service Board of New Mexico. In the early 1950s Hernández moved to Los Angeles, California, and died there at age 92.

U.S. House of Representatives
Preceded by Harvey B. Fergusson	Member of the U.S. House of Representatives from New Mexico's 1st congressional district March 4, 1915 – March 3, 1917	Succeeded by William Bell Walton
Preceded by William Bell Walton	Member of the U.S. House of Representatives from New Mexico's 1st congressional district March 4, 1919 – March 3, 1921	Succeeded by Néstor Montoya

== See also ==
- List of Hispanic and Latino Americans in the United States Congress
