= Albert G. Simms =

American politician (1882–1964)

Member of the U.S. House of Representatives from New Mexico's at-large district
- In office March 4, 1929 – March 3, 1931
- Preceded by: John Morrow
- Succeeded by: Dennis Chávez

Member of the New Mexico House of Representatives
- In office 1925–1927

Personal details
- Born: Albert Gallatin Simms; October 8, 1882 Washington, Arkansas, U.S.
- Died: December 29, 1964 (aged 82) Albuquerque, New Mexico, U.S.
- Party: Republican
- Spouse: Ruth Hanna (m. 1932; died 1944)
- Education: University of Arkansas
- Occupation: accountant, lawyer, politician, banker, rancher

Albert Gallatin Simms (October 8, 1882 – December 29, 1964) was a United States representative from New Mexico. He was the husband of Ruth Hanna McCormick, who served as a United States representative from Illinois. He was born in Washington, Arkansas, where he attended private schools. He attended the University of Arkansas at Fayetteville. He moved to Monterrey, Mexico in 1906 and was employed as an accountant. In 1912, he moved to Silver City, New Mexico. He studied law, was admitted to the bar in 1915, and practiced law at Albuquerque, New Mexico until 1919.

Simms was a member of the city council from 1920 to 1922. He was also a member and chairman of the board of county commissioners of Bernalillo County, New Mexico in about the same time. He engaged in banking, serving as president of a national bank in Albuquerque (1920–1924), and as president of a mortgage company in 1924. He served as a member of the New Mexico House of Representatives from 1925 to 1927 and was elected as a Republican to the 71st United States Congress (1929–1931). He married the widowed Ruth Hanna McCormick, whom he met when both were members of Congress, on March 9, 1932. He was an unsuccessful candidate for reelection in 1930 to the Seventy-second Congress due to a Democratic takeover. The couple returned to New Mexico and established Los Poblanos, a successful farm and ranch. After leaving Congress, he was member of the Republican National Committee (1932–1934) as well as a banker, farmer, and rancher. He helped found Albuquerque Academy. He died as a resident of Albuquerque, New Mexico in 1964 and was buried in Fairview Park Cemetery.

U.S. House of Representatives
Preceded by John Morrow	Member of the U.S. House of Representatives from New Mexico's at-large congressional district 1929–1931	Succeeded by Dennis Chavez
