= Joseph Montoya =

American politician (1915–1978)

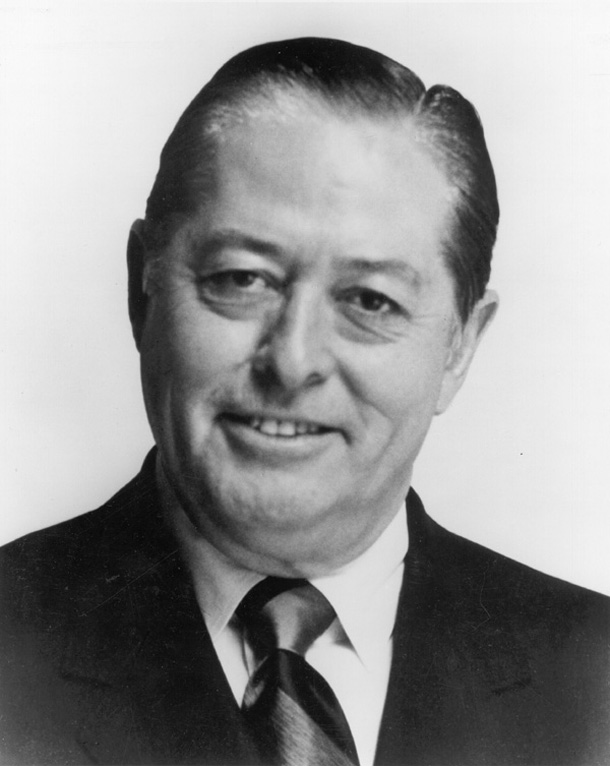

United States Senator from New Mexico
- In office November 4, 1964 – January 3, 1977
- Preceded by: Edwin L. Mechem
- Succeeded by: Harrison Schmitt

Member of the U.S. House of Representatives from New Mexico's at-large district
- In office April 9, 1957 – November 3, 1964
- Preceded by: Antonio M. Fernández
- Succeeded by: Johnny Walker

14th and 16th Lieutenant Governor of New Mexico
- In office January 1, 1955 – April 9, 1957
- Governor: John F. Simms; Edwin L. Mechem
- Preceded by: Tibo J. Chávez
- Succeeded by: Ed V. Mead
- In office January 1, 1947 – January 1, 1951
- Governor: Thomas J. Mabry
- Preceded by: James B. Jones
- Succeeded by: Tibo J. Chávez

Member of the New Mexico Senate
- In office 1940–1947

Member of the New Mexico House of Representatives
- In office 1936–1940

Personal details
- Born: Joseph Manuel Montoya; September 24, 1915 Peña Blanca, New Mexico, U.S.
- Died: June 5, 1978 (aged 62) Washington, D.C., U.S.
- Party: Democratic
- Spouse: Della Romero
- Children: 3
- Relatives: Alfonso T. Montoya (brother)
- Education: Regis University (BA); Georgetown University (LLB)

Joseph Manuel Montoya (September 24, 1915 – June 5, 1978) was an American politician and member of the Democratic Party who served as the 14th and 16th lieutenant governor of New Mexico (1947–1951 and 1955–1957), in the U.S. House of Representatives (1957–1964) and as a U.S. senator from New Mexico (1964–1977).

== Early life and education ==
Montoya was born in Peña Blanca, New Mexico. His parents, Thomas and Frances Montoya, were Roman Catholic descendants of eighteenth-century Spanish settlers to New Mexico. He received his early education in public schools in Sandoval County and graduated from Bernalillo High School in 1931. He continued his education at Regis College in Denver, Colorado. In 1934, he began law school at Georgetown University in Washington, D.C.

In 1936 at age 21, while Montoya was still at Georgetown, he became the youngest person in the history of the state to be elected to the New Mexico House of Representatives. In 1938, Montoya graduated from law school and was re-elected. The following year, he was elected as Democratic majority floor leader.

== Career ==
Montoya was elected to the New Mexico Senate in 1940, once again becoming the youngest member of that body ever elected. By the time he left the Senate in 1946, Montoya had been twice reelected to the State Senate and held the positions of majority whip and chairman of the Judiciary Committee. From 1947 to 1957 he was elected Lieutenant Governor of New Mexico three times and also served two additional terms in the State Senate.

In 1957, Montoya was elected to the U.S. House of Representatives in a special election after the sudden death of the recently reelected New Mexico Congressman Antonio M. Fernández. In Congress, Montoya gained a recognition as a political moderate, a dedicated Democrat, and a diligent legislator — qualities that earned him the esteem of his fellow legislators and made him an effective congressman. In 1962, he defeated Republican Jack C. Redman, M.D.

In 1963, he became a member of the House Appropriations Committee where he was a strong advocate of education measures and soon authored the Vocational Education Act. In 1964, he sponsored the Wilderness Act, which protected wilderness areas. Montoya won the 1964 Senate election to complete the term of Dennis Chávez, who had died in office in 1962, and also was elected to a full term. Montoya won even though the Governor of New Mexico, Edwin L. Mechem, had resigned the governorship in order to fill the seat temporarily. Thus began a twelve-year career in the Senate, where he served on the Appropriations Committee, the Public Works Committee, the Joint Committee on Atomic Energy, and Senate Watergate Committee.

In 1976, a year that was a Democratic victory nationwide, Montoya was defeated by Republican Harrison Schmitt 57% to 42%.

== Death ==
Montoya died in Washington, D.C., at the age of 62.

== See also ==
- List of Hispanic and Latino Americans in the United States Congress
- List of minority governors and lieutenant governors in the United States

Political offices
Preceded by James B. Jones	Lieutenant Governor of New Mexico; 1947–1951	Succeeded by Tibo Chávez
Preceded by Ed Mead	Lieutenant Governor of New Mexico; 1955–1957	Succeeded by Tibo Chávez
U.S. House of Representatives
Preceded by Antonio M. Fernández	Member of the U.S. House of Representatives from New Mexico's at-large congressional district Seat 2; 1957–1964	Succeeded by Johnny Walker
Party political offices
Preceded by Dennis Chávez	Democratic nominee for U.S. Senator from New Mexico (Class 1); 1964, 1970, 1976	Succeeded by Jeff Bingaman
U.S. Senate
Preceded by Edwin L. Mechem	U.S. Senator (Class 1) from New Mexico; 1964–1977; Served alongside: Clinton Anderson, Pete Domenici	Succeeded by Harrison Schmitt
