= Thomas G. Morris =

American politician (1919–2016)

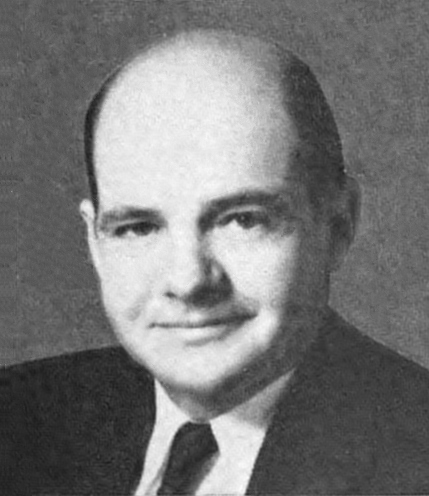

Member of the U.S. House of Representatives from New Mexico's at-large district (Seat A)
- In office January 3, 1959 – January 3, 1969
- Preceded by: John J. Dempsey
- Succeeded by: Manuel Lujan Jr. (redistricting)

Member of the New Mexico House of Representatives
- In office 1953–1958

Personal details
- Born: Thomas Gayle Morris; August 20, 1919 Carbon, Texas, U.S.
- Died: March 4, 2016 (aged 96) Amarillo, Texas, U.S.
- Party: Democratic
- Education: University of New Mexico

Thomas Gayle Morris (August 20, 1919 – March 4, 2016) was an American politician.

He was born in the town of Carbon, Eastland County, Texas. Morris moved to New Mexico and served in the United States Navy from November 12, 1937, to March 22, 1944. He then worked as a farmer in Quay County, and graduated from the University of New Mexico in 1948.

Morris served in the New Mexico House of Representatives from 1953 to 1958, and was elected as a Democrat to the United States House of Representatives in 1958. Morris began serving on January 3, 1959, and left office January 3, 1969, after being defeated for re-election.

Following the abolition of multi-seat at-large districts, Morris' home was placed in New Mexico's 1st congressional district, which covered most of Albuquerque and fanned out to cover most of northeastern New Mexico. He was narrowly defeated by Republican businessman Manuel Lujan Jr.

He ran unsuccessfully for the Democratic nomination for the United States Senate in 1972, and then served as a management consultant and vice president for Bank Securities, Inc. As of 2013 he resided in Albuquerque, New Mexico.

Thomas G. Morris donated his Congressional Papers to the New Mexico State University Library in 1973. He died in March 2016 at the age of 96.

== Sources ==
- United States Congress. "Thomas G. Morris (id: M000990)". Biographical Directory of the United States Congress.
- Thomas G. Morris Congressional Papers Finding Aid

U.S. House of Representatives
Preceded by John J. Dempsey	Member of the U.S. House of Representatives from New Mexico's 1st congressional district 1959–1969	Succeeded by Manuel Lujan, Jr.
