= Néstor Montoya =

American politician (1862–1923)

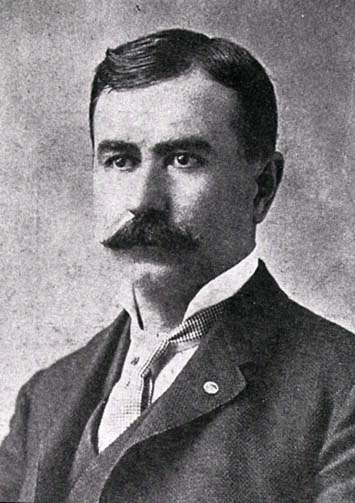

Member of the U.S. House of Representatives from New Mexico's at-large district
- In office March 4, 1921 – January 13, 1923
- Preceded by: Benigno C. Hernández
- Succeeded by: John Morrow

Personal details
- Born: April 14, 1862 Albuquerque, New Mexico Territory
- Died: January 13, 1923 (aged 60) Washington, D.C., U.S.
- Party: Republican
- Education: St. Michael's College
- Occupation: Journalist

Néstor Montoya (April 14, 1862 – January 13, 1923) was a United States representative from New Mexico. As an editor and politician, Néstor Montoya dedicated himself to the inclusion of Hispanics in the political and social life of New Mexico, and to the campaign for New Mexico statehood.

== Biography ==
=== Early life ===
He was born in Albuquerque, New Mexico to Teodosio and Encarnación (Cervantes) Montoya where he attended the public schools. In 1881, he graduated from St. Michael's College, Santa Fe, New Mexico. After graduation, he worked as a postal clerk for the U.S. Post Office in Santa Fe, and later at the U.S. Treasury Office there. He began newspaper work in 1889 and owned and edited the Spanish paper called La bandera americana.

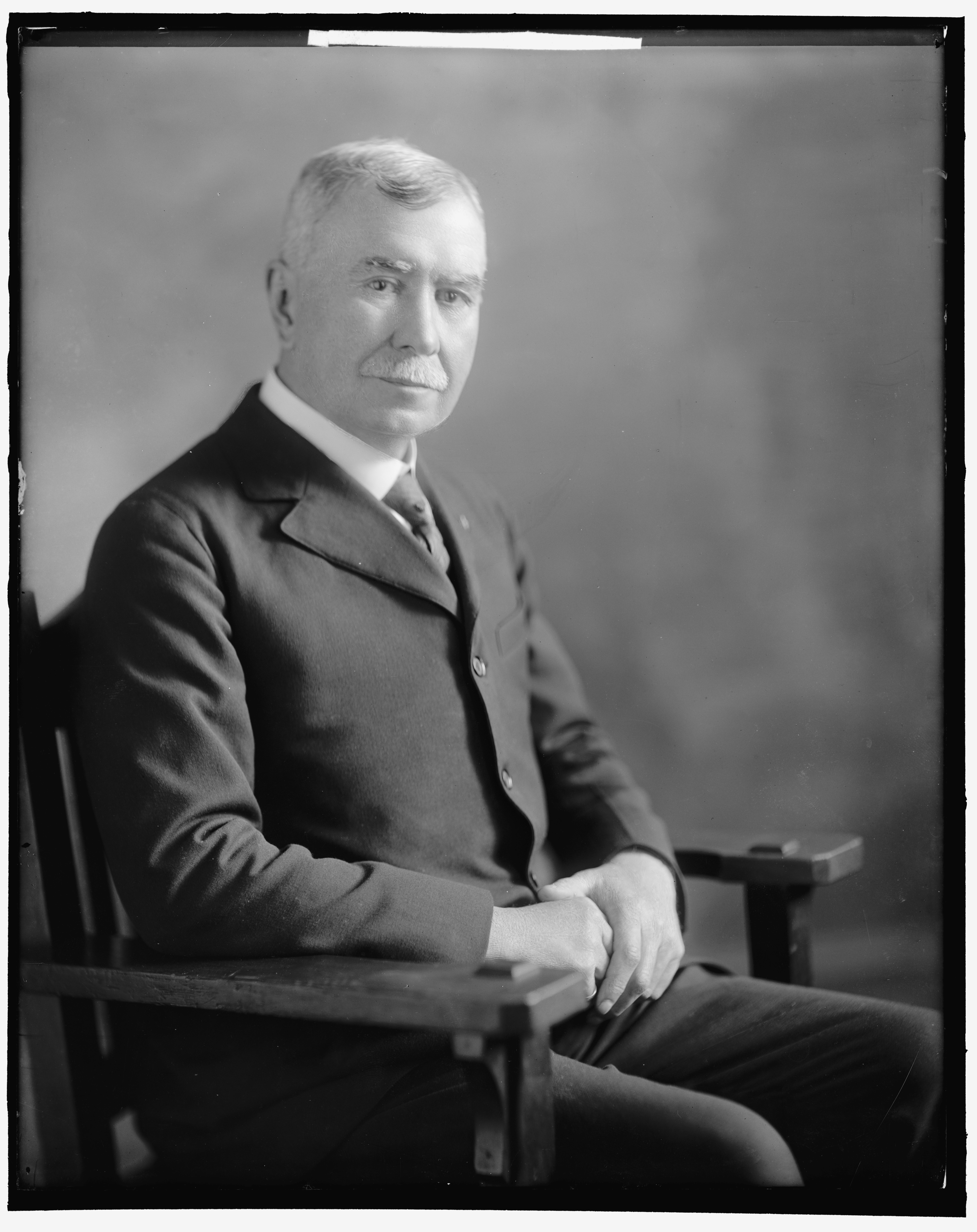
Néstor Montoya

=== Political career ===
Montoya was member of the New Mexico Territorial House of Representatives 1892–1903 and served as speaker in the latter year. He was a member of the New Mexico Territorial Senate in 1905 and 1906. He was president of the New Mexico Press Association 1908–1923. He was a delegate to the convention that drafted and adopted the state Constitution of New Mexico in 1910 and a regent of the University of New Mexico 1916–1919. He helped write provisions into the Constitution of New Mexico to protect the rights of Hispanics in the areas of education, voting, and civil liberties. Also, he was a member of the Council of National Defense 1917–1919.

Montoya was the chairman of the Bernalillo County, New Mexico draft board during the First World War and clerk of Bernalillo County in 1919 and 1920. He was elected as a Republican to the Sixty-seventh Congress and served from March 4, 1921, until his death in Washington, D.C. in 1923. While in Congress, Montoya served on the Indian Affairs Committee, and the Committee on Public Lands. The Republican Party did not renominate him for a second term and instead they nominated Adelina Otero-Warren. He was buried in Santa Barbara Cemetery in Albuquerque.

== Death ==
At the age of 60, Representative Montoya died suddenly at his home in Washington while preparing to go to work after an absence of two days for illness. He was shaving when he suffered a stroke and collapsed.

== See also ==
- List of Hispanic and Latino Americans in the United States Congress
- List of members of the United States Congress who died in office (1900–1949)

U.S. House of Representatives
Preceded by Benigno C. Hernández	Member of the U.S. House of Representatives from New Mexico's at-large congressional district 1921–1923	Succeeded by John Morrow
