= John E. Miles =

12th Governor of New Mexico

John Miles
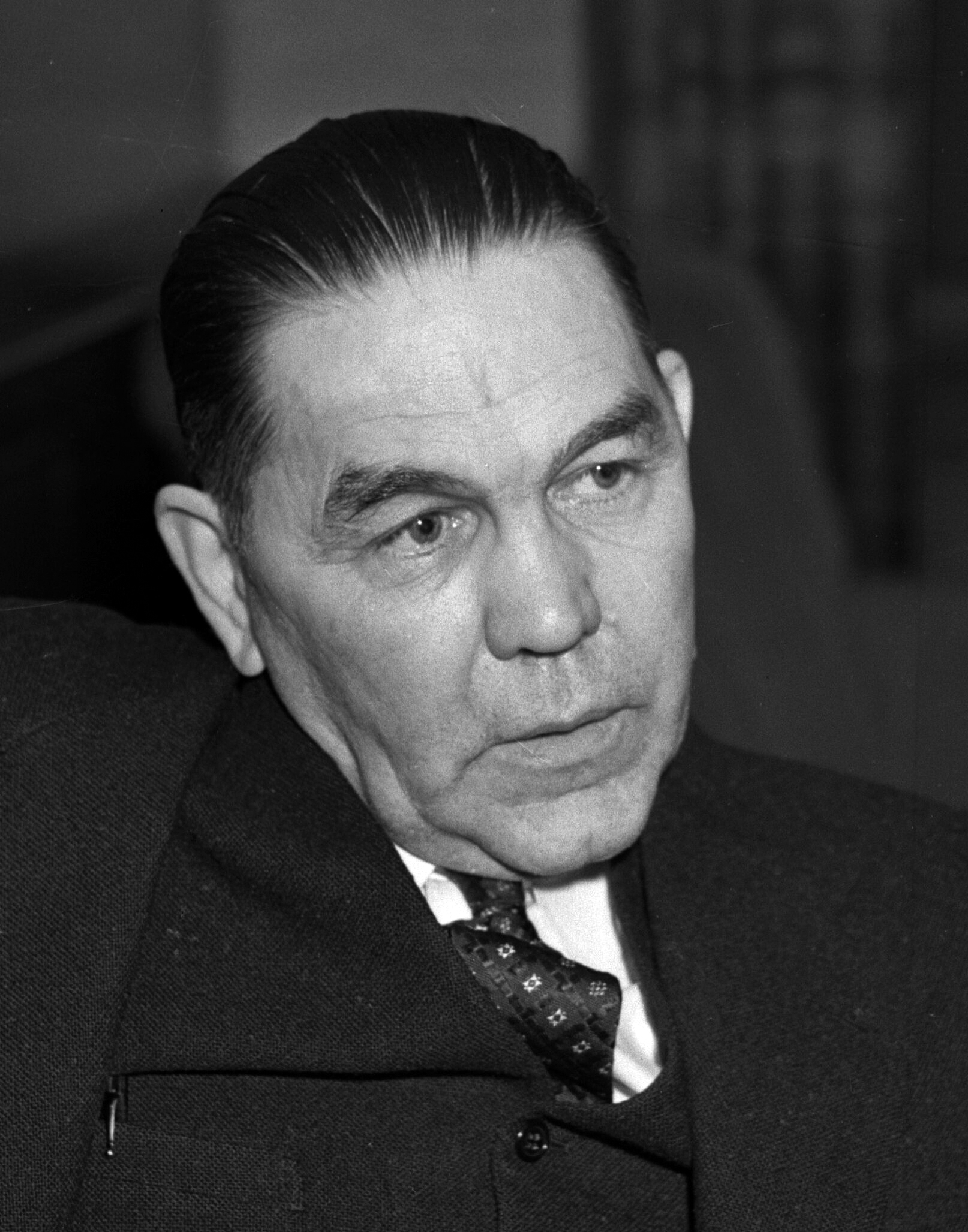
- Miles in 1938

Member of the U.S. House of Representatives from New Mexico's at-large district
- In office January 3, 1949 – January 3, 1951
- Preceded by: Georgia Lee Lusk
- Succeeded by: John J. Dempsey

12th Governor of New Mexico
- In office January 1, 1939 – January 1, 1943
- Lieutenant: James Murray, Sr. Ceferino Quintana
- Preceded by: Clyde Tingley
- Succeeded by: John J. Dempsey

Personal details
- Born: John Esten Miles; July 28, 1884 Murfreesboro, Tennessee, U.S.
- Died: October 7, 1971 (aged 87) Santa Fe, New Mexico, U.S.
- Party: Democratic
- Spouse(s): Susie Wade, Opal Wood

John Esten Miles (July 28, 1884 – October 7, 1971) was an American politician who served as the 12th governor of New Mexico.

== Biography ==
Miles was born in Murfreesboro, Tennessee. He attended the common schools of Tennessee, but left home at the age of seventeen. He settled in Texas and began farming. he did moderately well in that field, but a crop failure in 1906 convinced him to move to Oklahoma and then to New Mexico. He took a homestead there and married Susie C. Wade. Susie Wade was a member of the Choctaw Nation.

Miles began to dabble in politics as an observer at first. When the United States Democratic Party began to take back the New Mexico Legislature in the 1920s, he started taking an active role in the political spectrum. He served in several offices including Quay County Assessor (1920–1924), secretary of the New Mexico State Tax Commission (1925), and secretary of the Democratic State Central Committee.

Miles came virtually out of nowhere to be elected Governor in 1938. Upon completion of Miles' term as Governor he returned to holding various low-level organizational positions including chairman of the Public Service Commission (1943–1948), and Commissioner of Public Lands (1947–1948).

Finally, in 1948, the Democratic Party figured Miles would be an easy shot to take out Georgia Lee Lusk in a primary for her Congressional seat. He just barely edged out Lusk, and only served one term as a Congressman (1949–1951) before retiring from public life. Miles died on October 7, 1971.

Party political offices
Preceded by Clyde Tingley	Democratic nominee for Governor of New Mexico; 1938, 1940	Succeeded by John J. Dempsey
Preceded by Thomas J. Mabry	Democratic nominee for Governor of New Mexico; 1950	Succeeded by Everett Grantham
Political offices
Preceded by Clyde Tingley	Governor of New Mexico; 1939–1943	Succeeded by John J. Dempsey
U.S. House of Representatives
Preceded by Georgia Lee Lusk	Member of the U.S. House of Representatives from New Mexico's at-large congressional district 1949–1951	Succeeded by John J. Dempsey
