= Dennis Chávez =

American politician

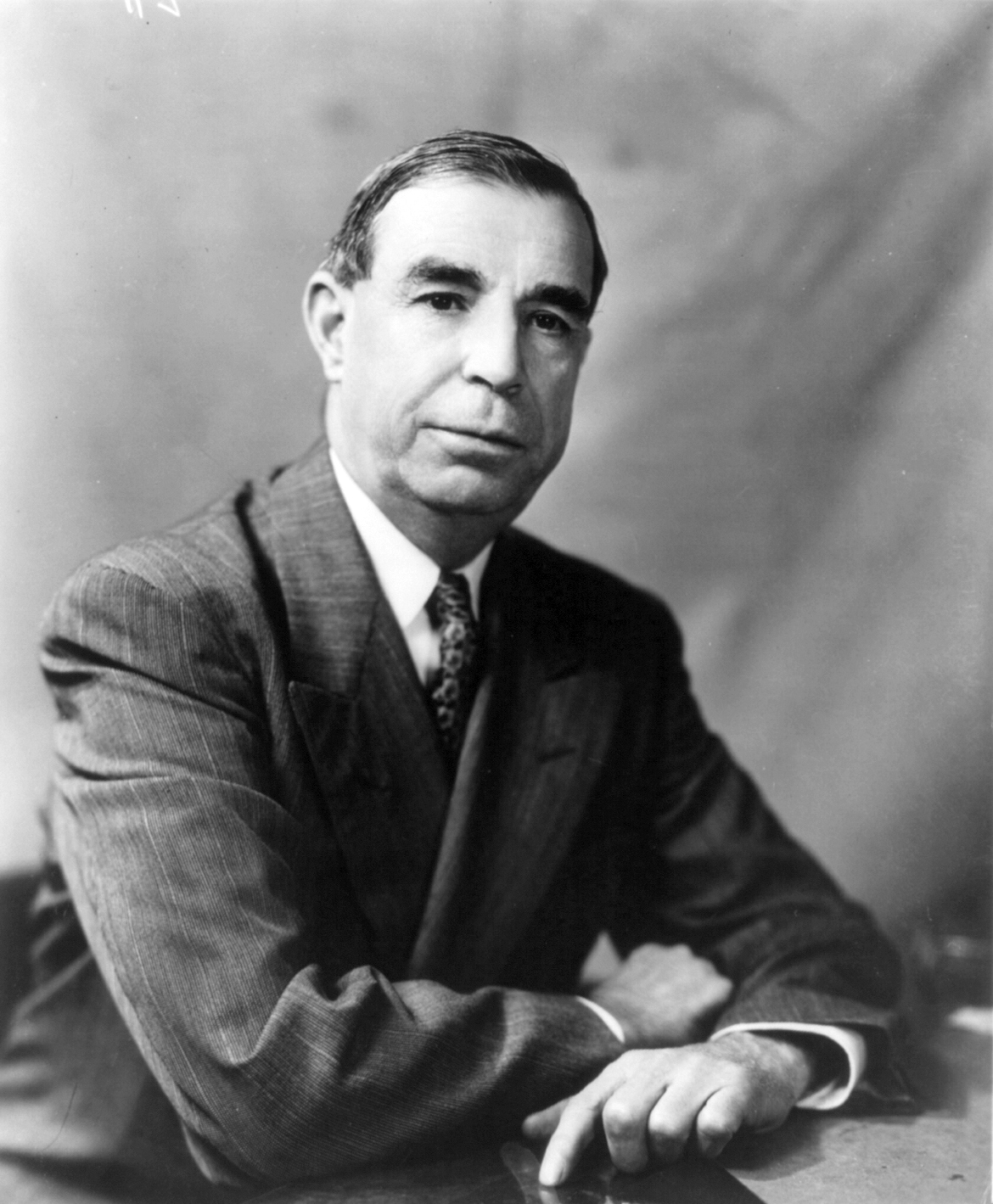

United States Senator from New Mexico
- In office May 11, 1935 – November 18, 1962
- Preceded by: Bronson M. Cutting
- Succeeded by: Edwin L. Mechem

Member of the U.S. House of Representatives from New Mexico's at-large district
- In office March 4, 1931 – January 3, 1935
- Preceded by: Albert G. Simms
- Succeeded by: John J. Dempsey

Personal details
- Born: Dionisio Chávez; April 8, 1888 Los Chavez, New Mexico Territory
- Died: November 18, 1962 (aged 74) Washington D.C., U.S.
- Party: Democratic
- Spouse: Imelda Espinosa
- Relations: David Chávez (brother)
- Children: 3
- Education: Georgetown University (LLB)

Dionisio "Dennis" Chávez (April 8, 1888 – November 18, 1962) was an American politician who served in the United States House of Representatives from 1931 to 1935, and in the United States Senate from 1935 to 1962. He was the first Hispanic person to be elected to a full term in the Senate and the first U.S. Senator to be born in New Mexico, which was still a territory at the time of his birth. In 1920, he became the first Latino lawyer in the United States.

== Early life ==
Chávez was born in Los Chavez in the New Mexico Territory. His parents, David and Paz Chávez, were members of families that had lived in Los Chavez for generations. There was no school in that town. In 1895, David Chávez moved his family to the Barelas section of Albuquerque, New Mexico, to work on the railroad and Dennis attended school until 7th grade when financial hardships necessitated that he work. His first job was delivering groceries at the Highland Grocery store. Later on, he studied engineering and surveying at night at the University of New Mexico where he was a member of the New Mexico Tau chapter of Sigma Alpha Epsilon. Later he worked as an engineer for the City of Albuquerque for several years. Dennis's younger brother, David Chávez, served as the 34th Mayor of Santa Fe, a judge of the United States District Court for the District of Puerto Rico, and as a member of the New Mexico Supreme Court.

== Career ==
=== Early career ===
Chávez worked briefly as editor of a Belen weekly newspaper, as a court interpreter, and as a private contractor until 1916, when he obtained temporary employment as a Spanish interpreter for Senator Andrieus A. Jones' election campaign. In 1917, he was offered a position as assistant executive clerk of the Senate in Washington, D.C., by Senator Jones. He accepted this position, passed a special admission exam at Georgetown University Law Center and studied law at night. He graduated from Georgetown in 1920, and returned to Albuquerque to establish a law practice. He was successful in defending organized labor and as a defense counsel in high-profile murder cases, where he used his popularity to run for office.

=== House ===
In 1922, Chávez was elected to the New Mexico state legislature, but he did not seek another term. In 1930, he was elected to New Mexico's at-large seat in the United States House of Representatives as a Democrat, and was re-elected in 1932. Chávez served as chairman of the House Committee on Irrigation and Reclamation. He did not seek re-election to the House in 1934, running instead for the United States Senate.

=== Senate ===
Chávez was the Democratic nominee for U.S. Senator from New Mexico in 1934. He lost narrowly to Republican incumbent Bronson M. Cutting. However, Cutting was killed in an airplane crash on May 6, 1935, and five days later, Chávez was appointed to fill the vacancy pending a special election. In 1936, Chávez was elected to the remaining four years of Cutting's term, and then won a full term of his own in 1940, becoming the first person of Hispanic descent to be elected to a full term in the U.S. Senate. (Octaviano Larrazolo, also from New Mexico, was the first Hispanic to be elected to the Senate, but he was only elected to the remainder of an unexpired term and never served a full term.) Chávez was re-elected again in 1946, 1952, and 1958, and served until his death in 1962. He served as chairman of the Committee on Public Works from 1949 to 1953, and again from 1955 until his death.

In 1954, Senate Republicans attempted to remove Chávez from his seat, claiming that irregularities from the 1952 election meant the election results could not be trusted. A resolution that claimed no candidate had won the 1952 election, and therefore requiring the Republican governor of New Mexico to appoint a new senator, was defeated by a vote of 36-53.

== Personal life ==
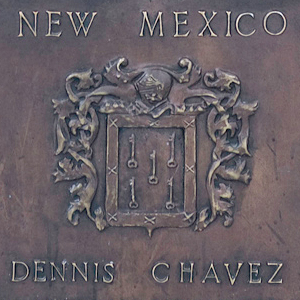
attributed coat of arms of Dennis Chávez

In 1911, Chávez married Imelda Espinosa, a member of a prominent New Mexico family. In 1914, they moved to Belen. The couple had three children: Dennis, Jr., Gloria and Ymelda.

Dennis Chávez died of cancer, attributed to his being a lifelong smoker, in Washington, D.C., on November 18, 1962, and was buried at Mount Calvary Cemetery in Albuquerque, New Mexico. Congress honored his memory with a minute of silence, and then-Vice-President Lyndon B. Johnson spoke at his funeral. At the time of his death, he was fourth-ranking in Senate seniority.

== Legacy ==
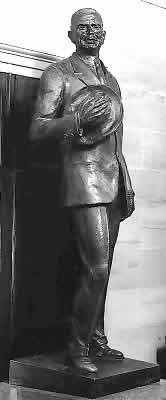
Statue of Dennis Chávez by Felix de Weldon in the National Statuary Hall at the U.S. Capitol.

Chávez, only the second-ever Hispanic member of the U.S. Senate, was the first U.S.-born Hispanic elected to the Senate (Octaviano Larrazolo was born in Mexico). He was also the first person born in New Mexico elected by the state to the Senate. By a large margin, he is the longest-serving Hispanic US senator.

He was honored by the United States Postal Service with a 35¢ Great Americans series (1980–2000) postage stamp.

His daughter, Ymelda Chavez Dixon, wrote a successful women's column for the Washington Evening Star from 1965 to 1981 called "Your Date with Ymelda."

A granddaughter, Gloria Tristani, followed in public service, serving as chair of the New Mexico State Corporations Commission in 1996, as a member of the Federal Communications Commission from 1997 to 2001, and as the Democratic nominee for New Mexico's other U.S. Senate seat in 2002 where she lost to Senator Pete Domenici.

== See also ==
- List of Hispanic and Latino Americans in the United States Congress
- List of members of the United States Congress who died in office (1950–1999)

U.S. House of Representatives
| Preceded by Albert G. Simms | Member of the U.S. House of Representatives from New Mexico's at-large congressional district 1931–1935 | Succeeded by John J. Dempsey |
Party political offices
| Preceded by Jethro Vaught | Democratic nominee for U.S. Senator from New Mexico (Class 1); 1934, 1936, 1940, 1946, 1952, 1958 | Succeeded by Joseph Montoya |
U.S. Senate
| Preceded by Bronson M. Cutting | U.S. Senator (Class 1) from New Mexico; 1935–1962; Served alongside: Carl Hatch, Clinton Anderson | Succeeded by Edwin L. Mechem |
| Preceded by Chapman Revercomb | Chair of the Senate Public Works Committee; 1949–1953 | Succeeded by Ed Martin |
| Preceded by Ed Martin | Chair of the Senate Public Works Committee; 1955–1962 | Succeeded by Patrick V. McNamara |
