= John Morrow (New Mexico politician) =

American politician

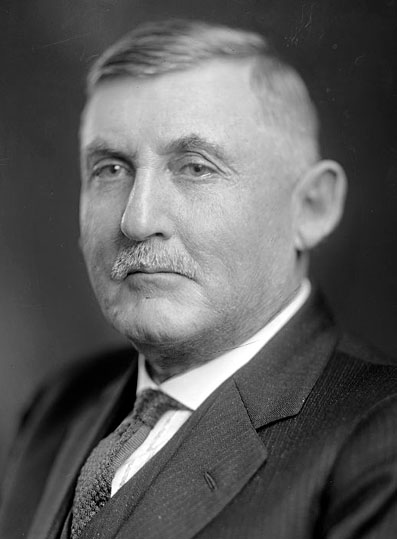

Member of the U.S. House of Representatives from New Mexico's at-large district
- In office March 4, 1923 – March 3, 1929
- Preceded by: Néstor Montoya
- Succeeded by: Albert G. Simms

Member of the New Mexico Territorial House of Representatives
- In office 1897–1898

Personal details
- Born: April 19, 1865 Darlington, Wisconsin, U.S.
- Died: February 25, 1935 (aged 69) Santa Fe, New Mexico, U.S.
- Party: Democratic

John Morrow (April 19, 1865 – February 25, 1935) was an American attorney, politician, businessman, and educator who served as a member of the United States House of Representatives from New Mexico.

== Early life and education ==
He was born near Darlington, Wisconsin, the fifth of nine children born to John Morrow and Ellen McDermott. He attended local public schools and the state normal university.

== Career ==
=== Early career ===
Morrow taught school in Wisconsin, Iowa, Nebraska, and New Mexico. He was the superintendent of public schools of Colfax County, New Mexico in 1892–1896. He studied law and commenced practice in Raton, New Mexico after being admitted to the bar in 1895.

=== Politics ===
Morrow was a member of the New Mexico Territorial House of Representatives in 1897 and 1898 and the city attorney of Raton in 1900 and 1901. He was president of the board of education in 1903–1923. In addition, he was a delegate to the Democratic National Convention in 1908 and a regent of New Mexico Highlands University in Las Vegas, New Mexico (the former state normal institution) from 1921 to 1922. He was elected as a Democrat to the Sixty-eighth, Sixty-ninth, and Seventieth Congresses (March 4, 1923 – March 3, 1929) and was an unsuccessful candidate for re-election in 1928.

=== Later career ===
After leaving Congress, he engaged in banking, had extensive ranch and livestock holdings, and was a large owner of real estate in Raton.

== Death ==
He died in Santa Fe, New Mexico in 1935 and was buried at the Fairmont Cemetery in Raton, New Mexico.

U.S. House of Representatives
Preceded by Néstor Montoya	Member of the U.S. House of Representatives from New Mexico's at-large congressional district 1923–1929	Succeeded by Albert G. Simms
