= John J. Dempsey =

13th Governor of New Mexico

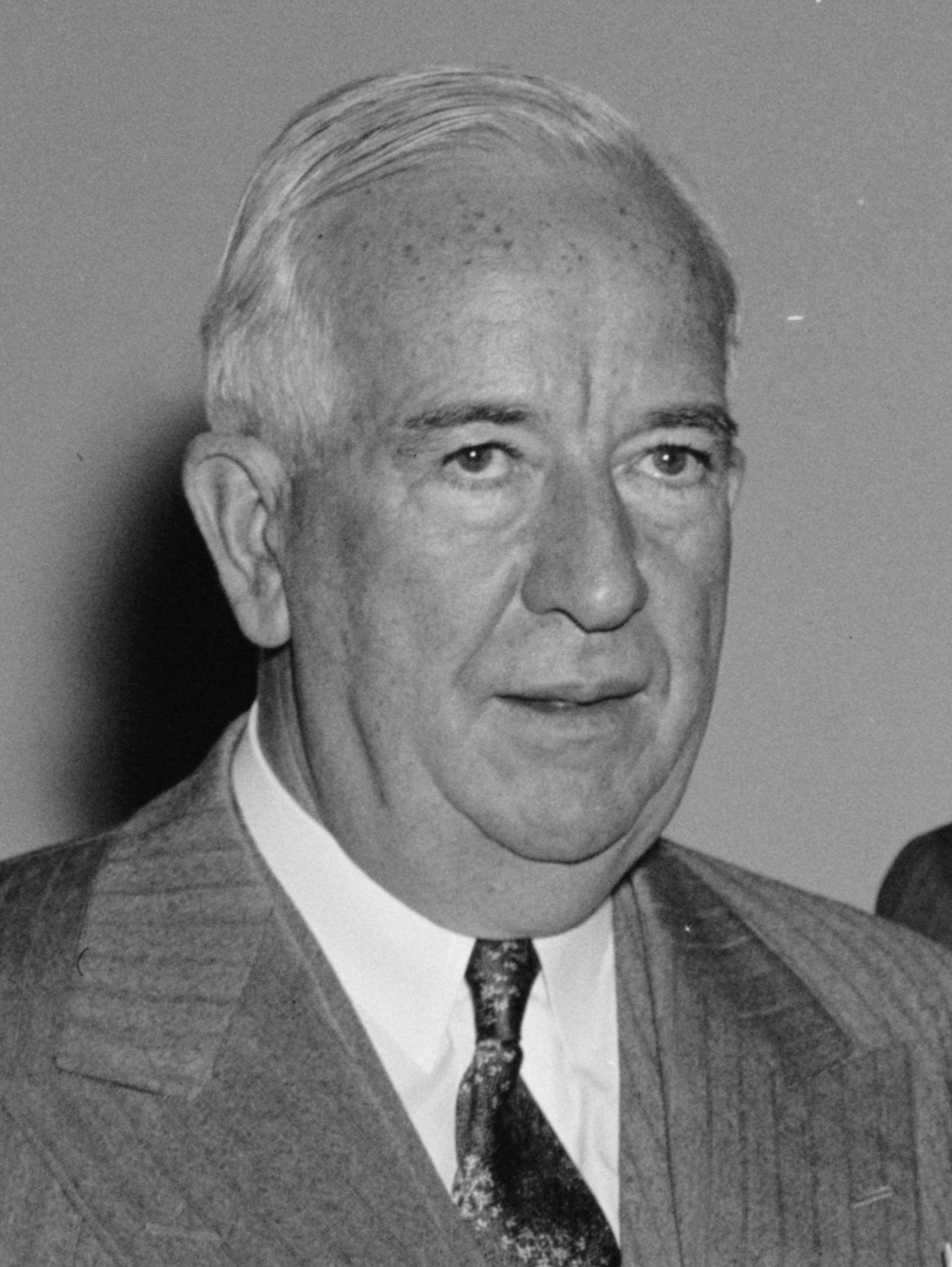
- Dempsey in 1938

13th Governor of New Mexico
- In office January 1, 1943 – January 1, 1947
- Lieutenant: James B. Jones
- Preceded by: John E. Miles
- Succeeded by: Thomas J. Mabry

Member of the U.S. House of Representatives from New Mexico's at-large district
- In office January 3, 1935 – January 3, 1941
- Preceded by: Dennis Chávez
- Succeeded by: Clinton Presba Anderson
- In office January 3, 1951 – March 11, 1958
- Preceded by: John E. Miles
- Succeeded by: Thomas G. Morris

Personal details
- Born: June 22, 1879 White Haven, Pennsylvania, U.S.
- Died: March 11, 1958 (aged 78) Washington, D.C., U.S.
- Party: Democratic
- Spouse(s): Kathryn McCarthy (died), Gladys Everett
- Profession: Petroleum

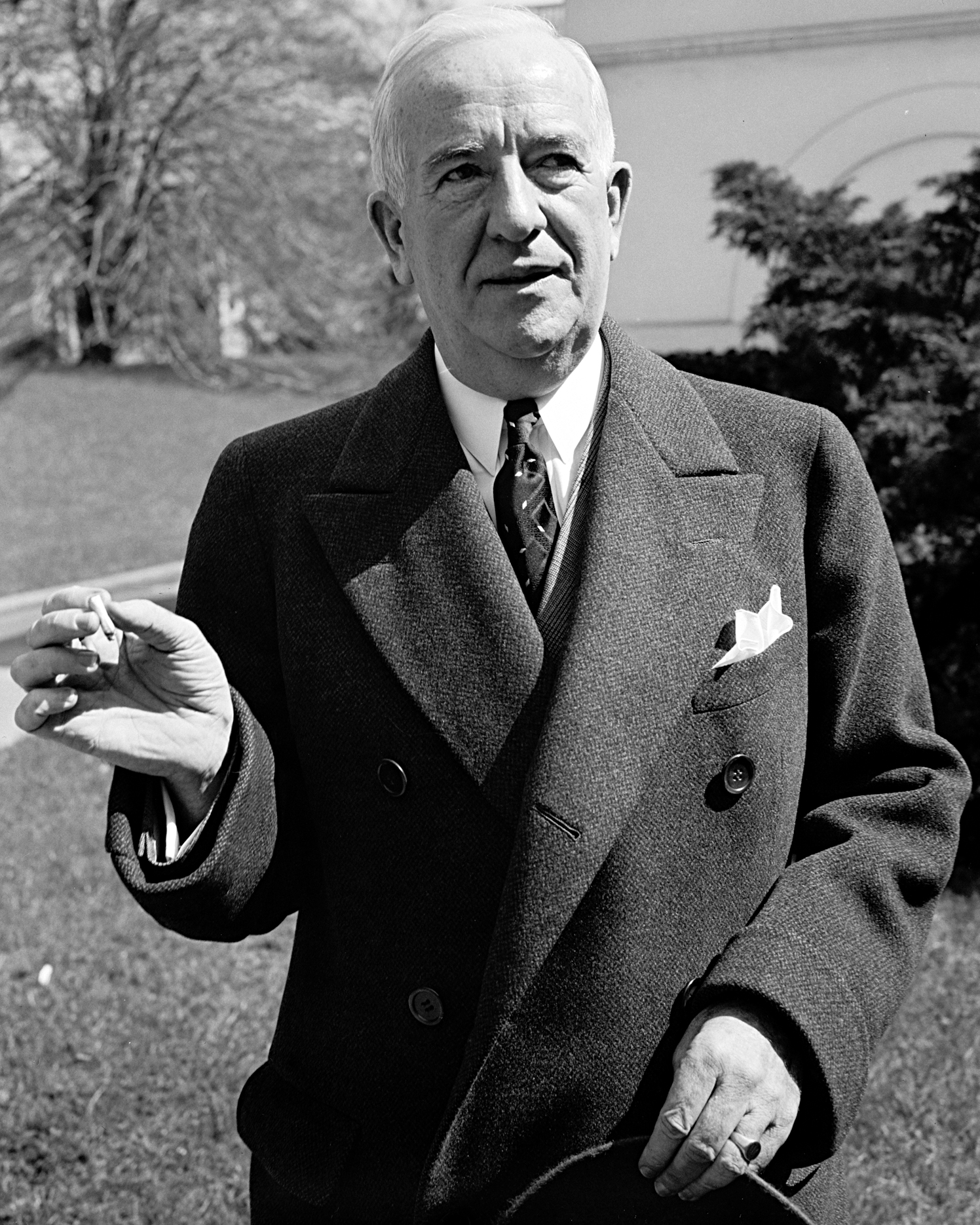
Dempsey in 1939

John Joseph Dempsey (June 22, 1879 – March 11, 1958) was an American politician and United States representative from New Mexico who also served as the 13th governor of New Mexico. He was born in White Haven, Pennsylvania, where he attended grade school. Employed as a telegrapher, he held various positions with the Brooklyn Union Elevator Company. He was the vice president of the Brooklyn Rapid Transit Company until 1919 when he entered the oil business in Oklahoma and became vice president of the Continental Oil and Asphalt Company. He moved to Santa Fe, New Mexico, in 1920 and was an independent oil operator and in 1928 became president of the United States Asphalt Company.

Dempsey in 1932 was appointed a member and later president of the Board of Regents of the University of New Mexico. He served as the state director for the National Recovery Administration in 1933, then became state director of the Federal Housing Administration and the National Emergency Council. He was elected as a Democrat to the Seventy-fourth, Seventy-fifth, and Seventy-sixth Congresses (January 3, 1935 – January 3, 1941) but was not a candidate for renomination in 1940 when he was an unsuccessful candidate for nomination for United States Senator.

Dempsey served as a member of the United States Maritime Commission in 1941. He was the Under Secretary of the Interior from July 7, 1941, until his resignation on June 24, 1942. He was Governor of New Mexico from January 1, 1943, to January 1, 1947 and was an unsuccessful candidate for the Democratic nomination for United States Senator in 1946. He was elected to the Eighty-second and the three succeeding Congresses and served from January 3, 1951, until his death in Washington, D.C., March 11, 1958. He is buried in Rosario Cemetery, Santa Fe, New Mexico.

== See also ==
- List of members of the United States Congress who died in office (1950–1999)
- List of members of the House Un-American Activities Committee

Party political offices
Preceded by John E. Miles	Democratic nominee for Governor of New Mexico; 1942, 1944	Succeeded by Thomas J. Mabry
Political offices
Preceded by John E. Miles	Governor of New Mexico; 1943–1947	Succeeded by Thomas J. Mabry
U.S. House of Representatives
Preceded by Dennis Chavez	Member of the U.S. House of Representatives from New Mexico's at-large congressional district 1935–1941	Succeeded by Clinton P. Anderson
Preceded by John E. Miles	Member of the U.S. House of Representatives from New Mexico's at-large congressional district 1951–1958	Succeeded by Thomas G. Morris
