= 1943 in the United States =

- Decades: 1920s; 1930s; 1940s; 1950s; 1960s
- See also: History of the United States (1918–1945); Timeline of United States history (1930–1949); List of years in the United States

Events from the year 1943 in the United States.

== Incumbents ==
=== Federal government ===
- President: Franklin D. Roosevelt (D-New York)
- Vice President: Henry A. Wallace (D-Iowa)
- Chief Justice: Harlan F. Stone (New York)
- Speaker of the House of Representatives: Sam Rayburn (D-Texas)
- Senate Majority Leader: Alben W. Barkley (D-Kentucky)
- Congress: 77th (until January 3), 78th (starting January 3)

==== State governments ====
Governors and lieutenant governors

=== Governors ===
- Governor of Alabama: Frank M. Dixon (Democratic) (until January 19), Chauncey Sparks (Democratic) (starting January 19)
- Governor of Arizona: Sidney Preston Osborn (Democratic)
- Governor of Arkansas: Homer Martin Adkins (Democratic)
- Governor of California: Culbert Olson (Democratic) (until January 4), Earl Warren (Republican) (starting January 4)
- Governor of Colorado: Ralph Lawrence Carr (Republican) (until January 12), John Charles Vivian (Republican) (starting January 12)
- Governor of Connecticut: Robert A. Hurley (Democratic) (until January 6), Raymond E. Baldwin (Republican) (starting January 6)
- Governor of Delaware: Walter W. Bacon (Republican)
- Governor of Florida: Spessard Holland (Democratic)
- Governor of Georgia: Eugene Talmadge (Democratic) (until January 12), Ellis Arnall (Democratic) (starting January 12)
- Governor of Idaho: Chase A. Clark (Democratic) (until January 4), C. A. Bottolfsen (Republican) (starting January 4)
- Governor of Illinois: Dwight H. Green (Republican)
- Governor of Indiana: Henry F. Schricker (Democratic)
- Governor of Iowa: George A. Wilson (Republican) (until January 14), Bourke B. Hickenlooper (Republican) (starting January 14)
- Governor of Kansas: Payne Ratner (Republican) (until January 11), Andrew F. Schoeppel (Republican) (starting January 11)
- Governor of Kentucky: Keen Johnson (Democratic) (until December 7), Simeon S. Willis (Republican) (starting December 7)
- Governor of Louisiana: Sam H. Jones (Democratic)
- Governor of Maine: Sumner Sewall (Republican)
- Governor of Maryland: Herbert R. O'Conor (Democratic)
- Governor of Massachusetts: Leverett Saltonstall (Republican)
- Governor of Michigan: Murray Van Wagoner (Democratic) (until January 1), Harry Kelly (Republican) (starting January 1)
- Governor of Minnesota: Harold Stassen (Republican) (until April 27), Edward John Thye (Republican) (starting April 27)
- Governor of Mississippi: Paul B. Johnson, Sr. (Democratic) (until December 26), Dennis Murphree (Democratic) (starting December 26)
- Governor of Missouri: Forrest C. Donnell (Republican)
- Governor of Montana: Sam C. Ford (Republican)
- Governor of Nebraska: Dwight Griswold (Republican)
- Governor of Nevada: Edward P. Carville (Democratic)
- Governor of New Hampshire: Robert O. Blood (Republican)
- Governor of New Jersey: Charles Edison (Democratic)
- Governor of New Mexico: John E. Miles (Democratic) (until January 1), John J. Dempsey (Democratic) (starting January 1)
- Governor of New York: Thomas Dewey (Republican) (starting January 1)
- Governor of North Carolina: J. Melville Broughton (Democratic)
- Governor of North Dakota: John Moses (Democratic)
- Governor of Ohio: John W. Bricker (Republican)
- Governor of Oklahoma: Leon C. Phillips (Democratic) (until January 11), Robert S. Kerr (Democratic) (starting January 11)
- Governor of Oregon: Charles A. Sprague (Republican) (until January 11), Earl Snell (Republican) (starting January 11)
- Governor of Pennsylvania: Arthur James (Republican) (until January 19), Edward Martin (Republican) (starting January 19)
- Governor of Rhode Island: J. Howard McGrath (Democratic)
- Governor of South Carolina: Richard Manning Jefferies (Democratic) (until January 19), Olin D. Johnston (Democratic) (starting January 19)
- Governor of South Dakota: Harlan J. Bushfield (Republican) (until January 5), Merrill Q. Sharpe (Republican) (starting January 5)
- Governor of Tennessee: Prentice Cooper (Democratic)
- Governor of Texas: Coke R. Stevenson (Democratic)
- Governor of Utah: Herbert B. Maw (Democratic)
- Governor of Vermont: William H. Wills (Republican)
- Governor of Virginia: Colgate Darden (Democratic)
- Governor of Washington: Arthur B. Langlie (Republican)
- Governor of West Virginia: Matthew M. Neely (Democratic)
- Governor of Wisconsin: Julius P. Heil (Republican) (until January 4), Walter S. Goodland (Republican) (starting January 4)
- Governor of Wyoming: Nels H. Smith (Republican) (until January 4), Lester C. Hunt (Democratic) (starting January 4)

=== Lieutenant governors ===
- Lieutenant Governor of Alabama: Albert A. Carmichael (Democratic) (until January 19), Leven H. Ellis (Democratic) (starting January 19)
- Lieutenant Governor of Arkansas: Robert L. Bailey (Democratic) (until January 12), James Lavesque Shaver (Democratic) (starting January 12)
- Lieutenant Governor of California: Ellis E. Patterson (Democratic) (until January 4), Frederick F. Houser (Republican) (starting January 4)
- Lieutenant Governor of Colorado: John Charles Vivian (Republican) (until January 12), William Eugene Higby (Republican) (starting January 12)
- Lieutenant Governor of Connecticut: Odell Shepard (Democratic) (until January 8), William L. Hadden (Republican) (starting January 8)
- Lieutenant Governor of Delaware: Isaac J. MacCollum (Democratic)
- Lieutenant Governor of Idaho: Charles C. Gossett (Democratic) (until January 4), Edwin Nelson (Republican) (starting January 4)
- Lieutenant Governor of Illinois: Hugh W. Cross (Republican)
- Lieutenant Governor of Indiana: Charles M. Dawson (Democratic)
- Lieutenant Governor of Iowa: Bourke B. Hickenlooper (Republican) (until January 14), Robert D. Blue (Republican) (starting January 14)
- Lieutenant Governor of Kansas: Carl E. Friend (Republican) (until month and day unknown), Jess C. Denious (Republican) (starting month and day unknown)
- Lieutenant Governor of Kentucky: Rodes K. Myers (Democratic) (until December 7), Kenneth H. Tuggle (Republican) (starting December 7)
- Lieutenant Governor of Louisiana: Marc M. Mouton (Democratic)
- Lieutenant Governor of Massachusetts: Horace T. Cahill (Republican)
- Lieutenant Governor of Michigan: Frank Murphy (Democratic) (until January 1), Eugene C. Keyes (Republican) (starting January 1)
- Lieutenant Governor of Minnesota:
  - until January 4: C. Elmer Anderson (Republican)
  - January 4-April 27: Edward John Thye (Republican)
  - April 27-May 6: vacant
  - starting May 6: Archie H. Miller (Republican)
- Lieutenant Governor of Mississippi: Dennis Murphree (Democratic) (until December 26), vacant (starting December 26)
- Lieutenant Governor of Missouri: Frank Gaines Harris (Democratic)
- Lieutenant Governor of Montana: Ernest T. Eaton (Republican)
- Lieutenant Governor of Nebraska: William E. Johnson (Republican) (until month and day unknown), Roy W. Johnson (Republican) (starting month and day unknown)
- Lieutenant Governor of Nevada: Maurice J. Sullivan (Democratic) (until January 3), Vail M. Pittman (Democratic) (starting January 3)
- Lieutenant Governor of New Mexico: Ceferino Quintana (Democratic) (until January 1), James B. Jones (Democratic) (starting January 1)
- Lieutenant Governor of New York:
  - January 1-July 17: Thomas W. Wallace (Republican)
  - starting July 17: Joseph R. Hanley (Republican)
- Lieutenant Governor of North Carolina: Reginald L. Harris (Democratic)
- Lieutenant Governor of North Dakota: Oscar W. Hagen (Republican) (until month and day unknown), Henry Holt (Democratic) (starting month and day unknown)
- Lieutenant Governor of Ohio: Paul M. Herbert (Republican)
- Lieutenant Governor of Oklahoma: James E. Berry (Democratic)
- Lieutenant Governor of Pennsylvania:
  - until January 19: Samuel S. Lewis (Democratic)
  - January 19–20: vacant
  - starting January 20: John C. Bell, Jr. (Republican)
- Lieutenant Governor of Rhode Island: Louis W. Cappelli (Democratic)
- Lieutenant Governor of South Carolina: vacant (until January 19), Ransome Judson Williams (Democratic) (starting January 19)
- Lieutenant Governor of South Dakota: A. C. Miller (Republican)
- Lieutenant Governor of Tennessee: Blan R. Maxwell (Democratic) (until month and day unknown), Joseph H. Ballew (Democratic) (starting month and day unknown)
- Lieutenant Governor of Texas: vacant (until January 19), John Lee Smith (Democratic) (starting January 19)
- Lieutenant Governor of Vermont: Mortimer R. Proctor (Republican)
- Lieutenant Governor of Virginia: William M. Tuck (Democratic)
- Lieutenant Governor of Washington: Victor A. Meyers (Democratic)
- Lieutenant Governor of Wisconsin: Walter S. Goodland (Republican) (until January 4), Oscar Rennebohm (Republican) (starting January 4)

== Events ==
=== January ===
- January 1 – Project Y, the Manhattan Project's secret laboratory at Los Alamos, New Mexico, for development and production of the first atomic bombs under the direction of J. Robert Oppenheimer, begins operations.
- January 4 – Culbert Olson, 29th governor of California, is succeeded by Earl Warren.
- January 11 – The United States and United Kingdom give up territorial rights in China.
- January 14
  - The Casablanca Conference, where Franklin D. Roosevelt becomes the first president of the United States to travel by airplane while in office (Miami, Florida to Morocco to meet with Winston Churchill to discuss World War II).
  - Aircraft carrier USS Independence is commissioned.
- January 15 – The world's largest office building, The Pentagon, headquarters of the Department of War, is dedicated in Arlington, Virginia.
- January 23
  - Duke Ellington plays at New York City's Carnegie Hall for the first time.
  - Critic and commentator Alexander Woollcott suffers an eventually fatal heart attack during a regular broadcast of the CBS Radio roundtable program "People's Platform".

=== February ===
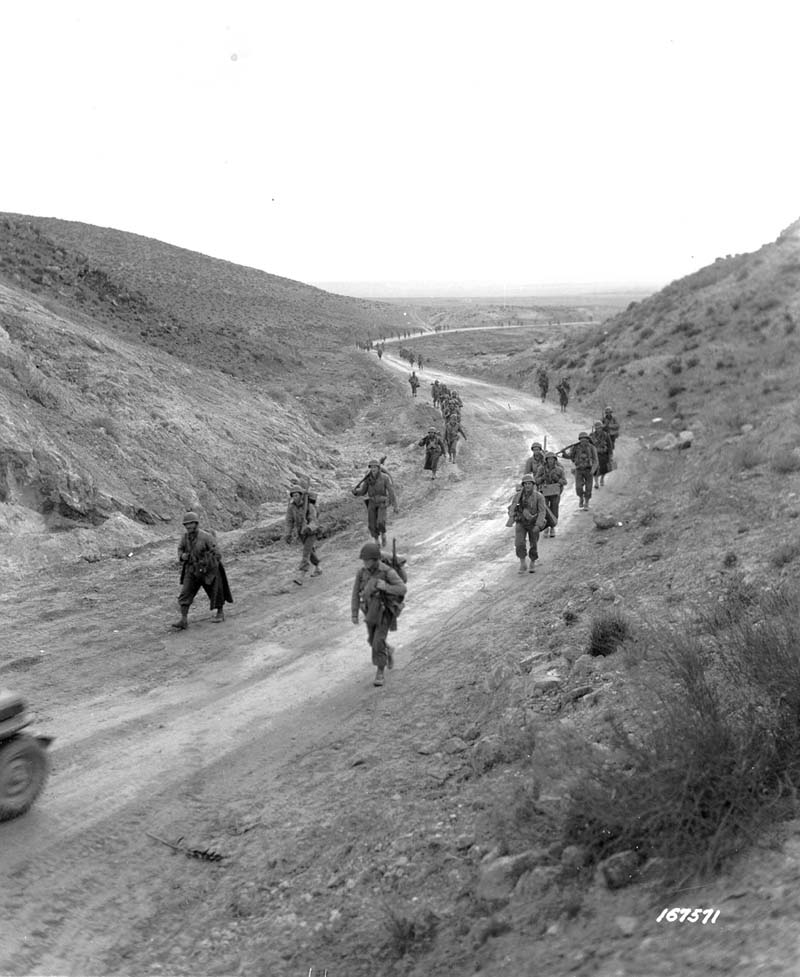
February 19–25: Battle of Kasserine Pass

- February 3 – The legendary Four Chaplains of the U.S. Army are drowned when their ship (Dorchester) is struck by a German torpedo.
- February 5 – Howard Hughes's Western The Outlaw, starring Jane Russell, is released for a week prior to Motion Picture Production Code censors requiring its withdrawal from distribution.
- February 6 – Walt Disney Productions' sixth feature film, Saludos Amigos, is released. It is the first of six package films they would release throughout the remainder of the 1940s.
- February 7 – WWII: It is announced that shoe rationing will go into effect in the US in two days.
- February 8 – WWII: Battle of Guadalcanal – United States forces defeat Japanese troops.
- February 11 – General Dwight D. Eisenhower is selected to command the Allied armies in Europe.
- February 14 – WWII: Battle of the Kasserine Pass – German General Erwin Rommel and his Afrika Korps launch an offensive against Allied defenses in Tunisia; it is the United States' first major battle defeat of the war.
- February 17 – Aircraft carrier USS Lexington is commissioned.
- February 20 – American movie studio executives agree to allow the Office of War Information to censor movies.
- February 25 – Aircraft carrier USS Princeton is commissioned.
- February 27 – Smith Mine disaster: Smith Mine No. 3, a coal mine in Bearcreek, Montana, explodes, killing 74 men.

=== March ===
- March 2 – WWII: Battle of the Bismarck Sea – United States and Australian forces sink Japanese convoy ships.
- March 4 – The 15th Academy Awards, hosted by Bob Hope, are presented at the Ambassador Hotel in Los Angeles, with William Wyler's Mrs. Miniver winning Outstanding Motion Picture. The film also receives 12 and 6 respective nominations and awards, with Wyler also winning Best Director.
- March 8 – WWII: American forces are attacked by Japanese troops on Hill 700 in Bougainville, in a battle that lasts five days.
- March 12 – Aaron Copland's Fanfare for the Common Man is premiered by the Cincinnati Symphony Orchestra.
- March 13 – WWII: On Bougainville, Japanese troops end their assault on American forces at Hill 700.
- March 26 – WWII: Battle of the Komandorski Islands – In the Aleutian Islands, the battle begins when United States Navy forces intercept Japanese troops attempting to reinforce a garrison at Kiska.
- March 31 – Rodgers and Hammerstein's Oklahoma! opens on Broadway, heralds a new era in "integrated" stage musicals, becomes an instantaneous stage classic, and goes on to be Broadway's longest-running musical up to that time (1948).

=== April ===
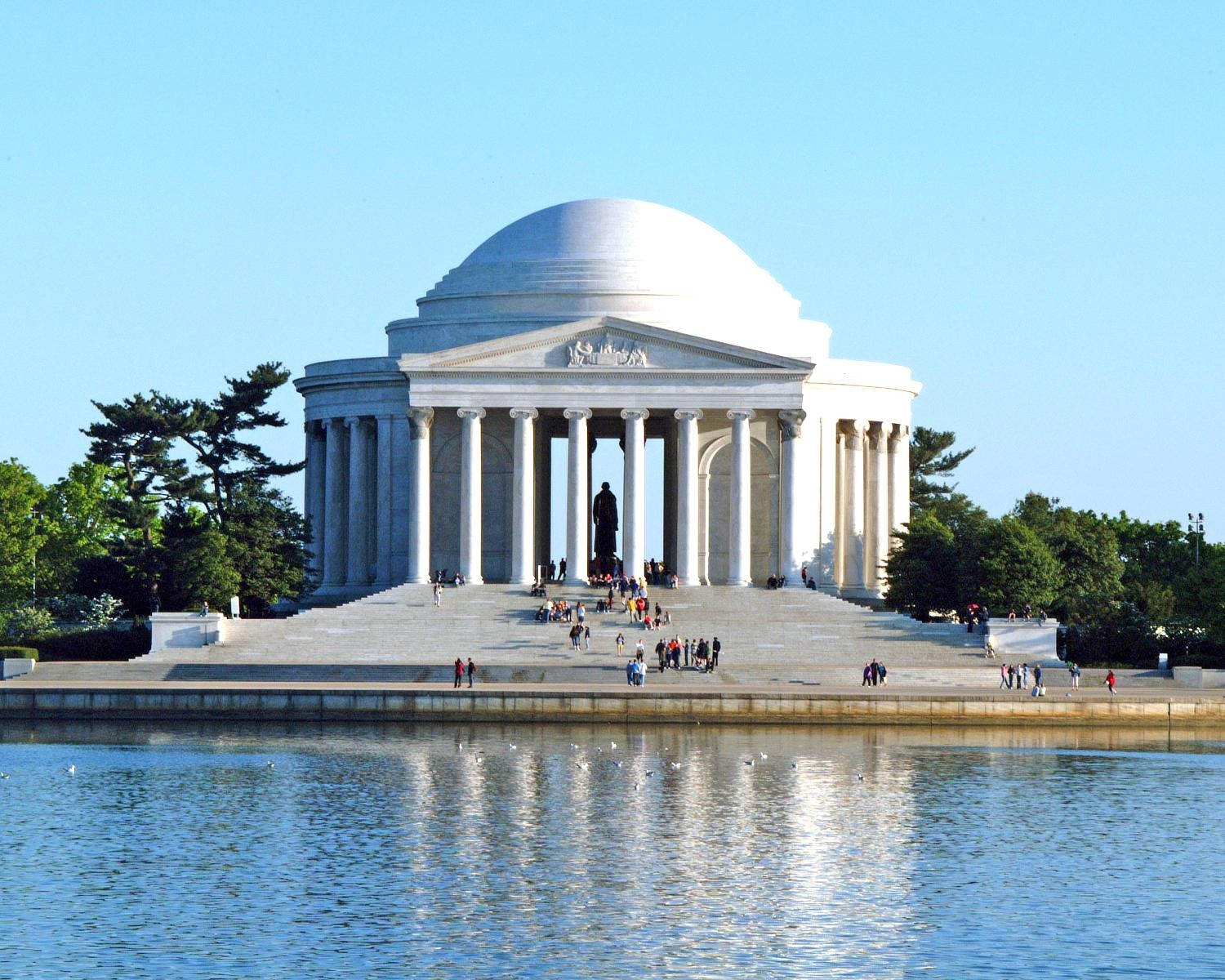
April 13: Jefferson Memorial dedicated

- April 13 – The Jefferson Memorial is dedicated on the 200th anniversary of Thomas Jefferson's birthday. The bronze statue is added in 1947.
- April 24 – Ammunition ship SS El Estero catches fire in New York Harbor threatening the explosion of 5,000 tons of ammunition but is towed clear and sunk.
- April 27 – The U.S. Federal Writers' Project is shuttered.

=== May ===
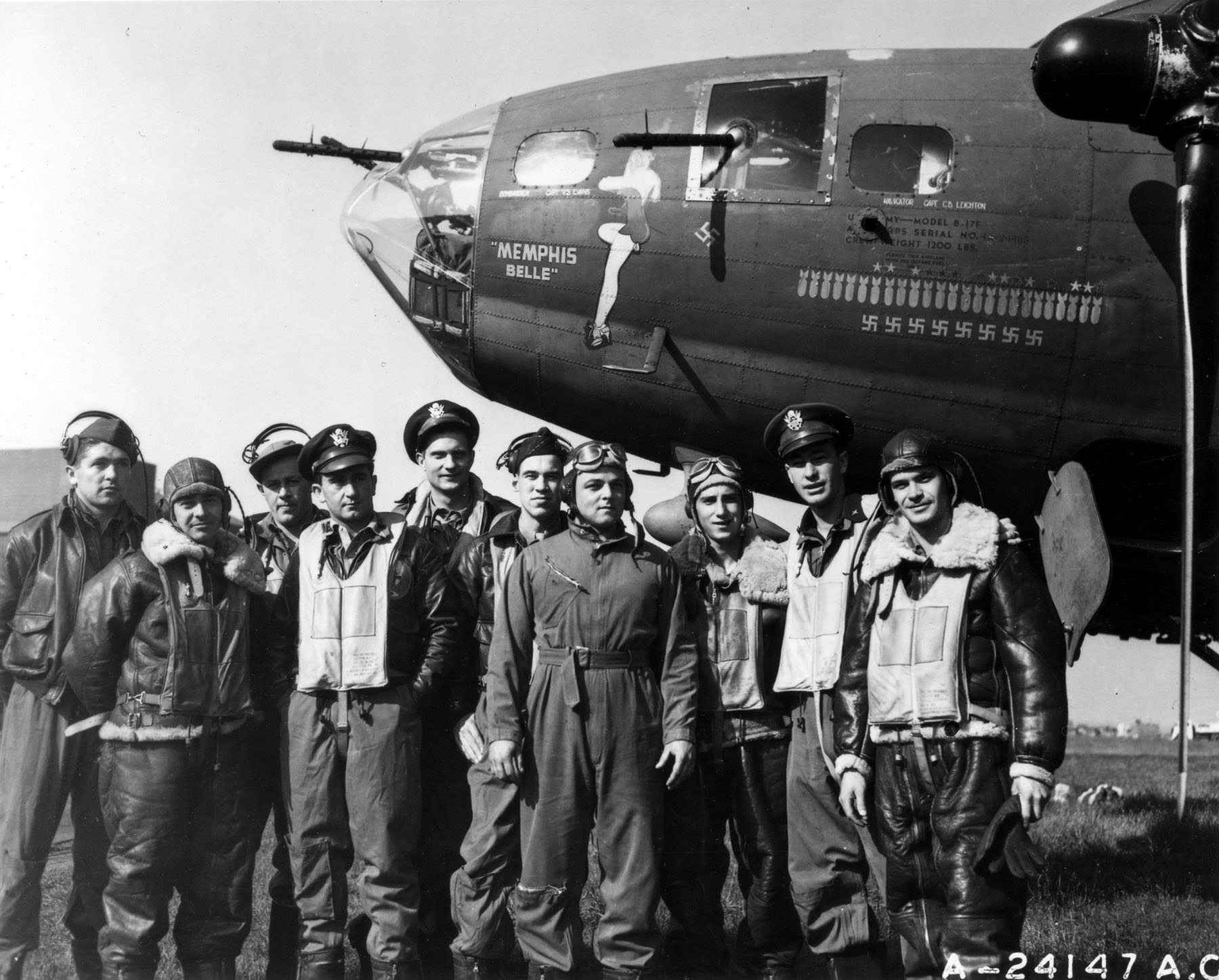
May 17: The Memphis Belle completes its 25th mission

- May 11 – WWII: American troops invade Attu in the Aleutian Islands, in an attempt to expel occupying Japanese forces.
- May 12 – The Trident Conference begins in Washington, D.C., with Franklin D. Roosevelt and Winston Churchill taking part.
- May 17
  - The United States Army contracts with the University of Pennsylvania's Moore School to develop the computer ENIAC.
  - The Memphis Belle becomes the first airplane in the 8th Air Force to complete a 25-mission tour of duty.
- May 19 – Winston Churchill addresses a joint session of the U.S. Congress.
- May 23 – Aircraft carrier USS Bunker Hill is commissioned.
- May 30 – Prelude to the Zoot Suit Riots in Los Angeles.

=== June ===
- June 3–8 – Zoot Suit Riots: U.S. servicemen in Los Angeles attack young Mexican Americans on the ostensible grounds that the latter's generously cut zoot suits are offensive at a time of austerity.
- June 6 – The first game of the All-American Girls Professional Baseball League is played, a precursor of professional women's sports in the U.S.
- June 15–17 – Beaumont race riot of 1943 in Texas.
- June 20–22 – 1943 Detroit race riot.
- June 22 – The U.S. Army 45th Infantry Division lands in North Africa, prior to training at Arzew, French Algeria.

=== July ===
- July 6 – WWII: Americans and Japanese fight the Battle of Kula Gulf off Kolombangara.
- July 10 – WWII: Allied invasion of Sicily – The Allied invasion of Axis-controlled Europe begins with landings on the island of Sicily off mainland Italy, by the U.S. Army 45th Infantry Division and a number of Allied paratroopers.
- July 11 – United States Army forces assault the village of Piano Lupo, just outside Gela, Sicily.
- July 21 – Release of the musical film Stormy Weather starring Lena Horne, "Bojangles" Bill Robinson, Cab Calloway, the Nicholas Brothers and other African American performers.
- July 24
  - WWII: Operation Gomorrah begins: British and Canadian airplanes bomb Hamburg by night, those of the Americans by day. By the end of the operation in November, 9,000 tons of explosives will have killed more than 30,000 people and destroyed 280,000 buildings.
  - Aircraft carrier USS Cabot is commissioned.

=== August ===
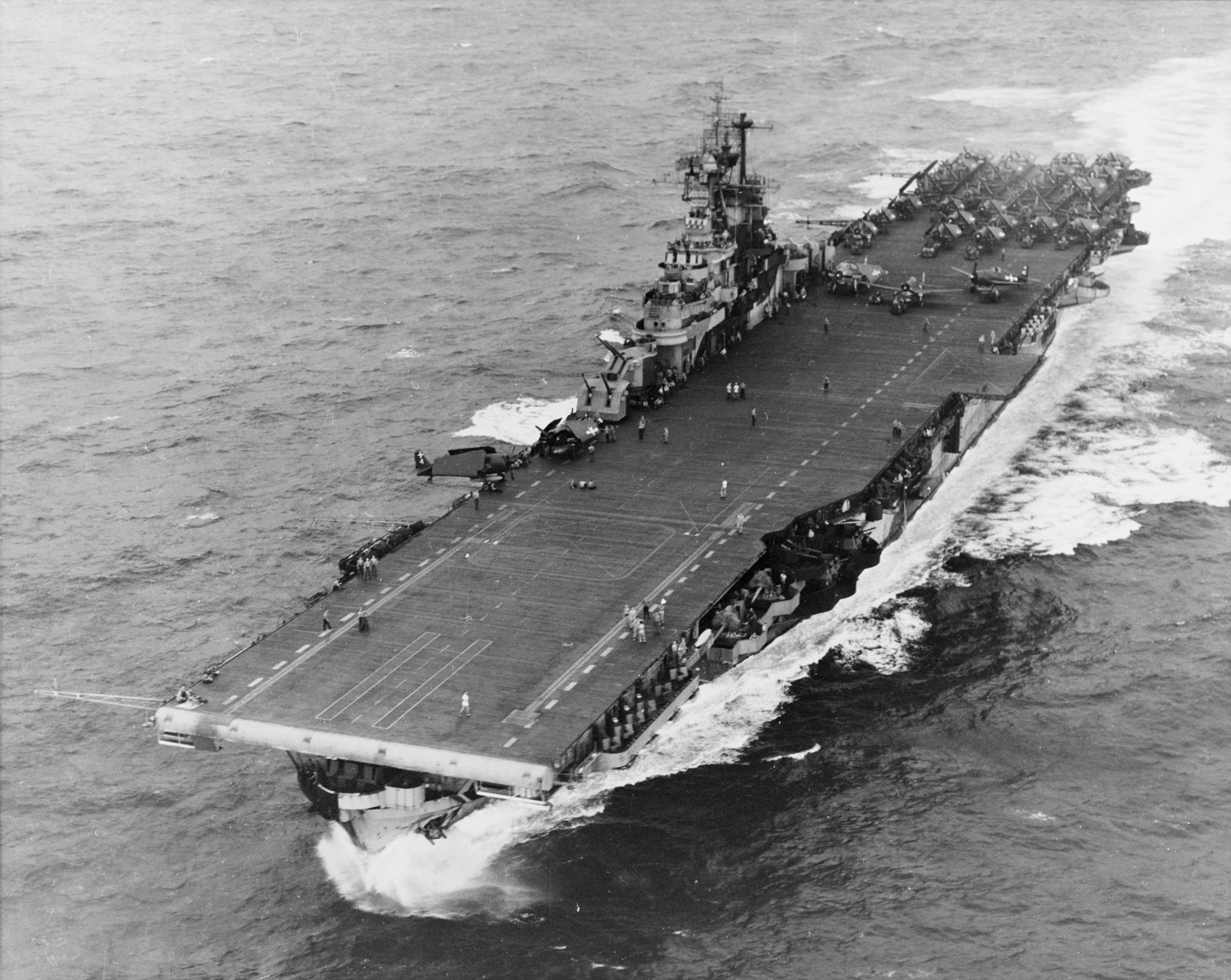
August 16: The USS Intrepid is commissioned

- August 1 – WWII: Operation Tidal Wave – 177 B-24 Liberator bombers from the U.S. Army Air Force bomb oil refineries at Ploieşti, Romania.
- August 1–2 – Harlem riot of 1943, a race riot.
- August 3 – WWII: John F. Kennedy's patrol torpedo boat PT-109 is rammed by a destroyer.
- August 5 – WWII: John F. Kennedy and crew are found by Solomon Islanders coastwatchers Biuku Gasa and Eroni Kumana with their dugout canoe.
- August 6 – WWII: Battle of Vella Gulf – Americans defeat a Japanese convoy off Kolombangara, as the U.S. Army drives the Japanese out of Munda airfield on New Georgia.
- August 14 – WWII: The Quadrant Conference begins in Quebec City; Canadian Prime Minister MacKenzie King meets with Winston Churchill and Franklin D. Roosevelt.
- August 16 – WWII: Aircraft carrier USS Intrepid is commissioned.
- August 17 – WWII: The US 7th Army under General George S. Patton arrives in Messina, Sicily, followed several hours later by the British 8th Army under Field Marshal Bernard L. Montgomery, thus completing the Allied conquest of Sicily.
- August 30 – The Lackawanna Limited train wreck at Wayland in upstate New York causes 29 deaths and injures 114 others.

=== September ===
- September 5 – WWII: The 503rd Parachute Regiment under American General Douglas MacArthur lands and occupies Nadzab, just east of the port city of Lae in northeastern Papua New Guinea.
- September 7 – The Gulf Hotel fire in Houston, Texas, kills 55 people.
- September 8 – United States General Dwight D. Eisenhower publicly announces the surrender of Italy to the Allies.

=== October ===
- October 1 – WWII: American forces enter liberated Naples.
- October 6 – WWII: Americans and Japanese fight the naval Battle of Vella Lavella.
- October 11 – The New York Yankees defeat the St. Louis Cardinals, 4 games to 1, to win their 10th World Series Title in baseball.
- October 12 – The American Broadcasting Company (ABC) begins radio broadcasting.
- October 28 – The alleged date of the Philadelphia Experiment, in which the U.S. destroyer escort USS Eldridge was to be rendered invisible to human observers for a brief period.
- October 30 – The Merrie Melodies animated short Falling Hare, one of the few shorts with Bugs getting out-smarted, is released in the United States.

=== November ===
November 22: Cairo Conference

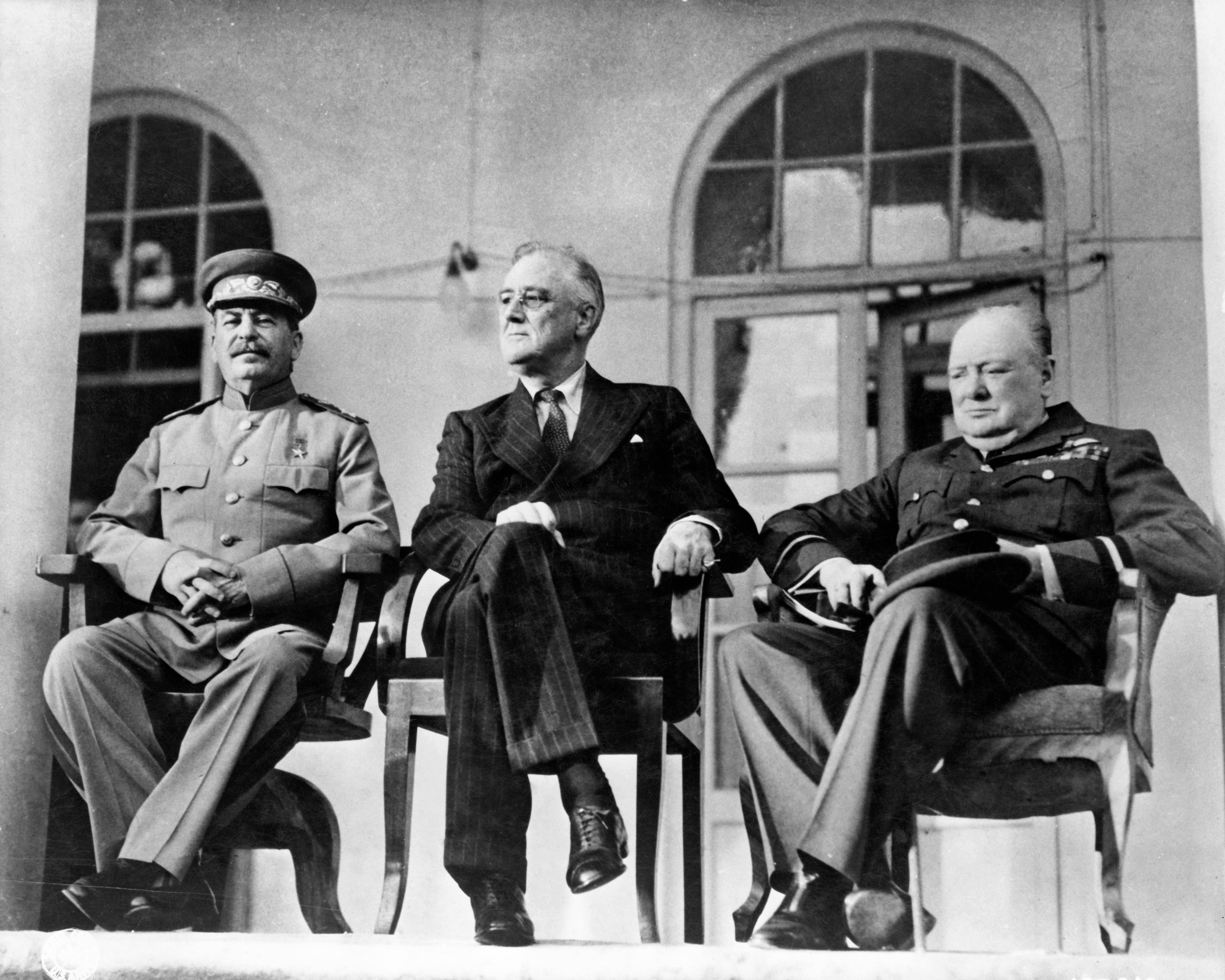
November 28: Tehran Conference

- November 1 – WWII – Operation Goodtime: United States Marines land on Bougainville in the Solomon Islands.
- November 2 – WWII: In the early morning hours, American and Japanese ships fight the inconclusive Battle of Empress Augusta Bay off Bougainville.
- November 14 – Leonard Bernstein, substituting at the last minute for ailing principal conductor Bruno Walter, directs the New York Philharmonic in its regular Sunday afternoon broadcast concert over CBS Radio. The event receives front-page coverage in The New York Times the following day.
- November 16
  - WWII: After flying from Britain, 160 American bombers strike a hydro-electric power facility and heavy water factory in German-controlled Vemork, Norway.
  - WWII: A Japanese submarine sinks the surfaced U.S. submarine USS Corvina near Truk.
- November 17 – Aircraft carrier USS Bataan is commissioned
- November 20 – WWII: Battle of Tarawa – United States Marines land on Tarawa and Makin atolls in the Gilbert Islands and take heavy fire from Japanese shore guns.
- November 22 – WWII: War in the Pacific – U.S. President Franklin D. Roosevelt, British Prime Minister Winston Churchill, and ROC leader Chiang Kai-shek meet in Cairo, Egypt, to discuss ways to defeat Japan.
- November 25 – WWII: Americans and Japanese fight the naval Battle of Cape St. George between Buka and New Ireland.
- November 28 – WWII – Tehran Conference: U.S. President Franklin D. Roosevelt, British Prime Minister Winston Churchill and Soviet leader Joseph Stalin meet in Tehran to discuss war strategy (on November 30 they establish an agreement concerning a planned June 1944 invasion of Europe codenamed Operation Overlord).
- November 29 – WWII: Aircraft carrier USS Hornet is commissioned.

=== December ===
- December 2 – Fifteen atomic scientists, including Soviet spy Klaus Fuchs, arrive from Britain to join the US atomic research project.
- December 3 – Edward R. Murrow delivers his classic "Orchestrated Hell" broadcast over CBS Radio, describing a Royal Air Force nighttime bombing raid on Berlin.
- December 4 – The Great Depression officially ends in the United States: With unemployment figures falling fast due to World War II-related employment, U.S. President Franklin D. Roosevelt closes the Works Progress Administration.
- December 15 – Aircraft carrier USS San Jacinto is commissioned.
- December 24 – WWII: U.S. General Dwight D. Eisenhower becomes the Supreme Allied Commander in Europe.

=== Ongoing ===
- World War II, U.S. involvement (1941–1945)

== Births ==
=== January ===
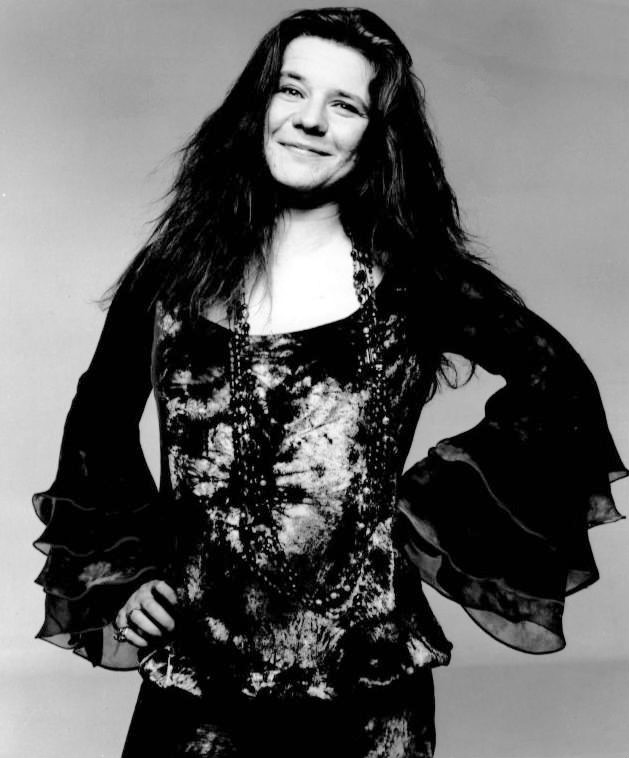
Janis Joplin

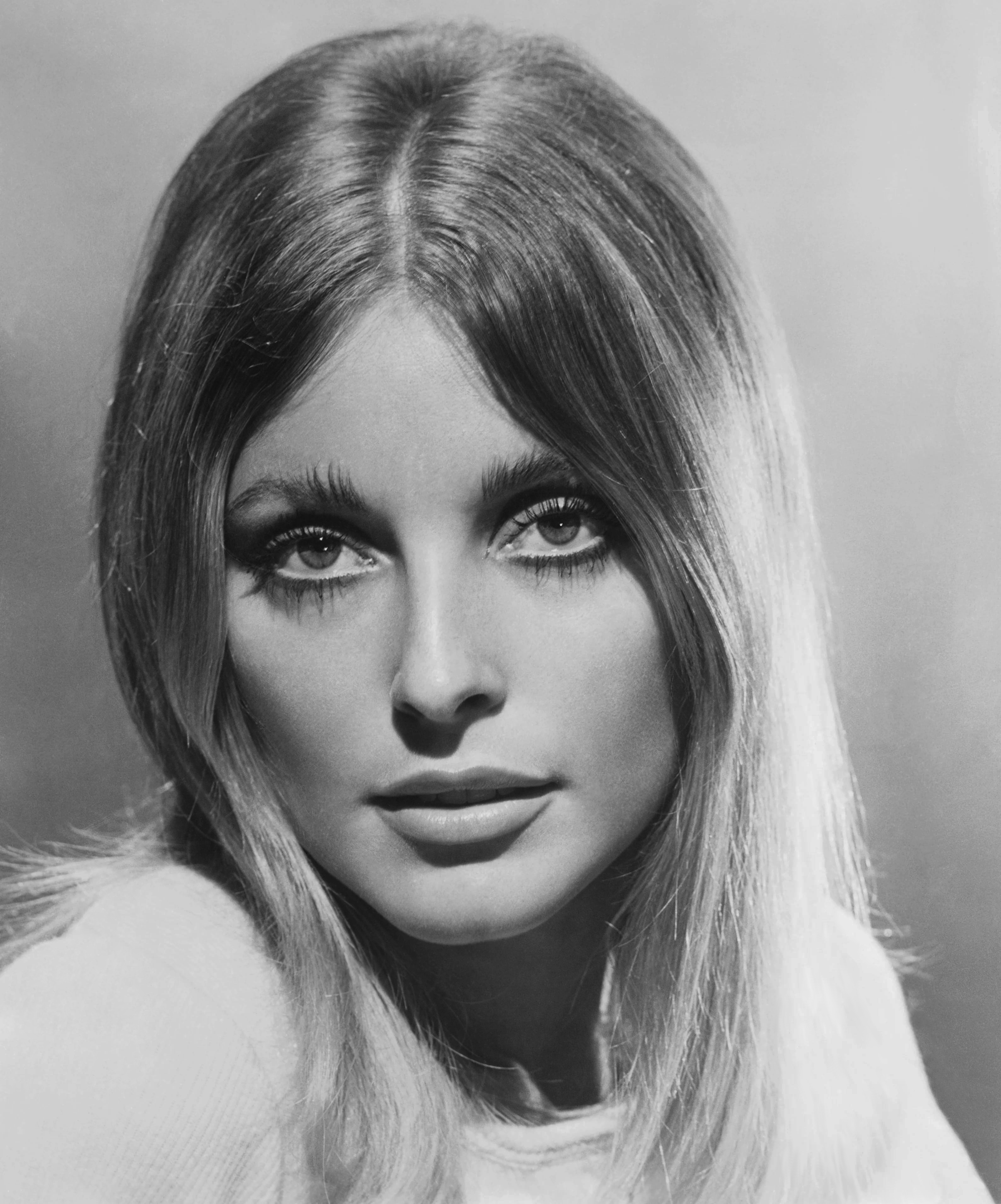
Sharon Tate

- January 1
  - Jerilyn Britz, American golfer
  - Stanley Kamel, American actor (died 2008)
  - Don Novello, American comedian, screenwriter and producer
  - Ronald Perelman, American businessman and philanthropist, founder of MacAndrews & Forbes
- January 3 – Adrian Garrett, American baseball player (died 2021)
- January 4 – Doris Kearns Goodwin, American writer
- January 8
  - Jimmy Elledge, American country musician (d. 2012)
  - Charles Murray, American political scientist and author
- January 9 – Scott Walker, singer and composer (d. 2019 in the United Kingdom)
- January 10
  - Jim Croce, American surburbia musician (d. 1973)
  - Richard S. Hamilton, American mathematician (d. 2024)
- January 11 – Jim Hightower, American radio host, author
- January 13 – Richard Moll, American actor (d. 2023)
- January 14
  - Charles W. Daniels, judge (d. 2019)
  - Holland Taylor, actress
- January 16 – Peter T. Snowe, American politician, businessman (d. 1973)
- January 18 – Kay Granger, American politician
- January 19 – Janis Joplin, American rock singer (d. 1970)
- January 23
  - Gary Burton, American vibraphone player and composer
  - Gil Gerard, American actor and producer
- January 24
  - Janice Raymond, American second-wave feminist activist
  - Sharon Tate, American actress and model (d. 1969)
- January 25 – Tobe Hooper, American film director (d. 2017)
- January 28 – John Beck, American actor

=== February ===
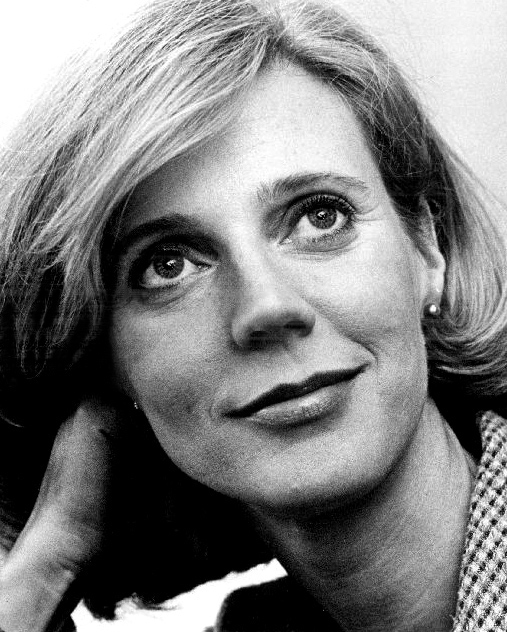
Blythe Danner

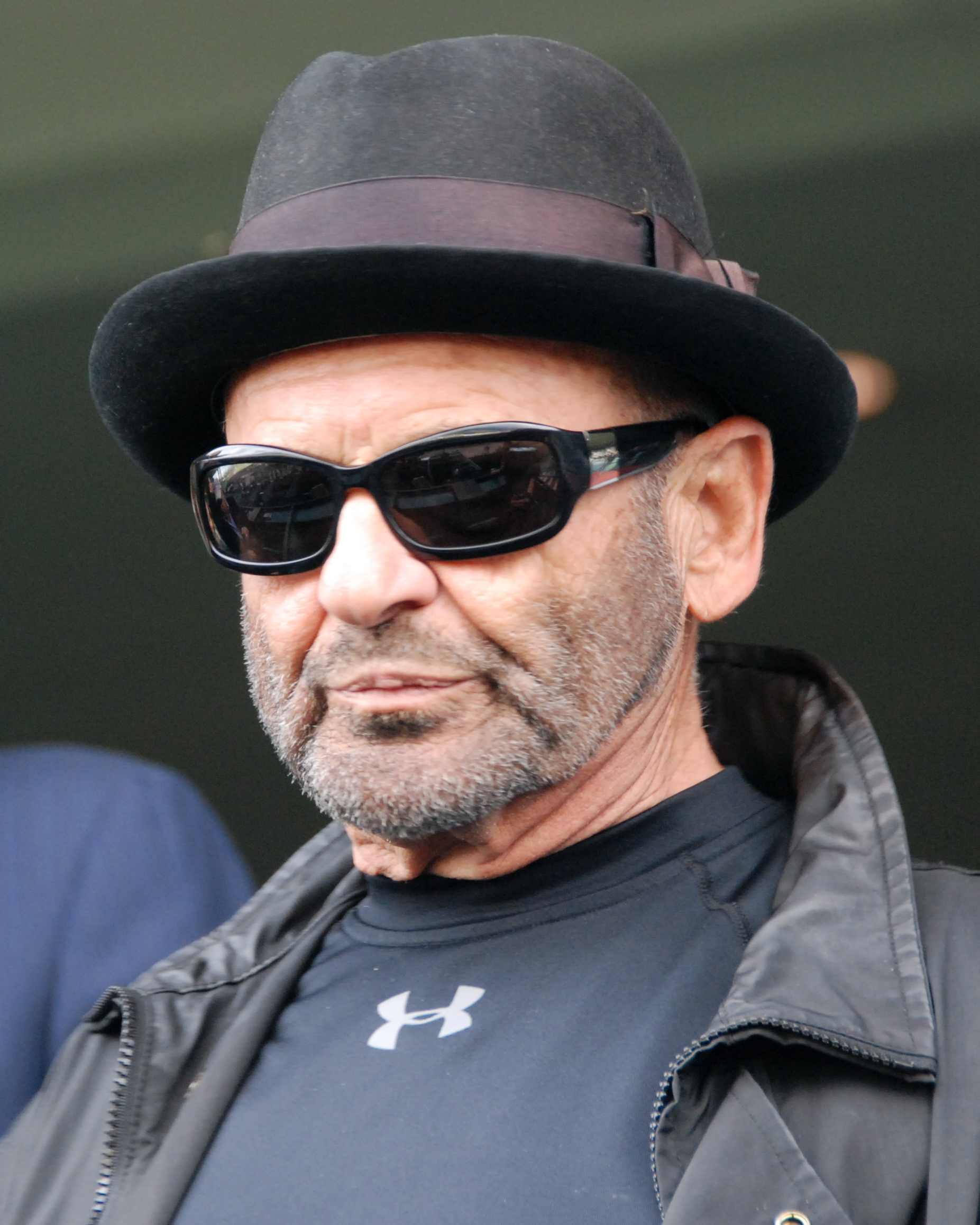
Joe Pesci

- February 3
  - Blythe Danner, American actress
  - Dennis Edwards, American soul, R&B singer (d. 2018)
- February 5
  - Nolan Bushnell, American video game pioneer
  - Michael Mann, American film director, writer, and producer
  - Craig Morton, American football player
- February 6 – C. Boyden Gray, American lawyer and diplomat (d. 2023)
- February 8 – Creed Bratton, American actor
- February 9
  - Joe Pesci, actor
  - Joseph Stiglitz, economist, Nobel Prize laureate
- February 10
  - Walter B. Jones Jr., American politician (d. 2019)
  - Bill Laskey, American football player (died 2022)
- February 14
  - Eric Andersen, singer-songwriter
  - Maceo Parker, musician (James Brown, P-Funk)
- February 19 – Homer Hickam, American author, retired NASA engineer
- February 20 – Moshe Cotel, American composer, pianist (d. 2008)
- February 21 – David Geffen, American record executive, film producer
- February 22 – Dick Van Arsdale, American basketball player (died 2024)
- February 23 – Fred Biletnikoff, American football player, coach
- February 24
  - Kent Haruf, novelist (d. 2014)
  - Terry Semel, businessman
- February 26
  - Bill Duke, American actor, director
  - Bob Hite – American singer, musician (Canned Heat) (d. 1981)
- February 27 – Morten Lauridsen, American composer
- February 28 – Donnie Iris, American rock singer, guitarist (The Jaggerz, Wild Cherry, Donnie Iris and the Cruisers)

=== March ===
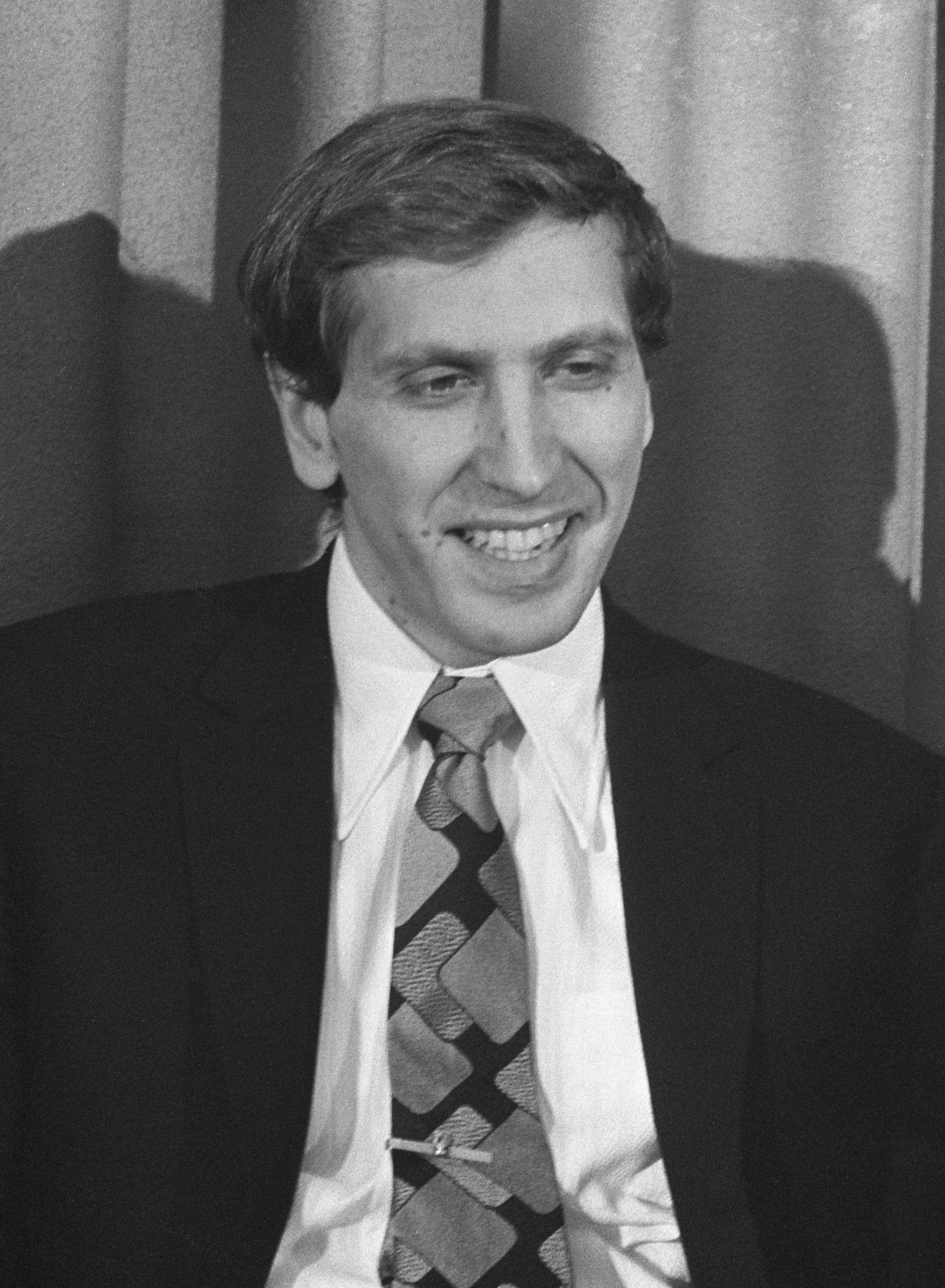
Bobby Fischer

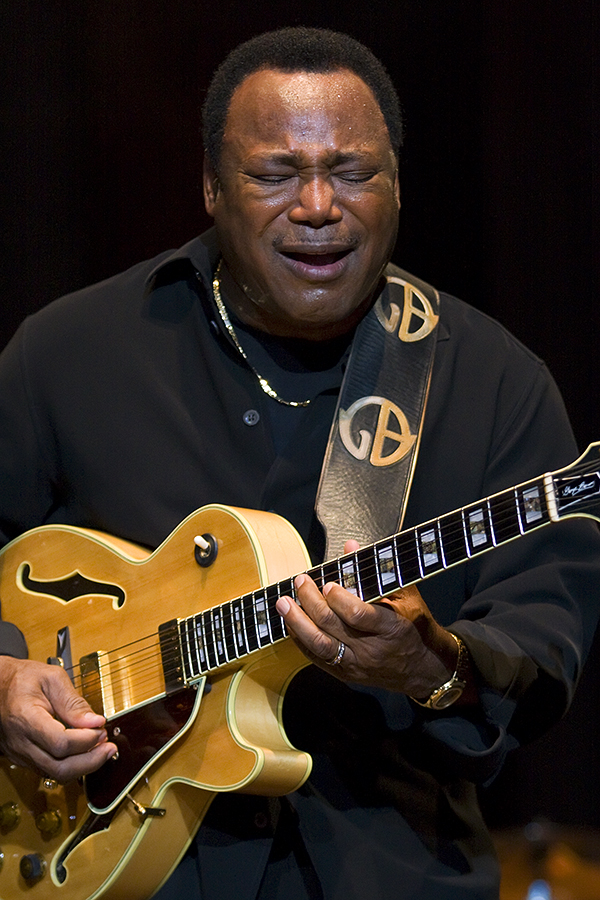
George Benson

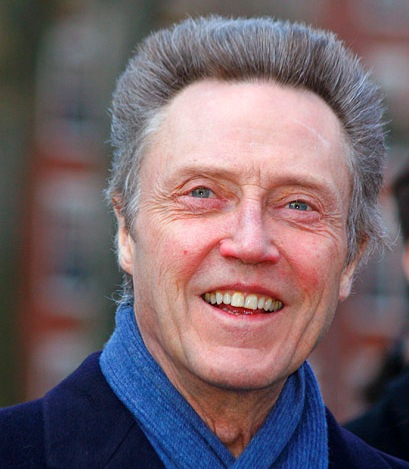
Christopher Walken

- March 1
  - Gil Amelio, American entrepreneur
  - Richard H. Price, American physicist
- March 2 – Peter Straub, American author (d. 2022)
- March 7 – Rick Redman, American football player (d. 2022)
- March 9
  - Bobby Fischer, American chess player (d. 2008 in Iceland)
  - Charles Gibson, American television journalist
- March 12 – Nosson Tzvi Finkel (Mir), Chicago-born Israeli rabbi (d. 2011 in Israel)
- March 14
  - Anita Morris, American actress, singer and dancer (d. 1994)
  - Leroy "Sugarfoot" Bonner, American guitarist (Ohio Players) (d. 2013)
- March 15 – Sly Stone, African-American singer (Sly and the Family Stone) (d. 2025)
- March 16 – Helen Armstrong, American violinist (d. 2006)
- March 18
  - Kevin Dobson, American actor (d. 2020)
  - Lowrell Simon, American singer (d. 2018)
- March 20
  - Gerard Malanga, American poet, photographer
  - Douglas Tompkins, American conservationist, businessman (d. 2015)
- March 22 – George Benson, African-American guitarist, singer and songwriter
- March 23
  - Lee May, American baseball player (d. 2017)
  - Sharon Presley, American author and academic (d. 2022)
- March 25 – Paul Michael Glaser, American actor
- March 26 – Bob Woodward, American journalist
- March 27 – Bob Carr, American politician and lawyer (d. 2024)
- March 28 – Conchata Ferrell, American actress (d. 2020)
- March 30
  - Jay Traynor, American singer (Jay and the Americans) (d. 2014)
  - Dennis Etchison, American author and editor (d. 2019)
- March 31 – Christopher Walken, American actor

=== April ===
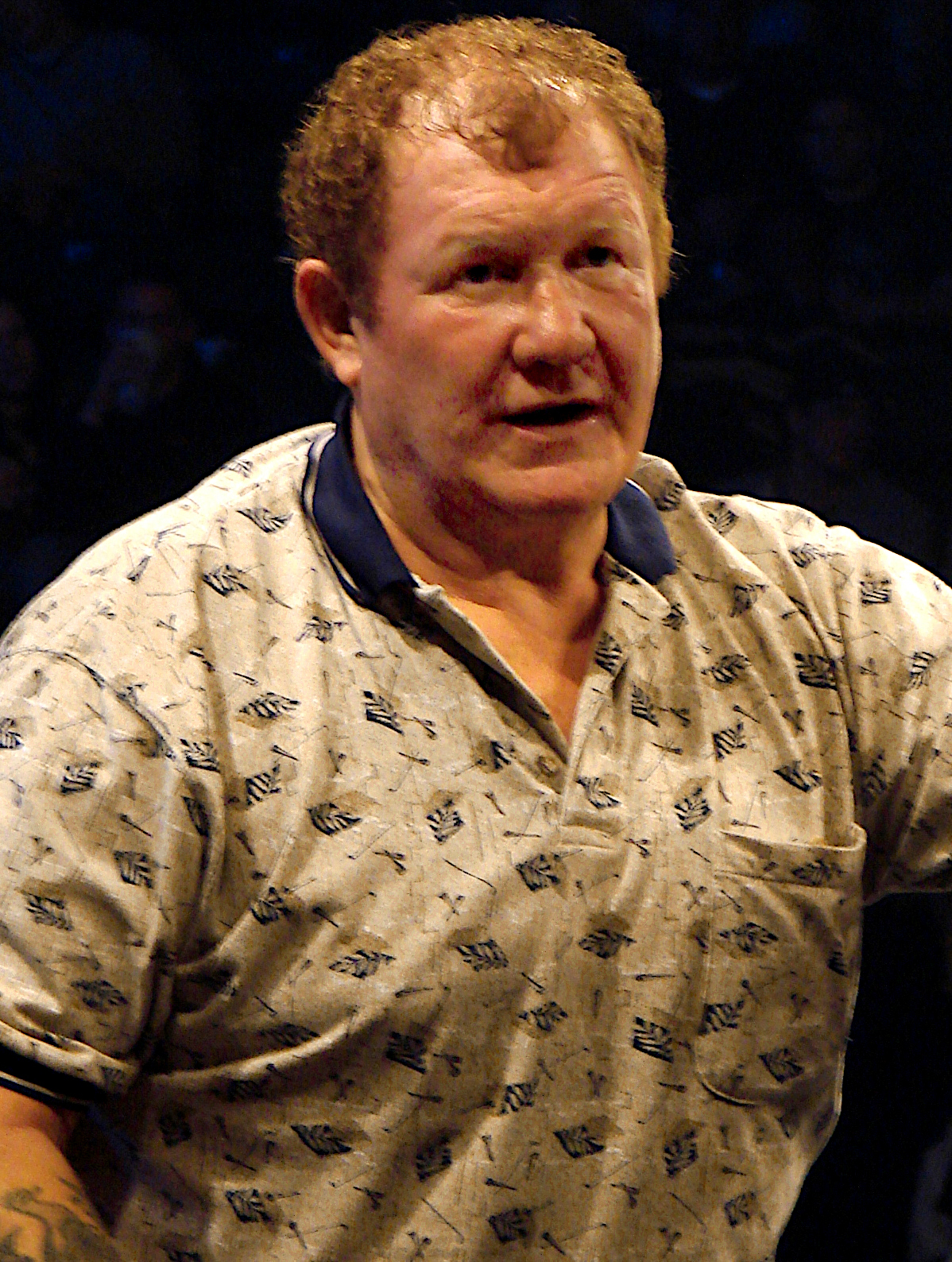
Harley Race

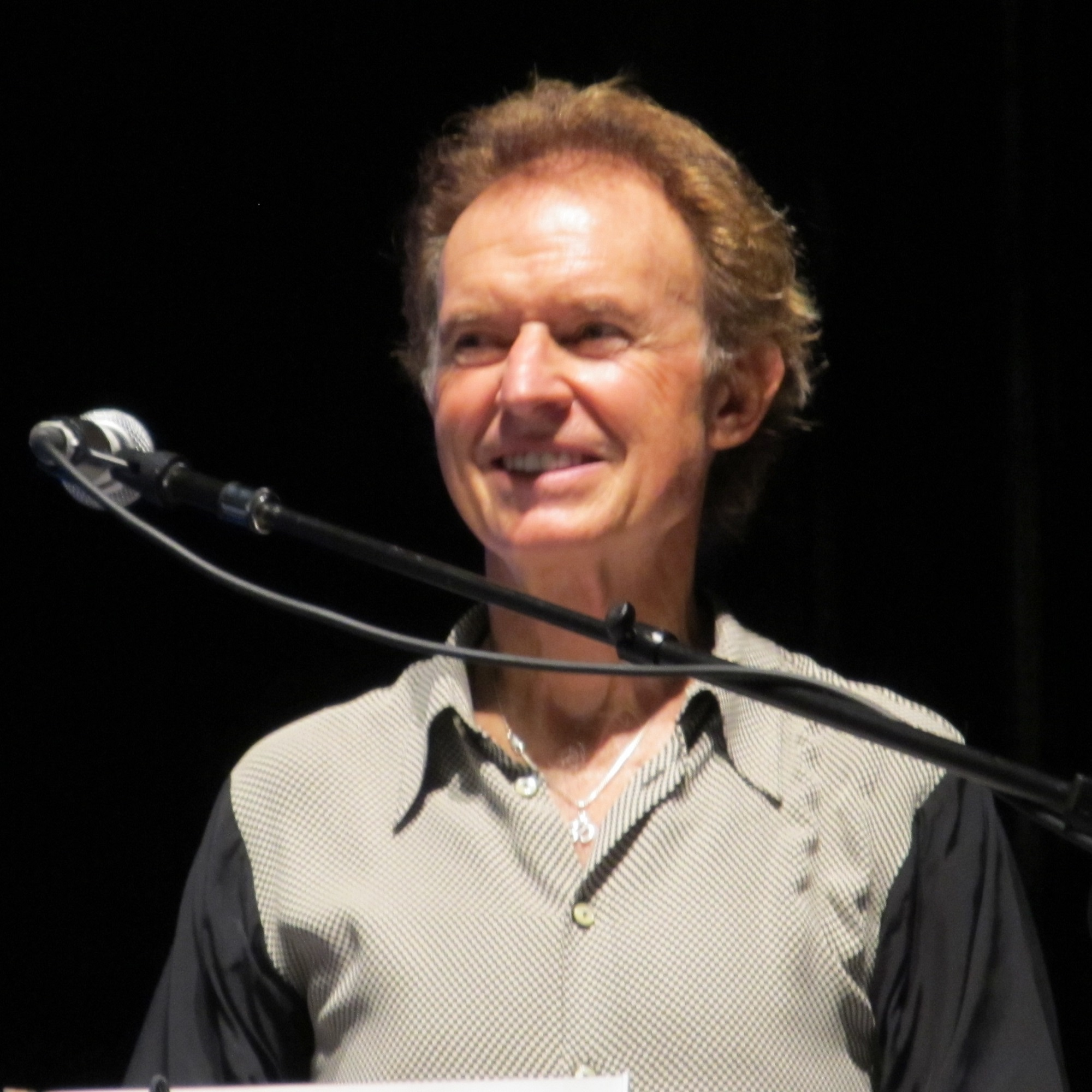
Gary Wright

- April 4 – Judy Buenoano, American serial killer (d. 1998)
- April 5 – Max Gail, American actor (Barney Miller)
- April 6 − Susan Tolsky, American actress and voice actress (d. 2022)
- April 8
  - Miller Farr, American football player (d. 2023)
  - Jack O'Halloran, American boxer and actor
- April 11 – Harley Race, American professional wrestler, promoter and trainer (d. 2019)
- April 12 – Robert Durst, real estate heir and convicted murderer (d. 2022)
- April 15 – Mighty Sam McClain, singer, songwriter (d. 2015)
- April 20 – Edie Sedgwick, model and actress (died 1971)
- April 21 – Jim Jamieson, golfer (d. 2018)
- April 22 – Louise Glück, poet, 12th US Poet Laureate and 2020 Nobel Prize laureate (d. 2023)
- April 24 – Richard Sterban, singer (The Oak Ridge Boys)
- April 25
  - Alan Feduccia, paleornithologist
  - Lew Krausse Jr., baseball player (d. 2021)
- April 26 – Gary Wright, singer, songwriter, musician and composer (d. 2023)
- April 28 – John Oliver Creighton, astronaut
- April 30 – Bobby Vee, pop singer (d. 2016)

=== May ===
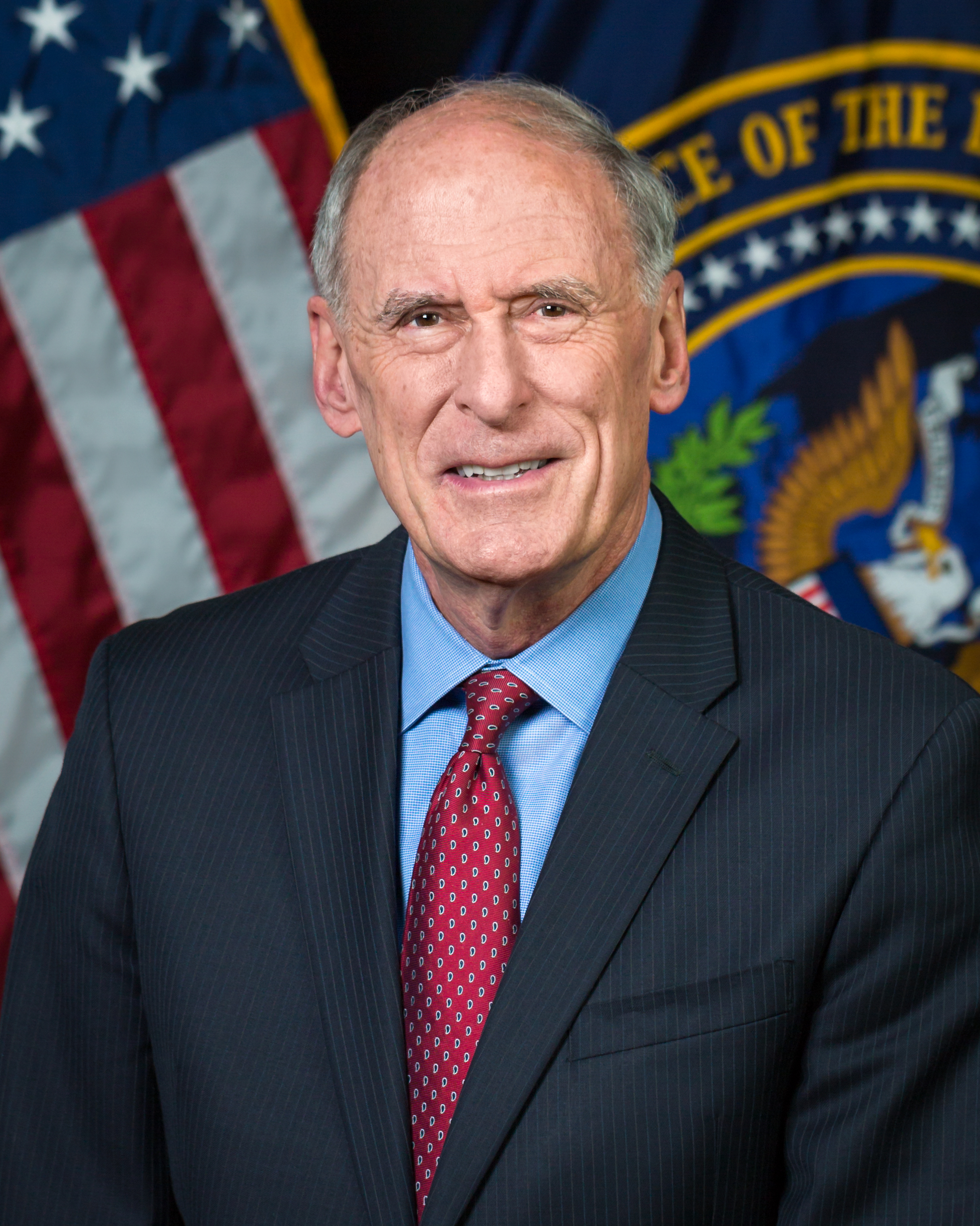
Dan Coats

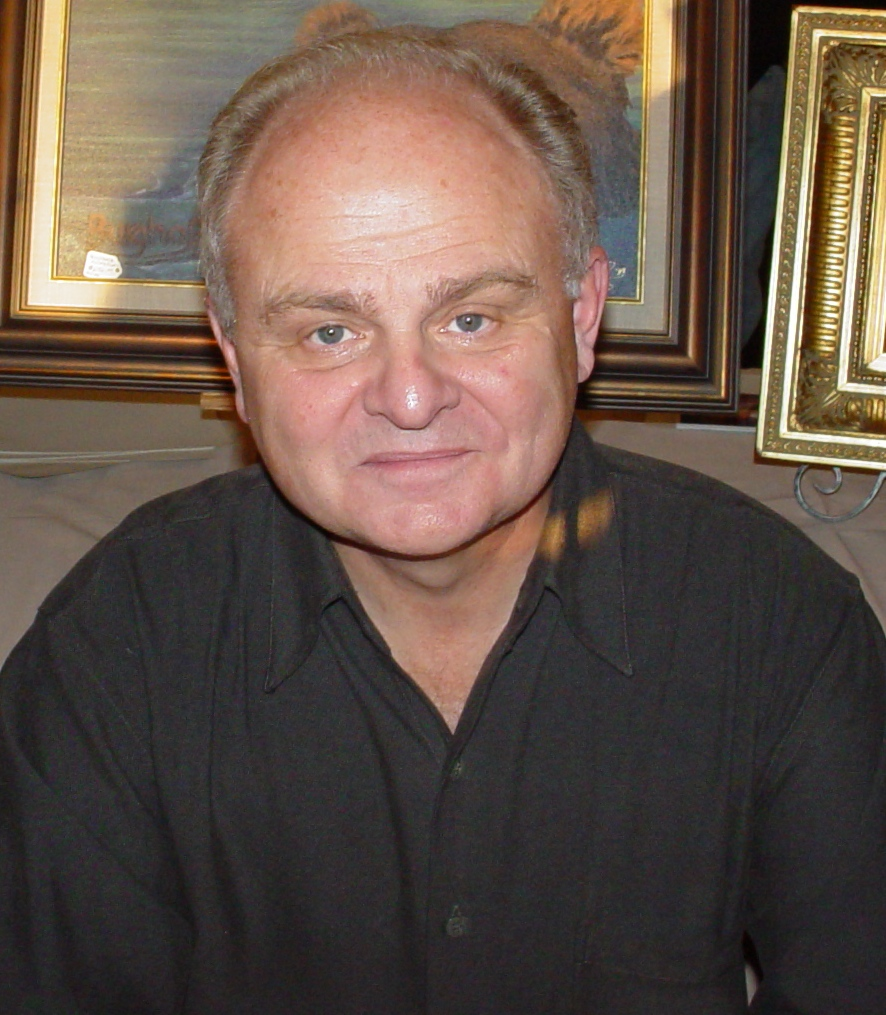
Gary Burghoff

- May 3 – Jim Risch, American politician
- May 5
  - Raymond A. Jordan, American politician (d. 2022)
  - Billie Moore, American basketball coach (d. 2022)
- May 6 – James Kallstrom, American FBI officer (d. 2021)
- May 7 – Thelma Houston, African-American disco singer
- May 8 – Danny Whitten, American musician (d. 1972)
- May 10
  - Richard Darman, American federal government official, businessman (d. 2008)
  - Judith Jamison, African-American dancer and choreographer (d. 2024)
- May 11
  - Clarence Ellis, American computer scientist and academic (d. 2014)
  - Matthew Lesko, American author
- May 12 – Linda Dano, American actress and author
- May 13 – Frederic Parke, American computer graphics researcher and academic
- May 16
  - Hank Adams, American native rights activist (d. 2020)
  - Dan Coats, American politician
- May 17 – Mark W. Olson, American economist, politician (d. 2018)
- May 21 – Shannon Wilcox, American actress (d. 2023)
- May 22
  - Walt Hriniak, American baseball player and coach
  - Tommy John, American baseball player (d. 2026)
- May 23 – Jim Mueller, American sportscaster (d. 2022)
- May 24 – Gary Burghoff, American actor (M*A*S*H)
- May 25 – Jessi Colter, American singer, composer
- May 27 – Bruce Weitz, American actor
- May 30 – James Chaney, African-American civil rights worker (d. 1964)
- May 31
  - Sharon Gless, American actress
  - Joe Namath, American football player

=== June ===
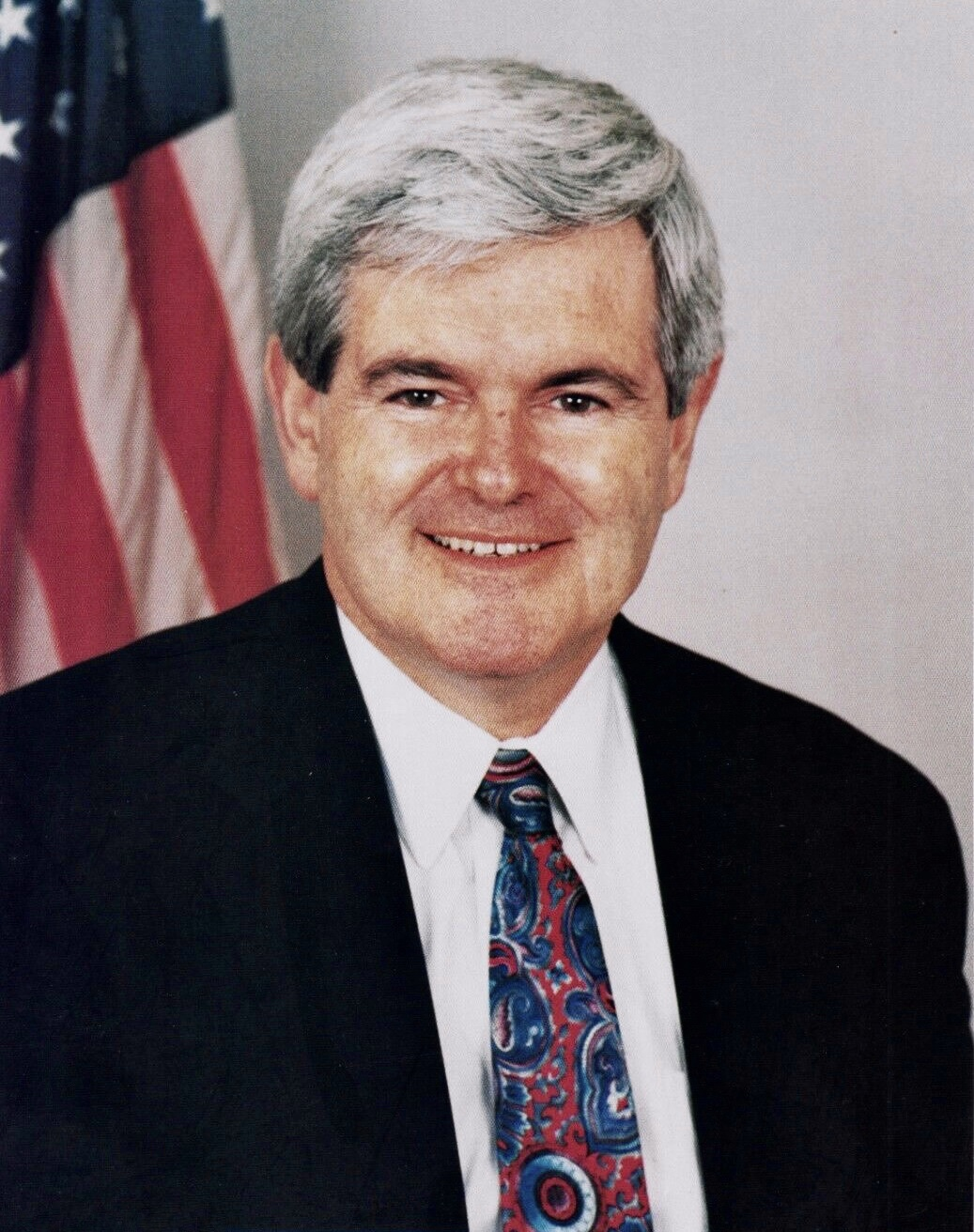
Newt Gingrich

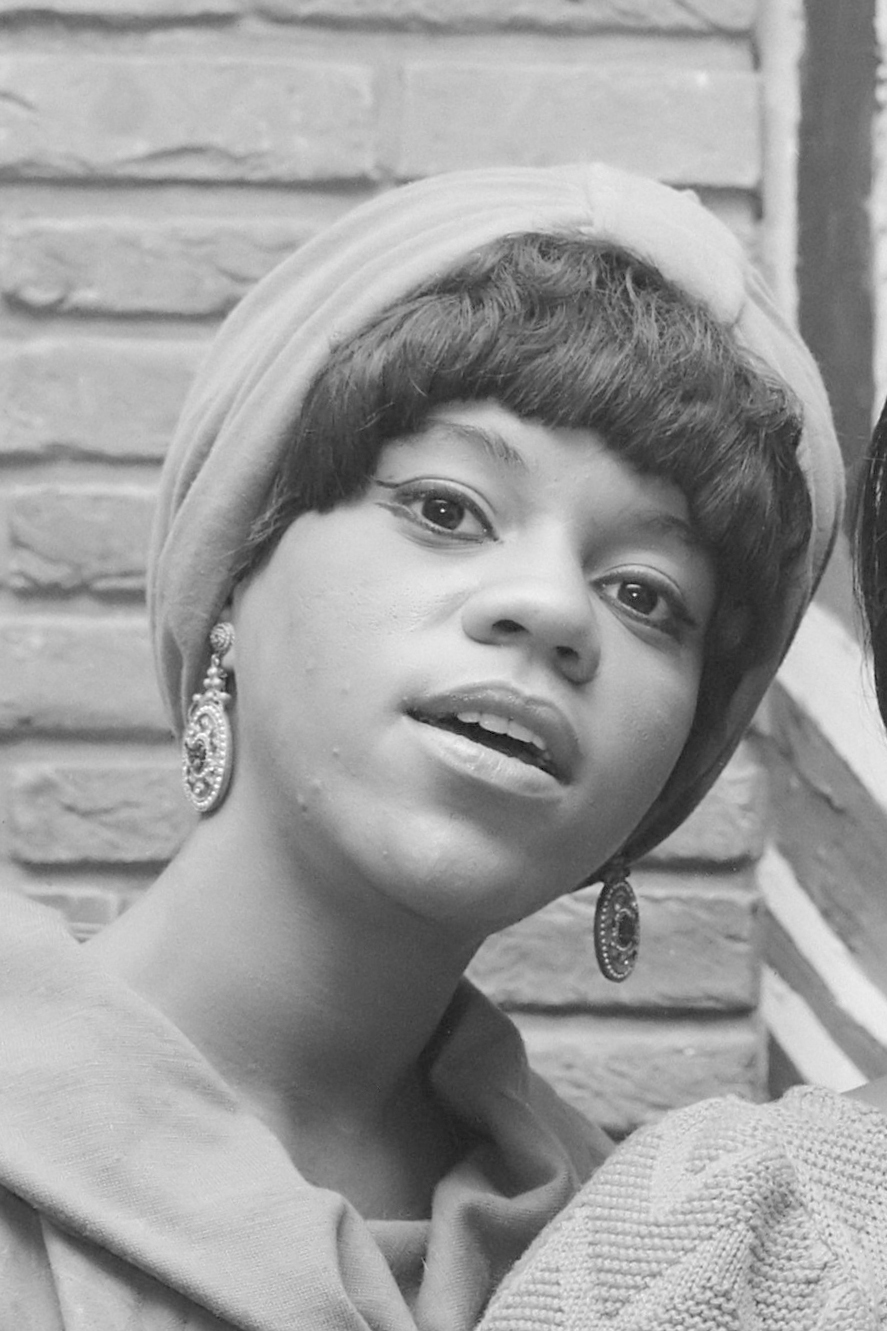
Florence Ballard

- June 1 – Richard Goode, American pianist
- June 6
  - Ken Hatfield, American football player and coach
  - Richard Smalley, American chemist, Nobel Prize laureate (d. 2005)
- June 7
  - Nikki Giovanni, African-American poet, writer, commentator, activist and educator (d. 2024)
  - Mel Levine, American lawyer and politician
  - "Superstar" Billy Graham, pro wrestler (d. 2023)
- June 8 – William Calley, American army officer and war criminal (d. 2024)
- June 11 – Henry Hill, American gangster (d. 2012)
- June 14 – Jim Sensenbrenner, American politician
- June 16 – Joan Van Ark, American actress
- June 17
  - Newt Gingrich, American politician, author and historian
  - Barry Manilow, American pop musician
- June 18 – Peter Courtney, American politician (d. 2024)
- June 23
  - Vint Cerf, American Internet pioneer
  - James Levine, American conductor (d. 2021)
- June 25 – Carly Simon, American singer-songwriter
- June 26
  - John Beasley, American actor (d. 2023)
  - Warren Farrell, American educator, activist and author on gender issues
- June 27 – Rico Petrocelli, American baseball player
- June 29 – Gene Littles, American basketball player and coach (d. 2021)
- June 30 – Florence Ballard, African-American singer, founder of The Supremes (d. 1976)

=== July ===
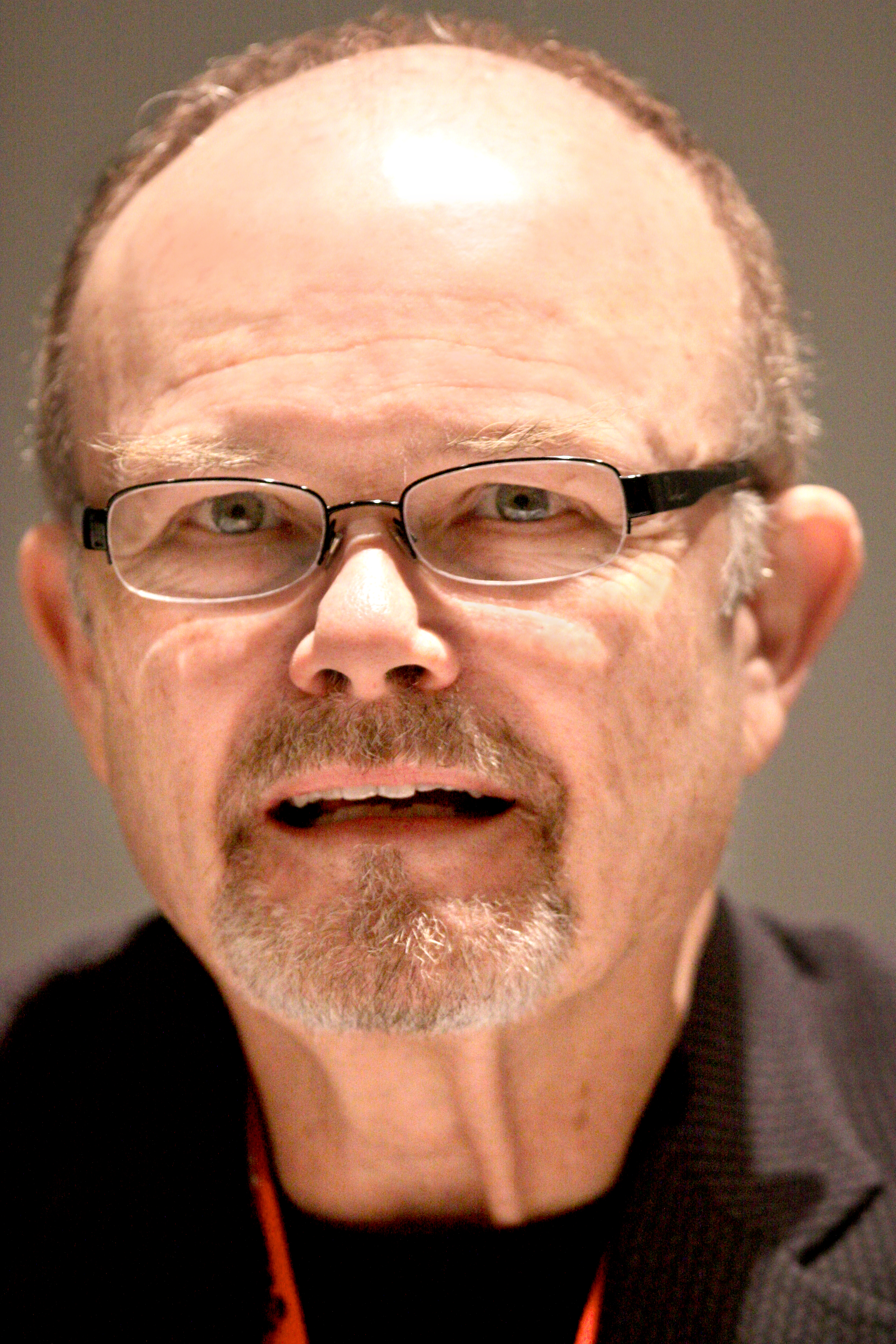
Kurtwood Smith

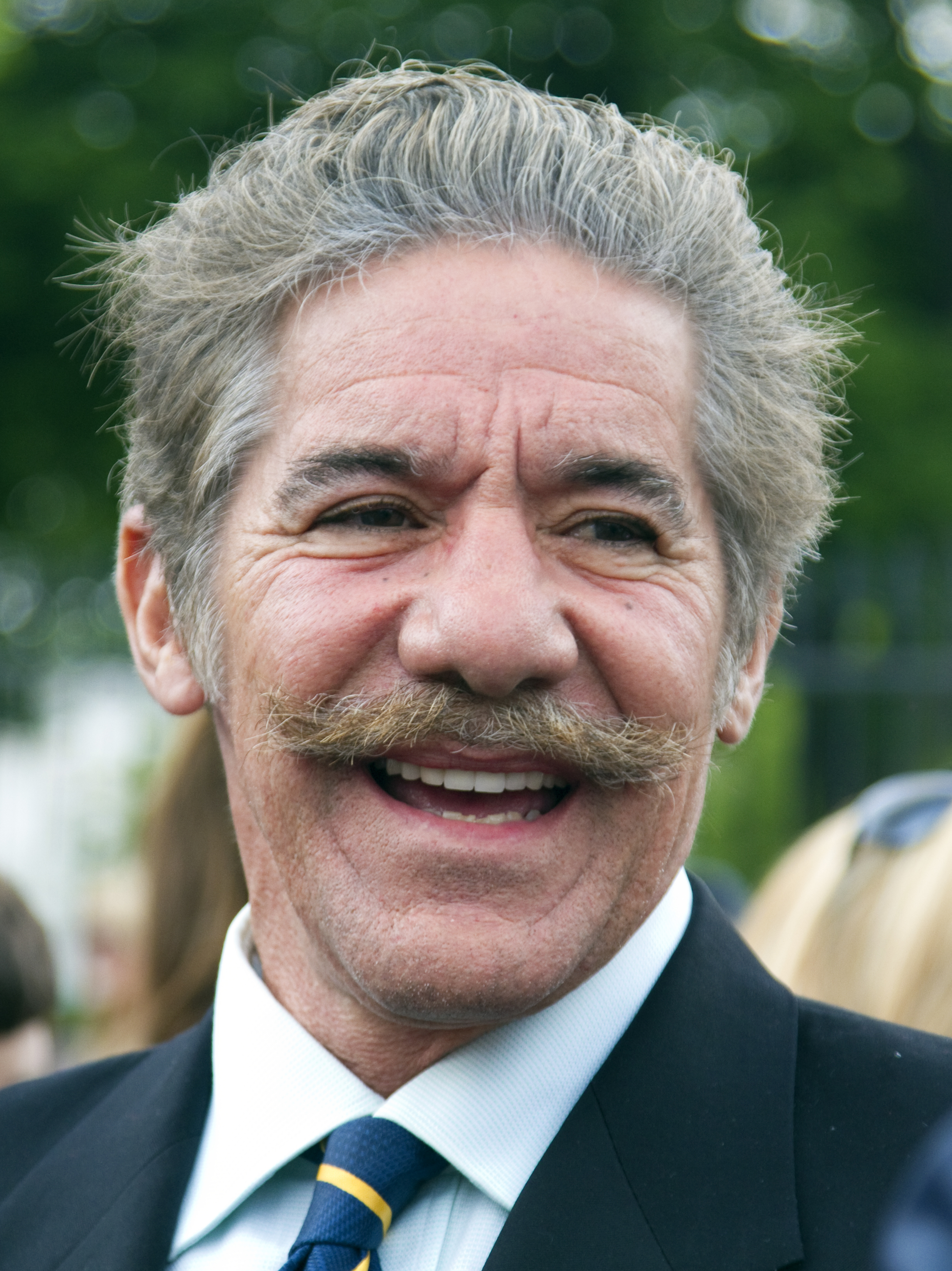
Geraldo Rivera

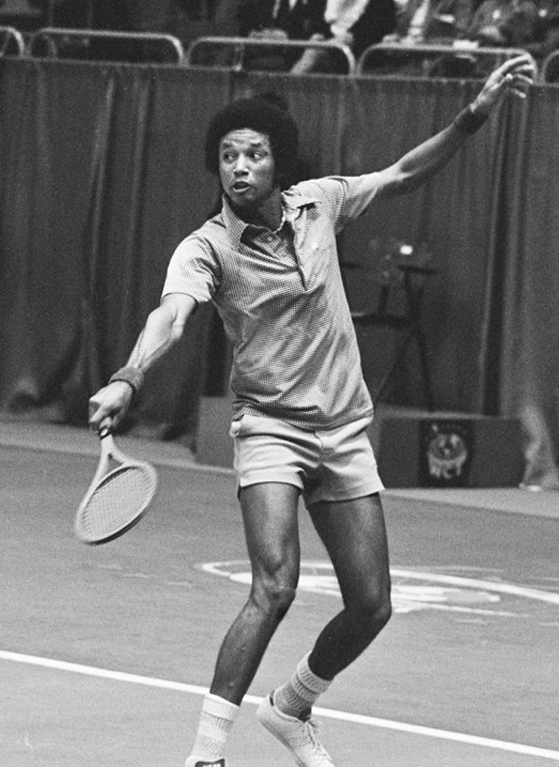
Arthur Ashe

- July 1
  - Freddie Lewis, American basketball player
  - Jeff Wayne, American musician
- July 2 – Lauri Peters, American actress and dancer
- July 3
  - Kurtwood Smith, American actor (That '70s Show)
  - Lally Weymouth, American journalist (d. 2025)
- July 4
  - Geraldo Rivera, American reporter, talk show host
  - Bob Odell, former member of the New Hampshire Senate
- July 5 – Curt Blefary, American baseball player (d. 2001)
- July 7 – Joel Siegel, American film critic (d. 2007)
- July 9 – Suzanne Rogers, American actress
- July 10
  - Arthur Ashe, African-American tennis player (d. 1993)
  - Lynne Ober, former member of the New Hampshire House of Representatives
- July 11 – Tom Holland, American screenwriter, actor, and filmmaker
- July 12
  - Walter Murch, American film editor, sound designer
  - Paul Silas, African-American basketball player and coach (d. 2022)
- July 14
  - George Thomas Coker, United States Navy commander
  - Harold Wheeler, American orchestrator, composer, conductor, arranger, record producer, and music director
- July 16 – Jimmy Johnson, American football coach, television analyst
- July 18 – Jerry Chambers, American basketball player
- July 20 – Christopher Murney, American actor, vocal artist
- July 21
  - Edward Herrmann, American actor (d. 2014)
  - Bob Shrum, American political consultant
- July 22 – Kay Bailey Hutchison, American politician
- July 23
  - Randall Forsberg, American nuclear freeze advocate (d. 2007)
  - Bob Hilton, American game show announcer, host
  - Larry Manetti, American actor
  - Clela Rorex, American county clerk, issued first same-sex marriage license (d. 2022)
  - Tony Joe White, American singer, songwriter and guitarist (d. 2018)
- July 27 – Mary Love, African-American soul, gospel singer (d. 2013)
- July 28
  - Mike Bloomfield, American guitarist and composer (d. 1981)
  - Bill Bradley, American politician

=== August ===
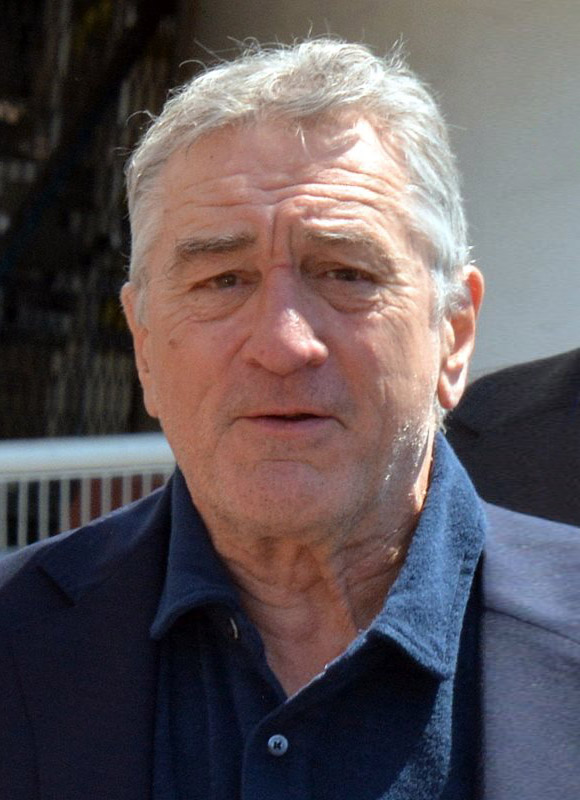
Robert De Niro

- August 2 – Max Wright, American actor (d. 2019)
- August 5 – Nelson Briles, American baseball player (d. 2005)
- August 6 – Jim Hardin, American baseball pitcher (Baltimore Orioles, New York Yankees, Atlanta Braves) (d. 1991)
- August 9 – Ken Norton, African-American boxer, actor (d. 2013)
- August 10
  - Louis E. Brus, American chemist, Nobel Prize laureate (d. 2026)
  - Ronnie Spector, born Veronica Bennett, American pop singer (The Ronettes) (d. 2022)
- August 11 – Abigail Folger, American heiress, murder victim (d. 1969)
- August 14 – Jon McBride, American astronaut (d. 2024)
- August 17 – Robert De Niro, American actor
- August 18 – Martin Mull, American actor and comedian (d. 2024)
- August 19 – Edwin Hawkins, American urban contemporary gospel musician (d. 2018)
- August 21 – Clydie King, American musician (d. 2019)
- August 23
  - Rodney Alcala, American serial killer, kidnapper, and rapist (d. 2021)
  - Bobby Diamond, American actor (d. 2019)
- August 27
  - Bob Kerrey, American politician
  - Tuesday Weld, American actress
- August 28
  - Lou Piniella, American baseball player, manager
  - David Soul, American-born actor and singer (d. 2024)
- August 30
  - Tal Brody, American-born Israeli basketball player
  - Robert Crumb, American artist, illustrator
  - Altovise Davis, American entertainer (d. 2009)

=== September ===
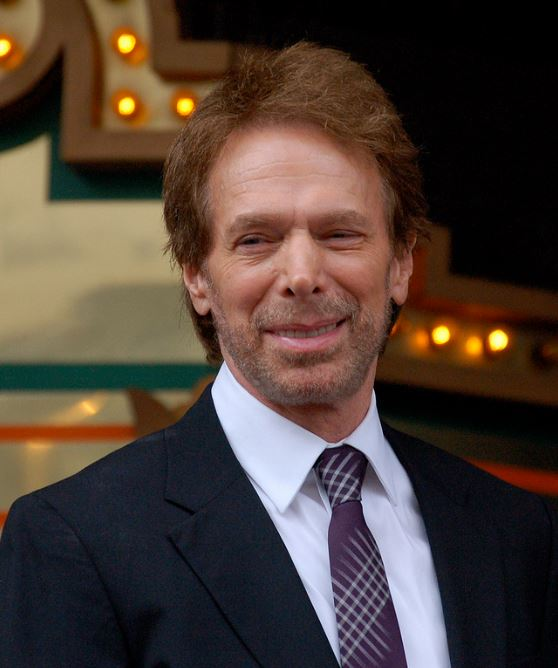
Jerry Bruckheimer

- September 6 – Harris Hines, American judge (d. 2018)
- September 7
  - Gloria Gaynor, American singer
  - Tom Matchick, American baseball player (d. 2022)
- September 8
  - Michael J. Bransfield, American Roman Catholic prelate (d. 2026)
  - Alvy Ray Smith, American computer scientist, co-founded Pixar
- September 9 – Art LaFleur, American actor (d. 2021)
- September 10
  - Daniel Truhitte, American actor
  - Neale Donald Walsch, American author (Conversations with God)
- September 11
  - Jack Ely, singer and guitarist (d. 2015)
  - Mickey Hart, drummer, percussionist, and musicologist
- September 13 – Mildred D. Taylor, American writer
- September 18 – Nina Wayne, American actress
- September 19 – Joe Morgan, American Hall of Fame baseball player (d. 2020)
- September 21 – Jerry Bruckheimer, American film and television producer
- September 22 – Toni Basil, American musician, video artist ("Mickey")
- September 24 – Linda Deutsch, American journalist (d. 2024)
- September 25 – Robert Gates, 22nd United States Secretary of Defense
- September 28 – J. T. Walsh, American actor (d. 1998)

=== October ===
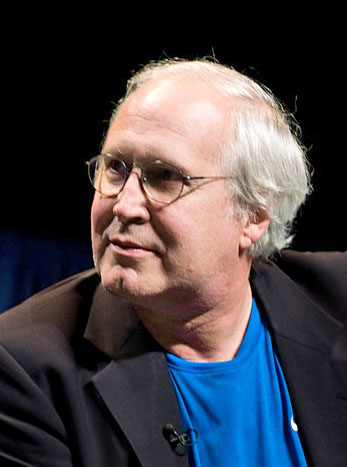
Chevy Chase

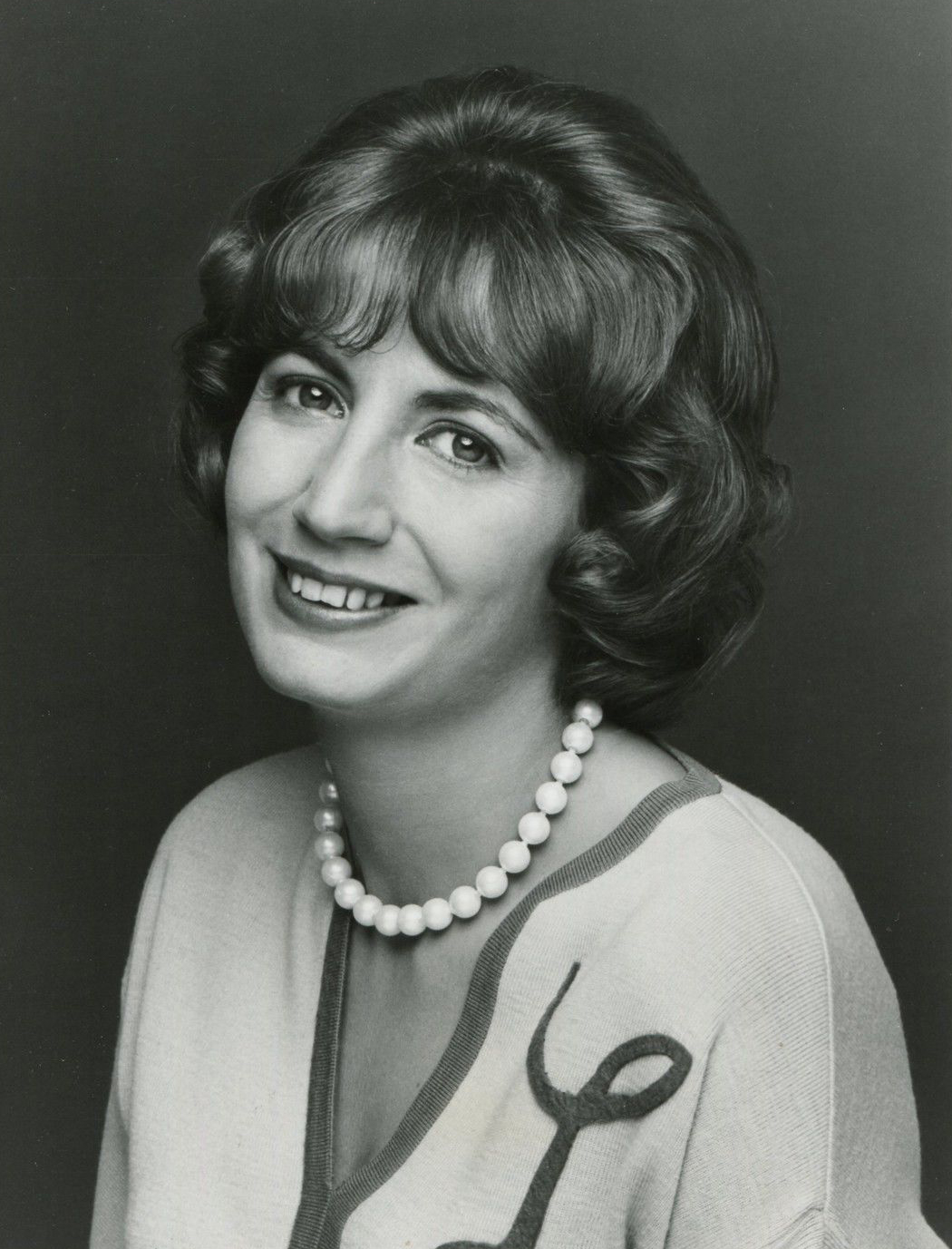
Penny Marshall

- October 2 – Franklin Rosemont, American poet (d. 2009)
- October 3
  - Jeff Bingaman, American politician
  - Bill McGlaughlin, American composer and conductor (d. 2026)
- October 4
  - Buddy Roemer, American politician, investor and banker (d. 2021)
  - Jimy Williams, American baseball player and coach (d. 2024)
- October 5
  - Bonnie Bryant, American golfer
  - Ben Cardin, American politician
- October 7 – Oliver North, American military officer, military historian, political commentator, author and television host
- October 8
  - Chevy Chase, American comedian, actor (Saturday Night Live)
  - R. L. Stine, American novelist (Goosebumps)
- October 11 – Gene Watson, American country singer
- October 12 – Jeffrey R. MacDonald, American physician and United States Army Officer
- October 14
  - Lois Hamilton, American model, actress and artist (d. 1999)
  - Lance Rentzel, American football player (d. 2026)
- October 15 – Penny Marshall, American actress, director and producer (d. 2018)
- October 19
  - John L. Carroll, judge and academic administrator (d. 2023)
  - Rodger Parsons, American voice actor
- October 24
  - José E. Serrano, American politician
  - Susan Shaw, American conservationist (d. 2022)
- October 27
  - Carmen Argenziano, American actor (d. 2019)
  - Bev Scalze, American politician (d. 2021)
- October 29
  - John McCoy, American politician (d. 2023)
  - Don Simpson, American film producer, screenwriter, and actor (d. 1996)

=== November ===
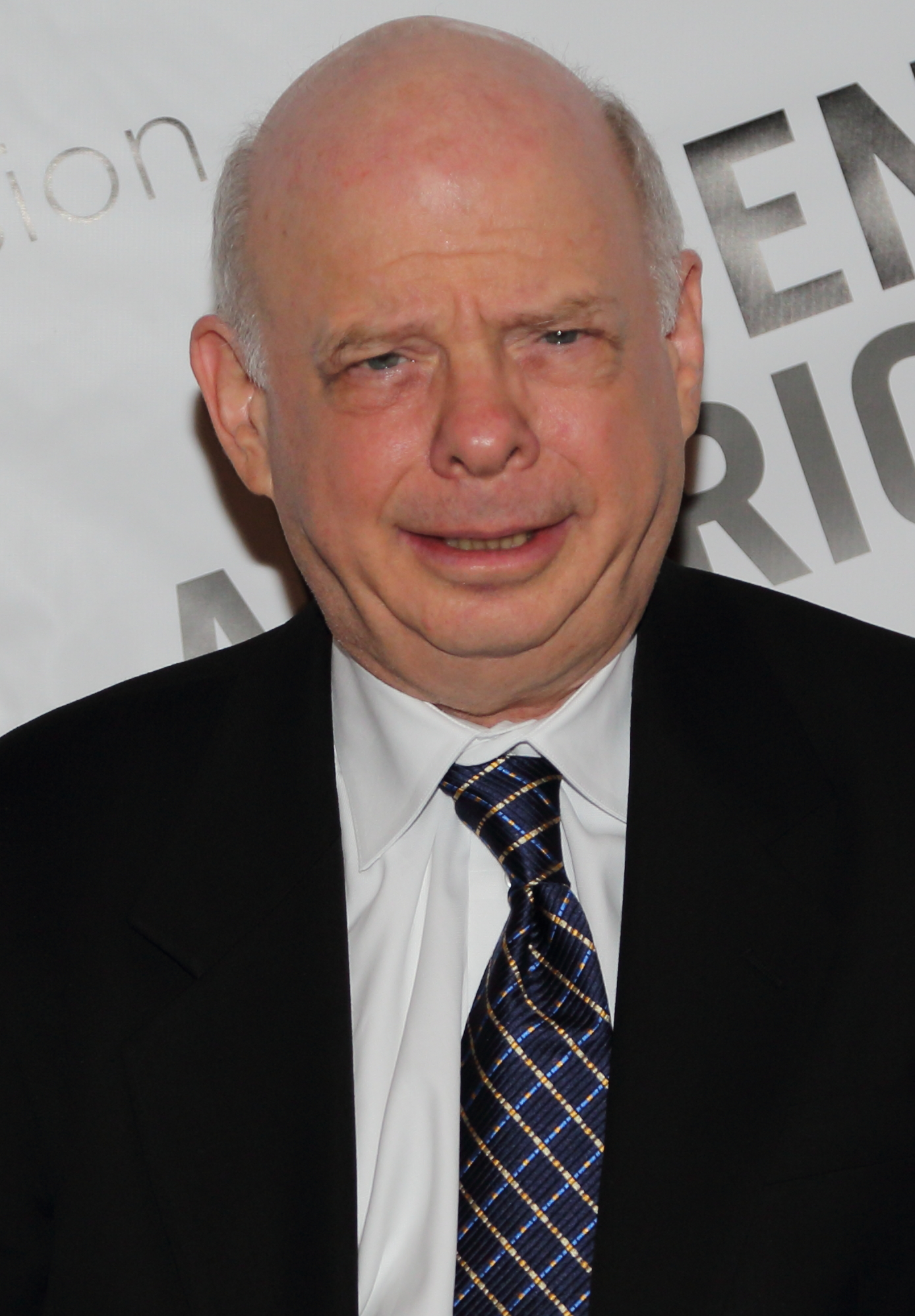
Wallace Shawn

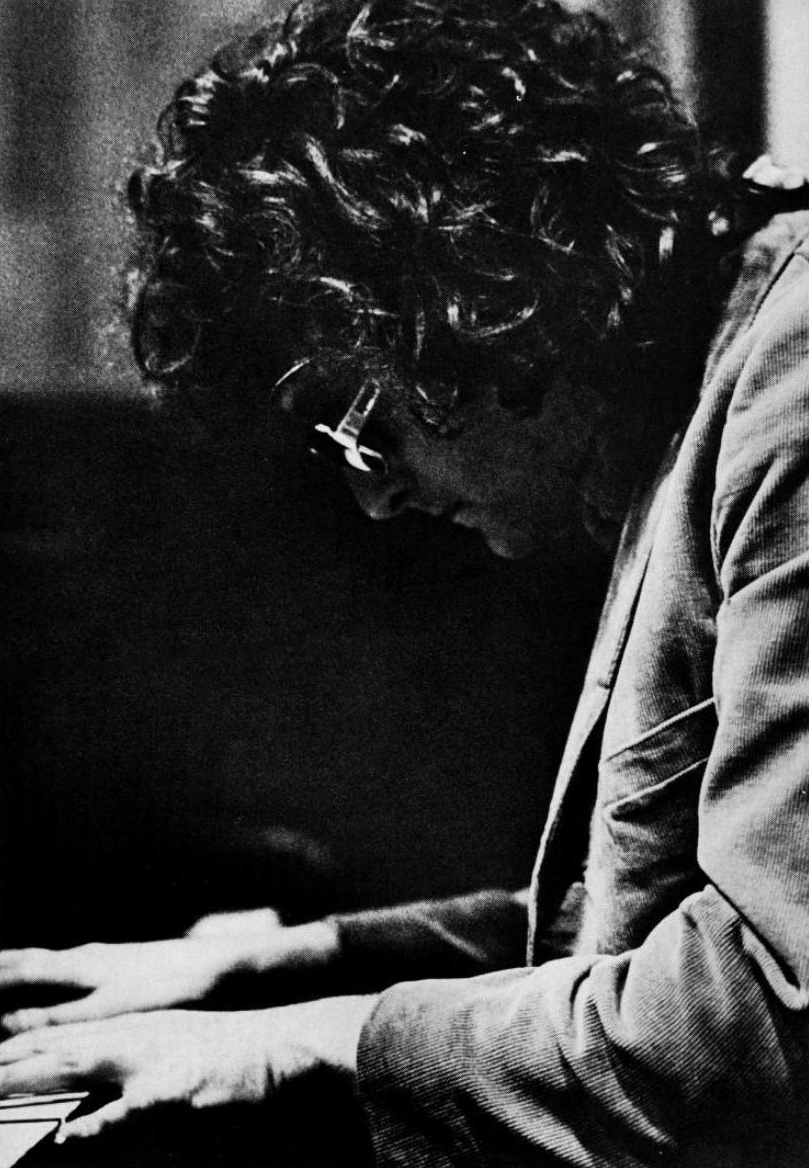
Randy Newman

- November 4 – Chuck Scarborough, American news anchor
- November 5 – Sam Shepard, American playwright, actor (d. 2017)
- November 7
  - Stephen Greenblatt, American literary critic
  - Michael Spence, American economist, Nobel Prize laureate
- November 10 – Saxby Chambliss, American politician
- November 11 – Dave Cockrum, American comic book artist (d. 2006)
- November 12 – Wallace Shawn, American actor
- November 13 – Jay Sigel, American golfer
- November 14 – Peter Norton, American software engineer, businessman
- November 17
  - Lauren Hutton, American actress, model
  - Michael Parks, American reporter (d. 2022)
- November 21 – Larry Mahan, American rodeo cowboy (d. 2023)
- November 22
  - Gary M. Heidnik, American killer, kidnapper, and rapist (d. 1999)
  - Billie Jean King, American tennis player
  - William Kotzwinkle, American novelist, screenwriter
- November 23 – Jeff Jordan, American football player (d. 2022)
- November 24 – Dave Bing, American mayor, longtime NBA player
- November 25 – Peter Adair, American filmmaker (d. 1996)
- November 26 – Marilynne Robinson, American writer
- November 28 – Randy Newman, American musician
- November 30 – Terrence Malick, American film director

=== December ===
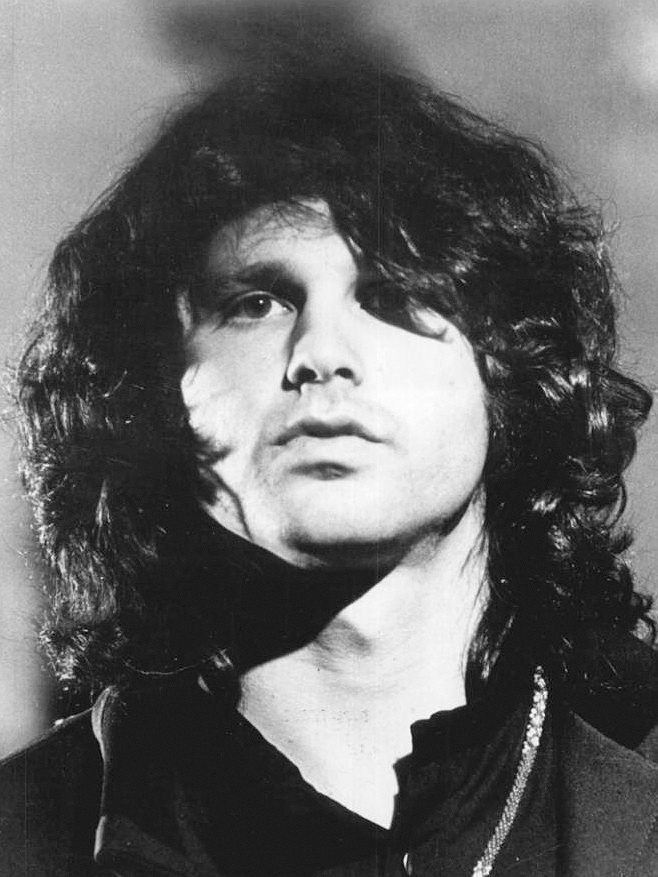
Jim Morrison

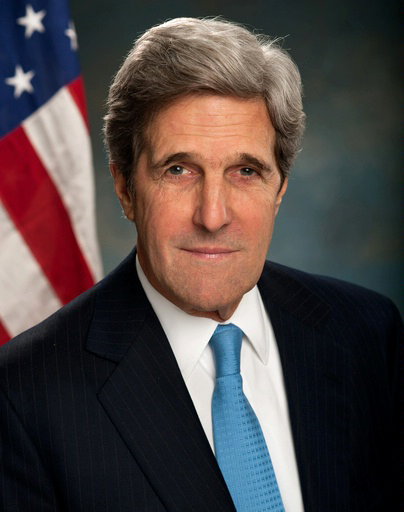
John Kerry

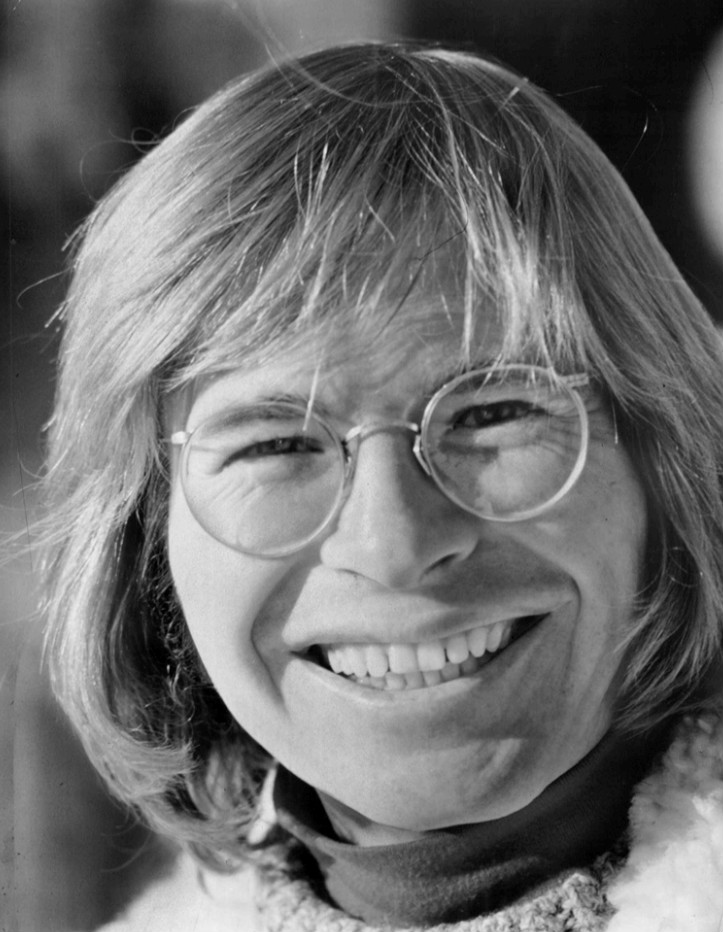
John Denver

- December 1 – Kenny Moore, American athlete and journalist (d. 2022)
- December 2
  - Wayne Allard, American politician
  - William Wegman, American photographer
- December 8
  - Larry Martin, American paleontologist (d. 2013)
  - Jim Morrison, American singer, songwriter and poet (d. 1971 in France)
- December 11 – John Kerry, American politician, 68th U.S. Secretary of State
- December 12
  - Dickey Betts, American guitarist, singer, songwriter, and composer (The Allman Brothers Band) (d. 2024)
  - E. Jean Carroll, American journalist and advice columnist
  - Buster Jones, American actor and television host (d. 2014)
  - Gianni Russo, American actor
  - Phyllis Somerville, American actress (d. 2020)
  - Grover Washington Jr., African-American saxophonist (d. 1999)
- December 13 – Larry R. Hicks, American jurist (d. 2024)
- December 16 – Steven Bochco, American television producer (d. 2018)
- December 17 – Rick Nolan, American politician (d. 2024)
- December 18 – John Thrasher, American politician (d. 2025)
- December 19 – Ross M. Lence, American political scientist (d. 2006)
- December 21 – Jack Nance, American actor (d. 1996)
- December 22 – Paul Wolfowitz, American political scientist
- December 23
  - Elizabeth Hartman, American actress (d. 1987)
  - Harry Shearer, American actor, comedian and screenwriter
- December 24
  - James A. Johnson, American business leader, philanthropist (d. 2020)
  - Thomas G. Plaskett, American business executive (d. 2021)
- December 27
  - Cokie Roberts, American broadcast political journalist (d. 2019)
  - Diana Wall, American environmental scientist (d. 2024)
- December 28
  - Billy Chapin, American child actor (d. 2016)
  - Craig MacIntosh, American illustrator
- December 31 – John Denver, American musician (d. 1997)

== Deaths ==
- January 5 – George Washington Carver, African American botanist (b. c.1864)
- January 6 – Alice May Douglas, author (b. 1865)
- January 7 – Nikola Tesla, electrical engineer (b. 1856 in Serbia)
- January 21 – Robert Henry English, admiral (b. 1888)
- January 23 – Alexander Woollcott, critic (b. 1887)
- January 25 – Mayme Schweble, gold miner and politician (born 1874)
- February 1 – Foy Draper, Olympic track athlete, killed on active service (b. 1911)
- February 3 – Verina Morton Jones, African American physician, suffragist and clubwoman (b. 1865)
- February 11 – Bess Houdini, stage assistant and wife of Harry Houdini (b. 1876)
- February 17 – Armand J. Piron, jazz musician (b. 1888)
- February 22 – Ben Robertson, novelist, journalist, and war correspondent (b. 1903)
- April 3 – Conrad Veidt, actor (b. 1893 in Germany)
- April 4 – David Roitman, cantor (b. 1884 in Russia)
- May 16 – William Andrew Johnson, formerly enslaved by an American president (b. 1858)
- May 20 – Joe Trees, college footballer and oil executive (b. 1870)
- May 22 – Helen Herron Taft, First Lady of the United States (b. 1861)
- May 26 – Edsel Ford, President of the Ford Motor Company (b. 1893)
- June 4 – Kermit Roosevelt, businessman, soldier and explorer, suicide (b. 1889)
- July 16 – Saul Raphael Landau, Polish Jewish lawyer, journalist, publicist and Zionist activist (b. 1870 in Kraków)
- September 12 – David Bacon, actor (b. 1914)
- September 15 – John Flammang Schrank, attempted assassin of Theodore Roosevelt (b. 1876)
- November 22 – Lorenz Hart, lyricist (b. 1895)
- November 24 – Henry M. Mullinnix, admiral (killed in action) (b. 1892)
- December 14
  - John W. Brady, Texas judge and murderer (b. 1869)
  - John Harvey Kellogg, doctor (b. 1852)
- December 15 – Fats Waller, African American jazz pianist (b. 1904)

== See also ==
- List of American films of 1943
- Timeline of United States history (1930–1949)
- Timeline of World War II
