= Manuela Campanelli =

Manuela Campanelli may refer to:

- Manuela Campanelli (science journalist)
- Manuela Campanelli (scientist)
