= CGWA =

CGWA may refer to:

- Center for Gravitational Wave Astronomy at the University of Texas, Brownsville
- Controlled Ground Water Area
