= University of Texas at Brownsville College of Science, Mathematics, and Technology =

The University of Texas at Brownsville College of Science, Mathematics, and Technology
- Dean: Mikhail M. Bouniaev, Ph.D.
- Location: Brownsville, Texas, United States
- Website: Utb.edu/vpaa/csmt

The College of Science, Mathematics, and Technology (abbreviated as CSMT) was the science college of the former (1992-2015) University of Texas at Brownsville. It consisted of six academic departments. The six departments employed diverse faculty members - many of whom are leading experts in the fields - who have received funding from a variety of funding agencies, including the National Science Foundation, the National Institutes of Health, the Department of Education, and the Department of Defense, among others. The average active ongoing external funding is about 25-30 million dollars. In 2002, the Center for Gravitational Wave Astronomy (CGWA) research center was founded to help "develop excellence in research and education in areas related to gravitational wave astronomy."

CSMT had partnership agreements for scientific collaboration and students exchange with universities in Europe, Asia and Australia.As of 2012, the college hosted more than 1,000 students enrolled in twenty-eight undergraduate and seven graduate programs. The programs offer a range of degree plans from certificates and associate degrees up to cooperative Ph.D. degrees with University of Texas at San Antonio. The college hosts annual national/international conferences and workshops in discrete geometry and gravitational waves among others. In 2012, CSMT initiated its own cohort program and student advisory council.

== Departments ==
=== Department of Biological Sciences ===
The Department of Biological Sciences at the University of Texas at Brownsville undertakes teaching, research, and community service. The department offers courses that cover a range of biological topics at both the undergraduate and graduate levels. Current research interests cover a broad range of taxonomic groups (e.g. all things aquatic) to a variety of ecosystems (e.g., coastal marine, subtropical, thorn scrub, and freshwater).

==== Bachelor's Degrees ====
- Biology
- Biology – 8th-12th Grade Teaching

==== Graduate Degrees ====
- Master of Science in Biology
- Master of Science in Interdisciplinary Studies concentration in Biology

=== Department of Chemistry and Environmental Sciences ===
The Department of Chemistry and Environmental Sciences at the University of Texas at Brownsville undertakes teaching and research. Current research projects include wetland restoration at the Bahia Grande Unit of Laguna Atascosa National Wildlife Refuge, artificial reef monitoring in the Gulf of Mexico, and the impacts of the US-Mexico border fence. Students work with organic molecules, assembling them at the thicknesses of a single molecule as well as nanotechnology. The department has also looked into the recent swine flu epidemic, and work on furthered understanding of how indigenous medicinal plants used in the US-Mexico Border region may be used in the treatment of diabetes.

==== Bachelor's Degrees ====
- Chemistry
- Environmental Sciences
- Chemistry – 8th-12th Grade Teaching
- Environmental Sciences – 8th-12th Grade Teaching

=== Department of Computer and Information Sciences ===
The Department of Computer and Information Sciences at the University of Texas at Brownsville undertakes teaching and research. The department offers undergraduate and postgraduate education. In 2010 CS program received ABET accreditation.

==== Certificates ====
- Computer Information Technology
- Computer Web Development

==== Associate Degrees ====
- Computer Information Systems
- Computer Science
- Computer Web Development

==== Bachelor's Degrees ====
- Computer Science
- Computational Science
- Computer Information System Technology
- Computer Information System Technology Teaching

==== Graduate Degrees ====
- Master of Science in Computer Science
- Master of Science in Interdisciplinary Studies concentration in Computer Science

=== Department of Engineering ===
The department began in 1996 as Engineering Technology and became the Engineering Department in 2005. In 2010, the Engineering Physics program was accredited by the Engineering Accreditation Committee (EAC) of ABET. The Engineering Department strives to achieve the highest academic standards in research, teaching and service to the community.

==== Bachelor's Degrees ====
- Engineering Physics - Bioengineering
- Engineering Physics - Computer
- Engineering Physics - Electrical
- Engineering Physics - Mechanical

=== Department of Mathematics ===
The Department of Mathematics offers a Bachelor of Science degree as well as a Master of Science degree in Mathematics. The undergraduate curriculum prepares students for graduate studies, careers in applied mathematics, and teaching careers in mathematics. The graduate program provides students with knowledge in theoretical and applied mathematics as required by various disciplines in science and education.

==== Bachelor's Degrees ====
- Mathematics
- Mathematics – 4th-8th Grade Teaching
- Mathematics – 8th- 12th Grade Teaching

==== Graduate Degree ====
- Master of Science in Mathematics

=== Department of Physics & Astronomy ===
The Department has 17 full-time faculty members actively engaged in research in the areas of Biophysics, Nanotechnology, Experimental Physics, Gravitational Wave Astronomy, Relativistic Astrophysics and Physics Education. The department places special emphasis on the involvement of students, at both the undergraduate and graduate levels, in research.

==== Bachelor's Degrees ====
- Physics
- Physics - Biophysics Specialization
- Physics – 8th-12th Grade Teaching
- Science – 4th-8th Grade Teaching

==== Graduate Degrees ====
- Master of Science in Physics
- Cooperative Ph.D. in Physics with University of Texas at San Antonio

== CSMT Cohort Program ==
Starting in fall 2012, first-time freshman majoring in Chemistry, Biology, Mathematics, or Engineering were eligible to join the CSMT Cohort Program. A cohort is a group of students who follow the same set schedule and progress through an accelerated program together. The program was created in order to create an interactive learning environment, facilitate networking opportunities, strengthen student relationships, and enhance the learning experience.
