= Richard H. Price =

American theoretical physicist (b. 1943)

- Born: March 1, 1943 (age 83); New York City, New York
- Education: Stuyvesant High School, Caltech, Cornell University
- Known for: Price's theorem; black hole perturbation theory
- Awards: Fellow of the American Physical Society; Fellow of the American Association for the Advancement of Science
- Scientific career
- Fields: Physics
- Workplaces: University of Utah, University of Texas at Brownsville, MIT, UMass Dartmouth
- Doctoral advisor: Kip Thorne

Richard H. Price (born March 1, 1943) is an American physicist specializing in general relativity. He is known for Price’s theorem and contributions to black hole perturbation theory.

== Early life and education ==
Price graduated from Stuyvesant High School in 1960, and went on to earn a dual degree in physics and engineering from Cornell University in 1965. He earned his PhD in 1971 from Caltech under the supervision of Kip Thorne.

== Career ==
Price spent his career from 1971 to 2004 at the University of Utah, where he holds the title of emeritus professor. In 2004, he joined the Center for Gravitational Wave Astronomy at the University of Texas at Brownsville. As of 2015, he became senior lecturer in physics at MIT. He is also on the adjunct faculty at the University of Massachusetts Dartmouth.

In 2017, Price became the editor of the American Journal of Physics.

== Research ==
=== Price’s theorem ===
Price is probably best known for a 1972 theorem that is usually informally stated as follows: any inhomogeneities in the spacetime geometry outside a black hole will be radiated away. (Any such inhomogeneities can be quantified as nonzero higher multipole moments.) Price's theorem explains how the no hair theorem is enforced.

=== Numerical relativity ===
Price also made pioneering numerical simulations which established (nonrigorously) a precise scenario for the emission of gravitational radiation during the merger of two compact objects (such as two black holes). Subsequent work has largely confirmed the scenario which was first developed in his work. These simulations have provided a major impetus for the development of gravitational wave detectors such as LIGO. He has also produced relativity visualizations.

== Teaching and honors ==
Price has done much in development of pedagogical techniques in physics at the undergraduate, graduate, and postdoc levels; a significant portion at the University of Utah in Salt Lake City, Utah.

Price is the coauthor of three well known books in general relativity. He is a Fellow of the American Physical Society and the American Association for the Advancement of Science.

== Books ==
- Lightman, Alan P.; Press, William H.; Price, Richard H. & Teukolsky, Saul A. (1975). Problem Book in Relativity and Gravitation. Princeton: Princeton University Press. ISBN 0-691-08162-X.
- Thorne, Kip S.; Price, Richard H. & Macdonald, Douglas A. (1986). Black Holes: the Membrane Paradigm. New Haven: Yale University Press. ISBN 0-300-03770-8.
- Hawking, Stephen W.; Thorne, Kip S.; Novikov, Igor; Ferris, Timothy; Lightman, Alan; Price, Richard H. (2002). The Future of Spacetime. New York, NY: W. W. Norton & Co. ISBN 0-393-02022-3.
