= Manuela Campanelli (scientist) =

Swiss astrophysicist

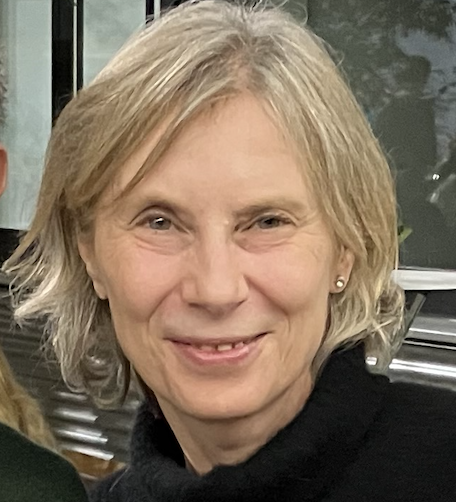
- Born: Switzerland
- Education: University of Perugia; University of Bern
- Occupations: astrophysicist, professor
- Known for: Numerical Relativity: Binary Black Holes and Gravitational Waves. GravitoMagnetohydrodynamics: Black Hole Accretion Compact Binary Mergers and Gravitational Core Collapse

Manuela Campanelli is an American-Italian theoretical astrophysicist and mathematician. She is distinguished professor of Astrophysics and the John Vouros Endowed Professor at the Rochester Institute of Technology.

Her research focuses on numerical relativity, gravitational-wave astrophysics, black-hole mergers, neutron-star mergers, relativistic jets, and multimessenger astrophysics. Her work has contributed to the computational study of compact-object mergers and the interpretation of gravitational-wave signals.

Campanelli is a Fellow of the American Physical Society, elected in 2009, and a Fellow of the International Society on General Relativity and Gravitation, elected in 2019. In 2024 she received the Richard A. Isaacson Award in Gravitational-Wave Science from the American Physical Society for contributions to numerical relativity and gravitational-wave astrophysics.

== Early life and education ==
Campanelli was born in Switzerland and moved to Italy with her family at the age of fourteen. She studied applied mathematics at the University of Perugia, graduating in 1991. She subsequently pursued doctoral studies in theoretical physics at the University of Bern, earning her doctorate in 1996. Her doctoral work focused on theoretical physics and quantum field theory aspects of black holes.

Following completion of her doctorate, she held research appointments at the University of Utah and the University of Tübingen before joining the Max Planck Institute for Gravitational Physics, where she began extensive work in high-performance computational simulations of black-hole systems.

== Career ==
From 1998 to 2002, Campanelli served as a Marie Curie Postdoctoral Research Fellow at the Albert Einstein Institute, where she applied large-scale computational methods to problems in general relativity and black-hole dynamics.

In 2002 she joined the University of Texas at Brownsville as Assistant Professor of Physics and later Associate Professor. Between 2003 and 2006 she served as Associate Director of the Center for Gravitational Wave Astronomy, contributing to interdisciplinary work connecting astrophysics, numerical relativity, and gravitational-wave detection.

Campanelli joined Rochester Institute of Technology in 2007 as Associate Professor. She was promoted to Full Professor in 2011 and to Distinguished Professor in 2020. In 2025 she was appointed Distinguished Professor of Astrophysics and John Vouros Endowed Professor.

At RIT she has held multiple leadership positions, including Director of the Center for Computational Relativity and Gravitation, Co-Director of the Frontiers in Gravitational Wave Astronomy initiative, and Co-Director of the Astrophysics and Space Physics Institute for Research Excellence.

In 2013, she served as Chair of the American Physical Society Topical Group in Gravitation. She has also participated in a number of related professional initiatives and has served on the board of Physical Review D, among other editorial and organizational roles.

== Research and scholarly work ==
Campanelli’s research centers on numerical relativity and computational astrophysics, particularly simulations of merging compact objects such as binary black holes and neutron stars. Her work combines Einstein’s field equations with high-performance supercomputing to model gravitational-wave generation, relativistic matter dynamics, and electromagnetic counterparts to compact-object mergers.

She was lead author of the 2005 paper Accurate Evolutions of Orbiting Black-Hole Binaries without Excision, which introduced a breakthrough computational method for stable long-term simulations of binary black-hole systems. This result resolved a longstanding numerical problem in relativity and enabled realistic waveform predictions later used in gravitational-wave astronomy. The paper was later recognized by the American Physical Society as one of the landmark papers of the century in gravitational physics.

Her subsequent work demonstrated that merged supermassive black holes can experience gravitational recoil velocities exceeding 4,000 km/s, sufficient to eject black holes from their host galaxies. This finding had significant implications for models of galactic evolution and black-hole demographics.

Campanelli later expanded her research to include relativistic magnetohydrodynamics simulations of accretion disks around inspiraling binaries, mini-disk behavior near merger, relativistic jet formation, electromagnetic signatures of supermassive binary black holes, and multimessenger astrophysical signals associated with compact-object mergers.

Her research has also addressed waveform modeling for gravitational-wave detection and three-body black-hole interactions.

Campanelli’s work was cited by Kip Thorne in his 2017 Nobel Prize lecture recognizing the detection of gravitational waves.

=== Scientific impact ===
Campanelli’s work has contributed to the development of numerical tools used in gravitational-wave astronomy and theoretical models describing black-hole merger dynamics.

Her simulations played a role in the theoretical groundwork supporting observational interpretation by gravitational-wave observatories such as LIGO Scientific Collaboration and related international detector collaborations.

Her contributions have shaped theoretical understanding of gravitational recoil, binary merger dynamics, multimessenger signatures, and computational approaches to relativistic astrophysics.

== Awards and honors ==
Campanelli was elected Fellow of the American Physical Society in 2009 for contributions to numerical relativity and black-hole simulations. In 2019 she was elected Fellow of the International Society on General Relativity and Gravitation.

In 2024 she received the Richard A. Isaacson Award in Gravitational-Wave Science, one of the field’s major recognitions for contributions to gravitational-wave theory and computation.

Her 2005 numerical-relativity breakthrough paper was recognized by the American Physical Society as one of the landmark papers of the century in gravitational physics.

She has also received institutional research distinction awards from Rochester Institute of Technology for contributions to computational astrophysics and interdisciplinary gravitational-wave science.

== Publications ==
=== Books ===
- Campanelli, Manuela (1996). Solutions to the semiclassical theory of gravity. Verlag nicht ermittelbar. OCLC 81106174.
- Campanelli, Manuela (2015). Revealing the Hidden Universe with Supercomputer Simulations of Black Hole Mergers. New York: ACM. ISBN 978-1-4503-3723-6. OCLC 6020229499.

=== Journal articles ===
- Baker, J.; Bruegmann, B.; Campanelli, M.; Lousto, C. O.; Takahashi, R. (31 August 2001). "Plunge waveforms from inspiralling binary black holes". Physical Review Letters. 87 (12) 121103. arXiv:gr-qc/0102037. Bibcode:2001PhRvL..87l1103B. doi:10.1103/PhysRevLett.87.121103. ISSN 0031-9007. PMID 11580497. S2CID 39434471.
- Baker, J.; Campanelli, M.; Lousto, C. (7 January 2002). "The Lazarus project: A pragmatic approach to binary black hole evolutions". Physical Review D. 65 (4) 044001. arXiv:gr-qc/0104063. Bibcode:2002PhRvD..65d4001B. doi:10.1103/PhysRevD.65.044001. ISSN 0556-2821. S2CID 11080736.
- Baker, J.; Bruegmann, B.; Campanelli, M.; Lousto, C. O. (21 October 2000). "Gravitational waves from black hole collisions via an eclectic approach". Classical and Quantum Gravity. 17 (20): L149–L156. arXiv:gr-qc/0003027. doi:10.1088/0264-9381/17/20/102. ISSN 0264-9381. S2CID 32012276.
- Bowen, Dennis B.; Mewes, Vassilios; Campanelli, Manuela; Noble, Scott C.; Krolik, Julian H.; Zilhao, Miguel (24 January 2018). "Quasi-Periodic Behavior of Mini-Disks in Binary Black Holes Approaching Merger". The Astrophysical Journal. 853 (1): L17. arXiv:1712.05451. Bibcode:2018ApJ...853L..17B. doi:10.3847/2041-8213/aaa756. ISSN 2041-8213. S2CID 118926956.
- Campanelli, M.; Lousto, C. O.; Marronetti, P.; Zlochower, Y. (22 March 2006). "Accurate Evolutions of Orbiting Black-Hole Binaries Without Excision". Physical Review Letters. 96 (11) 111101. arXiv:gr-qc/0511048. Bibcode:2006PhRvL..96k1101C. doi:10.1103/PhysRevLett.96.111101. ISSN 0031-9007. PMID 16605808. S2CID 5954627.
- Campanelli, M.; Lousto, C. O.; Zlochower, Y. (16 August 2006). "Spinning-black-hole binaries: The orbital hang up". Physical Review D. 74 (4) 041501. arXiv:gr-qc/0604012. Bibcode:2006PhRvD..74d1501C. doi:10.1103/PhysRevD.74.041501. ISSN 1550-7998. S2CID 119376905.
- d'Ascoli, Stéphane; Noble, Scott C.; Bowen, Dennis B.; Campanelli, Manuela; Krolik, Julian H.; Mewes, Vassilios (2 October 2018). "Electromagnetic Emission from Supermassive Binary Black Holes Approaching Merger". The Astrophysical Journal. 865 (2): 140. arXiv:1806.05697. Bibcode:2018ApJ...865..140D. doi:10.3847/1538-4357/aad8b4. ISSN 1538-4357. S2CID 119243049.
- Merritt, David; Zlochower, Yosef; Lousto, Carlos O.; Campanelli, Manuela (25 February 2007). "Maximum gravitational recoil". Physical Review Letters. 98 (23) 231102. arXiv:gr-qc/0702133. Bibcode:2007PhRvL..98w1102C. doi:10.1103/PhysRevLett.98.231102. PMID 17677894. S2CID 29246347.
- Noble, Scott C.; Mundim, Bruno C.; Nakano, Hiroyuki; Krolik, Julian H.; Campanelli, Manuela; Zlochower, Yosef; Yunes, Nicolás (10 August 2012). "Circumbinary MHD Accretion into Inspiraling Binary Black Holes". The Astrophysical Journal. 755 (1): 51. arXiv:1204.1073. Bibcode:2012ApJ...755...51N. doi:10.1088/0004-637X/755/1/51. ISSN 0004-637X. S2CID 17805470.
