= Manuela Campanelli (science journalist) =

Italian journalist

Manuela Maria Campanelli (born 1962 in Milan) is an Italian science journalist. She has written articles for SuperQuark News, Focus, Oggi, OK Salute, Corriere della Sera, Donna & Mamma, and Corriere Medico e Doctor.

She is a graduate of the University of Milan (Biological Sciences) and earned a master's degree in Scientific Journalism from SISSA (Scuola Internazionale Superiore di Studi Avanzati) in Trieste, Italy.

Manuela Campanelli has won numerous prizes and awards, including the Voltolino Prize for Dissemination of Science in 1999, and the Novo Nordisk Media Prize for her article "Living Well with Diabetes” in 2007.

With Luigi Ferini-Strambi (Fondazione San Raffaele del Monte Tabor) she wrote the book Un Sonno Perfetto (A Perfect Sleep), which discusses the causes and treatments of sleep disorders. With Arianna Banderali she wrote the book Ricette low cost: Mangiare bene e sano spendendo poco (Low-cost recipes: eating well and healthily while spending little).

== Books by Manuela Campanelli ==
- Ferini-Strambi, Luigi and Campanelli, Manuela M. (2008). Un sonno perfetto. I segreti per riposare, dormire, vivere meglio (A Perfect Sleep). 256 pages. (Sperling and Kupfer, ISBN 978-88-200-4478-7)
- Banderali, Arianna and Campanelli, M. (2010). Ricette low cost: Mangiare bene e sano spendendo poco (Low-cost recipes). 128 pages. (Edizioni red, ISBN 978-88-573-0169-3)
