= Controlled Ground Water Area =

A controlled ground water area (CGWA) is a category defined by the Department of Natural Resources and Conservation (DNRC) of the state of Montana. A CGWA must satisfy a set of criteria, including ground water withdrawals in excess of recharge; excessive declines in ground water levels or pressures; possibility of contaminant migration; or the existence of significant disputes within the area concerning priority of rights, amounts of water being used, or priority of type of use.

Once a CGWA is established, anyone wishing to drill a well must first apply for and receive a Permit for Beneficial Water Use from the DNRC. Some CGWAs have additional restrictions.
