= Gulf Hotel fire =

1943 hotel fire in downtown Houston, Texas, United States

- Date: September 7, 1943
- Location: Downtown Houston, Texas, United States; 29.763°N 95.364°W
- Type: Fire
- Deaths: 55

The Gulf Hotel fire claimed 55 lives in the early-morning hours of September 7, 1943 in Downtown Houston, Texas, United States. The fire remains the worst loss of life in a fire in the city's history.

== Hotel ==
The hotel was located on the northwest corner of Louisiana and Preston Streets and occupied the upper two floors of a three-story brick building, with a variety of businesses occupying the first floor. It was an inexpensive hotel near the city's bus depot, and reportedly had 87 beds, most divided from one another by thin wooden partitions, and 50 cots available for half the price of a bed. Second floor rooms could be rented $0.40 USD a night and cots in a communal space on the third floor could be rented for $0.20 USD a night. That night the guest log showed 133 names registered. It was later reported that most of the registered guests were either old, crippled, or drunk.

== Fire ==
Shortly after midnight, the desk clerk was alerted to a smoldering mattress and bed sheet in a room on the second floor, that was thought to have started due to careless smoking. The clerk and a few guests thought they had extinguished the burning mattress and moved it to a closet in the second floor hall. Moments later, the mattress erupted in flames. The fire spread quickly through the second floor and headed toward the third. There were two exits from the hotel, both on the Preston side, one an interior staircase, the other an exterior fire escape. Witnesses described the confusion they experienced during the fire, with one stating, "I'm looking for my friends. I called to them in the room next to mine when I woke up, but the smoke was choking me and I couldn't see."

The fire department's central station was located only a few blocks away at Preston and Caroline Streets. The alarm was received at 12:50 a.m. Deputy Chief Grover Cleveland Adams was the first to arrive at the burning hotel where he summoned a general alarm as he witnessed flames shooting from windows and the roof. It took two hours for firefighters to get the fire under control.

=== Evacuation and victims ===
Ted Felds of Harris County's Emergency Corps arrived at about the same time and noticed many men on the fire escape, including a few on crutches, who were slowing the progress of others behind them still trying to escape. The evacuation on fire escapes soon became disorganized as one had soon become blocked by the fire, causing many to panic and use any means possible to reach the street. Police Homicide Captain C.A. Martindale responded to the scene and later told reporters that he saw a man running down the fire escape with his clothing fully engulfed in flames before he jumped off the fire escape and kept running.

A city detective. H.P. Blanchard, reportedly watched a naked man leap from the third floor of the hotel and then hit an awning before landing on the street. Two men died at the scene after jumping from the hotel's windows. There were 15 other fatalities in area hospitals. Firefighters recovered 38 bodies from the burned out building. In all, 55 people died in the fire and more than 30 were injured.

== Aftermath ==
Donations through the Red Cross helped make sure that the deceased victims were given proper burials. A mass funeral was held for 23 victims of the fire who were never identified and they were buried at the South Park Cemetery in Houston.
