= Mary Love =

American gospel singer

Background information
- Also known as: Mary Love Comer
- Born: Mary Ann Varney; July 27, 1943; Sacramento, California, U.S.
- Died: June 21, 2013 (aged 69)
- Genres: Soul, gospel
- Occupation: Singer

Mary Love (born Mary Ann Varney; July 27, 1943 – June 21, 2013) was an American soul and gospel singer, and Christian evangelist. After the 1980s she was known as Mary Love Comer.

== Life ==
Love was born as Mary Ann Varney (or Mary Ann Allen, according to some sources), in Sacramento, California. After being discovered by Sam Cooke's manager, J. W. Alexander, she began singing on sessions in Los Angeles before recording "You Turned My Bitter into Sweet" for the Modern record label in 1965. Later records for the label met with little success until the single "Move a Little Closer" made No. 48 on the R&B chart in 1966. Her recordings for Modern, some of which were issued in the UK, became popular on the English Northern soul scene. She revisited the lower reaches of the R&B chart with "The Hurt Is Just Beginning" which reached No. 46 for Josie in 1968, but thereafter she made few recordings for some years.

Love married preacher Brad Comer. In the early 1980s, she re-emerged as Mary Love Comer, singing gospel-flavored soul with a Christian message. In 1987, along with her husband, she released the single "Come Out of the Sandbox". The couple also ran their own church in Moreno Valley, California. An album of her material, Now and Then, including some old unreleased recordings, was issued in the UK. She made special appearances onstage at the Jazz Café in 2000, and at a Kent Records anniversary show in 2007, both in London.

Mary Love died on June 21, 2013, at the age of 69.
