= Center for Gravitational Wave Astronomy =

US research center

The Center for Gravitational Wave Astronomy (CGWA) is a research center at the University of Texas Rio Grande Valley (UTRGV). Its core mission is "to further scientific research and education in gravitational wave astronomy". It was founded in 2003 at the UTRGV's predecessor institution UT Brownsville, through a grant from NASA's University Research Centers program.

Research at the CGWA includes the study of gravitational waves and the astrophysics of gravitational wave sources. The center has hosted several international conferences.

Computing facilities at the CGWA include a 41-node cluster "Funes" which was installed at the beginning of 2004, and an older cluster, "Lobizon", with 96 nodes. These computers are used mainly for source modeling and for numerical relativity simulations.
