= 48th United States Congress =

1883-1885 U.S. Congress

←	47th	49th	→
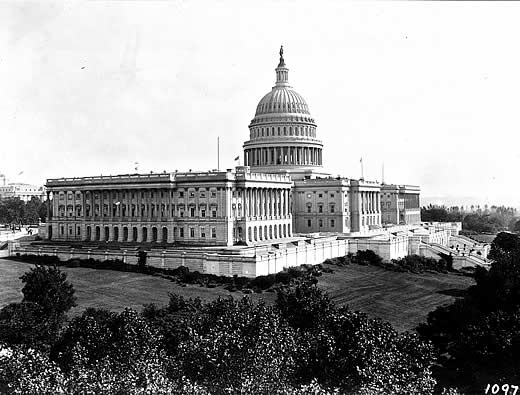
- United States Capitol (1906)

Overview
- Legislative body: United States Congress
- Jurisdiction: United States
- Term: March 4, 1883 – March 4, 1885

Senate
- Members: 76
- President: Vacant
- President pro tempore: George F. Edmunds (R)
- Party control: Republican (through caucus)

House of Representatives
- Members: 325 representatives 8 non-voting delegates
- Speaker: John G. Carlisle (D)
- Party control: Democratic

Sessions
- 1st: December 3, 1883 – July 7, 1884
- 2nd: December 1, 1884 – March 3, 1885

The 48th United States Congress was a meeting of the legislative branch of the United States federal government, consisting of the United States Senate and the United States House of Representatives. It met in Washington, D.C., from March 4, 1883, to March 4, 1885, during the last two years of Chester A. Arthur's presidency. The apportionment of seats in the House of Representatives was based on the 1880 United States census. The Senate had a Republican majority, and the House had a Democratic majority.

== Major events ==
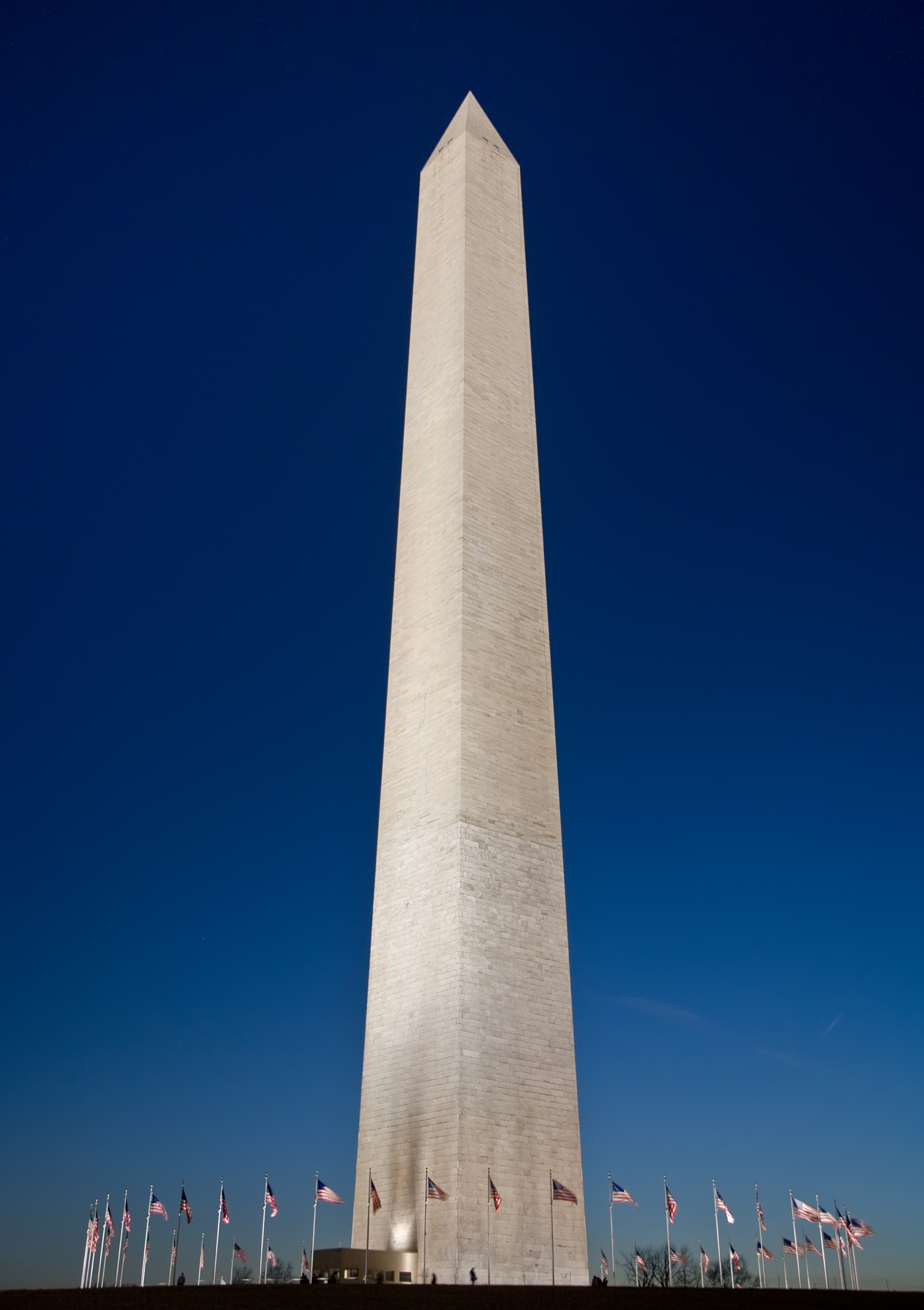
Washington Monument (seen here in 2006) was completed December 6, 1884.

- September 5, 1883: Mary F. Hoyt became the first woman appointed to the U.S. federal civil service (and the second person appointed by examination (in which she came top) instituted under the Pendleton Civil Service Reform Act) when she became a clerk in the Bank Redemption Agency of the Department of the Treasury.
- October 15, 1883: The Supreme Court of the United States declared part of the Civil Rights Act of 1875 unconstitutional, as the Court allowed private individuals and corporations to discriminate based on race.
- November 18, 1883: U.S. and Canadian railroads instituted 5 standard continental time zones, ending the confusion of thousands of local times.
- August 10, 1884: An earthquake measuring 5.5 M_{fa} (based on the felt area) affected a very large portion of the eastern United States. The shock had a maximum Mercalli intensity of VII (Very strong). Chimneys were toppled in New York, New Jersey, Connecticut, and Pennsylvania. Property damage was severe in Jamaica and Amityville in New York.
- October 6, 1884: The United States Naval War College was established in Newport, Rhode Island.
- October 22, 1884: International Meridian Conference in Washington, D.C., fixed the Greenwich meridian as the world's prime meridian.
- November 4, 1884: 1884 United States presidential election: Democratic governor of New York Grover Cleveland defeated Republican James G. Blaine in a very close contest to win the first of his non-consecutive terms.
- December 6: 1884: The Washington Monument was completed.

== Major legislation ==
- The Organic Act of 1884
- The Second Chinese Exclusion Act
- Bureau of Labor Act (1884)

== Territories organized ==
- May 17, 1884: District of Alaska was organized.

== Party summary ==
The count below identifies party affiliations at the beginning of the first session of this Congress, and includes members from vacancies and newly admitted states, when they were first seated. Changes resulting from subsequent replacements are shown below in the "Changes in membership" section.

=== Senate ===
	Party (shading shows control)				Total	Vacant
	Democratic (D)	Readjuster (RA)	Republican (R)	Other	Total	Vacant
End of previous congress	37	1	37	1 (Note: Independent)	76	0
Begin	36	2	37	0	75	1
End	36	2	38	0	76	0
Final voting share	47.4%	2.6%	50.0%	0.0%		
Beginning of next congress	34	2	37	0	73	3

=== House of Representatives ===
	Party (shading shows control)								Total	Vacant
	Democratic (D)	Independent Democratic (ID)	Readjuster (RA)	Independent (I)	Greenback (GB)	Independent Republican (IR)	Republican (R)	Anti- Monopoly (AM)	Total	Vacant
End of previous congress	130	1	0	1	9	1	150	0	292	1
Begin	192	3	5	1	2	1	120	0	324	1
End	197	3	4	2	2	1	113	1	323	2
Final voting share	61.0%	0.9%	1.2%	0.6%	0.6%	0.3%	35.0%	0.3%		
Non-voting members	5	0	0	0	0	0	3	0	8	0
Beginning of next congress	128	1	0	0	10	1	151	128	419	0

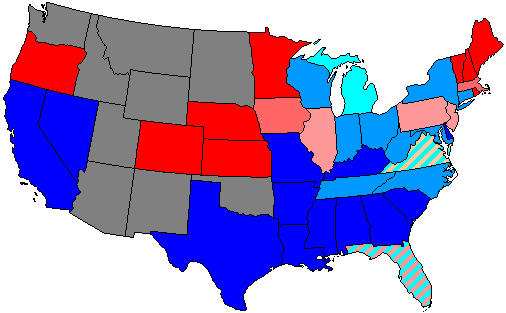
House seats by party holding plurality in state: 80+% to 100% Democratic / 80+% to 100% Republican; 60+% to 80% Democratic / 60+% to 80% Republican; Up to 60% Democratic / Up to 60% Republican

== Leadership ==
=== Senate ===
- President: Vacant. Chester Arthur (R), the most recent Senate president, had become U.S. president on the death of his predecessor September 19, 1881, leaving the office vacant through the end of this Congress.
- President pro tempore: George F. Edmunds (R)
- Republican Conference Chairman: John Sherman
- Democratic Caucus Chairman: George H. Pendleton

=== House of Representatives ===
- Speaker: John G. Carlisle (D)
- Democratic Caucus Chairman: George W. Geddes
- Republican Conference Chairman: Joseph Gurney Cannon
- Democratic Campaign Committee Chairman: William Rosecrans

== Members ==
This list is arranged by chamber, then by state.

Skip to House of Representatives, below

=== Senate ===
Senators are listed by their states and Senate class numbers, which indicate the cycle of their election.

==== Alabama ====
▌2. John T. Morgan (D)
▌3. James L. Pugh (D)

==== Arkansas ====
▌2. Augustus H. Garland (D)
▌3. James D. Walker (D)

==== California ====
▌1. John F. Miller (R)
▌3. James T. Farley (D)

==== Colorado ====
▌2. Thomas M. Bowen (R)
▌3. Nathaniel P. Hill (R)

==== Connecticut ====
▌1. Joseph R. Hawley (R)
▌3. Orville H. Platt (R)

==== Delaware ====
▌1. Thomas F. Bayard Sr. (D)
▌2. Eli Saulsbury (D)

==== Florida ====
▌1. Charles W. Jones (D)
▌3. Wilkinson Call (D)

==== Georgia ====
▌2. Alfred H. Colquitt (D)
▌3. Joseph E. Brown (D)

==== Illinois ====
▌2. Shelby M. Cullom (R)
▌3. John A. Logan (R)

==== Indiana ====
▌1. Benjamin Harrison (R)
▌3. Daniel W. Voorhees (D)

==== Iowa ====
▌2. James F. Wilson (R)
▌3. William B. Allison (R)

==== Kansas ====
▌2. Preston B. Plumb (R)
▌3. John J. Ingalls (R)

==== Kentucky ====
▌2. James B. Beck (D)
▌3. John S. Williams (D)

==== Louisiana ====
▌2. Randall L. Gibson (D)
▌3. Benjamin F. Jonas (D)

==== Maine ====
▌1. Eugene Hale (R)
▌2. William P. Frye (R)

==== Maryland ====
▌1. Arthur Pue Gorman (D)
▌3. James B. Groome (D)

==== Massachusetts ====
▌1. Henry L. Dawes (R)
▌2. George F. Hoar (R)

==== Michigan ====
▌1. Omar D. Conger (R)
▌2. Thomas W. Palmer (R)

==== Minnesota ====
▌1. Samuel J. R. McMillan (R)
▌2. Dwight M. Sabin (R)

==== Mississippi ====
▌1. James Z. George (D)
▌2. Lucius Q. C. Lamar (D)

==== Missouri ====
▌1. Francis Cockrell (D)
▌3. George G. Vest (D)

==== Nebraska ====
▌1. Charles H. Van Wyck (R)
▌2. Charles F. Manderson (R)

==== Nevada ====
▌1. James G. Fair (D)
▌3. John P. Jones (R)

==== New Hampshire ====
▌2. Austin F. Pike (R), from August 2, 1883
▌3. Henry W. Blair (R)

==== New Jersey ====
▌1. William J. Sewell (R)
▌2. John R. McPherson (D)

==== New York ====
▌1. Warner Miller (R)
▌3. Elbridge G. Lapham (R)

==== North Carolina ====
▌2. Matt W. Ransom (D)
▌3. Zebulon B. Vance (D)

==== Ohio ====
▌1. John Sherman (R)
▌3. George H. Pendleton (D)

==== Oregon ====
▌2. Joseph N. Dolph (R)
▌3. James H. Slater (D)

==== Pennsylvania ====
▌1. John I. Mitchell (R)
▌3. J. Donald Cameron (R)

==== Rhode Island ====
▌1. Nelson W. Aldrich (R)
▌2. Henry B. Anthony (R), until September 2, 1884

▌William P. Sheffield (R), November 19, 1884 – January 20, 1885
▌Jonathan Chace (R), from January 20, 1885

==== South Carolina ====
▌2. Matthew C. Butler (D)
▌3. Wade Hampton III (D)

==== Tennessee ====
▌1. Howell E. Jackson (D)
▌2. Isham G. Harris (D)

==== Texas ====
▌1. Samuel B. Maxey (D)
▌2. Richard Coke (D)

==== Vermont ====
▌1. George F. Edmunds (R)
▌3. Justin S. Morrill (R)

==== Virginia ====
▌1. William Mahone (RA)
▌2. Harrison H. Riddleberger (RA)

==== West Virginia ====
▌1. Johnson N. Camden (D)
▌2. John E. Kenna (D)

==== Wisconsin ====
▌1. Philetus Sawyer (R)
▌3. Angus Cameron (R)

Senators' party membership by state at the opening of the 48th Congress in March 1883. 2 Democrats 1 Democrat and 1 Republican 2 Republicans 2 Readjusters Territories

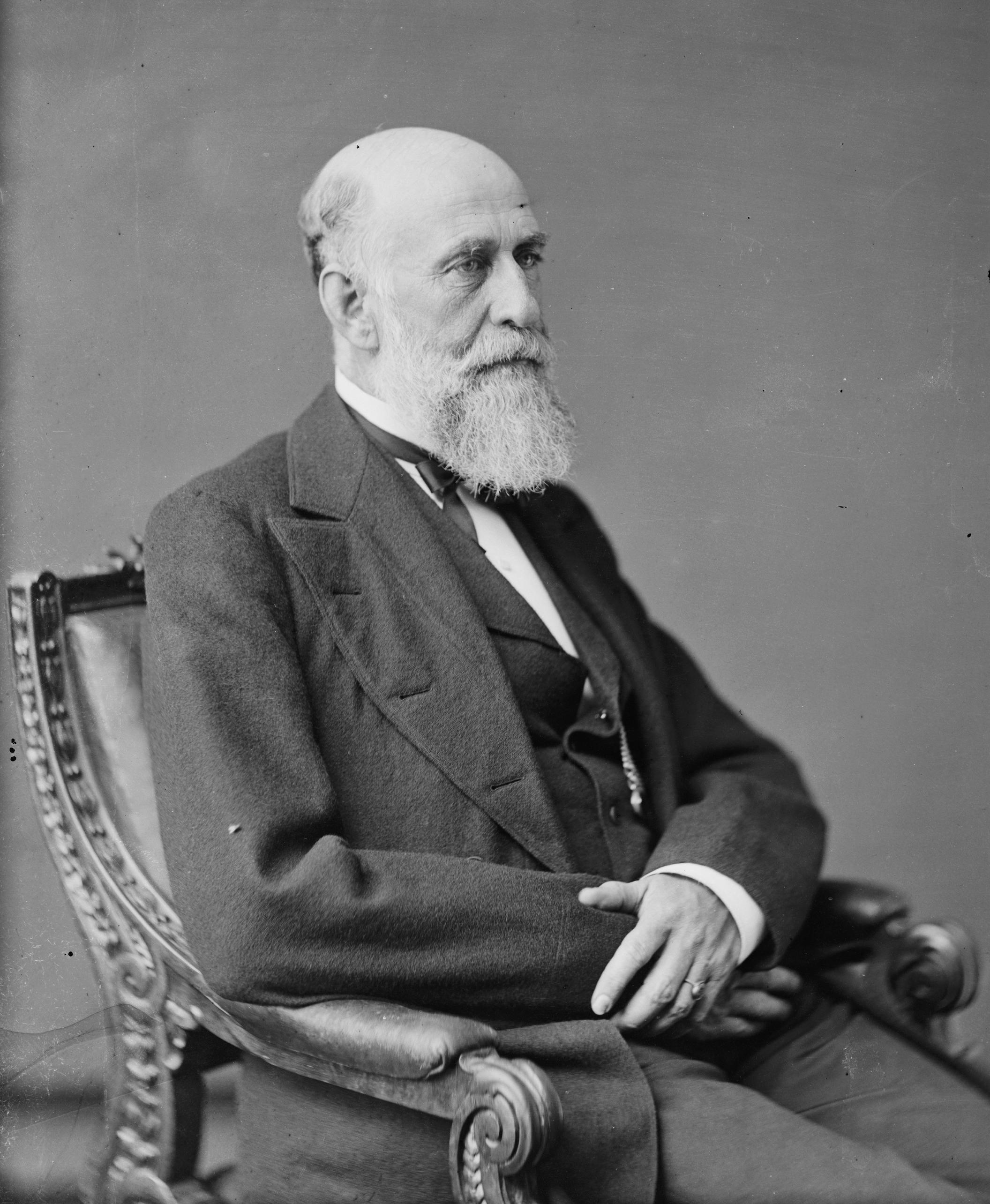
President pro tempore George F. Edmunds

=== House of Representatives ===
Representatives are preceded by their district numbers.

==== Alabama ====
▌1. Thomas H. Herndon (D), until March 28, 1883

▌James T. Jones (D), from December 3, 1883

▌2. Hilary A. Herbert (D)
▌3. William C. Oates (D)
▌4. Charles M. Shelley (D), until January 9, 1885

▌George H. Craig (R), from January 9, 1885

▌5. Thomas Williams (D)
▌6. Goldsmith W. Hewitt (D)
▌7. William H. Forney (D)
▌8. Luke Pryor (D)

==== Arkansas ====
▌1. Poindexter Dunn (D)
▌2. James K. Jones (D), until February 19, 1885
▌3. John H. Rogers (D)
▌4. Samuel W. Peel (D)
▌At-large. Clifton R. Breckinridge (D)

==== California ====
▌1. William S. Rosecrans (D)
▌2. James H. Budd (D)
▌3. Barclay Henley (D)
▌4. Pleasant B. Tully (D)
▌At-large. John R. Glascock (D)
▌At-large. Charles A. Sumner (D)

==== Colorado ====
▌At-large. James B. Belford (R)

==== Connecticut ====
▌1. William W. Eaton (D)
▌2. Charles L. Mitchell (D)
▌3. John T. Wait (R)
▌4. Edward W. Seymour (D)

==== Delaware ====
▌At-large. Charles B. Lore (D)

==== Florida ====
▌1. Robert H. M. Davidson (D)
▌2. Horatio Bisbee Jr. (R)

==== Georgia ====
▌1. John C. Nicholls (D)
▌2. Henry G. Turner (D)
▌3. Charles F. Crisp (D)
▌4. Hugh Buchanan (D)
▌5. Nathaniel J. Hammond (D)
▌6. James H. Blount (D)
▌7. Judson C. Clements (D)
▌8. Seaborn Reese (D)
▌9. Allen D. Candler (D)
▌At-large. Thomas Hardeman Jr. (D)

==== Illinois ====
▌1. Ransom W. Dunham (R)
▌2. John F. Finerty (ID)
▌3. George R. Davis (R)
▌4. George E. Adams (R)
▌5. Reuben Ellwood (R)
▌6. Robert R. Hitt (R)
▌7. Thomas J. Henderson (R)
▌8. William Cullen (R)
▌9. Lewis E. Payson (R)
▌10. Nicholas E. Worthington (D)
▌11. William H. Neece (D)
▌12. James M. Riggs (D)
▌13. William M. Springer (D)
▌14. Jonathan H. Rowell (R)
▌15. Joseph G. Cannon (R)
▌16. Aaron Shaw (D)
▌17. Samuel W. Moulton (D)
▌18. William R. Morrison (D)
▌19. Richard W. Townshend (D)
▌20. John R. Thomas (R)

==== Indiana ====
▌1. John J. Kleiner (D)
▌2. Thomas R. Cobb (D)
▌3. Strother M. Stockslager (D)
▌4. William S. Holman (D)
▌5. Courtland C. Matson (D)
▌6. Thomas M. Browne (R)
▌7. Stanton J. Peelle (R), until May 22, 1884

▌William E. English (D), from May 22, 1884

▌8. John E. Lamb (D)
▌9. Thomas B. Ward (D)
▌10. Thomas J. Wood (D)
▌11. George W. Steele (R)
▌12. Robert Lowry (D)
▌13. William H. Calkins (R), until October 20, 1884

▌Benjamin F. Shively (AM), from December 1, 1884

==== Iowa ====
▌1. Moses A. McCoid (R)
▌2. Jeremiah H. Murphy (D)
▌3. David B. Henderson (R)
▌4. Luman H. Weller (GB)
▌5. James Wilson (R), until March 3, 1885

▌Benjamin T. Frederick (D), from March 3, 1885

▌6. Marsena E. Cutts (R), until September 1, 1883

▌John C. Cook (D), from October 9, 1883

▌7. John A. Kasson (R), until July 13, 1884

▌Hiram Y. Smith (R), from December 2, 1884

▌8. William P. Hepburn (R)
▌9. William H. M. Pusey (D)
▌10. Adoniram J. Holmes (R)
▌11. Isaac S. Struble (R)

==== Kansas ====
▌1. John A. Anderson (R)
▌2. Dudley C. Haskell (R), until December 16, 1883

▌Edward H. Funston (R), from March 21, 1884

▌3. Thomas Ryan (R)
▌At-large. Lewis Hanback (R)
▌At-large. Edmund N. Morrill (R)
▌At-large. Bishop W. Perkins (R)
▌At-large. Samuel R. Peters (R)

==== Kentucky ====
▌1. Oscar Turner (ID)
▌2. James F. Clay (D)
▌3. John E. Halsell (D)
▌4. Thomas A. Robertson (D)
▌5. Albert S. Willis (D)
▌6. John G. Carlisle (D)
▌7. Joseph C. S. Blackburn (D)
▌8. Philip B. Thompson Jr. (D)
▌9. William W. Culbertson (R)
▌10. John D. White (R)
▌11. Frank L. Wolford (D)

==== Louisiana ====
▌1. Carleton Hunt (D)
▌2. E. John Ellis (D)
▌3. William Pitt Kellogg (R)
▌4. Newton C. Blanchard (D)
▌5. J. Floyd King (D)
▌6. Edward T. Lewis (D)

==== Maine ====
▌At-large. Charles A. Boutelle (R)
▌At-large. Nelson Dingley Jr. (R)
▌At-large. Seth L. Milliken (R)
▌At-large. Thomas B. Reed (R)

==== Maryland ====
▌1. George W. Covington (D)
▌2. J. Frederick C. Talbott (D)
▌3. Fetter S. Hoblitzell (D)
▌4. John V. L. Findlay (D)
▌5. Hart B. Holton (R)
▌6. Louis E. McComas (R)

==== Massachusetts ====
▌1. Robert T. Davis (R)
▌2. John D. Long (R)
▌3. Ambrose A. Ranney (R)
▌4. Patrick A. Collins (D)
▌5. Leopold Morse (D)
▌6. Henry B. Lovering (D)
▌7. Eben F. Stone (R)
▌8. William A. Russell (R)
▌9. Theodore Lyman (IR)
▌10. William W. Rice (R)
▌11. William Whiting (R)
▌12. George D. Robinson (R), until January 7, 1884

▌Francis W. Rockwell (R), from January 17, 1884

==== Michigan ====
▌1. William C. Maybury (D)
▌2. Nathaniel B. Eldredge (D)
▌3. Edward S. Lacey (R)
▌4. George L. Yaple (D)
▌5. Julius Houseman (D)
▌6. Edwin B. Winans (D)
▌7. Ezra C. Carleton (D)
▌8. Roswell G. Horr (R)
▌9. Byron M. Cutcheon (R)
▌10. Herschel H. Hatch (R)
▌11. Edward Breitung (R)

==== Minnesota ====
▌1. Milo White (R)
▌2. James B. Wakefield (R)
▌3. Horace B. Strait (R)
▌4. William D. Washburn (R)
▌5. Knute Nelson (R)

==== Mississippi ====
▌1. Henry L. Muldrow (D)
▌2. James R. Chalmers (I), from June 25, 1884
▌3. Elza Jeffords (R)
▌4. Hernando D. Money (D)
▌5. Otho R. Singleton (D)
▌6. Henry S. Van Eaton (D)
▌7. Ethelbert Barksdale (D)

==== Missouri ====
▌1. William H. Hatch (D)
▌2. Armstead M. Alexander (D)
▌3. Alexander M. Dockery (D)
▌4. James N. Burnes (D)
▌5. Alexander Graves (D)
▌6. John Cosgrove (D)
▌7. Aylett H. Buckner (D)
▌8. John J. O'Neill (D)
▌9. James O. Broadhead (D)
▌10. Martin L. Clardy (D)
▌11. Richard P. Bland (D)
▌12. Charles H. Morgan (D)
▌13. Robert W. Fyan (D)
▌14. Lowndes H. Davis (D)

==== Nebraska ====
▌1. Archibald J. Weaver (R)
▌2. James Laird (R)
▌3. Edward K. Valentine (R)

==== Nevada ====
▌At-large. George W. Cassidy (D)

==== New Hampshire ====
▌1. Martin A. Haynes (R)
▌2. Ossian Ray (R)

==== New Jersey ====
▌1. Thomas M. Ferrell (D)
▌2. J. Hart Brewer (R)
▌3. John Kean Jr. (R)
▌4. Benjamin F. Howey (R)
▌5. William W. Phelps (R)
▌6. William H. F. Fiedler (D)
▌7. William McAdoo (D)

==== New York ====
▌1. Perry Belmont (D)
▌2. William E. Robinson (D)
▌3. Darwin R. James (R)
▌4. Felix Campbell (D)
▌5. Nicholas Muller (D)
▌6. Samuel S. Cox (D)
▌7. William Dorsheimer (D)
▌8. John J. Adams (D)
▌9. John Hardy (D)
▌10. Abram S. Hewitt (D)
▌11. Orlando B. Potter (D)
▌12. Waldo Hutchins (D)
▌13. John H. Ketcham (R)
▌14. Lewis Beach (D)
▌15. John H. Bagley Jr. (D)
▌16. Thomas J. Van Alstyne (D)
▌17. Henry G. Burleigh (R)
▌18. Frederick A. Johnson (R)
▌19. Abraham X. Parker (R)
▌20. Edward Wemple (D)
▌21. George W. Ray (R)
▌22. Charles R. Skinner (R)
▌23. John T. Spriggs (D)
▌24. Newton W. Nutting (R)
▌25. Frank Hiscock (R)
▌26. Sereno E. Payne (R)
▌27. James W. Wadsworth (R)
▌28. Stephen C. Millard (R)
▌29. John Arnot Jr. (D)
▌30. Halbert S. Greenleaf (D)
▌31. Robert S. Stevens (D)
▌32. William F. Rogers (D)
▌33. Francis B. Brewer (R)
▌At-large. Henry W. Slocum (D)

==== North Carolina ====
▌1. Walter F. Pool (R), until August 25, 1883

▌Thomas G. Skinner (D), from November 20, 1883

▌2. James E. O'Hara (R)
▌3. Wharton J. Green (D)
▌4. William Ruffin Cox (D)
▌5. Alfred M. Scales (D), until December 30, 1884

▌James W. Reid (D), from January 28, 1885

▌6. Clement Dowd (D)
▌7. Tyre York (ID)
▌8. Robert B. Vance (D)
▌At-large. Risden T. Bennett (D)

==== Ohio ====
▌1. John F. Follett (D)
▌2. Isaac M. Jordan (D)
▌3. Robert M. Murray (D)
▌4. Benjamin Le Fevre (D)
▌5. George E. Seney (D)
▌6. William D. Hill (D)
▌7. Henry L. Morey (R), until June 20, 1884

▌James E. Campbell (D), from June 20, 1884

▌8. J. Warren Keifer (R)
▌9. James S. Robinson (R), until January 12, 1885
▌10. Frank H. Hurd (D)
▌11. John W. McCormick (R)
▌12. Alphonso Hart (R)
▌13. George L. Converse (D)
▌14. George W. Geddes (D)
▌15. Adoniram J. Warner (D)
▌16. Beriah Wilkins (D)
▌17. Joseph D. Taylor (R)
▌18. William McKinley (R), until May 27, 1884

▌Jonathan H. Wallace (D), from May 27, 1884

▌19. Ezra B. Taylor (R)
▌20. David R. Paige (D)
▌21. Martin A. Foran (D)

==== Oregon ====
▌At-large. Melvin C. George (R)

==== Pennsylvania ====
▌1. Henry H. Bingham (R)
▌2. Charles O'Neill (R)
▌3. Samuel J. Randall (D)
▌4. William D. Kelley (R)
▌5. Alfred C. Harmer (R)
▌6. James B. Everhart (R)
▌7. I. Newton Evans (R)
▌8. Daniel Ermentrout (D)
▌9. A. Herr Smith (R)
▌10. William Mutchler (D)
▌11. John B. Storm (D)
▌12. Daniel W. Connolly (D)
▌13. Charles N. Brumm (GB)
▌14. Samuel F. Barr (R)
▌15. George A. Post (D)
▌16. William W. Brown (R)
▌17. Jacob M. Campbell (R)
▌18. Louis E. Atkinson (R)
▌19. William A. Duncan (D), until November 14, 1884

▌John A. Swope (D), from December 23, 1884

▌20. Andrew G. Curtin (D)
▌21. Charles E. Boyle (D)
▌22. James H. Hopkins (D)
▌23. Thomas M. Bayne (R)
▌24. George V. Lawrence (R)
▌25. John D. Patton (D)
▌26. Samuel H. Miller (R)
▌27. Samuel M. Brainerd (R)
▌At-large. Mortimer F. Elliott (D)

==== Rhode Island ====
▌1. Henry J. Spooner (R)
▌2. Jonathan Chace (R), until January 26, 1885

▌Nathan F. Dixon III (R), from February 12, 1885

==== South Carolina ====
▌1. Samuel Dibble (D)
▌2. George D. Tillman (D)
▌3. D. Wyatt Aiken (D)
▌4. John H. Evins (D), until October 20, 1884

▌John Bratton (D), from December 8, 1884

▌5. John J. Hemphill (D)
▌6. George W. Dargan (D)
▌7. Edmund W. M. Mackey (R), until January 27, 1884

▌Robert Smalls (R), from March 18, 1884

==== Tennessee ====
▌1. Augustus H. Pettibone (R)
▌2. Leonidas C. Houk (R)
▌3. George G. Dibrell (D)
▌4. Benton McMillin (D)
▌5. Richard Warner (D)
▌6. Andrew J. Caldwell (D)
▌7. John G. Ballentine (D)
▌8. John M. Taylor (D)
▌9. Rice A. Pierce (D)
▌10. H. Casey Young (D)

==== Texas ====
▌1. Charles Stewart (D)
▌2. John H. Reagan (D)
▌3. James H. Jones (D)
▌4. David B. Culberson (D)
▌5. James W. Throckmorton (D)
▌6. Olin Wellborn (D)
▌7. Thomas P. Ochiltree (I)
▌8. James F. Miller (D)
▌9. Roger Q. Mills (D)
▌10. John Hancock (D)
▌11. Samuel W. T. Lanham (D)

==== Vermont ====
▌1. John W. Stewart (R)
▌2. Luke P. Poland (R)

==== Virginia ====
▌1. Robert M. Mayo (RA), until March 20, 1884

▌George T. Garrison (D), from March 20, 1884

▌2. Harry Libbey (RA)
▌3. George D. Wise (D)
▌4. Benjamin S. Hooper (RA)
▌5. George Cabell (D)
▌6. John R. Tucker (D)
▌7. John Paul (D), until September 5, 1883

▌Charles T. O'Ferrall (D), from May 5, 1884

▌8. John S. Barbour Jr. (D)
▌9. Henry Bowen (RA)
▌At-large. John S. Wise (RA)

==== West Virginia ====
▌1. Nathan Goff (R)
▌2. William L. Wilson (D)
▌3. John E. Kenna (D), until March 4, 1883

▌Charles P. Snyder (D), from May 15, 1883

▌4. Eustace Gibson (D)

==== Wisconsin ====
▌1. John Winans (D)
▌2. Daniel H. Sumner (D)
▌3. Burr W. Jones (D)
▌4. Peter V. Deuster (D)
▌5. Joseph Rankin (D)
▌6. Richard W. Guenther (R)
▌7. Gilbert M. Woodward (D)
▌8. William T. Price (R)
▌9. Isaac Stephenson (R)

==== Non-voting members ====
▌Arizona Territory. Granville H. Oury (D)
▌Dakota Territory. John B. Raymond (R)
▌Idaho Territory. Theodore F. Singiser (R)
▌Montana Territory. Martin Maginnis (D)
▌New Mexico Territory. Tranqulino Luna (R), until March 5, 1884

▌Francisco A. Manzanares (D), from March 5, 1884

▌Utah Territory. John T. Caine (D)
▌Washington Territory. Thomas H. Brents (R)
▌Wyoming Territory. Morton E. Post (D)

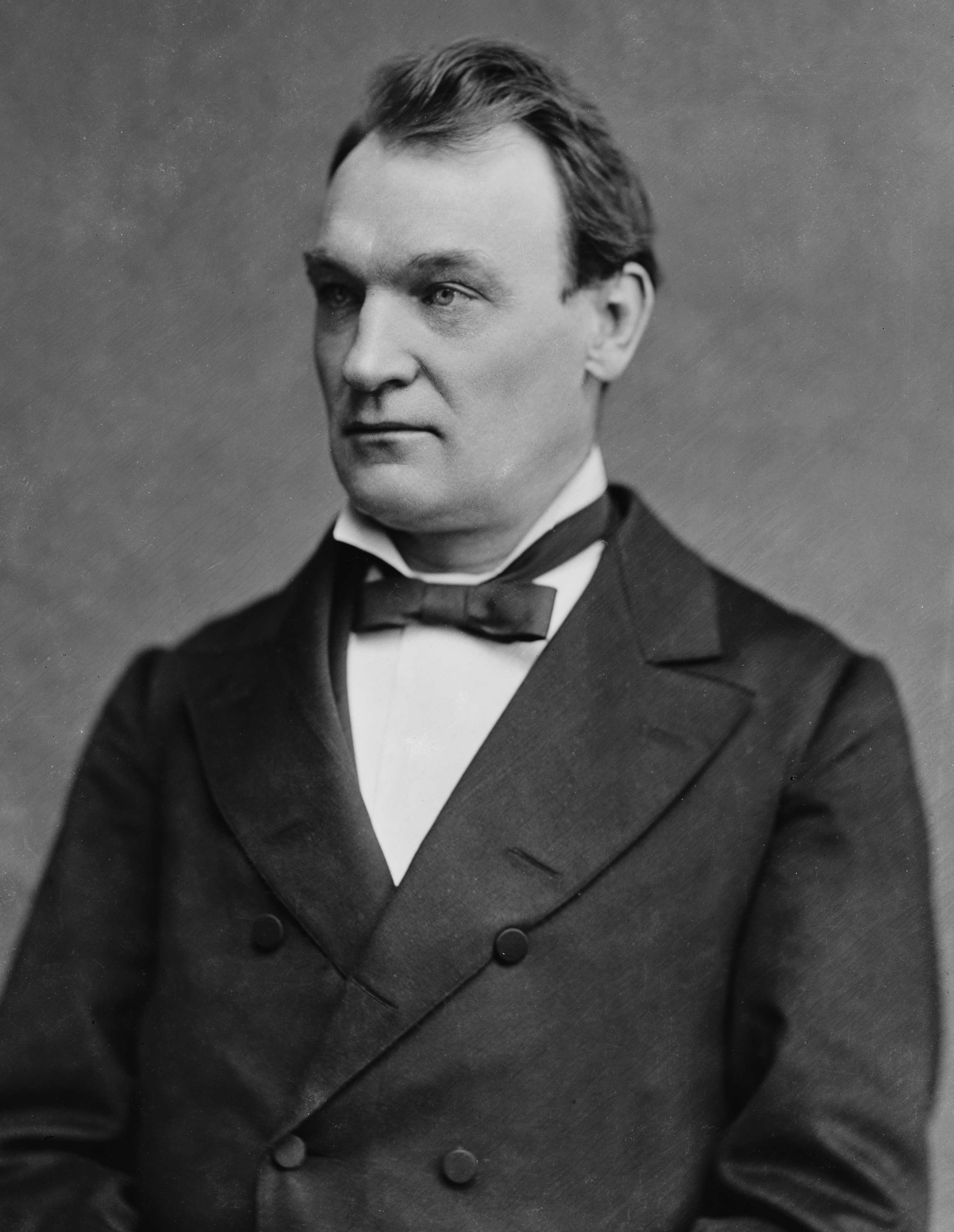
Speaker of the House John G. Carlisle

== Changes in membership ==
The count below reflects changes from the beginning of the first session of this Congress.

=== Senate ===
- Replacements: 1
  - Democratic: no net change
  - Republican: 1 seat net gain
  - Liberal Republican: 1 seat net loss
- Deaths: 1
- Resignations: 0
- Interim appointment: 1
- Late election: 1
- Total seats with changes: 3

Senate changes
State (class)	Vacated by	Reason for change	Successor	Date of successor's formal installation (Note: When seated or oath administered, not necessarily when service began.)
New Hampshire (2)	Vacant	Legislature had failed to elect. Senator elected August 2, 1883.	Austin F. Pike (R)	August 2, 1883
Rhode Island (2)	Henry B. Anthony (R)	Incumbent died September 2, 1884. Successor appointed November 19, 1884.	William P. Sheffield (R)	November 19, 1884
Rhode Island (2)	William P. Sheffield (R)	Interim appointee replaced by successor elected January 20, 1885.	Jonathan Chace (R)	January 20, 1885

=== House of Representatives ===
- Replacements: 15
  - Democratic: 1 seat net gain
  - Republican: 1 seat net loss
  - National Greenback: 1 seat net gain
- Deaths: 9
- Resignations: 9
- Contested election: 8
- Total seats with changes: 25

House changes
District	Vacated by	Reason for change	Successor	Date of successor's formal installation
Mississippi 2nd	Vacant	Chalmers took seat after an election contest with Van H. Manning who challenged his election	James R. Chalmers (I)	June 25, 1884
West Virginia 3rd	John E. Kenna (D)	Resigned March 4, 1883, when elected U.S. Senator.	Charles P. Snyder (D)	May 15, 1883
Alabama 1st	Thomas H. Herndon (D)	Died March 28, 1883.	James T. Jones (D)	December 3, 1883
Iowa 6th	Marsena E. Cutts (R)	Died September 1, 1883.	John C. Cook (D)	October 9, 1883
Virginia 7th	John Paul (D)	Resigned September 5, 1883, to become judge of the U.S. District Court of the Western District of Virginia. The House election was subsequently contested.	Charles T. O'Ferrall (D)	May 5, 1884
Kansas 2nd	Dudley C. Haskell (R)	Died December 16, 1883.	Edward H. Funston (R)	March 21, 1884
North Carolina 1st	Walter F. Pool (R)	Died August 25, 1883.	Thomas G. Skinner (D)	November 20, 1883
Massachusetts 12th	George D. Robinson (R)	Resigned January 7, 1884, when elected Governor of Massachusetts.	Francis W. Rockwell (R)	January 17, 1884
South Carolina 7th	Edmund W. M. Mackey (R)	Died January 27, 1884.	Robert Smalls (R)	March 18, 1884
New Mexico Territory At-large	Tranquilino Luna (R)	Lost contested election March 5, 1884.	Francisco A. Manzanares (D)	March 5, 1884
Virginia 1st	Robert M. Mayo (RA)	Lost contested election March 20, 1884.	George T. Garrison (D)	March 20, 1884
Indiana 7th	Stanton J. Peelle (R)	Lost contested election May 22, 1884.	William E. English (D)	May 22, 1884
Ohio 18th	William McKinley (R)	Lost contested election May 27, 1884.	Jonathan H. Wallace (D)	May 27, 1884
Ohio 7th	Henry L. Morey (R)	Lost contested election June 20, 1884.	James E. Campbell (D)	June 20, 1884
Iowa 7th	John A. Kasson (R)	Resigned July 13, 1884, to become U.S. Minister to Germany.	Hiram Y. Smith (R)	December 2, 1884
Indiana 13th	William H. Calkins (R)	Resigned October 20, 1884.	Benjamin F. Shively (AM)	December 1, 1884
South Carolina 4th	John H. Evins (D)	Died October 20, 1884.	John Bratton (D)	December 8, 1884
Pennsylvania 19th	William A. Duncan (D)	Died November 14, 1884.	John A. Swope (D)	December 23, 1884
North Carolina 5th	Alfred M. Scales (D)	Resigned December 30, 1884, when elected Governor of North Carolina.	James W. Reid (D)	January 28, 1885
Alabama 4th	Charles M. Shelley (D)	Lost contested election January 9, 1885.	George H. Craig (R)	January 9, 1885
Ohio 9th	James S. Robinson (R)	Resigned January 12, 1885, to become Ohio Secretary of State.	Vacant	Not filled this term
Rhode Island 2nd	Jonathan Chace (R)	Resigned January 26, 1885, when elected U.S. Senator.	Nathan F. Dixon III (R)	February 12, 1885
Arkansas 2nd	James K. Jones (D)	Resigned February 19, 1885, when elected U.S. Senator.	Vacant	Not filled this term
Iowa 5th	James Wilson (R)	Lost contested election March 3, 1885.	Benjamin T. Frederick (D)	March 3, 1885

== Committees ==
Lists of committees and their party leaders for members of the House and Senate committees can be found through the Official Congressional Directory at the bottom of this article. The directory after the pages of terms of service lists committees of the Senate, House (Standing with Subcommittees, Select and Special) and Joint and, after that, House/Senate committee assignments. On the committees section of the House and Senate in the Official Congressional Directory, the committee's members on the first row on the left side shows the chairman of the committee and on the right side shows the ranking member of the committee.

=== Senate ===
- Additional Accommodations for the Library of Congress (Select) (Chairman: Daniel W. Voorhees; Ranking Member: Justin S. Morrill)
- Agriculture and Forestry (Chairman: Warner Miller; Ranking Member: James Z. George)
- Appropriations (Chairman: William B. Allison; Ranking Member: James B. Beck)
- Audit and Control the Contingent Expenses of the Senate (Chairman: John P. Jones; Ranking Member: Zebulon B. Vance)
- Civil Service and Retrenchment (Chairman: Joseph R. Hawley; Ranking Member: James D. Walker)
- Claims (Chairman: Angus Cameron; Ranking Member: Howell E. Jackson)
- Commerce (Chairman: Samuel J. R. McMillan; Ranking Member: Matt W. Ransom)
- Distributing Public Revenue Among the States (Select)
- District of Columbia (Chairman: John J. Ingalls; Ranking Member: Isham G. Harris)
- Education and Labor (Chairman: Henry W. Blair; Ranking Member: Richard Coke)
- Engrossed Bills (Chairman: Eli Saulsbury; Ranking Member: William B. Allison)
- Enrolled Bills (Chairman: William J. Sewell; Ranking Member: Alfred H. Colquitt)
- Epidemic Diseases (Select) (Chairman: Isham G. Harris; Ranking Member: William J. Sewell)
- Examine the Several Branches in the Civil Service (Select) (Chairman: Shelby M. Cullom; Ranking Member: Wade Hampton III)
- Expenditures of Public Money (Chairman: James F. Wilson; Ranking Member: James B. Beck)
- Finance (Chairman: Justin S. Morrill; Ranking Member: Thomas F. Bayard)
- Fisheries (Chairman: Elbridge G. Lapham; Ranking Member: John T. Morgan)
- Foreign Relations (Chairman: John F. Miller; Ranking Member: John T. Morgan)
- Indian Affairs (Chairman: Henry L. Dawes; Ranking Member: Richard Coke)
- Judiciary (Chairman: George F. Edmunds; Ranking Member: Augustus H. Garland)
- Library (Chairman: John Sherman; Ranking Member: Daniel W. Voorhees)
- Manufactures (Chairman: Harrison H. Riddleberger; Ranking Member: John S. Williams)
- Military Affairs (Chairman: John A. Logan; Ranking Member: Francis M. Cockrell)
- Mines and Mining (Chairman: Thomas M. Bowen; Ranking Member: Wade Hampton III)
- Mississippi River and its Tributaries (Select) (Chairman: Charles H. Van Wyck; Ranking Member: Benjamin F. Jonas)
- Naval Affairs (Chairman: J. Donald Cameron; Ranking Member: John R. McPherson)
- Nicaraguan Claims (Select) (Chairman: Samuel B. Maxey; Ranking Member: Nathaniel P. Hill)
- Ordnance and War Ships (Select)
- Patents (Chairman: Orville H. Platt; Ranking Member: Richard Coke)
- Pensions (Chairman: John I. Mitchell; Ranking Member: James H. Slater)
- Post Office and Post Roads (Chairman: Nathaniel P. Hill; Ranking Member: Samuel B. Maxey)
- Potomac River Front (Select)
- Printing (Chairman: Charles F. Manderson; Ranking Member: N/A)
- Private Land Claims (Chairman: Thomas F. Bayard; Ranking Member: George F. Edmunds)
- Privileges and Elections (Chairman: George F. Hoar; Ranking Member: Eli Saulsbury)
- Public Buildings and Grounds (Chairman: William Mahone; Ranking Member: Charles W. Jones)
- Public Lands (Chairman: Preston B. Plumb; Ranking Member: James H. Slater)
- Railroads (Chairman: Philetus Sawyer; Ranking Member: Lucius Quintus Cincinnatus Lamar II)
- Revision of the Laws (Chairman: Omar D. Conger; Ranking Member: George H. Pendleton)
- Revolutionary Claims (Chairman: Charles W. Jones; Ranking Member: Henry B. Anthony then Samuel J.R. McMillan)
- Rules (Chairman: William P. Frye; Ranking Member: Isham G. Harris)
- Sioux and Crow Indians (Select)
- Steel Producing Capacity of the United States (Select)
- Tariff Regulation (Select)
- Tenth Census (Select) (Chairman: Eugene Hale; Ranking Member: George H. Pendleton)
- Territories (Chairman: Benjamin Harrison; Ranking Member: Matthew C. Butler)
- Transportation Routes to the Seaboard (Chairman: Nelson W. Aldrich; Ranking Member: James T. Farley)
- Whole
- Woman Suffrage (Select) (Chairman: Francis M. Cockrell; Ranking Member: Henry W. Blair)

=== House of Representatives ===
- Accounts (Chairman: George W. Covington; Ranking Member: J. Hart Brewer)
- Agriculture (Chairman: William H. Hatch; Ranking Member: John D. Patton)
- Alcoholic Liquor Traffic (Select) (Chairman: William D. Cox; Ranking Member: N/A)
- American Ship building (Select)
- Appropriations (Chairman: Samuel J. Randall; Ranking Member: J. Warren Keifer)
- Banking and Currency (Chairman: Aylett H. Buckner; Ranking Member: George L. Yaple)
- Boynton Investigation (Select)
- Claims (Chairman: Benton McMillin; Ranking Member: Charles P. Snyder)
- Coinage, Weights and Measures (Chairman: Richard P. Bland; Ranking Member: Pleasant B. Tully)
- Commerce (Chairman: John H. Reagan; Ranking Member: Ethelbert Barksdale)
- District of Columbia (Chairman: John S. Barbour; Ranking Member: Samuel F. Barr)
- Education (Chairman: D. Wyatt Aiken; Ranking Member: John Winans)
- Elections (Chairman: Henry G. Turner; Ranking Member: John J. Adams)
- Enrolled Bills (Chairman: William H. Neece; Ranking Member: Adoniram J. Holmes)
- Expenditures in the Interior Department (Chairman: Casey Young; Ranking Member: Charles N. Brumm)
- Expenditures in the Justice Department (Chairman: William M. Springer; Ranking Member: Henry Bowen)
- Expenditures in the Navy Department (Chairman: Leopold Morse; Ranking Member: Leonidas C. Houk)
- Expenditures in the Post Office Department (Chairman: Charles H. Morgan; Ranking Member: Stanton J. Peelle)
- Expenditures in the State Department (Chairman: Thomas Hardeman; Ranking Member: Samuel F. Barr)
- Expenditures in the Treasury Department (Chairman: Lowndes H. Davis; Ranking Member: Edward S. Lacey)
- Expenditures in the War Department (Chairman: Philip B. Thompson; Ranking Member: Robert M. Mayo)
- Expenditures on Public Buildings (Chairman: Perry Belmont; Ranking Member: Alfred C. Harmer)
- Foreign Affairs (Chairman: Andrew G. Curtin; Ranking Member: John E. Lamb)
- Indian Affairs (Chairman: Olin Wellborn; Ranking Member: Thomas G. Skinner)
- Invalid Pensions (Chairman: Courtland C. Matson; Ranking Member: John H. Bagley Jr.)
- Judiciary (Chairman: John R. Tucker; Ranking Member: William C. Maybury)
- Labor (Chairman: James H. Hopkins; Ranking Member: Henry B. Lovering)
- Levees and Improvements of the Mississippi River (Chairman: J. Floyd King; Ranking Member: Barclay Henley)
- Manufactures (Chairman: John H. Bagley Jr.; Ranking Member: Robert M. Murray)
- Mileage (Chairman: Samuel W. Moulton; Ranking Member: Ambrose A. Ranney)
- Military Affairs (Chairman: William S. Rosecrans; Ranking Member: William A. Duncan)
- Militia (Chairman: Nicholas Muller; Ranking Member: John G. Ballentine)
- Mines and Mining (Chairman: Richard Warner; Ranking Member: Robert S. Stevens)
- Naval Affairs (Chairman: Samuel S. Cox; Ranking Member: William McAdoo)
- Pacific Railroads (Chairman: George W. Cassidy; Ranking Member: George A. Post)
- Patents (Chairman: Robert B. Vance; Ranking Member: John Winans)
- Pensions (Chairman: Goldsmith W. Hewitt; Ranking Member: Frank L. Wolford)
- Post Office and Post Roads (Chairman: Hernando D. Money; Ranking Member: David R. Paige)
- Private Land Claims (Chairman: Henry L. Muldrow; Ranking Member: Robert Lowry)
- Public Buildings and Grounds (Chairman: Strother M. Stockslager; Ranking Member: Nicholas E. Worthington)
- Public Lands (Chairman: Thomas R. Cobb; Ranking Member: Henry S. Van Eaton)
- Railways and Canals (Chairman: Robert H. M. Davidson; Ranking Member: Edward Wemple)
- Revision of Laws (Chairman: William C. Oates; Ranking Member: John J. Hemphill)
- Rivers and Harbors (Chairman: Albert S. Willis; Ranking Member: Julius Houseman)
- Rules (Chairman: John G. Carlisle; Ranking Member: J. Warren Keifer)
- Standards of Official Conduct
- Territories (Chairman: Luke Pryor; Ranking Member: Martin A. Foran)
- War Claims (Chairman: George W. Geddes; Ranking Member: Thomas M. Ferrell)
- Ways and Means (Chairman: William R. Morrison; Ranking Member: William D. Kelley)
- Whole

=== Joint committees ===
- Conditions of Indian Tribes (Special)
- Enrolled Bills (Chairman: Sen. William J. Sewell; Vice Chairman: Rep. Alfred H. Colquitt)
- The Library (Chairman: Sen. John Sherman; Vice Chairman: Rep. Daniel W. Voorhees)
- Printing (Chairman: Sen. Henry B. Anthony then Joseph R. Hawley; Vice Chairman: Rep. Arthur P. Gorman)
- Public Buildings and Grounds (Chairman: Sen. William Mahone; Vice Chairman: Rep. Charles W. Jones)
- Scientific Bureaus

== Caucuses ==
- Democratic (House)
- Democratic (Senate)

== Employees ==
=== Legislative branch agency directors ===
- Architect of the Capitol: Edward Clark
- Librarian of Congress: Ainsworth Rand Spofford
- Public Printer of the United States: Sterling P. Rounds

=== Senate ===
- Chaplain: Joseph J. Bullock (Presbyterian), to December 18, 1883
  - Elias D. Huntley (Methodist), from December 18, 1883
- Librarian: P. J. Pierce, to 1884
  - George M. Weston, from 1884
- Secretary: Francis E. Shober (Acting), to December 18, 1883
  - Anson G. McCook, from December 18, 1883
- Sergeant at Arms: Richard J. Bright, to December 18, 1883
  - William P. Canady, from December 18, 1883

=== House of Representatives ===
- Chaplain: Frederick D. Power (Disciples of Christ), until December 3, 1883
  - John S. Lindsay (Episcopalian), elected December 3, 1883
- Clerk: John B. Clark Jr., elected December 3, 1883
- Clerk at the Speaker's Table: Nathaniel T. Crutchfield
- Doorkeeper: James G. Wintersmith, elected December 3, 1883
- Postmaster: Lycurgus Dalton, elected December 3, 1883
- Reading Clerks:
  - T.O. Walker (D)
  - Neill S. Brown Jr. (R) along with John S. Kenyon (R) (until December 1883)
- Sergeant at Arms: George W. Hooker, until December 4, 1883
  - John P. Leedom, from December 4, 1883

== See also ==
- 1882 United States elections (elections leading to this Congress)
  - 1882–83 United States Senate elections
  - 1882 United States House of Representatives elections
- 1884 United States elections (elections during this Congress, leading to the next Congress)
  - 1884 United States presidential election
  - 1884–85 United States Senate elections
  - 1884 United States House of Representatives elections
