= Mariano S. Otero =

American politician

Jose Mariano Sabino Otero
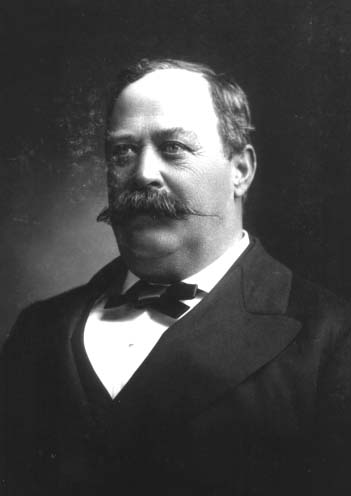

Member of the U.S. House of Representatives from New Mexico Territory's At-large district
- In office March 4, 1879 – March 3, 1881 (Delegate)
- Preceded by: Trinidad Romero
- Succeeded by: Tranquilino Luna

Personal details
- Born: August 29, 1844 Peralta, Mexican Republic (now Valencia County, New Mexico, United States
- Died: February 1, 1904 (aged 59) Albuquerque, New Mexico Territory
- Party: Republican
- Education: Saint Louis University
- Occupation: businessman, banker, politician, judge

Mariano Sabino Otero (August 29, 1844 – February 1, 1904) was a Congressional delegate from the Territory of New Mexico, nephew of Miguel Antonio Otero (I) and cousin of Miguel Antonio Otero (II).

Born in Peralta, New Mexico, Otero attended private and parochial schools and Saint Louis University. He engaged in commercial pursuits and stock raising, and subsequently became a banker. He was probate judge of Bernalillo County in 1871–1879. He was also nominated by the Democratic State convention as a candidate for Delegate to the Forty-fourth Congress, but declined.

Otero was elected as a Republican to the Forty-sixth Congress (March 4, 1879 – March 3, 1881). He declined to be a candidate for renomination in 1880, but instead engaged in his former business pursuits.

Otero served as commissioner of Bernalillo County in 1884–1886. He was an unsuccessful candidate for election in 1888 to the Fifty-first Congress and in 1890 to the Fifty-second Congress. He moved to Albuquerque, New Mexico, in 1889, and was interested in the manufacture of sulphur and engaged in banking. He died in Albuquerque, and was interred in Santa Barbara Cemetery.

== See also ==
- List of Hispanic Americans in the United States Congress

== Sources ==
- United States Congress. "Mariano S. Otero (id: O000124)". Biographical Directory of the United States Congress.

U.S. House of Representatives
Preceded by Trinidad Romero	Delegate to the U.S. House of Representatives from New Mexico; 1879-1881	Succeeded by Tranquilino Luna
