= List of Hispanic and Latino Americans in the United States Congress =

This is a list of Hispanic and Latino Americans who have served in the United States Congress. Persons included are identified as having a lineage from Spain or Latin America, a definition that includes Brazil, but not Portugal.

Entries shaded in gray refer to current members of the U.S. Congress.

== Senate ==
Name (lifespan)	Ancestry	Party	State	Start	End	Notes
Dominique Bouligny (1773–1833)	Spanish	Democratic-Republican (1824–1828)	Louisiana	Nov 19, 1824	Mar 4, 1829	Retired
Dominique Bouligny (1773–1833)	Spanish	National Republican (1828–1829)	Louisiana	Nov 19, 1824	Mar 4, 1829	Retired
David Levy Yulee (1810–1886)	Spanish	Democratic	Florida	Jul 1, 1845	Mar 4, 1851	Lost reelection
David Levy Yulee (1810–1886)	Spanish	Democratic	Florida	Mar 4, 1855	Jan 21, 1861	Resigned when Florida seceded from the Union
Judah P. Benjamin (1811–1884)	Spanish	Whig (1853–1856)	Louisiana	Mar 4, 1853	Feb 4, 1861	Resigned when Louisiana seceded from the Union
Judah P. Benjamin (1811–1884)	Spanish	Democratic (1856–1861)	Louisiana	Mar 4, 1853	Feb 4, 1861	Resigned when Louisiana seceded from the Union
Stephen Mallory II (1848–1907)	Spanish	Democratic	Florida	May 15, 1897	Dec 23, 1907	Died in office
Octaviano Larrazolo (Note: Larrazolo was the first person born in Latin America to serve in the U.S. Senate.) (1859–1930)	Mexican	Republican	New Mexico	Dec 7, 1928	Mar 4, 1929	Retired
Dennis Chávez (1888–1962)	Mexican	Democratic	New Mexico	May 11, 1935	Nov 18, 1962	Died in office
Thomas M. Storke (1876–1971)	Mexican	Democratic	California	Nov 9, 1938	Jan 3, 1939	Retired
Joseph Montoya (1915–1978)	Mexican	Democratic	New Mexico	Nov 4, 1964	Jan 3, 1977	Lost reelection
John E. Sununu (born 1964)	Salvadoran	Republican	New Hampshire	Jan 3, 2003	Jan 3, 2009	Lost reelection
Mel Martínez (Note: Martínez previously served as United States Secretary of Housing and Urban Development.) (born 1946)	Cuban	Republican	Florida	Jan 3, 2005	Sep 9, 2009	Resigned
Ken Salazar (born 1955)	Mexican	Democratic	Colorado	Jan 3, 2005	Jan 20, 2009	Resigned to become U.S. Secretary of the Interior
Bob Menendez (born 1954)	Cuban	Democratic	New Jersey	Jan 17, 2006	Aug 20, 2024	Resigned after bribery conviction
Marco Rubio (born 1971)	Cuban	Republican	Florida	Jan 3, 2011	Jan 20, 2025	Resigned to become U.S. Secretary of State
Ted Cruz (born 1970)	Cuban	Republican	Texas	Jan 3, 2013	Incumbent	
Catherine Cortez Masto (Note: Cortez Masto is the first Latina to serve in the U.S. Senate.) (born 1964)	Mexican	Democratic	Nevada	Jan 3, 2017	Incumbent	
Ben Ray Luján (born 1972)	Mexican	Democratic	New Mexico	Jan 3, 2021	Incumbent	
Alex Padilla (born 1973)	Mexican	Democratic	California	Jan 20, 2021	Incumbent	
Ruben Gallego (born 1979)	Colombian, Mexican	Democratic	Arizona	Jan 3, 2025	Incumbent	
Bernie Moreno (born 1967)	Colombian	Republican	Ohio	Jan 3, 2025	Incumbent	

=== Elected to the Senate, but not seated ===
Name (lifespan)	Ancestry	Party	State	Year elected	Notes
Charles Gayarré (1805–1895)	Spanish	Democratic	Louisiana	1834	Prior to being seated, resigned due to ill health

== House of Representatives ==
Name (lifespan)	Ancestry	Party	State	Start	End	Notes
Alcée la Branche (1806–1881)	Spanish	Democratic	Louisiana	Mar 4, 1843	Mar 4, 1845	Retired
John Edward Bouligny (1824–1864)	Spanish	American (Know-Nothing) (1859–1860)	Louisiana	Mar 4, 1859	Mar 4, 1861	Retired (Note: Bouligny was the only congressman from Louisiana not to resign when the state seceded from the Union.)
John Edward Bouligny (1824–1864)	Spanish	Constitutional Union (1860–1861)	Louisiana	Mar 4, 1859	Mar 4, 1861	Retired
Romualdo Pacheco (Note: Pacheco was the first Latino to serve in Congress, and he previously served as the first (and, to date, only) Hispanic governor of the State of California.) (1831–1899)	Mexican	Republican	California	Mar 4, 1877	Feb 7, 1878	Lost election contestation
Romualdo Pacheco (1831–1899)	Mexican	Republican	California	Mar 4, 1879	Mar 4, 1883	Retired
Stephen Mallory II (1848–1907)	Spanish	Democratic	Florida	Mar 4, 1891	Mar 4, 1895	Retired
Frank Coombs (1853–1934)	Mexican	Republican	California	Mar 4, 1901	Mar 4, 1903	Lost reelection
Albert Estopinal (1845–1919)	Spanish	Democratic	Louisiana	Nov 3, 1908	Apr 28, 1919	Died in office
Ladislas Lazaro (1872–1927)	Spanish	Democratic	Louisiana	Mar 4, 1913	Mar 30, 1927	Died in office
Benigno C. Hernández (1862–1954)	Mexican	Republican	New Mexico	Mar 4, 1915	Mar 4, 1917	Lost reelection
Benigno C. Hernández (1862–1954)	Mexican	Republican	New Mexico	Mar 4, 1919	Mar 4, 1921	Retired
Néstor Montoya (1862–1923)	Mexican	Republican	New Mexico	Mar 4, 1921	Jan 13, 1923	Died in office
Dennis Chávez (1888–1962)	Mexican	Democratic	New Mexico	Mar 4, 1931	Jan 3, 1935	Retired to run unsuccessfully for the U.S. Senate from New Mexico (Note: Chávez later was appointed as United States Senator from New Mexico.)
Joachim O. Fernández (1896–1978)	Spanish	Democratic	Louisiana	Mar 4, 1931	Jan 3, 1941	Lost reelection
Antonio M. Fernández (1902–1956)	Mexican	Democratic	New Mexico	Jan 3, 1943	Nov 7, 1956	Died in office
Joseph Montoya (1915–1978)	Mexican	Democratic	New Mexico	Apr 9, 1957	Nov 3, 1964	Retired to run successfully for the U.S. Senate from New Mexico
Henry B. González (1916–2000)	Mexican	Democratic	Texas	Nov 4, 1961	Jan 3, 1999	Retired
Thomas Gill (1922–2009)	Cuban	Democratic	Hawaii	Jan 3, 1963	Jan 3, 1965	Retired to run unsuccessfully for the U.S. Senate from Hawaii
Edward R. Roybal (1916–2005)	Mexican	Democratic	California	Jan 3, 1963	Jan 3, 1993	Retired
Kika de la Garza (1927–2017)	Mexican	Democratic	Texas	Jan 3, 1965	Jan 3, 1997	Retired
Manuel Lujan (1928–2019)	Mexican	Republican	New Mexico	Jan 3, 1969	Jan 3, 1989	Retired (Note: Lujan later served as United States Secretary of the Interior.)
Herman Badillo (1929–2014)	Puerto Rican	Democratic	New York	Jan 3, 1971	Dec 31, 1977	Resigned to become Deputy Mayor of New York City
Charles Rangel (1930–2025)	Puerto Rican	Democratic	New York	Jan 3, 1971	Jan 3, 2017	Retired
Robert Garcia (1933–2017)	Puerto Rican	Democratic (Note: Garcia was elected under the Republican and Liberal Party ballot lines in the special election for his first term, but caucused with the Democrats upon taking his seat.)	New York	Feb 21, 1978	Jan 7, 1990	Resigned (Note: Garcia later was jailed due to the Wedtech scandal, but his conviction ultimately was reversed by an appellate court.)
Matthew G. Martínez (1929–2011)	Mexican	Democratic (1982–2000).	California	Jul 13, 1982	Jan 3, 2001	Lost renomination as a Democrat and joined the Republican Party
Matthew G. Martínez (1929–2011)	Mexican	Republican (2000–2001)	California	Jul 13, 1982	Jan 3, 2001	Lost renomination as a Democrat and joined the Republican Party
Solomon P. Ortiz (born 1937)	Mexican	Democratic	Texas	Jan 3, 1983	Jan 3, 2011	Lost reelection
Bill Richardson (1947–2023)	Mexican	Democratic	New Mexico	Jan 3, 1983	Feb 13, 1997	Resigned to become U.S. Ambassador to the United Nations (Note: Richardson later served as United States Secretary of Energy and Governor of New Mexico.)
Esteban E. Torres (1930–2022)	Mexican	Democratic	California	Jan 3, 1983	Jan 3, 1999	Retired
Barbara Vucanovich (Note: Although Ileana Ros-Lehtinen is widely credited as the first Hispanic woman in Congress, Vucanovich's mother was of partial Mexican Hispanic heritage.) (1921–2013)	Mexican	Republican	Nevada	Jan 3, 1983	Jan 3, 1997	Retired
Albert Bustamante (1935–2021)	Mexican	Democratic	Texas	Jan 3, 1985	Jan 3, 1993	Lost reelection (Note: Bustamante later was jailed for bribery.)
Ileana Ros-Lehtinen (born 1952)	Cuban	Republican	Florida	Aug 29, 1989	Jan 3, 2019	Retired
José E. Serrano (born 1943)	Puerto Rican	Democratic	New York	Mar 20, 1990	Jan 3, 2021	Retired
Ed Pastor (1943–2018)	Mexican	Democratic	Arizona	Oct 3, 1991	Jan 3, 2015	Retired
Xavier Becerra (born 1958)	Mexican	Democratic	California	Jan 3, 1993	Jan 24, 2017	Resigned to become Attorney General of California (Note: Becerra later served as United States Secretary of Health and Human Services.)
Henry Bonilla (born 1954)	Mexican	Republican	Texas	Jan 3, 1993	Jan 3, 2007	Lost reelection
Lincoln Díaz-Balart (1954–2025)	Cuban	Republican	Florida	Jan 3, 1993	Jan 3, 2011	Retired
Luis Gutiérrez (born 1953)	Puerto Rican	Democratic	Illinois	Jan 3, 1993	Jan 3, 2019	Retired
Bob Menendez (born 1954)	Cuban	Democratic	New Jersey	Jan 3, 1993	Jan 16, 2006	Resigned to accept appointment as U.S. Senator from New Jersey
Lucille Roybal-Allard (born 1941)	Mexican	Democratic	California	Jan 3, 1993	Jan 3, 2023	Retired
Frank Tejeda (1945–1997)	Mexican	Democratic	Texas	Jan 3, 1993	Jan 30, 1997	Died in office
Nydia Velázquez (born 1953)	Puerto Rican	Democratic	New York	Jan 3, 1993	Jan 3, 2027	Retiring
Rubén Hinojosa (born 1940)	Mexican	Democratic	Texas	Jan 3, 1997	Jan 3, 2017	Retired
Silvestre Reyes (born 1944)	Mexican	Democratic	Texas	Jan 3, 1997	Jan 3, 2013	Lost renomination
Loretta Sánchez (born 1960)	Mexican	Democratic	California	Jan 3, 1997	Jan 3, 2017	Retired to run unsuccessfully for the U.S. Senate from California
John E. Sununu (born 1964)	Salvadoran	Republican	New Hampshire	Jan 3, 1997	Jan 3, 2003	Retired to run successfully for the U.S. Senate from New Hampshire
Ciro Rodríguez (born 1946)	Mexican	Democratic	Texas	Apr 12, 1997	Jan 3, 2005	Lost renomination
Ciro Rodríguez (born 1946)	Mexican	Democratic	Texas	Jan 3, 2007	Jan 3, 2011	Lost reelection
Charlie González (born 1945)	Mexican	Democratic	Texas	Jan 3, 1999	Jan 3, 2013	Retired
Grace Napolitano (born 1936)	Mexican	Democratic	California	Jan 3, 1999	Jan 3, 2025	Retired
Joe Baca (born 1947)	Mexican	Democratic	California	Nov 16, 1999	Jan 3, 2013	Lost reelection
Hilda Solis (born 1957)	Mexican, Nicaraguan	Democratic	California	Jan 3, 2001	Feb 24, 2009	Resigned to become United States Secretary of Labor
Mario Díaz-Balart (born 1961)	Cuban	Republican	Florida	Jan 3, 2003	Incumbent	
Raúl Grijalva (1948–2025)	Mexican	Democratic	Arizona	Jan 3, 2003	Mar 13, 2025	Died in office
Linda Sánchez (born 1969)	Mexican	Democratic	California	Jan 3, 2003	Incumbent	
Henry Cuellar (born 1955)	Mexican	Democratic	Texas	Jan 3, 2005	Incumbent	
John Salazar (born 1953)	Mexican	Democratic	Colorado	Jan 3, 2005	Jan 3, 2011	Lost reelection
Albio Sires (born 1951)	Cuban	Democratic	New Jersey	Nov 13, 2006	Jan 3, 2023	Retired
Ben Ray Luján (born 1972)	Mexican	Democratic	New Mexico	Jan 3, 2009	Jan 3, 2021	Retired to run successfully for the U.S. Senate from New Mexico
John Garamendi (born 1945)	Spanish (Note: Congressman Garamendi's paternal grandparents were Basque immigrants from Spain, and the House Press Gallery recognizes Garamendi as Hispanic. That being said, many Basques do not consider themselves to be ethnically Spanish, and Garamendi has stated that he does not consider himself to be "Hispanic.")	Democratic	California	Nov 5, 2009	Incumbent	
Quico Canseco (born 1949)	Mexican	Republican	Texas	Jan 3, 2011	Jan 3, 2013	Lost reelection
Bill Flores (born 1954)	Spanish	Republican	Texas	Jan 3, 2011	Jan 3, 2021	Retired
Jaime Herrera Beutler (born 1978)	Mexican	Republican	Washington	Jan 3, 2011	Jan 3, 2023	Lost renomination
Raúl Labrador (born 1967)	Puerto Rican	Republican	Idaho	Jan 3, 2011	Jan 3, 2019	Retired to run unsuccessfully for the Republican nomination for Governor of Idaho
David Rivera (born 1965)	Cuban	Republican	Florida	Jan 3, 2011	Jan 3, 2013	Lost reelection
Tony Cárdenas (born 1963)	Mexican	Democratic	California	Jan 3, 2013	Jan 3, 2025	Retired
Joaquin Castro (born 1974)	Mexican	Democratic	Texas	Jan 3, 2013	Incumbent	
Pete Gallego (born 1961)	Mexican	Democratic	Texas	Jan 3, 2013	Jan 3, 2015	Lost reelection
Joe Garcia (born 1963)	Cuban	Democratic	Florida	Jan 3, 2013	Jan 3, 2015	Lost reelection
Michelle Lujan Grisham (born 1959)	Mexican	Democratic	New Mexico	Jan 3, 2013	Dec 31, 2018	Resigned to become Governor of New Mexico
Gloria Negrete McLeod (born 1941)	Mexican	Democratic	California	Jan 3, 2013	Jan 3, 2015	Retired to run unsuccessfully for the Board of Supervisors of San Bernardino County, California
Scott Perry (born 1962)	Colombian	Republican	Pennsylvania	Jan 3, 2013	Jan 3, 2027	Lost reelection
Raul Ruiz (born 1972)	Mexican	Democratic	California	Jan 3, 2013	Incumbent	
Juan Vargas (born 1961)	Mexican	Democratic	California	Jan 3, 2013	Incumbent	
Filemón Vela (born 1963)	Mexican	Democratic	Texas	Jan 3, 2013	Mar 31, 2022	Resigned
Pete Aguilar (born 1979)	Mexican	Democratic	California	Jan 3, 2015	Incumbent	
Carlos Curbelo (born 1980)	Cuban	Republican	Florida	Jan 3, 2015	Jan 3, 2019	Lost reelection
Ruben Gallego (born 1979)	Colombian, Mexican	Democratic	Arizona	Jan 3, 2015	Jan 3, 2025	Retired to run successfully for the U.S. Senate from Arizona
Alex Mooney (born 1971)	Cuban	Republican	West Virginia	Jan 3, 2015	Jan 3, 2025	Retired to run unsuccessfully for the Republican nomination for U.S. Senate from West Virginia
Norma Torres (born 1965)	Guatemalan	Democratic	California	Jan 3, 2015	Incumbent	
Nanette Barragán (born 1976)	Mexican	Democratic	California	Jan 3, 2017	Incumbent	
Salud Carbajal (born 1964)	Mexican	Democratic	California	Jan 3, 2017	Incumbent	
Lou Correa (born 1958)	Mexican	Democratic	California	Jan 3, 2017	Incumbent	
Adriano Espaillat (born 1954)	Dominican	Democratic	New York	Jan 3, 2017	Jan 3, 2027	Lost renomination
Vicente Gonzalez (born 1967)	Mexican	Democratic	Texas	Jan 3, 2017	Incumbent	
Rubén Kihuen (born 1980)	Mexican	Democratic	Nevada	Jan 3, 2017	Jan 3, 2019	Retired
Brian Mast (born 1980)	Mexican	Republican	Florida	Jan 3, 2017	Incumbent	
Darren Soto (born 1978)	Puerto Rican	Democratic	Florida	Jan 3, 2017	Incumbent	
Jimmy Gomez (born 1974)	Mexican	Democratic	California	Jul 11, 2017	Incumbent	
Gil Cisneros (born 1971)	Mexican	Democratic	California	Jan 3, 2019	Jan 3, 2021	Lost reelection
Gil Cisneros (born 1971)	Mexican	Democratic	California	Jan 3, 2025	Incumbent	
Antonio Delgado (born 1977)	Colombian, Mexican, Venezuelan	Democratic	New York	Jan 3, 2019	May 25, 2022	Resigned to become Lieutenant Governor of New York
Veronica Escobar (born 1969)	Mexican	Democratic	Texas	Jan 3, 2019	Incumbent	
Chuy García (born 1956)	Mexican	Democratic	Illinois	Jan 3, 2019	Jan 3, 2027	Retiring
Sylvia Garcia (born 1950)	Mexican	Democratic	Texas	Jan 3, 2019	Incumbent	
Anthony Gonzalez (born 1984)	Cuban	Republican	Ohio	Jan 3, 2019	Jan 3, 2023	Retired
Mike Levin (born 1978)	Mexican	Democratic	California	Jan 3, 2019	Incumbent	
Debbie Mucarsel-Powell (born 1971)	Ecuadorian	Democratic	Florida	Jan 3, 2019	Jan 3, 2021	Lost reelection
Alexandria Ocasio-Cortez (born 1989)	Puerto Rican	Democratic	New York	Jan 3, 2019	Incumbent	
Xochitl Torres Small (born 1984)	Mexican	Democratic	New Mexico	Jan 3, 2019	Jan 3, 2021	Lost reelection
Mike Garcia (born 1976)	Mexican	Republican	California	May 19, 2020	Jan 3, 2025	Lost reelection
Byron Donalds (born 1978)	Panamanian	Republican	Florida	Jan 3, 2021	Jan 3, 2027	Retiring to become Governor of Florida
Carlos Giménez (born 1954)	Cuban	Republican	Florida	Jan 3, 2021	Incumbent	
Tony Gonzales (born 1980)	Mexican	Republican	Texas	Jan 3, 2021	Apr 14, 2026	Resigned
Teresa Leger Fernandez (born 1959)	Mexican	Democratic	New Mexico	Jan 3, 2021	Incumbent	
Nicole Malliotakis (born 1980)	Cuban	Republican	New York	Jan 3, 2021	Incumbent	
María Elvira Salazar (born 1961)	Cuban	Republican	Florida	Jan 3, 2021	Incumbent	
Ritchie Torres (born 1988)	Puerto Rican	Democratic	New York	Jan 3, 2021	Incumbent	
Mayra Flores (born 1986)	Mexican	Republican	Texas	Jun 21, 2022	Jan 3, 2023	Lost reelection
Yadira Caraveo (born 1980)	Mexican	Democratic	Colorado	Jan 3, 2023	Jan 3, 2025	Lost reelection
Greg Casar (born 1989)	Mexican	Democratic	Texas	Jan 3, 2023	Incumbent	
Lori Chavez-DeRemer (born 1968)	Mexican	Republican	Oregon	Jan 3, 2023	Jan 3, 2025	Lost reelection (Note: Chavez-DeRemer later served as United States Secretary of Labor.)
Juan Ciscomani (born 1982)	Mexican	Republican	Arizona	Jan 3, 2023	Jan 3, 2027	Lost reelection
Mónica De La Cruz (born 1975)	Mexican	Republican	Texas	Jan 3, 2023	Incumbent	
Anthony D'Esposito (born 1982)	Puerto Rican	Republican	New York	Jan 3, 2023	Jan 3, 2025	Lost reelection
Maxwell Frost (born 1997)	Cuban (Note: Frost was adopted at birth, and raised from birth, by a Cuban-American family. Reliable sources invariably describe Frost, and he describes himself, as Cuban. See, e.g., Lai, Stephanie (December 6, 2022). "Maxwell Frost, First Gen Z Congressman, Gets His Bearings on Capitol Hill". The New York Times. ("Representative-elect Maxwell Frost, a 25-year-old Afro-Cuban progressive activist from Orlando ...."); "Maxwell Frost: el primer congresista de Estados Unidos de la generación Z y negro de origen cubano". CNN en Español. November 9, 2022. ("También es el primer negro de origen cubano elegido para el Congreso."); Ruiz, Michelle (November 11, 2022). "Maxwell Alejandro Frost, Gen Z's First Congressman, Is Living His Abuela's 'Wildest Dream'". Vogue. ("On Tuesday night, 25-year-old Maxwell Alejandro Frost made history as the first member of Gen Z—and the first Afro-Cuban—elected to the U.S. House of Representatives."); and "Meet Maxwell". Frost for Congress. ("My family’s story begins in Cuba, with my grandmother Yeya. She and my mother came to Florida from Cuba during the Freedom Flights in the early 1960s with only a suitcase and no money."). Frost's biological parents invariably have been described by reliable sources as a Haitian man and a woman of Lebanese ancestry whose origin sometimes is given as Puerto Rican and other times as Argentine. See, e.g., Bernal, Rafael. "Who is Maxwell Alejandro Frost, the 25-year-old Democratic House nominee?". The Hill. ("His birth parents were a Lebanese Puerto Rican woman and a Haitian man."); and Dorsey, Xander (July 18, 2023). "Empowering Generation Z to Take Action". Scholastic Kids Press. ("Frost was born to a mother of Lebanese and Argentine descent and a Haitian father."))	Democratic	Florida	Jan 3, 2023	Incumbent	
Robert Garcia (born 1977)	Peruvian	Democratic	California	Jan 3, 2023	Incumbent	
Marie Gluesenkamp Perez (born 1988)	Mexican	Democratic	Washington	Jan 3, 2023	Incumbent	
Anna Paulina Luna (born 1989)	Mexican	Republican	Florida	Jan 3, 2023	Incumbent	
Rob Menendez (born 1985)	Cuban	Democratic	New Jersey	Jan 3, 2023	Incumbent	
Delia Ramirez (born 1983)	Guatemalan	Democratic	Illinois	Jan 3, 2023	Incumbent	
Andrea Salinas (born 1969)	Mexican	Democratic	Oregon	Jan 3, 2023	Incumbent	
George Santos (born 1988)	Brazilian	Republican	New York	Jan 3, 2023	Dec 1, 2023	Expelled by the House of Representatives (Note: Santos later pleaded guilty to identity theft and wire fraud.)
Gabe Vasquez (born 1984)	Mexican	Democratic	New Mexico	Jan 3, 2023	Incumbent	
Greg Lopez (born 1964)	Mexican	Republican	Colorado	Jul 8, 2024	Jan 3, 2025	Retired
Gabe Evans (born 1986)	Mexican	Republican	Colorado	Jan 3, 2025	Jan 3, 2027	Lost reelection
Sam Liccardo (born 1970)	Mexican	Democratic	California	Jan 3, 2025	Incumbent	
Nellie Pou (born 1956)	Puerto Rican	Democratic	New Jersey	Jan 3, 2025	Incumbent	
Emily Randall (born 1985)	Mexican	Democratic	Washington	Jan 3, 2025	Incumbent	
Luz Rivas (born 1976)	Mexican	Democratic	California	Jan 3, 2025	Incumbent	
Adelita Grijalva (born 1970)	Mexican	Democratic	Arizona	Nov 12, 2025	Incumbent	
Analilia Mejía (born 1977)	Colombian, Dominican	Democratic	New Jersey	Apr 20, 2026	Incumbent	

=== Representatives-elect ===
Name (lifespan)	Ancestry	Party	State	Start	Notes
Michael Alfonso (born 1999/2000)	Cuban	Republican	Wisconsin	January 3, 2027	Elect
Darializa Avila Chevalier (born 1993/1994)	Dominican	Democratic	New York	January 3, 2027	Elect
Teresa Benitez-Thompson (born 1978)	Mexican	Democratic	Nevada	January 3, 2027	Elect
Johnny Garcia (born 1987/1988)	Mexican	Democratic	Texas	January 3, 2027	Elect
Patty García (born 1984/1985)	Mexican	Democratic	Illinois	January 3, 2027	Elect
Angela Gonzales-Torres (born 1994)	Mexican	Democratic	California	January 3, 2027	Elect
Leticia Gutierrez (born 1972/1973)	Mexican	Democratic	Texas	January 3, 2027	Elect
JoAnna Mendoza (born 1965)	Mexican	Democratic	Arizona	January 3, 2027	Elect
Richard Ojeda (born 1970)	Mexican	Democratic	North Carolina	January 3, 2027	Elect
Katy Padilla Stout (born 1985/1986)	Mexican	Democratic	Texas	January 3, 2027	Elect
Denise Powell (born 1978)	Cuban	Democratic	Nebraska	January 3, 2027	Elect
Bobby Pulido (born 1973)	Mexican	Democratic	Texas	January 3, 2027	Elect
Manny Rutinel (born 1994)	Dominican	Democratic	Colorado	January 3, 2027	Elect
Hilda Solis (born 1957)	Mexican, Nicaraguan	Democratic	California	January 3, 2027	Elect
Claire Valdez (born 1989)	Mexican	Democratic	New York	January 3, 2027	Elect
Randy Villegas (born 1994)	Mexican	Democratic	California	January 3, 2027	Elect

=== Elected to the House of Representatives, but not seated ===
Name (lifespan)	Ancestry	Party	State	Year elected	Notes
David Levy Yulee (1810–1886)	Spanish	Democratic	Florida	1845	"Did not take his seat in the House" when elected to the U.S. Senate

=== House delegates (non-voting members) ===
(Note: Delegates are organized first in chronological order according to their first term in office, then second in alphabetical order according to their surname.)

Name (Note: Delegates from Puerto Rico (since 1901) and from the Philippines (from 1907 to 1946) officially are known as Resident Commissioners.) (lifespan)	Ancestry	Party	Territory	Start	End	Notes
Joseph Marion Hernández (1788–1857)	Spanish	Democratic-Republican	Florida	Sep 30, 1822	Mar 4, 1823	Retired
David Levy Yulee (1810–1886)	Spanish	Democratic	Florida	Mar 4, 1841	Mar 3, 1845	Office eliminated when Territory of Florida was admitted to the Union as the State of Florida (Note: Yulee later was elected as United States Senator from Florida.)
José Manuel Gallegos (1815–1875)	Mexican	Democratic	New Mexico	Mar 4, 1853	Jul 23, 1856	Lost election contestation
José Manuel Gallegos (1815–1875)	Mexican	Democratic	New Mexico	Mar 4, 1871	Mar 4, 1873	Lost reelection
Miguel Antonio Otero (1829–1882)	Mexican	Democratic	New Mexico	Jul 23, 1856	Mar 4, 1861	Retired
Francisco Perea (1830–1913)	Mexican	Republican	New Mexico	Mar 4, 1863	Mar 4, 1865	Lost reelection
José Francisco Chaves (1833–1904)	Mexican	Republican	New Mexico	Mar 4, 1865	Mar 4, 1867	Lost reelection
José Francisco Chaves (1833–1904)	Mexican	Republican	New Mexico	Feb 20, 1869	Mar 4, 1871	Lost reelection
Trinidad Romero (1835–1918)	Mexican	Republican	New Mexico	Mar 4, 1877	Mar 4, 1879	Retired
Mariano S. Otero (1844–1904)	Mexican	Republican	New Mexico	Mar 4, 1879	Mar 4, 1881	Retired
Tranquilino Luna (1849–1892)	Mexican	Republican	New Mexico	Mar 4, 1881	Mar 5, 1884	Lost election contestation
Francisco Antonio Manzanares (1843–1904)	Mexican	Democratic	New Mexico	Mar 5, 1884	Mar 4, 1885	Retired
Pedro Perea (1852–1906)	Mexican	Republican	New Mexico	Mar 4, 1899	Mar 4, 1901	Retired
Federico Degetau (1862–1914)	Puerto Rican	Republican	Puerto Rico	Mar 4, 1901	Mar 4, 1905	Retired
Tulio Larrínaga (1847–1917)	Puerto Rican	Unionist	Puerto Rico	Mar 4, 1905	Mar 4, 1911	Lost reelection
Benito Legarda (1853–1915)	Spanish	Federalist (Republican)	Philippine Islands	Nov 22, 1907	Mar 4, 1912	Retired
Manuel L. Quezón (1878–1944)	Spanish	Nacionalista	Philippine Islands	Nov 23, 1909	Oct 15, 1916	Retired (Note: Quezón later served as President of the Commonwealth of the Philippines.)
Luis Muñoz Rivera (1859–1916)	Puerto Rican	Unionist	Puerto Rico	Mar 4, 1911	Nov 15, 1916	Died in office
Félix Córdova Dávila (1878–1938)	Puerto Rican	Unionist	Puerto Rico	Aug 7, 1917	Apr 11, 1932	Resigned to accept appointment as Associate Justice of the Supreme Court of Puerto Rico
Isauro Gabaldón (1875–1942)	Spanish	Nacionalista	Philippine Islands	Mar 4, 1920	Jul 16, 1928	Resigned
José Lorenzo Pesquera (1882–1950)	Puerto Rican	Independent	Puerto Rico	Apr 15, 1932	Mar 4, 1933	Retired
Santiago Iglesias (1872–1939)	Spanish	Coalitionist	Puerto Rico	Mar 4, 1933	Dec 5, 1939	Died in office
Joaquín Miguel Elizalde (1896–1965)	Spanish	Nonpartisan	Philippines	Sep 29, 1938	Aug 9, 1944	Resigned
Bolívar Pagán (1897–1961)	Puerto Rican	Coalitionist	Puerto Rico	Dec 26, 1939	Jan 3, 1945	Lost reelection
Jesús T. Piñero (1897–1952)	Puerto Rican	Popular; Democratic	Puerto Rico	Jan 3, 1945	Sep 2, 1946	Resigned to accept appointment as Governor of Puerto Rico
Antonio Fernós-Isern (1895–1974)	Puerto Rican	Popular; Democratic	Puerto Rico	Sep 11, 1946	Jan 3, 1965	Retired to run successfully for the Puerto Rico Senate
Santiago Polanco-Abreu (1920–1988)	Puerto Rican	Popular; Democratic	Puerto Rico	Jan 3, 1965	Jan 3, 1969	Lost reelection
Jorge Luis Córdova (1907–1994)	Puerto Rican	New Progressive	Puerto Rico	Jan 3, 1969	Jan 3, 1973	Lost reelection
Jaime Benítez (1908–2001)	Puerto Rican	Popular; Democratic	Puerto Rico	Jan 3, 1973	Jan 3, 1977	Lost reelection
Ron de Lugo (1930–2020)	Puerto Rican	Democratic	Virgin Islands	Jan 3, 1973	Jan 3, 1979	Retired to run unsuccessfully for Governor of the Virgin Islands
Ron de Lugo (1930–2020)	Puerto Rican	Democratic	Virgin Islands	Jan 3, 1981	Jan 3, 1995	Retired
Baltasar Corrada del Río (1935–2018)	Puerto Rican	New Progressive	Puerto Rico	Jan 3, 1977	Jan 3, 1985	Retired to run successfully for Mayor of San Juan, Puerto Rico
Jaime Fuster (1941–2007)	Puerto Rican	Popular; Democratic	Puerto Rico	Jan 3, 1985	Mar 4, 1992	Resigned to accept appointment as Associate Justice of the Supreme Court of Puerto Rico
Antonio Colorado (born 1939)	Puerto Rican	Popular; Democratic	Puerto Rico	Mar 4, 1992	Jan 3, 1993	Lost reelection
Carlos Romero Barceló (Note: Romero-Barceló previously served as Governor of Puerto Rico.) (1932–2021)	Puerto Rican	New Progressive	Puerto Rico	Jan 3, 1993	Jan 3, 2001	Lost reelection
Aníbal Acevedo Vilá (born 1962)	Puerto Rican	Popular; Democratic	Puerto Rico	Jan 3, 2001	Jan 2, 2005	Resigned to become Governor of Puerto Rico
Luis G. Fortuño (born 1960)	Puerto Rican	New Progressive	Puerto Rico	Jan 3, 2005	Jan 2, 2009	Resigned to become Governor of Puerto Rico
Pedro Pierluisi (born 1959)	Puerto Rican	New Progressive	Puerto Rico	Jan 3, 2009	Jan 3, 2017	Retired to run unsuccessfully for the nomination for Governor of Puerto Rico (Note: Pierluisi later served as Governor of Puerto Rico.)
Jenniffer González (born 1976)	Puerto Rican	New Progressive	Puerto Rico	Jan 3, 2017	Jan 2, 2025	Resigned to become Governor of Puerto Rico
Pablo Hernández Rivera (born 1991)	Puerto Rican	Popular Democratic	Puerto Rico	Jan 3, 2025	Incumbent	

== See also ==
- Congressional Hispanic Caucus
- Congressional Hispanic Conference
