= New Mexico Territory's at-large congressional district =

US congressional district (1851–1912)

Coordinates: 34°N 106°W

- Obsolete district
- Created: 1851, as a non-voting delegate was granted by Congress
- Eliminated: 1912, as a result of statehood
- Years active: 1851–1912

New Mexico Territory with its final borders in 1866

New Mexico Territory's at-large congressional district is an obsolete congressional district representing the New Mexico Territory, which was created in 1850. After New Mexico's admission to the Union as the 47th state by act of Congress on January 6, 1912, this district was dissolved and replaced by New Mexico's at-large congressional district.

== Pre-territorial delegate ==
The general boundaries of the territory were established following the Treaty of Guadalupe Hidalgo in 1848, but Congress did not formally organize the territory right away. Despite the uncertain status of the region, political leaders met in September 1849, and elected Hugh N. Smith as its Congressional delegate. Smith presented his credentials to Congress on February 4, 1850, but the House refused to seat him, ruling that no territorial government existed and no authority to elect a delegate had been granted.

== List of delegates representing the district ==
On September 9, 1850, following the passage of the Compromise of 1850, New Mexico Territory was officially created by an act of Congress and was given the authority to elect a delegate, the first of which was Richard H. Weightman.

Delegate (District home)	Party	Years	Cong ress	Electoral history
District established March 4, 1851
Richard H. Weightman (Santa Fe)	Democratic	March 4, 1851 – March 3, 1853	32nd	Elected in October 1851. Retired.
José Manuel Gallegos (Albuquerque)	Democratic	March 4, 1853 – July 23, 1856	33rd 34th	Elected in 1853. Re-elected in 1855. Lost election contest.
Miguel A. Otero (Albuquerque)	Democratic	July 23, 1856 – March 3, 1861	34th 35th 36th	Won election contest. Re-elected in 1857. Re-elected in 1859. Retired.
John S. Watts (Santa Fe)	Republican	March 4, 1861 – March 3, 1863	37th	Elected in 1860. Retired.
Francisco Perea (Bernalillo)	Republican	March 4, 1863 – March 3, 1865	38th	Elected in 1862. Lost renomination.
J. Francisco Chaves (Santa Fe)	Republican	March 4, 1865 – March 3, 1867	39th	Elected in 1864; Lost re-election.
Vacant		March 4, 1867 – September 2, 1867	40th	
Charles P. Clever (Santa Fe)	Democratic	September 2, 1867 – February 20, 1869	40th	Elected in 1886; Re-elected in 1868; Lost election contest.
J. Francisco Chaves (Santa Fe)	Republican	February 20, 1869 – March 3, 1871	40th 41st	Elected in 1868. Won election contest to finish the current term. Lost re-election.
José Manuel Gallegos (Santa Fe)	Democratic	March 4, 1871 – March 3, 1873	42nd	Elected in 1870. Lost re-election.
Stephen B. Elkins (Santa Fe)	Republican	March 4, 1873 – March 3, 1877	43rd 44th	Elected in 1872. Re-elected in 1874. Retired.
Trinidad Romero (Las Vegas)	Republican	March 4, 1877 – March 3, 1879	45th	Elected in 1876. [data missing]
Mariano S. Otero (Peralta)	Republican	March 4, 1879 – March 3, 1881	46th	Elected in 1878. Retired.
Tranquilino Luna (Los Lunas)	Republican	March 4, 1881 – March 5, 1884	47th 48th	Elected in 1880. Re-elected in 1882. Lost election contest.
Francisco A. Manzanares (Las Vegas)	Democratic	March 5, 1884 – March 3, 1885	48th	Won election contest. Retired.
Antonio Joseph (Ojo Caliente)	Democratic	March 4, 1885 – March 3, 1895	49th 50th 51st 52nd 53rd	Elected in 1884. Re-elected in 1886. Re-elected in 1888. Re-elected in 1890. Re-elected in 1892. Lost re-election to Catron.
Thomas B. Catron (Santa Fe)	Republican	March 4, 1895 – March 3, 1897	54th	Elected in 1894. Lost re-election.
H. B. Fergusson (Albuquerque)	Democratic	March 4, 1897 – March 3, 1899	55th	Elected in 1896. Lost re-election.
Pedro Perea (Bernalillo)	Republican	March 4, 1899 – March 3, 1901	56th	Elected in 1898. Retired.
Bernard S. Rodey (Albuquerque)	Republican	March 4, 1901 – March 3, 1905	57th 58th	Elected in 1900. Re-elected in 1902. Lost renomination.
William H. Andrews (Albuquerque)	Republican	March 4, 1905 – January 7, 1912	59th 60th 61st 62nd	Elected in 1904. Re-elected in 1906. Re-elected in 1908. Re-elected in 1910. Position eliminated.
District dissolved January 7, 1912
