= Tranquilino Luna =

American politician

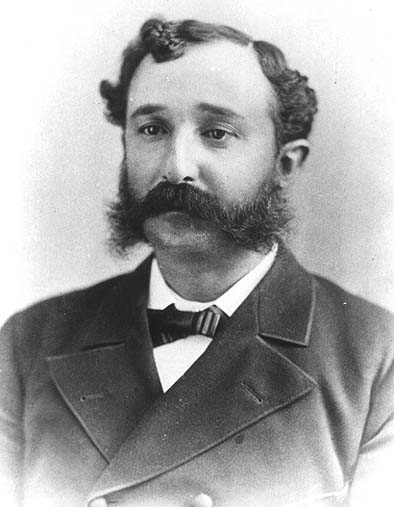

Member of the U.S. House of Representatives from New Mexico Territory's At-large district
- In office March 4, 1881 – March 5, 1884 (Delegate)
- Preceded by: Mariano S. Otero
- Succeeded by: Francisco A. Manzanares

Personal details
- Born: February 25, 1849 Los Lunas, New Mexico Territory
- Died: November 20, 1892 (aged 43) Peralta, New Mexico Territory
- Party: Republican
- Education: University of Missouri

Tranquilino Luna (February 25, 1849 – November 20, 1892) was a Delegate to the United States House of Representatives from the Territory of New Mexico. Born in Los Lunas, New Mexico, Luna attended the public schools and graduated from the University of Missouri in Columbia, Missouri. He engaged extensively in stock raising.

Luna served as delegate to the Republican National Conventions in 1880 and 1888. Luna was elected as a Republican to the Forty-seventh Congress (March 4, 1881 – March 3, 1883). He presented credentials as a Delegate-elect to the Forty-eighth Congress and served from March 4, 1883, until March 5, 1884, when he was succeeded by Francisco A. Manzanares, who contested his election. After leaving Congress, he was the Sheriff of Valencia County, New Mexico, from 1888 to 1892. He died in Peralta, New Mexico, on November 20, 1892, and was buried in Los Lunas Cemetery in Los Lunas, New Mexico.

== See also ==
- List of Hispanic Americans in the United States Congress

== Sources ==
- United States Congress. "Tranquilino Luna (id: L000513)". Biographical Directory of the United States Congress.

U.S. House of Representatives
Preceded by Mariano S. Otero	Delegate to the U.S. House of Representatives from New Mexico; March 4, 1881 - March 5, 1884	Succeeded by Francisco A. Manzanares
