= Antonio Joseph (politician) =

American politician

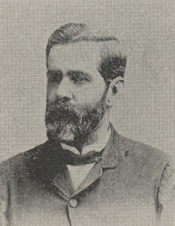

Member of the U.S. House of Representatives from New Mexico Territory's At-large district
- In office March 4, 1885 – March 3, 1895 (Delegate)
- Preceded by: Francisco A. Manzanares
- Succeeded by: Thomas B. Catron

Personal details
- Born: August 25, 1846 St. Louis, Missouri, U.S.
- Died: April 19, 1910 (aged 63) Ojo Caliente, New Mexico Territory, U.S.
- Party: Democratic
- Education: Webster College; Bryant and Stratton's Commercial College

Antonio Joseph (August 25, 1846 – April 19, 1910) was an American politician who served as a Delegate from the Territory of New Mexico.

Born in St. Louis, Missouri, Joseph attended Lux's Academy in Taos, Bishop Lamy's School in Santa Fe, New Mexico, Webster College in St. Louis County, Missouri, and Bryant and Stratton's Commercial College in St. Louis, Missouri. He then engaged in mercantile pursuits. He was county judge of Taos County, New Mexico from 1878 to 1880. He then moved to Ojo Caliente, New Mexico, in 1880, and served as member of the Territorial house of representatives in 1882.

Joseph was elected as a Democrat to the Forty-ninth and to the four succeeding Congresses (March 4, 1885 – March 3, 1895). He was an unsuccessful candidate for reelection in 1894 to the Fifty-fourth Congress. He served in the Territorial senate 1896–1898, serving as president of that body in 1898.

He again engaged in the mercantile business and was an owner of hotels and owned extensive real estate holdings. He died in Ojo Caliente, New Mexico, April 19, 1910, and was interred in Fairview Cemetery, Santa Fe, New Mexico.

U.S. House of Representatives
Preceded by Francisco A. Manzanares	Delegate to the U.S. House of Representatives from New Mexico; 1885-1895	Succeeded by Thomas B. Catron
