= Trinidad Romero =

American politician

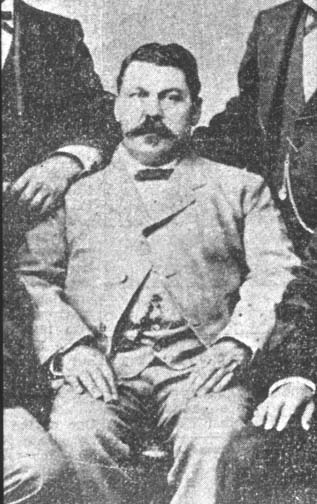

U.S. Marshal
- In office November 13, 1889 – May 30, 1893

Member of the U.S. House of Representatives from New Mexico Territory's At-large district
- In office March 4, 1877 – March 3, 1879 (Delegate)
- Preceded by: Stephen B. Elkins
- Succeeded by: Mariano S. Otero

Personal details
- Born: June 15, 1835 Santa Fe, First Mexican Republic (now New Mexico, U.S.)
- Died: August 28, 1918 (aged 83) Las Vegas, New Mexico
- Party: Republican
- Occupation: businessman, rancher

Trinidad Romero (June 15, 1835 – August 28, 1918) was an American politician and rancher who was the Delegate to United States Congress from the Territory of New Mexico.

Trinidad Romero was born in Santa Fe, Santa Fe County (then a part of the Republic of Mexico), New Mexico, Romero was educated by private tutors. He engaged in merchandising, freighting with ox teams from Kansas City to Santa Fe, and later in stock raising. He served as member of the Territorial house of representatives in 1863. Probate judge of San Miguel County, New Mexico, in 1869 and 1870.

Romero was elected as a Republican to the Forty-fifth Congress (March 4, 1877 – March 3, 1879). He was not a candidate for renomination in 1878. He was appointed United States marshal by President Harrison and served from November 13, 1889, to May 30, 1893. He engaged in mercantile pursuits and stock raising on his ranch near Wagon Mound, New Mexico. He died in Las Vegas, San Miguel County, New Mexico, August 28, 1918. He was interred in Calvary Cemetery.

== See also ==
- List of Hispanic Americans in the United States Congress

== Sources ==
- United States Congress. "Trinidad Romero (id: R000416)". Biographical Directory of the United States Congress.

U.S. House of Representatives
Preceded by Stephen B. Elkins	Delegate to the U.S. House of Representatives from New Mexico; 1877-1879	Succeeded by Mariano S. Otero
