= Hispanic and Latino Americans in the United States Congress =

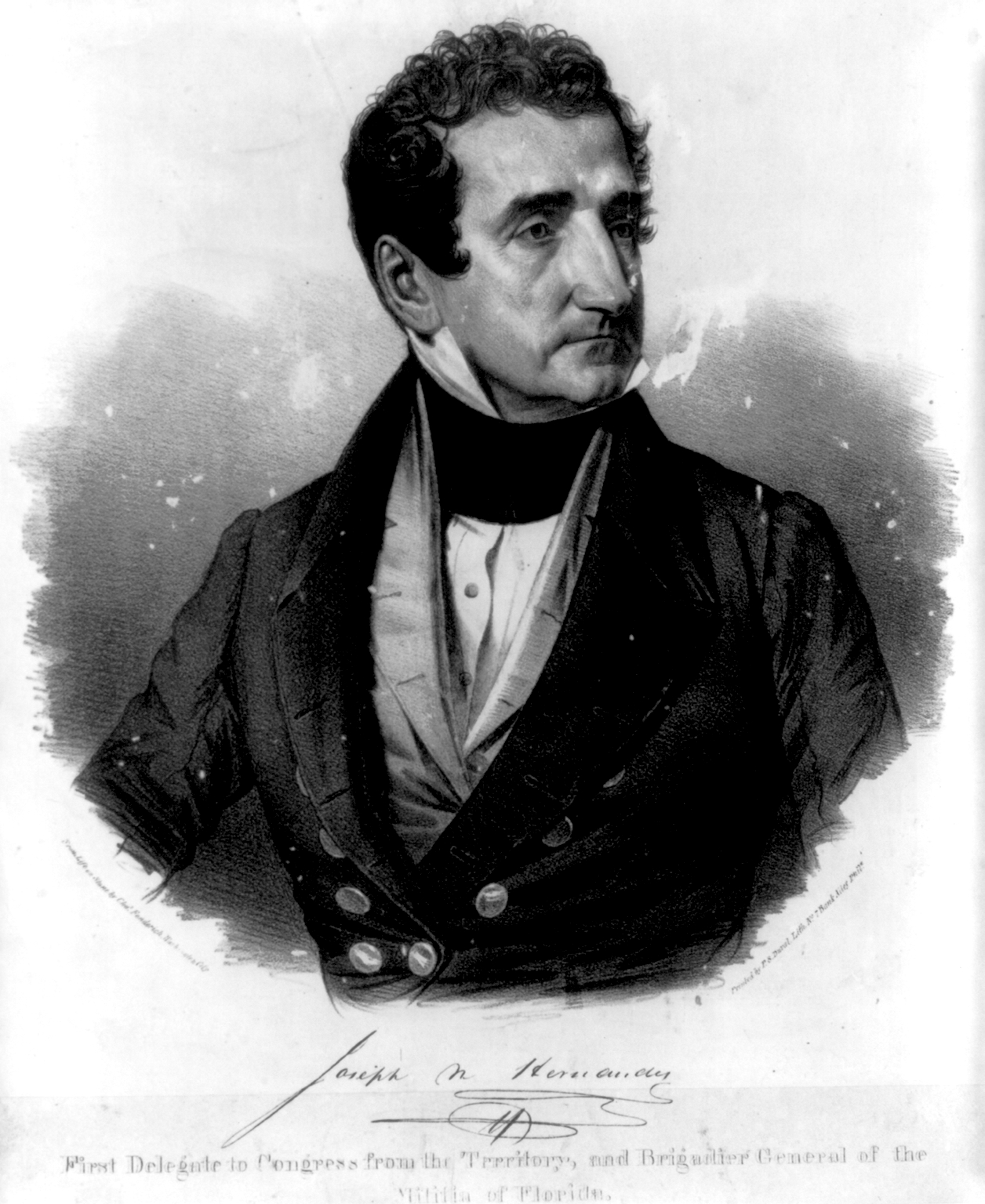
Delegate Joseph Marion Hernández of the Florida Territory, elected in 1822, the first Hispanic or Latino American to serve in the United States Congress in any capacity.

Hispanic and Latino Americans have served in the United States Congress since the early 19th century. The first group elected to serve in the Congress were incorporated as part of the United States territorial expansion into previous Spanish territories of the North American mainland as part of American campaigns of manifest destiny. The earliest Hispanic and Latino Representation in Congress came in the form of territorial delegates from newly acquired territories, such as Florida, New Mexico, and more, serving as representatives for territories that later on join the United States with full statehood. The history of Latino and Hispanic Americans in Congress is intertwined with the history of United States expansion on the North American mainland, with expansion into previous Spanish and Mexican lands leading to expansions in Hispanic and Latino influence in Congress.

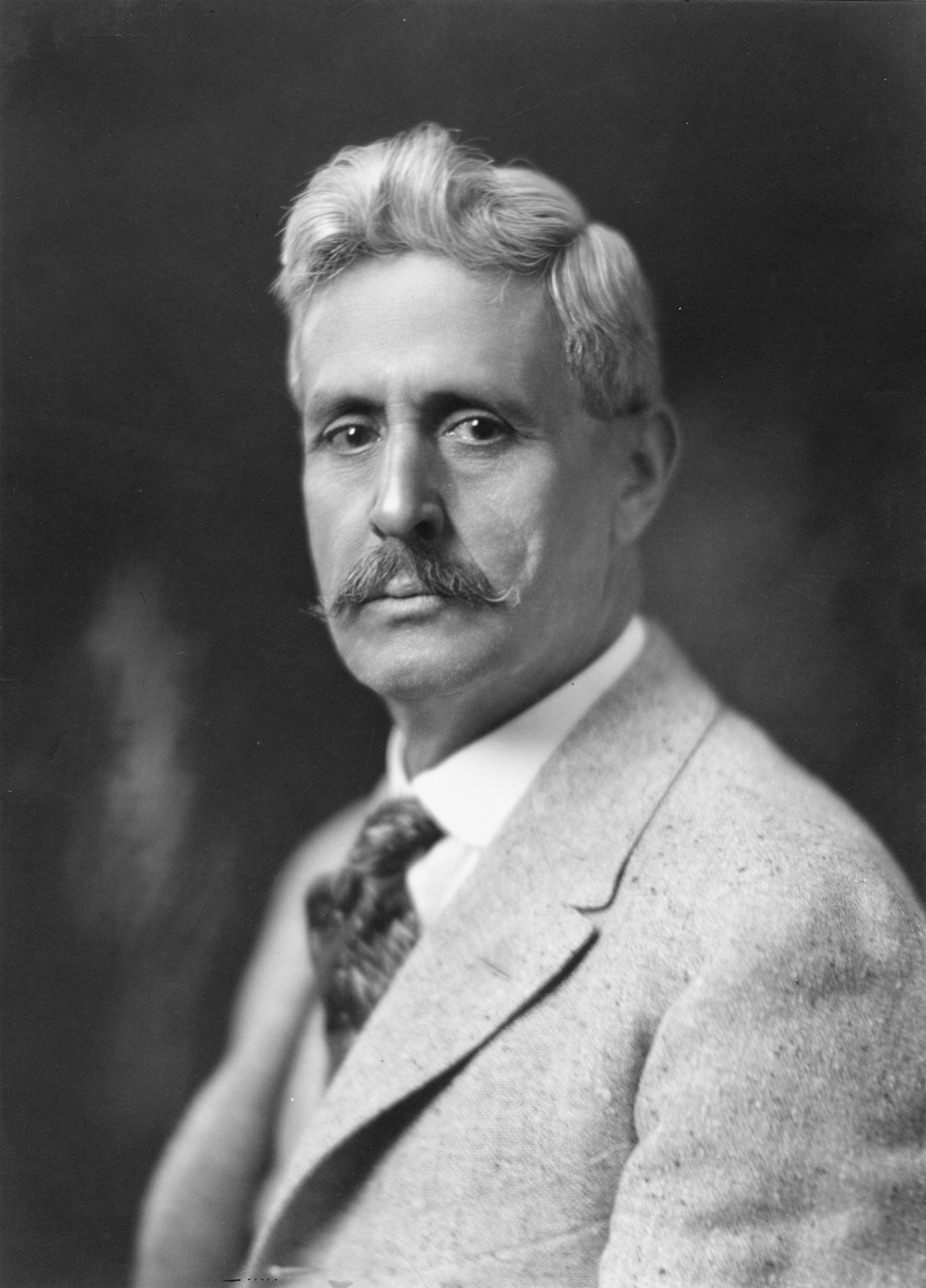
Republican politician Octaviano Ambrosio Larrazolo, the first Mexican-American and first Latino United States senator elected in 1928.

The early periods of Hispanic and Latino representation in Congress struggled from inabilities to gain legislative traction as positions as territorial delegates were often met with skepticism from other members of Congress as they were categorized as outsiders. Important legislative steps forward in the 20th century coupled with expanding Hispanic and Latino influence grew the legislative and political presence of Hispanic and Latino Americans in Congress.

Parallels and dissimilarities have been drawn between the experiences of Latino and Hispanic Americans in Congress and those of African Americans in the United States Congress. Among the notable similarities are that the history of both of these groups in Congress have been largely served in the House of Representatives, with Hispanic and Latino Americans not elected to the Senate until Octaviano Ambrosio Larrazolo was elected in 1928, as both Dominique Bouligny and Judah P. Benjamin of Louisiana were appointed. Additionally, like African American representatives in Congress, Hispanic and Latino Americans have taken on the role of surrogates for their ethnic communities, expanding their representation beyond the scope of districts and states to try to begin to provide substantive representation to Hispanic and Latino Americans. One major difference faced by Hispanic and Latino Congress members was the saliency and discussion surrounding race, as many of the early representatives faced lower levels of criticism and scrutiny than early African American politicians.

A total of 164 Hispanic or Latino Americans have served in the United States Congress, a majority of which have served in the United States House of Representatives. Of the 150 total, 36 have served as non-voting members of the House of Representatives as either Territorial Delegates or Resident Commissioners of Puerto Rico.

150 Hispanic and Latino Americans have served as U.S. representatives in the United States House of Representatives, meaning that 150 of the total 164 Hispanic and Latino Americans to serve in Congress, or 95%, have served in the House of Representatives at one point; 5 members of the House of Representatives have gone on to serve in the Senate, the most recent of which is Senator Ben Ray Luján of New Mexico who served in both houses of Congress.

A total of 14 Hispanic and Latino Americans have served in the United States Senate, with 6 serving from the Republican party and 8 from the Democratic Party. A total of 5 Hispanic or Latino Americans served in the United States Senate before the 21st century, three serving as senators for the state of New Mexico and 2 from the state of Louisiana. The 9 senators remaining served during the 21st century: 5 Democrats, from California, Colorado, New Jersey, New Mexico and Nevada respectively; and 4 Republicans, 2 from Florida, 1 from New Hampshire and 1 from Texas.

== History of representation ==
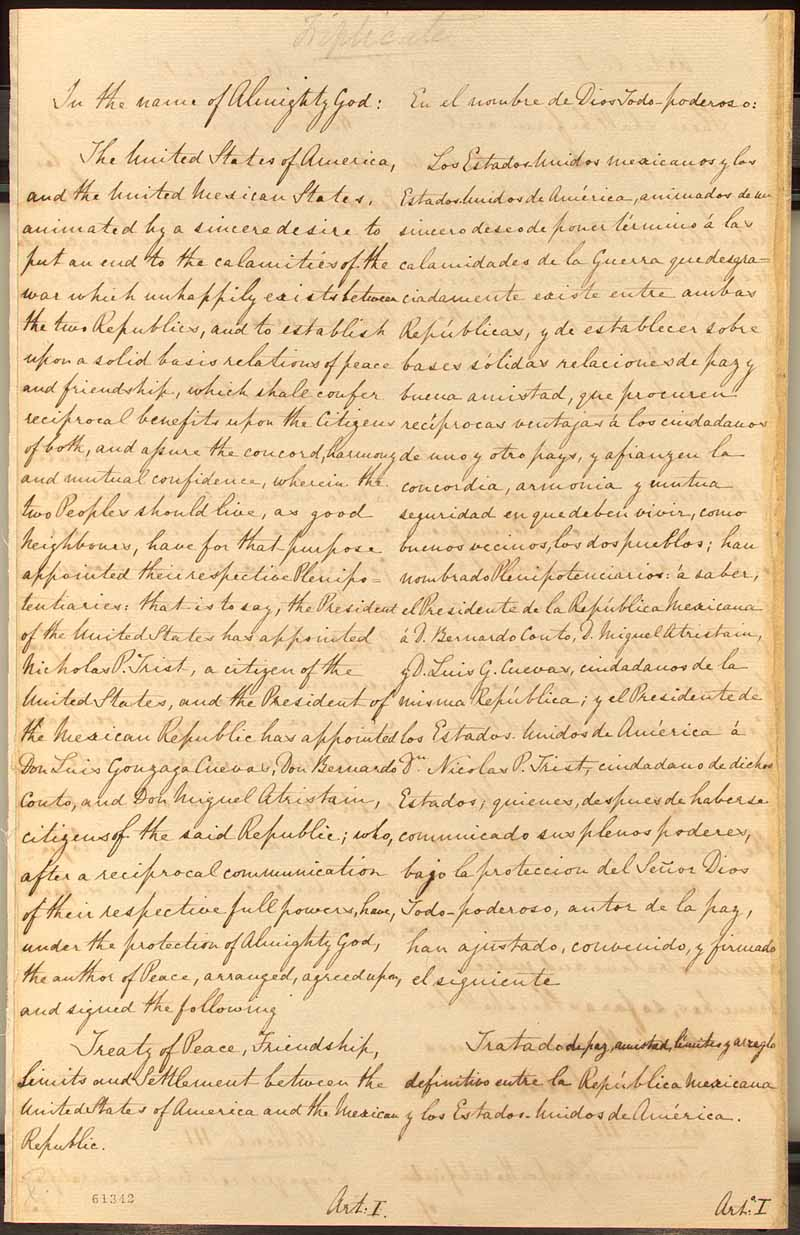
February 2, 1848, signed Treaty of Guadalupe Hidalgo, which ended the Mexican-American War and gave large segments of Mexican land to the United States.

=== Manifest Destiny and 19th century expansion ===
The earliest iterations of Hispanic and Latino Americans in Congress were fueled by the territorial expansion undertaken by the United States throughout the 19th century, expansion fueled by the American ideals of Manifest destiny. Important territorial expansions of the 19th century included the Louisiana Purchase, the Adams–Onís Treaty, the Annexation of Texas, the Treaty of Guadalupe Hidalgo, and armistice that ended the Spanish-American War in 1898. All of these gains combined to give the United States all or portions of the states of Florida, Louisiana, Texas, New Mexico, Arizona, California, Nevada, Utah, Colorado, and Wyoming; all of these land gains were previously held by Spain or Mexico, and in particular the Treaty of Guadalupe Hidalgo played a key role.

Joseph Marion Hernández was the first ever Hispanic or Latino American to serve in the United States Congress, serving as the delegate from the Territory of Florida to the House of Representatives from 1822 to 1823. The early Hispanic and Latino representatives often faced racism and were seen as outsiders and foreigners who were invading Congress, especially those who served as territorial delegates, fueled by the territory gained by the United States in the period. The earliest history of representation largely placed delegates as political observers, wrestling with the issues of diminished powers for territorial representation, the language and cultural barriers, and a lack of voting privileges coupled with no real coalition building or political alliances. The language barrier was so notable for some representatives, such as for New Mexico territorial delegate José Manuel Gallegos, who had an interpreter read his speeches throughout his tenure in Congress.

For over 100 years after the Treaty of Guadalupe Hidalgo was signed, which ended the Mexican-American War and gave the United States the large portions of the Southwestern borderlands, until the period following World War II, the only Hispanic and Latino Americans involved in national politics were from three states: California, Louisiana, and New Mexico.

=== Post Spanish-American War period ===
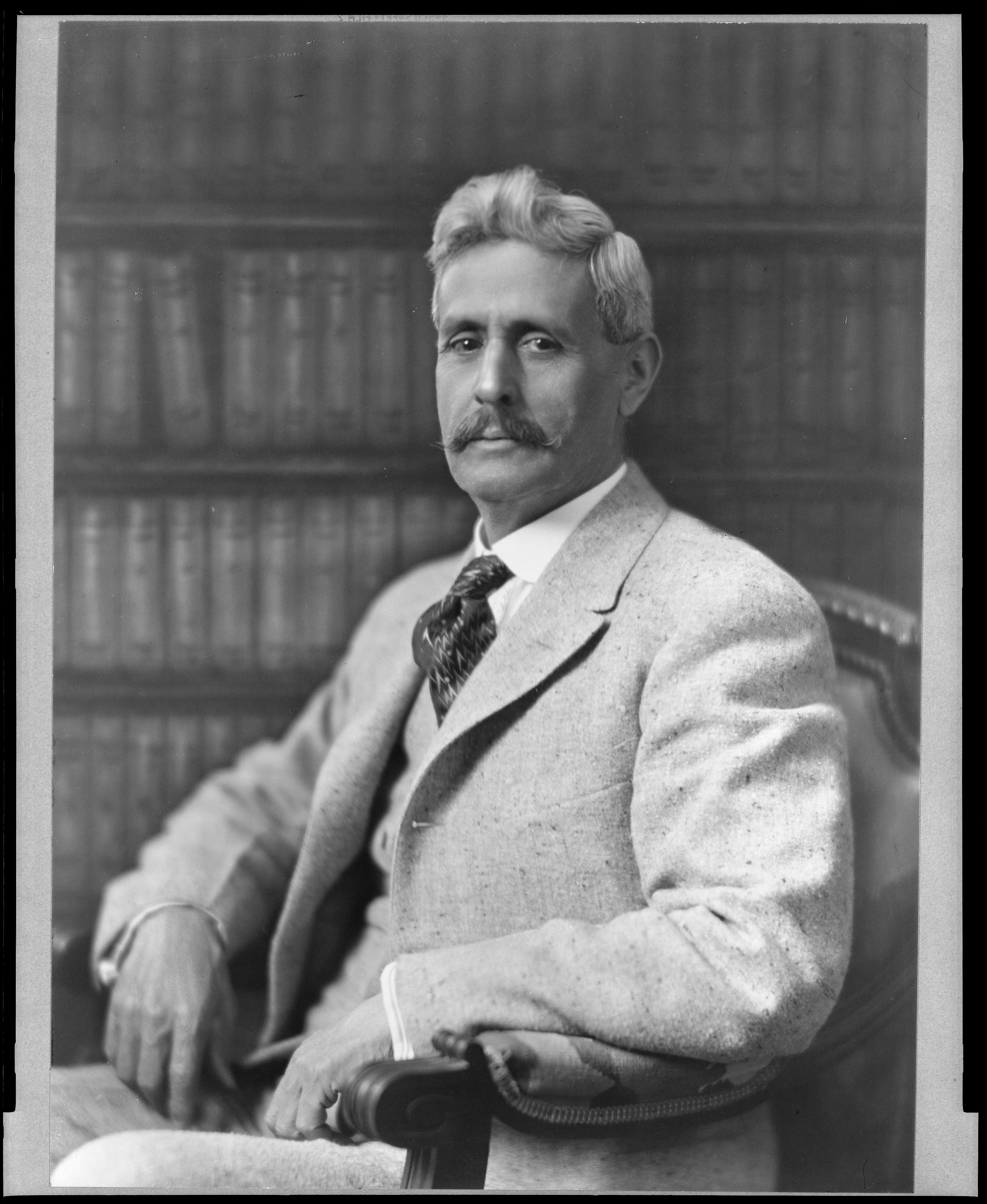
Sen. Octaviano Larrazolo, a Republican from New Mexico, the first Hispanic or Latino American to serve in the United States Senate, was elected in 1928.

One of the major questions that arose in the aftermath of the Spanish-American War in 1898 was the question of territorial status on the mainland and abroad. The gains of the Spanish-American War included claims to Guam, the Philippines, and Puerto Rico, and the handling of Puerto Rico in particular proved key to deciding how these foreign territories were to be treated, particularly with the establishment of the Foraker Act of 1900 and the Jones Act of 1917. One of the ways that Hispanic and Latino representation in Congress increased was that it created the position of Resident Commissioner for Puerto Rico, although this position contained some of the same restrictions previously experienced by territorial delegates.

The period also saw some substantive gains as it saw the first two Latino senators ever elected, led by the election of Octaviano Ambrosio Larrazola in 1928. Dennis Chávez of New Mexico followed suit by being elected in 1935 and becoming the first Hispanic or Latino American to serve in both the United States House of Representatives and the United States Senate; Chávez also importantly represented a continued trend of political representation leading to substantive and surrogate representation of Hispanic and Latino American interests more widely, and was one of the earliest advocates for Hispanic and Latino American civil rights. This period represented important gains that would be built upon in the period following World War II and beyond.

== The modern era ==
=== Post World War II representation ===
The aftermath World War II proved another time for increased representation for Hispanic and Latino Americans in Congress, fueled by desires for equal rights born out of experiences fighting for the country abroad. Increased political representation in Congress was coupled with local activism and civil rights organizations was the path forward for Hispanic and Latino Americans seeking change, leading to the formation of more far-reaching activism of the Chicano Movement. Hispanic and Latino American politicians continued to make gains in important positions in Congress, and for the first time in this period had an equal number of full voting members in Congress and non-voting delegates.

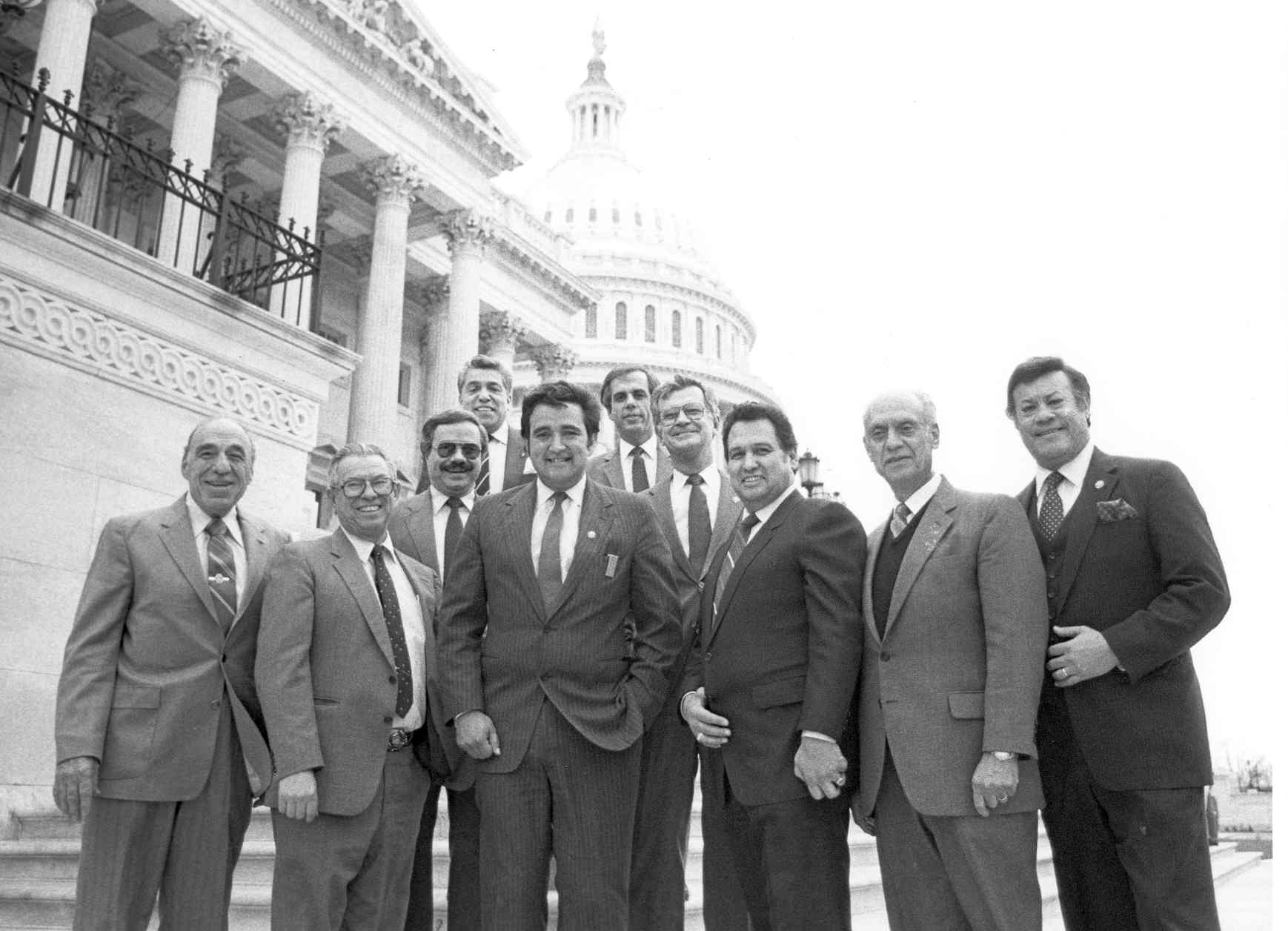
The Congressional Hispanic Caucus was founded in 1976. Pictured are members of the Caucus gathered together in 1984.

The period following World War II continued to be marked by strides in representation, encapsulated by the formation of the Congressional Hispanic Caucus in 1976; the formation of the Caucus represented the coming together of a Hispanic and Latino movement and a larger identity united behind common goals of civil rights, political representation, and to encourage participation amongst Hispanic and Latino Americans. This period also represented a time of rapid increase in descriptive representation within Congress, with increases from 7 Hispanic or Latino Americans in the 95th United States Congress in 1977 to the 47 of the 116th Congress of 2019; more than 60% of the Hispanic and Latino American representatives in Congress were seated after 1977.

=== 21st century ===
Major gains in Hispanic and Latino American representation have been made in both houses of Congress during the 21st century. Six new senators were elected in the new century, prior to the 21st century, only 3 Hispanic or Latino Americans had ever served in the United States Senate.

Currently, there are 47 members of the 116th United States Congress who are Latino or Hispanic Americans. 40 of these members are representatives in the United States House of Representatives, 4 of them are members of the United States Senate, and the final 3 members are territorial delegates. The 116th Congress contains a record number of 4 senators: Bob Menendez, a Democrat from New Jersey; Marco Rubio, a Republican from Florida; Ted Cruz, a Republican from Texas; and Catherine Cortez Masto, a Democrat from Nevada. The 116th Congress also contains a record 40 Latino representatives in the U.S. House of Representatives.

== See also ==
- Congressional Hispanic Caucus
- Hispanic and Latino American politics in the United States
