= Francisco Antonio Manzanares =

American politician

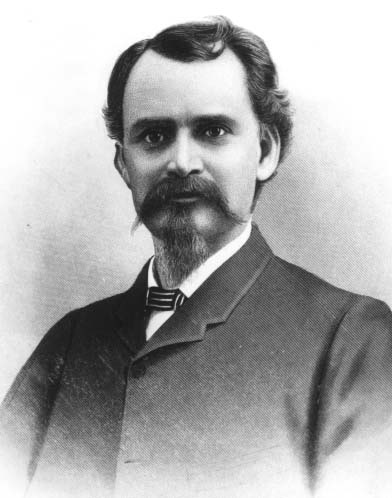

Member of the U.S. House of Representatives from New Mexico Territory's At-large district
- In office March 5, 1884 – March 3, 1885 (Delegate)
- Preceded by: Tranquilino Luna
- Succeeded by: Antonio Joseph

Personal details
- Born: Francisco Antonio Manzanares Valdez; January 25, 1843 Abiquiú, Santa Fé de Nuevo México, Mexican Republic (now Rio Arriba County, New Mexico, U.S.)
- Died: September 17, 1904 (aged 61) Las Vegas, New Mexico Territory
- Party: Democratic
- Occupation: businessman and politician

Francisco Antonio Manzanares Valdez (January 25, 1843 – September 17, 1904) was an American businessman and politician.

== Family background and childhood ==
Francisco Antonio Manzanares, son of Jose Antonio Manzanares and Maria Manuela Valdez, was born in Abiquiú, New Mexico, on January 25, 1843. Barely three years later in 1846, the Mexican–American War commenced. By the time he was seven, New Mexico had become a territory of the United States.

The Manzanares family held a very prominent place in the community. His parents were from Spanish families that moved to the New Mexico territory during the colonial period. Manzanares's father had supported the Union during the civil war, and afterward, served in the legislative assembly as an Indian Agent.

Manzanares grew up with Spanish as his first language, and during his youth attended Taos School under the instruction of Father Antonio Jose Martinez. In 1863 he began attending St. Louis University, where he studied English until 1864.

== Career in business ==
Manzanares then began his business career with Chick, Browne, and Co. in Kansas City, the birthplace of the firm. He held a sales position there for a brief period, and then quickly relocated to New York City, where he continued his college education. While in New York, Manzanares began working at a bank. He learned valuable skills during his year in New York which resulted in a career leap upon his return to Kansas City. where he was named partner of Chick, Browne, and Co. Throughout his years working for the firm, Manzanares opened a number of markets throughout Kansas Pacific, Atchison, Topeka and Santa Fe Railway train routes. In 1879, the firm was renamed to Browne and Manzanares, with Manzanares now a full partner. The firm was then moved to Las Vegas, New Mexico.

Though New Mexico was still in a period of transition, Manzanares wasted no time in working to boost the economy. With the help of other members in the community, Manzanares planned and founded Las Vegas Waterworks Association. He did not stop there, however, and soon aided in the development of financial infrastructure of the state by opening First National Banks in Las Vegas, Santa Fe, and Raton.

== A political transition ==
In 1882, Manzanares left the banking business and challenged Republican candidate Tranquilino Luna for a seat in Congress. Luna was declared the winner and initially was seated by the House, but Manzanares later won an election contestation and was seated. Manzanares served as a territorial delegate to the United States House of Representatives from March 5, 1884, to March 3, 1885. He did not run for re-election.

Manzanares was also a member of the board of county commissioners in San Miguel County in 1896 and 1897. He died on September 17, 1904, in Las Vegas, New Mexico.

== See also ==
- List of Hispanic Americans in the United States Congress

== Sources ==
- United States Congress. "Francisco Antonio Manzanares (id: M000118)". Biographical Directory of the United States Congress.

U.S. House of Representatives
Preceded by Tranquilino Luna	Delegate to the U.S. House of Representatives from New Mexico; March 5, 1884 – March 3, 1885	Succeeded by Antonio Joseph
