= Mary F. Hoyt =

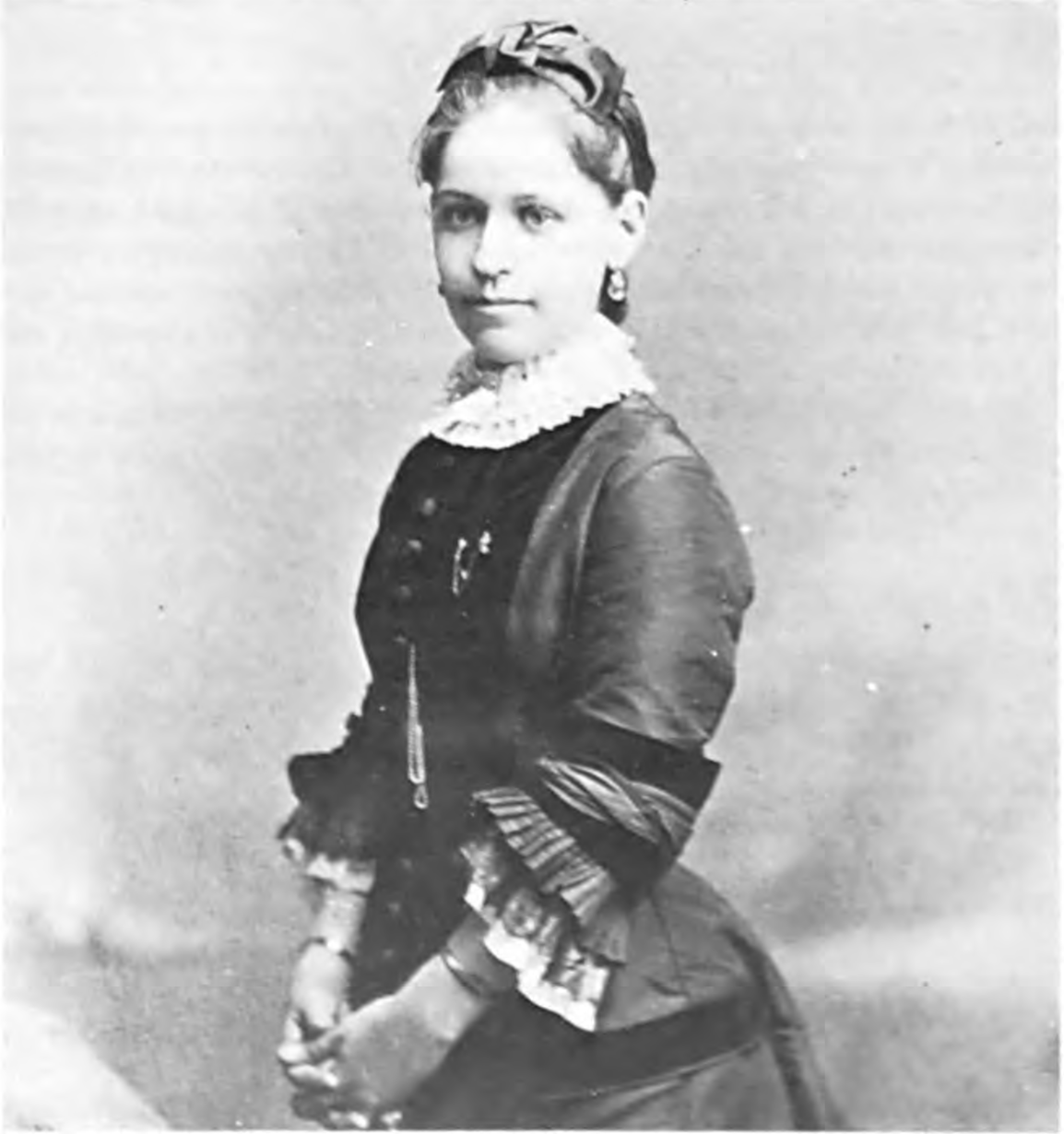
Hoyt, shortly before joining the civil service

Mary Frances Hoyt (17 June 1858 – 10 October 1958) was the first woman to be appointed to the United States federal civil service, and the second person hired through the merit-based examination system established in 1883.

Born in Southport, Connecticut, Hoyt graduated from Vassar College in 1880 before joining the Census Office, in Washington, D.C. On 12 July 1883 she sat for the newly-established civil service examination, where she earned the highest score of any applicant. Although she passed the examination on August 25, the Civil Service Commission withheld her name from the first available position, as the job required heavy lifting so was considered unsuitable for a woman. On 5 September 1883 she was hired by the Treasury Department to clerk in the Bank Redemption Agency for a salary of $900 (equivalent to $31,000 in 2025).

In 1888 she resigned her position to marry a co-worker from the Census Office, Brice J. Moses (1862–1928). They had two sons. She became the focus of attention again in 1958 as the civil service celebrated the 75th anniversary of the examination, and she celebrated her 100th birthday. In a letter commemorating the anniversary and recognizing her achievement, President Dwight D. Eisenhower dubbed her "First Lady of the Civil Service".

Hoyt died in 1958 in New York City, a few months after the celebrations. She had lost her sight nine years earlier. For many years before her death she had been the oldest living Vassar graduate.
