= Peralta, New Mexico =

- Town
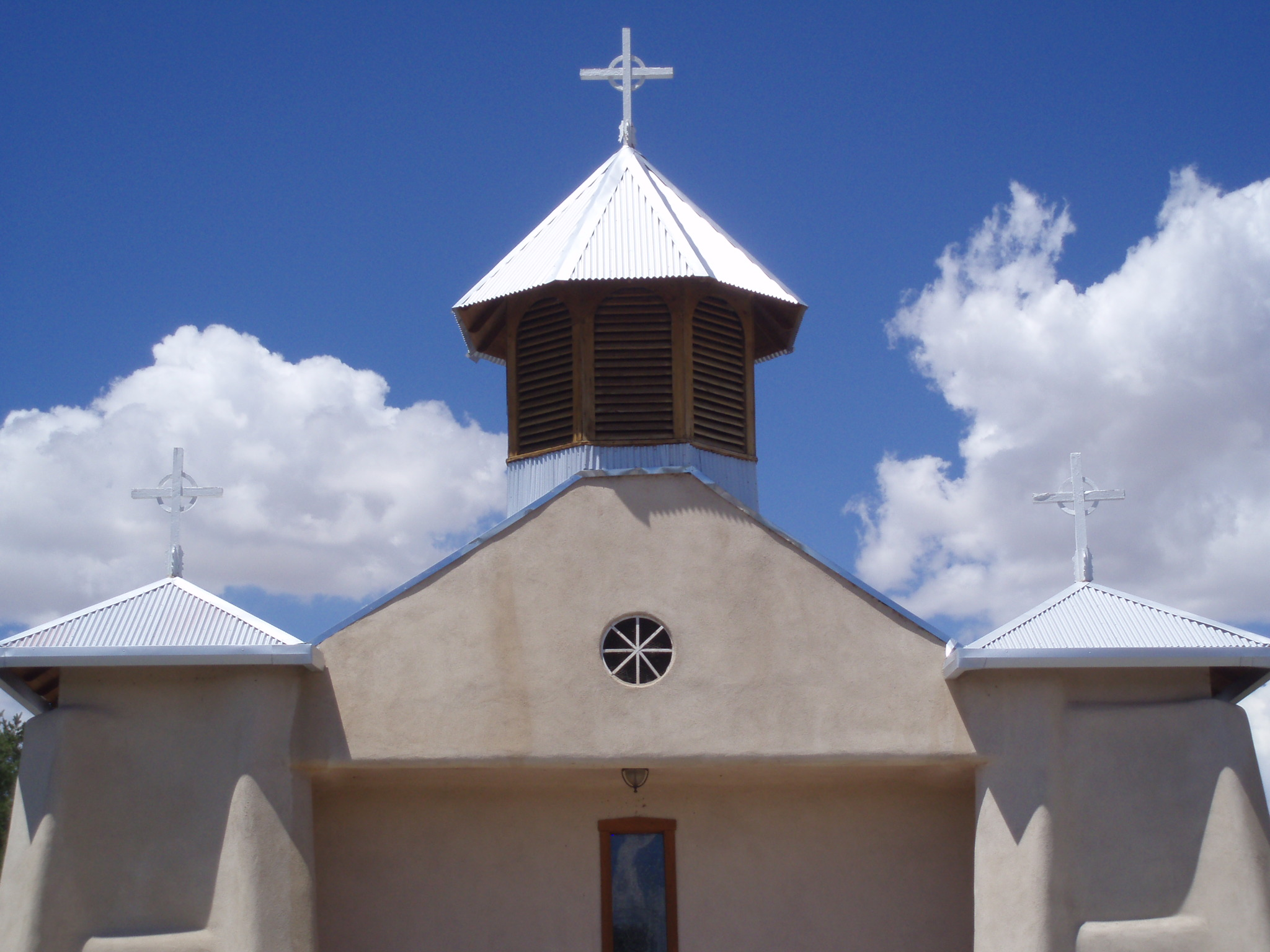
- Our Lady of Guadalupe, Peralta

- Location of Peralta, New Mexico

- Location in the United States
- Coordinates: 34°49′42″N 106°41′09″W
- Country: United States
- State: New Mexico
- County: Valencia

Area
  - Total: 4.44 sq mi (11.51 km^{2})
  - Land: 4.44 sq mi (11.51 km^{2})
  - Water: 0 sq mi (0.00 km^{2})
- Elevation: 4,859 ft (1,481 m)

Population (2020)
  - Total: 3,342
  - Density: 752.2/sq mi (290.41/km^{2})
- Time zone: UTC-7 (Mountain (MST))
  - Summer (DST): UTC-6 (MDT)
- ZIP codes: 87042, 87068
- Area code: 505
- FIPS code: 35-56180
- GNIS feature ID: 2424937
- Website: townofperalta.org

Peralta is a town in Valencia County, New Mexico, United States. Prior to its incorporation on July 1, 2007, it was a census-designated place (CDP). As of the 2020 census, Peralta had a population of 3,342. Peralta is part of the Albuquerque metropolitan area.

== Geography ==
According to the United States Census Bureau, the CDP had a total area of 4.4 square miles (11 km^{2}), all land.

== History ==
Peralta was the site of the Battle of Peralta, a minor engagement near the end of Confederate General Henry Hopkins Sibley's 1862 New Mexico Campaign during the Civil War.

"The Padre of Isleta", Anton Docher served as a priest in Peralta during his long period in Isleta.

== Demographics ==
Historical population
Census	Pop.	Note	%±
2010	3,660		—
2020	3,342		−8.7%
U.S. Decennial Census

=== 2020 census ===
As of the 2020 census, Peralta had a population of 3,342. The median age was 47.1 years. 19.7% of residents were under the age of 18 and 20.1% of residents were 65 years of age or older. For every 100 females, there were 103.9 males, and for every 100 females age 18 and over, there were 99.4 males age 18 and over.

93.0% of residents lived in urban areas, while 7.0% lived in rural areas.

There were 1,278 households in Peralta, of which 29.2% had children under the age of 18 living in them. Of all households, 52.0% were married-couple households, 18.5% were households with a male householder and no spouse or partner present, and 21.9% were households with a female householder and no spouse or partner present. About 22.6% of all households were made up of individuals, and 10.0% had someone living alone who was 65 years of age or older.

There were 1,353 housing units, of which 5.5% were vacant. The homeowner vacancy rate was 1.3% and the rental vacancy rate was 6.5%.

Racial composition as of the 2020 census
Race	Number	Percent
White	1,872	56.0%
Black or African American	24	0.7%
American Indian and Alaska Native	99	3.0%
Asian	22	0.7%
Native Hawaiian and Other Pacific Islander	1	0.0%
Some other race	510	15.3%
Two or more races	814	24.4%
Hispanic or Latino (of any race)	1,829	54.7%

=== 2000 census ===
As of the 2000 census, there were 3,750 people, 1,314 households, and 1,034 families residing in the CDP. The population density was 851.4 inhabitants per square mile (328.7/km^{2}). There were 1,413 housing units at an average density of 320.8 per square mile (123.9/km^{2}). The racial makeup of the CDP was 66.88% White, 0.75% African American, 2.27% Native American, 0.32% Asian, 24.24% from other races, and 5.55% from two or more races. Hispanic or Latino of any race were 51.28% of the population.

There were 1,314 households, out of which 37.4% had children under the age of 18 living with them, 62.1% were married couples living together, 10.9% had a female householder with no husband present, and 21.3% were non-families. 16.3% of all households were made up of individuals, and 5.5% had someone living alone who was 65 years of age or older. The average household size was 2.85 and the average family size was 3.19.

In the CDP, the population was spread out, with 28.9% under the age of 18, 7.1% from 18 to 24, 28.9% from 25 to 44, 24.1% from 45 to 64, and 11.0% who were 65 years of age or older. The median age was 36 years. For every 100 females, there were 95.9 males. For every 100 females age 18 and over, there were 95.2 males.

The median income for a household in the CDP was $38,039, and the median income for a family was $39,605. Males had a median income of $31,916 versus $26,442 for females. The per capita income for the CDP was $15,511. About 10.6% of families and 11.5% of the population were below the poverty line, including 15.3% of those under age 18 and 13.6% of those age 65 or over.

== Education ==
It is in the Los Lunas Public Schools school district.

The community's single public school, Peralta Elementary, is operated by Los Lunas Schools.
