= 1994 United States gubernatorial elections =

- November 8, 1994

38 governorships 36 states; 2 territories
	Majority party	Minority party
Party	Republican	Democratic
Seats before	20 (Note: Alaskan Governor Wally Hickel was elected on the Alaskan Independence Party line in 1990 but switched to the Republican Party in April 1994.)	29
Seats after	30	19
Seat change	▲10	▼10
Popular vote	32,271,544	24,973,982
Percentage	53.69%	41.55%
Seats up	14	21
Seats won	24	11
	Third party	Fourth party
Party	Independent	A Connecticut Party
Seats before	0	1
Seats after	1	0
Seat change	▲1	▼1
Popular vote	1,155,416	216,585
Percentage	1.92%	0.36%
Seats up	0	1
Seats won	1	0
- Results of the elections: Democratic gain Republican gain Democratic hold Republican hold Independent gain No election

On November 8, 1994, gubernatorial elections were held in 36 states and two territories across the United States. Many seats held by Democratic governors switched to the Republicans during the time known as the Republican Revolution. Notably, this marked the first time since 1969 that Republicans secured the majority of governorships in an election cycle.

Before the elections, 21 seats were held by Democrats, 14 were held by Republicans, and one seat was held by an independent. After the elections, 11 seats would be held by Democrats, 24 by Republicans, and one seat by an independent.

These elections occurred concurrently with the midterm elections for the Senate and the House of Representatives. To date, it remains the last time that Democrats have won gubernatorial elections in Florida and Nebraska. Conversely, this election cycle began an ongoing pattern in which Rust Belt states Michigan, Pennsylvania, and Wisconsin would vote for gubernatorial candidates of the same party, with the sole exception of 2014. As of 2025, this is the last time one party posted a net gain of 10 or more seats.

== Election results ==
=== States ===
State	Incumbent	Party	First elected	Result	Candidates
Alabama	Jim Folsom Jr.	Democratic	1993 (Note: Folsom took office after his predecessor (H. Guy Hunt) was removed from office.)	Incumbent lost election to full term. New governor elected. Republican gain.	✓ Fob James (Republican) 50.3%; Jim Folsom Jr. (Democratic) 49.4%
Alaska	Wally Hickel	Republican	1966 (Note: Hickel was elected as a Republican in his first term in 1966. He was elected under the Alaskan Independence Party for his second term in 1990, before switching back to the Republican Party towards the end of his second term in April 1994.); 1969 (resigned); 1990	Incumbent retired. New governor elected. Democratic gain.	✓ Tony Knowles (Democratic) 41.1%; Jim Campbell (Republican) 40.8%; Jack Coghill (AK Independence) 13.0%; Jim Sykes (Green) 4.1%
Arizona	Fife Symington	Republican	1990	Incumbent re-elected.	✓ Fife Symington (Republican) 52.5%; Eddie Basha (Democratic) 44.3%; John A. Buttrick (Libertarian) 3.1%
Arkansas	Jim Guy Tucker	Democratic	1992 (Note: Tucker took office after his predecessor (Bill Clinton) resigned.)	Incumbent elected to full term.	✓ Jim Guy Tucker (Democratic) 59.8%; Sheffield Nelson (Republican) 40.2%
California	Pete Wilson	Republican	1990	Incumbent re-elected.	✓ Pete Wilson (Republican) 55.2%; Kathleen Brown (Democratic) 40.6%; Richard Rider (Libertarian) 1.7%; Jerome McCready (American Independent) 1.5%
Colorado	Roy Romer	Democratic	1986	Incumbent re-elected.	✓ Roy Romer (Democratic) 55.5%; Bruce D. Benson (Republican) 38.7%; Kevin Swanson (Constitution) 3.6%; Philip Hufford (Green) 1.5%
Connecticut	Lowell Weicker	A Connecticut Party	1990	Incumbent retired. New governor elected. Republican gain.	✓ John G. Rowland (Republican) 36.2%; Bill Curry (Democratic) 32.7%; Eunice Groark (A Connecticut Party) 18.9%; Tom Scott (Independent) 11.3%
Florida	Lawton Chiles	Democratic	1990	Incumbent re-elected.	✓ Lawton Chiles (Democratic) 50.8%; Jeb Bush (Republican) 49.2%
Georgia	Zell Miller	Democratic	1990	Incumbent re-elected.	✓ Zell Miller (Democratic) 51.0%; Guy Millner (Republican) 49.0%
Hawaii	John D. Waihe'e III	Democratic	1986	Incumbent term-limited. New governor elected. Democratic hold.	✓ Ben Cayetano (Democratic) 36.6%; Frank Fasi (Best) 30.7%; Pat Saiki (Republican) 29.2%; Kioni Dudley (Green) 3.5%
Idaho	Cecil D. Andrus	Democratic	1970; 1977 (resigned); 1986	Incumbent retired. New governor elected. Republican gain.	✓ Phil Batt (Republican) 52.3%; Larry Echo Hawk (Democratic) 43.9%; Ronald D. Rankin (Independent) 3.8%
Illinois	Jim Edgar	Republican	1990	Incumbent re-elected.	✓ Jim Edgar (Republican) 63.9%; Dawn Clark Netsch (Democratic) 34.4%
Iowa	Terry Branstad	Republican	1982	Incumbent re-elected.	✓ Terry Branstad (Republican) 56.8%; Bonnie Campbell (Democratic) 41.6%
Kansas	Joan Finney	Democratic	1990	Incumbent retired. New governor elected. Republican gain.	✓ Bill Graves (Republican) 64.1%; Jim Slattery (Democratic) 35.9%
Maine	John R. McKernan Jr.	Republican	1986	Incumbent term-limited. New governor elected. Independent gain.	✓ Angus King (Independent) 35.4%; Joseph E. Brennan (Democratic) 33.8%; Susan Collins (Republican) 23.1%; Jonathan Carter (Green) 6.4%; Ed Finks (Write-in) 1.3%
Maryland	William D. Schaefer	Democratic	1986	Incumbent term-limited. New governor elected. Democratic hold.	✓ Parris Glendening (Democratic) 50.2%; Ellen Sauerbrey (Republican) 49.8%
Massachusetts	Bill Weld	Republican	1990	Incumbent re-elected.	✓ Bill Weld (Republican) 70.9%; Mark Roosevelt (Democratic) 28.3%
Michigan	John Engler	Republican	1990	Incumbent re-elected.	✓ John Engler (Republican) 61.5%; Howard Wolpe (Democratic) 38.5%
Minnesota	Arne Carlson	Republican	1990	Incumbent re-elected.	✓ Arne Carlson (Republican) 63.3%; John Marty (Democratic) 34.1%; Will Shetterly (Grassroots) 1.2%
Nebraska	Ben Nelson	Democratic	1990	Incumbent re-elected.	✓ Ben Nelson (Democratic) 73.0%; Gene Spence (Republican) 25.6%
Nevada	Bob Miller	Democratic	1989 (Note: Miller took office after his predecessor (Richard Bryan) resigned. He was subsequently elected in the 1990 Nevada gubernatorial election.)	Incumbent re-elected.	✓ Bob Miller (Democratic) 52.7%; Jim Gibbons (Republican) 41.3%; Daniel Hansen (Independent American) 2.6%; Denis Sholty (Libertarian) 1.0%
New Hampshire	Steve Merrill	Republican	1992	Incumbent re-elected.	✓ Steve Merrill (Republican) 69.9%; Wayne King (Democratic) 25.6%; Steven Winter (Libertarian) 4.4%
New Mexico	Bruce King	Democratic	1970; 1974 (term-limited); 1978; 1982 (term-limited); 1990	Incumbent lost re-election. New governor elected. Republican gain.	✓ Gary Johnson (Republican) 49.8%; Bruce King (Democratic) 39.9%; Roberto Mondragón (Green) 10.3%
New York	Mario Cuomo	Democratic	1982	Incumbent lost re-election. New governor elected. Republican gain.	✓ George Pataki (Republican) 48.8%; Mario Cuomo (Democratic) 45.5%; Tom Golisano (Independence) 4.2%; Robert T. Walsh (Right to Life) 1.3%
Ohio	George Voinovich	Republican	1990	Incumbent re-elected.	✓ George Voinovich (Republican) 71.8%; Rob Burch (Democratic) 25.0%; Billy R. Inmon (Independent) 3.2%
Oklahoma	David Walters	Democratic	1990	Incumbent retired. New governor elected. Republican gain.	✓ Frank Keating (Republican) 46.9%; Jack Mildren (Democratic) 29.6%; Wes Watkins (Independent) 23.5%
Oregon	Barbara Roberts	Democratic	1990	Incumbent retired. New governor elected. Democratic hold.	✓ John Kitzhaber (Democratic) 51.0%; Denny Smith (Republican) 42.4%; Ed Hickam (American) 4.8%; Danford Ploeg (Libertarian) 1.6%
Pennsylvania	Bob Casey Sr.	Democratic	1986	Incumbent term-limited. New governor elected. Republican gain.	✓ Tom Ridge (Republican) 45.4%; Mark Singel (Democratic) 39.9%; Peg Luksik (Constitution) 12.8%
Rhode Island	Bruce Sundlun	Democratic	1990	Incumbent lost renomination. New governor elected. Republican gain.	✓ Lincoln Almond (Republican) 47.4%; Myrth York (Democratic) 43.5%; Robert J. Healey (Independent) 9.1%
South Carolina	Carroll A. Campbell Jr.	Republican	1986	Incumbent term-limited. New governor elected. Republican hold.	✓ David Beasley (Republican) 50.4%; Nick Theodore (Democratic) 47.9%
South Dakota	Walter Dale Miller	Republican	1993 (Note: Miller took office after his predecessor (George S. Mickelson) died.)	Incumbent lost nomination to full term. New governor elected. Republican hold.	✓ Bill Janklow (Republican) 55.4%; Jim Beddow (Democratic) 40.5%; Nathan A. Barton (Libertarian) 4.1%
Tennessee	Ned McWherter	Democratic	1986	Incumbent term-limited. New governor elected. Republican gain.	✓ Don Sundquist (Republican) 54.3%; Phil Bredesen (Democratic) 44.7%
Texas	Ann Richards	Democratic	1990	Incumbent lost re-election. New governor elected. Republican gain.	✓ George W. Bush (Republican) 53.5%; Ann Richards (Democratic) 45.9%
Vermont	Howard Dean	Democratic	1991 (Note: Dean took office after his predecessor (Richard Snelling) died. He was subsequently elected in the 1992 Vermont gubernatorial election.)	Incumbent re-elected.	✓ Howard Dean (Democratic) 68.7%; David F. Kelley (Republican) 19.0%; Thomas J. Morse (Independent) 7.1%; Dennis Lane (Grassroots) 1.0%
Wisconsin	Tommy Thompson	Republican	1986	Incumbent re-elected.	✓ Tommy Thompson (Republican) 67.2%; Charles Chvala (Democratic) 30.9%
Wyoming	Mike Sullivan	Democratic	1986	Incumbent term-limited. New governor elected. Republican gain.	✓ Jim Geringer (Republican) 58.7%; Kathy Karpan (Democratic) 40.2%; Seaghan Uibreaslain (Libertarian) 1.1%

=== Territories and federal district ===
Territory	Incumbent	Party	First elected	Result	Candidates
District of Columbia	Sharon Pratt	Democratic	1990	Incumbent lost renomination. New mayor elected. Democratic hold.	✓ Marion Barry (Democratic) 56.0%; Carol Schwartz (Republican) 41.9%
Guam	Joseph Franklin Ada	Republican	1986	Incumbent retired. New governor elected. Democratic gain.	✓ Carl Gutierrez (Democratic) 54.8%; Tommy Tanaka (Republican) 45.2%
U.S. Virgin Islands	Alexander Farrelly	Democratic	1986	Incumbent term-limited. New governor elected. Independent gain.	✓ Roy Schneider (Independent) 54.7%; Derek Hodge (Democratic) 42.6%

== Closest races ==
States where the margin of victory was under 1%:

1. Alaska, 0.2%
2. Maryland, 0.4%
3. Alabama, 0.9%

States where the margin of victory was under 5%:

1. Florida, 1.5%
2. Maine, 1.5%
3. Georgia, 2.1%
4. South Carolina, 2.5%
5. New York, 3.3%
6. Connecticut, 3.5%
7. Rhode Island, 3.8%

States where the margin of victory was under 10%:

1. Pennsylvania, 5.5%
2. Hawaii, 5.9%
3. Texas, 7.6%
4. Arizona, 8.2%
5. Idaho, 8.4%
6. Oregon, 8.5%
7. Tennessee, 9.6%
8. Guam, 9.7%
9. New Mexico, 9.9%

== Alabama ==
1994 Alabama gubernatorial election
- November 8, 1994
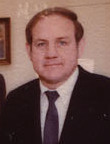

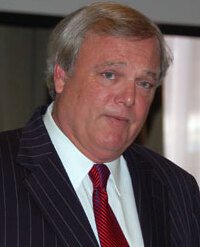
Nominee	Fob James	Jim Folsom Jr.
Party	Republican	Democratic
Popular vote	604,926	594,169
Percentage	50.33%	49.43%
- County results James: 50–60% 60–70% 70–80% Folsom: 50–60% 60–70% 70–80% 80–90%
Governor before election
Jim Folsom Jr.
Democratic
Elected Governor
Fob James
Republican

The 1994 Alabama gubernatorial election was held on November 8, 1994, to select the governor of Alabama. The election saw Republican Fob James defeat incumbent Democrat Jim Folsom Jr. in an upset. This was the first of three consecutive Alabama gubernatorial elections where the incumbent was defeated.

== Alaska ==
1994 Alaska gubernatorial election
- November 8, 1994
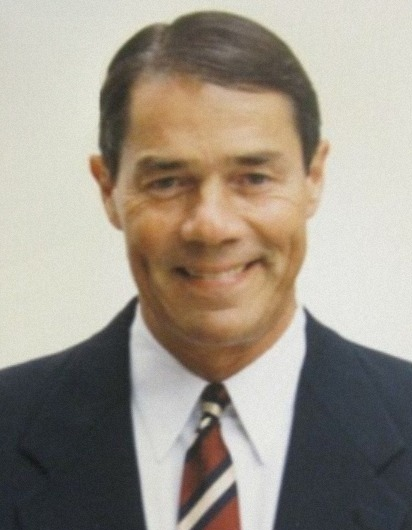

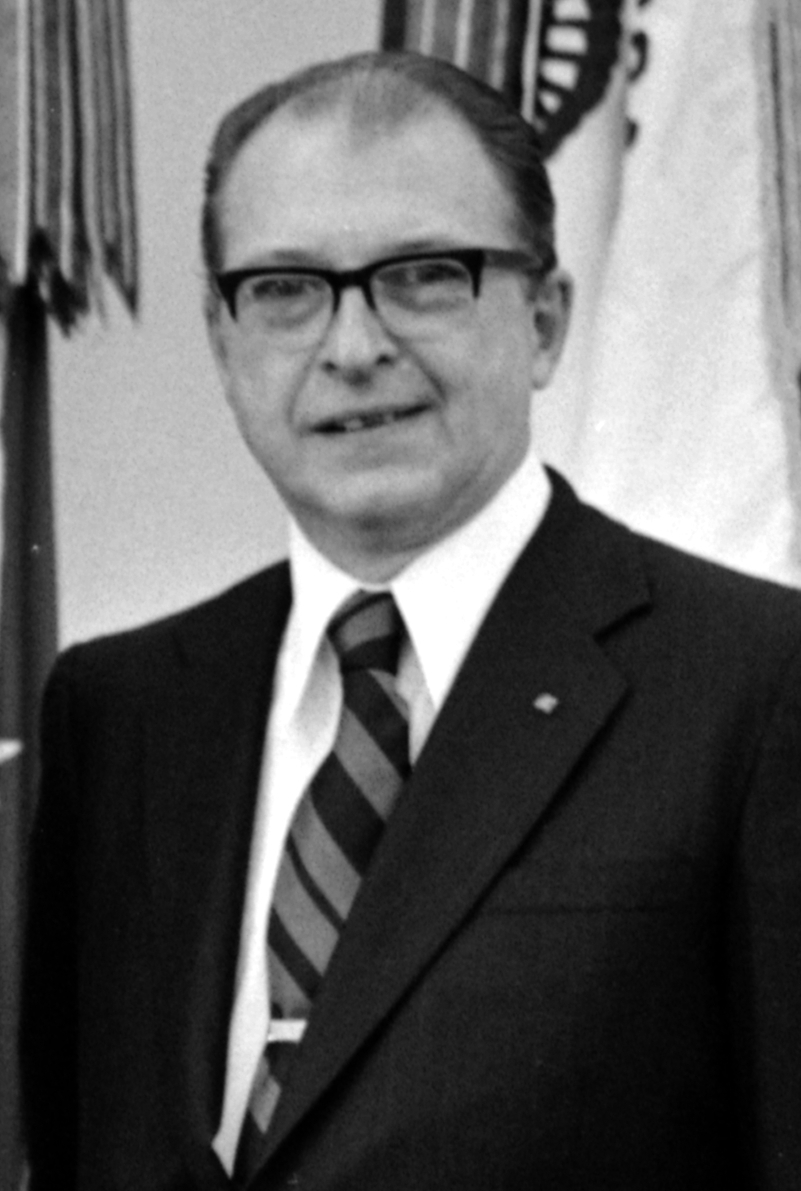
Nominee	Tony Knowles	Jim Campbell	Jack Coghill
Party	Democratic	Republican	Independence
Running mate	Fran Ulmer	Mike W. Miller	Margaret Ward
Popular vote	87,693	87,157	27,838
Percentage	41.08%	40.84%	13.04%
- Results by state house district Knowles: 30–40% 40–50% 50–60% 60–70% 70–80% Campbell: 30–40% 40–50% 50–60%
Governor before election
Wally Hickel
Republican
Elected Governor
Tony Knowles
Democratic

The 1994 Alaska gubernatorial election took place on November 8, 1994, for the post of Governor of Alaska, United States. Democratic candidate Tony Knowles narrowly defeated Republican candidate Jim Campbell and Lieutenant Governor Jack Coghill of the Alaskan Independence Party. In the Republican Revolution year of the 1994 elections, Alaska's was the only governor's seat in the country to switch from Republican to Democratic.

== Arizona ==
1994 Arizona gubernatorial election
- November 8, 1994
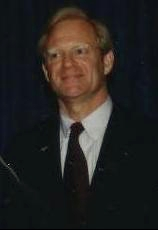

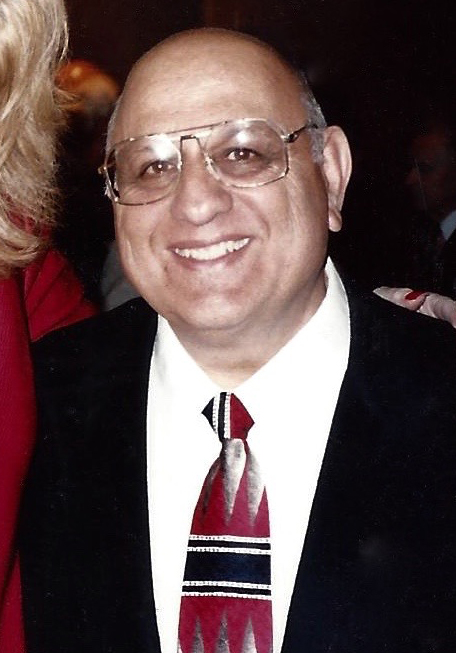
Nominee	Fife Symington	Eddie Basha
Party	Republican	Democratic
Popular vote	593,492	500,702
Percentage	52.5%	44.3%
- County results Symington: 40–50% 50-60% 60–70% Basha: 50–60% 70–80%
Governor before election
Fife Symington
Republican
Elected Governor
Fife Symington
Republican

The 1994 Arizona gubernatorial election took place on November 8, 1994, for the post of Governor of Arizona. Fife Symington, the incumbent Republican Governor of Arizona, defeated the Democratic nominee Eddie Basha to win a second term in office. However, Symington resigned in 1997 due to a federal indictment on corruption charges.

== Arkansas ==
1994 Arkansas gubernatorial election
- November 8, 1994
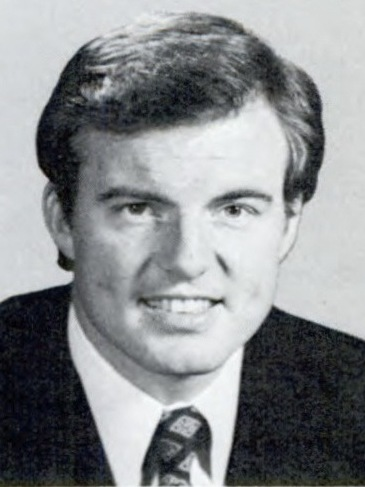

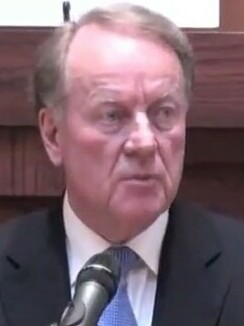
Nominee	Jim Guy Tucker	Sheffield Nelson
Party	Democratic	Republican
Popular vote	428,936	287,904
Percentage	59.84%	40.16%
- County results Tucker: 50–60% 60–70% 70–80% Nelson: 50–60%
Governor before election
Jim Guy Tucker
Democratic
Elected Governor
Jim Guy Tucker
Democratic

The 1994 Arkansas gubernatorial election took place on November 8, 1994, as a part of the United States gubernatorial elections, 1994.

== California ==
1994 California gubernatorial election
- November 8, 1994
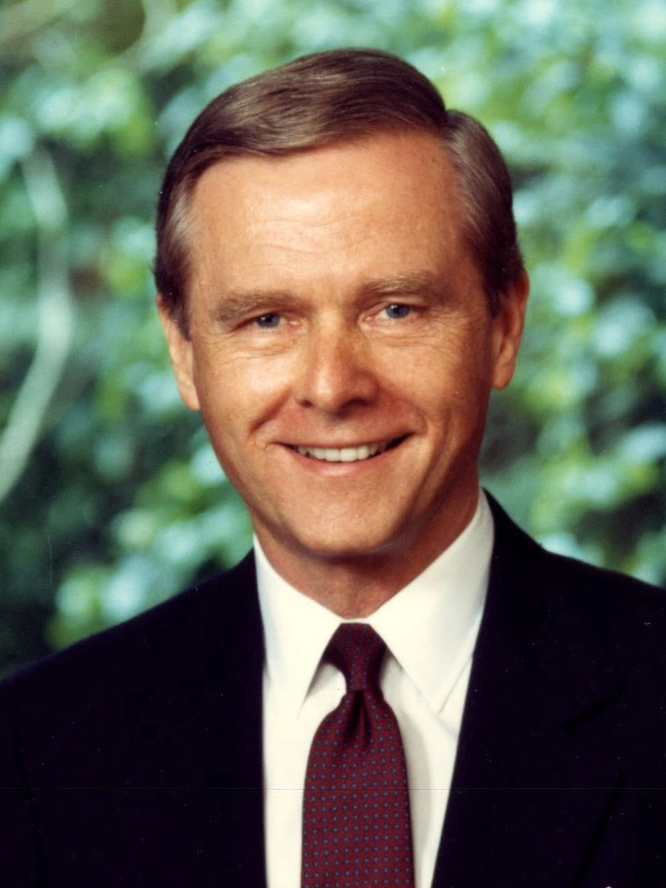

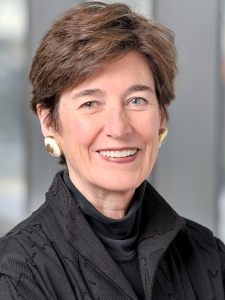
Nominee	Pete Wilson	Kathleen Brown
Party	Republican	Democratic
Popular vote	4,781,766	3,519,799
Percentage	55.18%	40.62%
- Wilson: 40–50% 50–60% 60–70% 70–80% Brown: 40–50% 50–60% 60–70% 70–80%
Governor before election
Pete Wilson
Republican
Elected Governor
Pete Wilson
Republican

The 1994 California gubernatorial election was held on November 8, 1994, in the midst of that year's "Republican Revolution". Incumbent Republican Pete Wilson easily won re-election over his main challenger, Democratic State Treasurer Kathleen Brown, the daughter of Pat Brown and younger sister of Jerry Brown, both of whom had previously served as governor. Primaries were held on June 3, 1994.

== Colorado ==
1994 Colorado gubernatorial election
- November 8, 1994
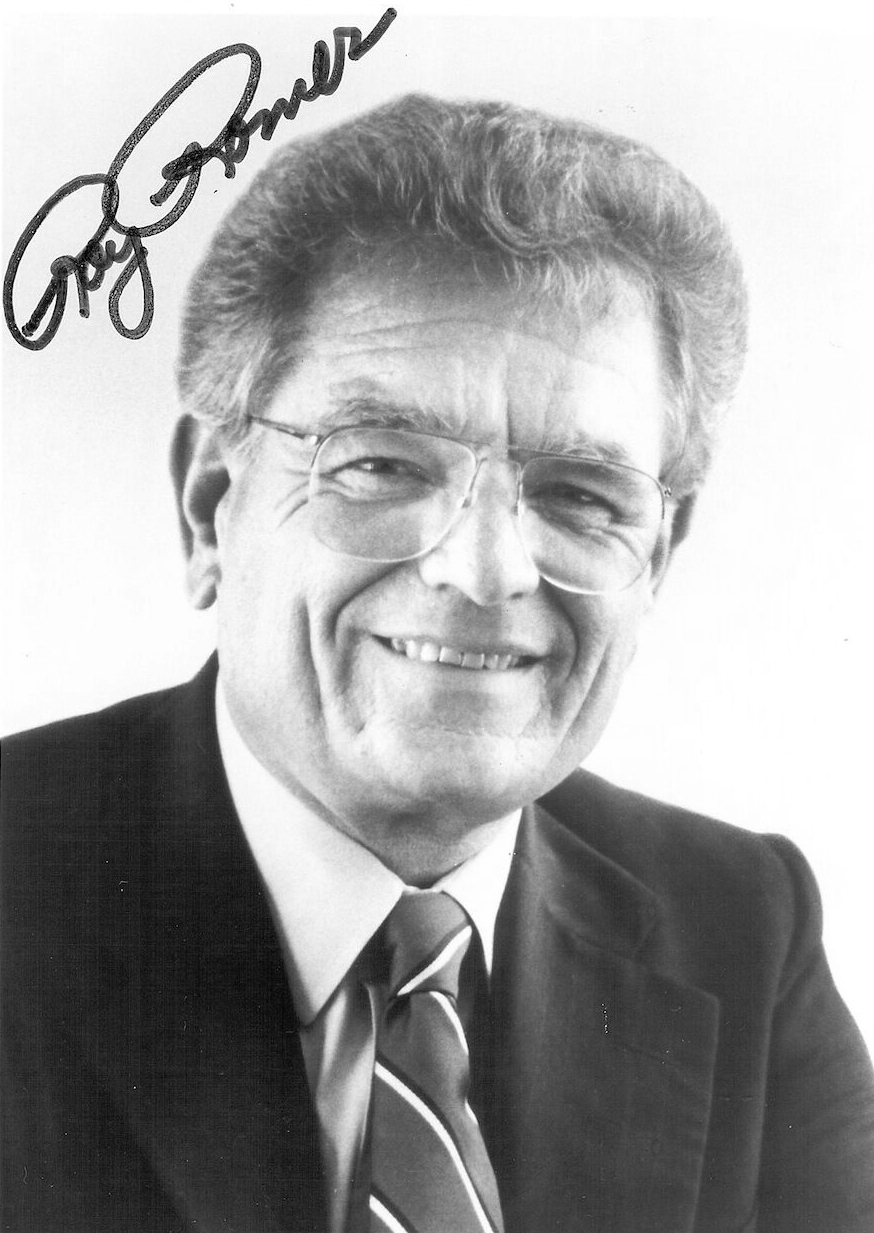

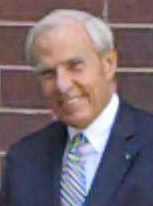
Nominee	Roy Romer	Bruce D. Benson
Party	Democratic	Republican
Running mate	Gail Schoettler	Bob Schaeffer
Popular vote	619,205	432,042
Percentage	55.5%	38.7%
- County results Romer: 40–50% 50–60% 60–70% 70–80% Benson: 40–50% 50–60% 60–70% 70–80%
Governor before election
Roy Romer
Democratic
Elected Governor
Roy Romer
Democratic

The 1994 Colorado gubernatorial election was held on November 8, 1994, to select the governor of the state of Colorado. Although Colorado voters passed a term limits ballot measure in 1990 limiting the governors to two terms, it included a provision for Roy Romer, the Democratic incumbent, to be able to run for reelection for a third term. The Republican nominee, Chairman of the Colorado Republican Party, Bruce D. Benson, lost by a margin of nearly 18 percent.

== Connecticut ==
1994 Connecticut gubernatorial election
- November 8, 1994
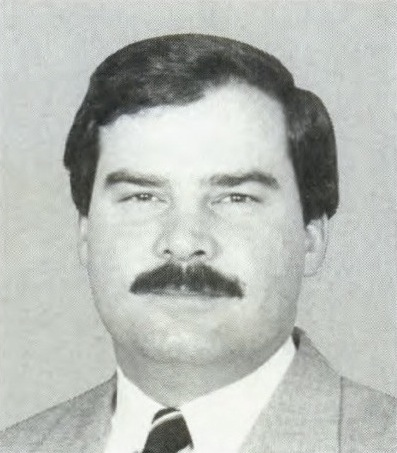

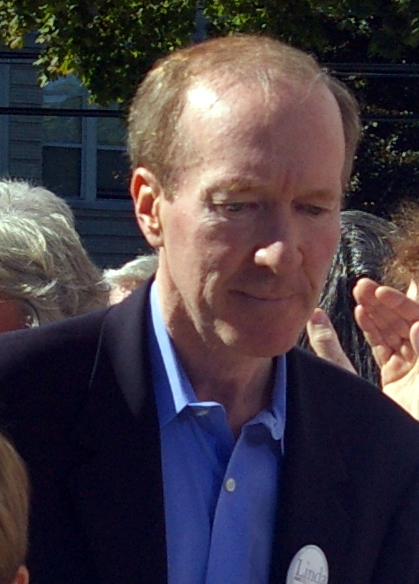
Nominee	John G. Rowland	Bill Curry
Party	Republican	Democratic
Running mate	Jodi Rell	Joe Ganim
Popular vote	415,201	375,133
Percentage	36.2%	32.7%
Nominee	Eunice Groark	Tom Scott
Party	A Connecticut Party	Independent
Running mate	Audrey Rowe	Glen O'Keefe
Popular vote	216,585	130,128
Percentage	18.9%	11.3%
- Rowland: 20–30% 30–40% 40–50% 50–60% 60–70% Curry: 20–30% 30–40% 40–50% 50–60% 60–70% Groark: 30–40%
Governor before election
Lowell Weicker
A Connecticut Party
Elected Governor
John G. Rowland
Republican

The 1994 Connecticut gubernatorial election took place on November 8, 1994, to elect the governor of Connecticut. Republican John G. Rowland won the open seat following the retirement of A Connecticut Party Governor Lowell Weicker. The election was a four-way race between A Connecticut Party Lieutenant Governor Eunice Groark, Republican U.S. Congressman John G. Rowland, Democratic state comptroller Bill Curry, and independent conservative talk show host Tom Scott. Rowland won the election with just 36% of the vote.

== Florida ==
1994 Florida gubernatorial election
- November 8, 1994
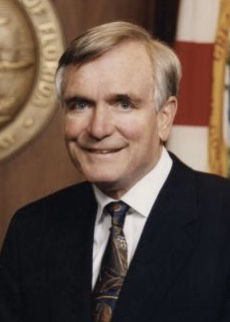

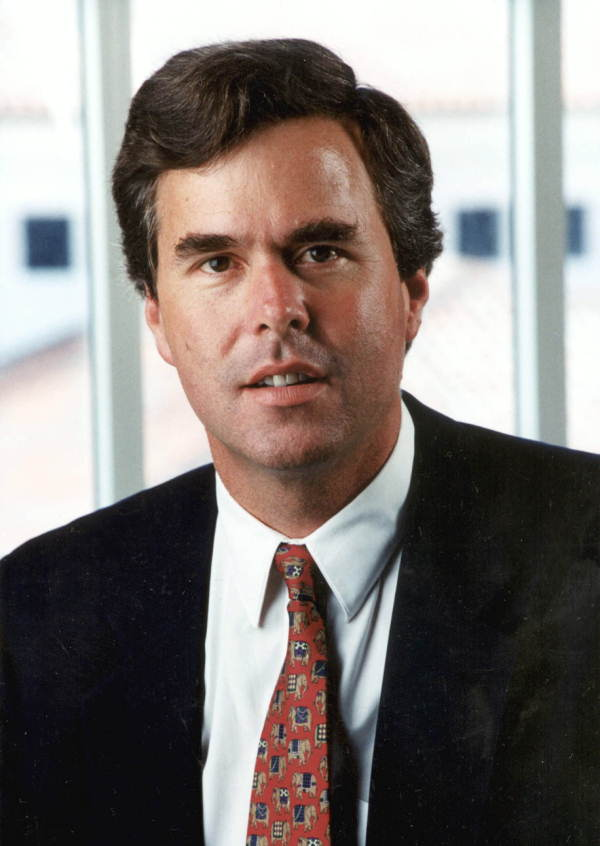
Nominee	Lawton Chiles	Jeb Bush
Party	Democratic	Republican
Running mate	Buddy MacKay	Tom Feeney
Popular vote	2,135,008	2,071,068
Percentage	50.75%	49.23%
- Chiles: 50–60% 60–70% 70–80% 80–90% >90% Bush: 50–60% 60–70% 70–80% 80–90% >90% Tie: 50% No votes
Governor before election
Lawton Chiles
Democratic
Elected Governor
Lawton Chiles
Democratic

The 1994 Florida gubernatorial election was held on November 8, 1994. Incumbent Democratic governor Lawton Chiles won re-election over Republican Jeb Bush, who later won Florida's governorship in 1998 when Chiles was term-limited. This race was the second-closest gubernatorial election in Florida history since Reconstruction, due to the strong Republican wave of 1994.

== Georgia ==
1994 Georgia gubernatorial election
- November 8, 1994
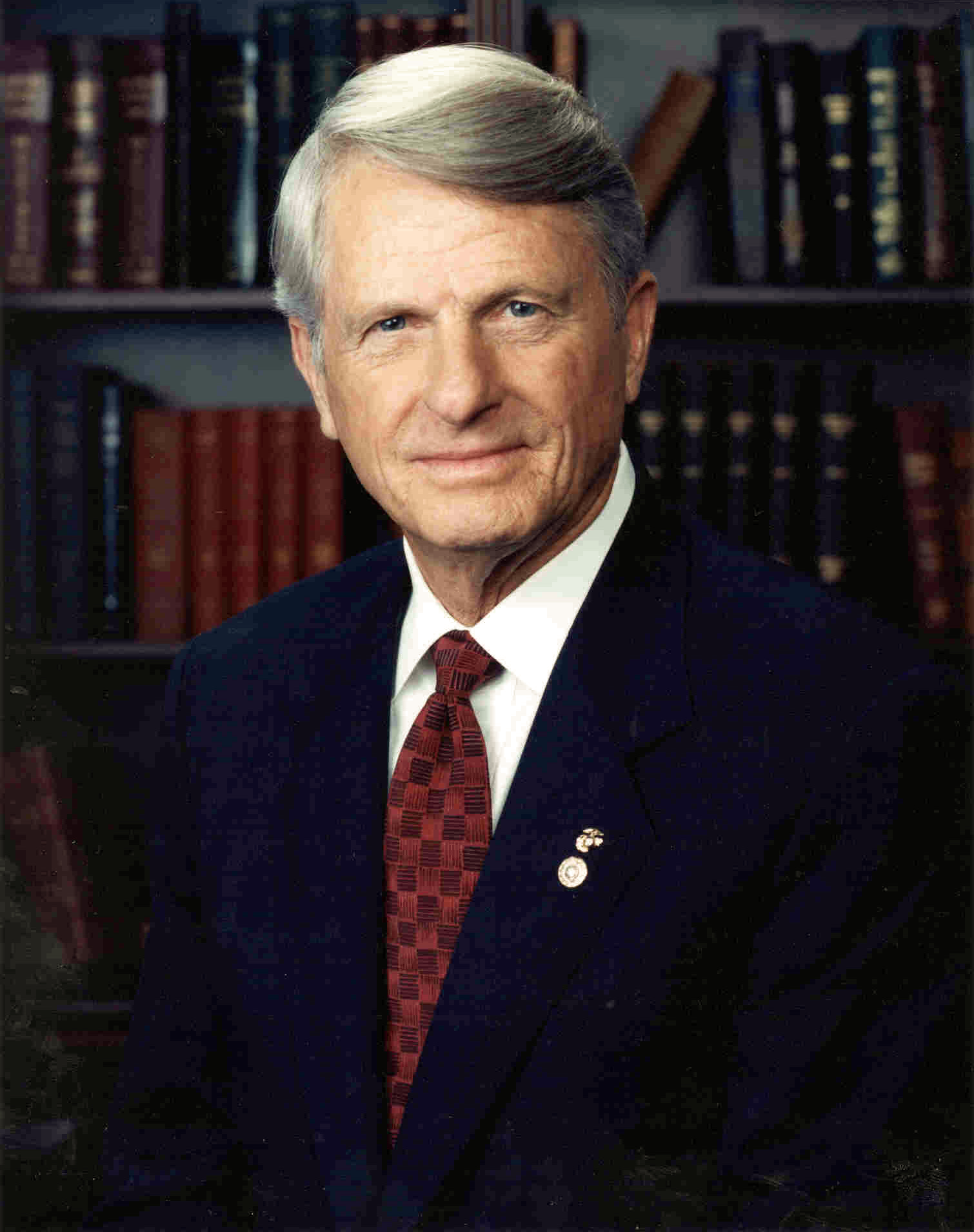

Nominee	Zell Miller	Guy Millner
Party	Democratic	Republican
Popular vote	788,926	756,371
Percentage	51.05%	48.95%
- County results Miller: 50–60% 60–70% 70–80% Millner: 50–60% 60–70% 70–80%
Governor before election
Zell Miller
Democratic
Elected Governor
Zell Miller
Democratic

The 1994 Georgia gubernatorial election occurred on November 8, 1994, to elect the next governor of Georgia from 1995 to 1999. Incumbent Democratic governor Zell Miller, first elected in 1990, ran for a second term. In his party's primary, Miller received three challengers, but easily prevailed with just over 70% of the vote. The contest for the Republican nomination, however, was a competitive race. As no candidate received a majority of the vote, John Knox and Guy Millner advanced to a run-off election. Millner was victorious and received the Republican nomination after garnering 59.41% of the vote.

The general election was a competitive race between Zell Miller and Guy Millner. Issues such as welfare reform, education, and the removal of the Confederate battle flag from Georgia's state flag dominated the election. On election day, Miller defeated Millner 51.05%-48.95% in the third-closest gubernatorial election in Georgian history – behind only the 2018 and 1966 elections – since Reconstruction due to the strong Republican wave of 1994.

== Hawaii ==
1994 Hawaii gubernatorial election
- November 8, 1994
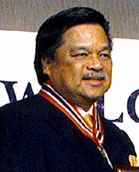

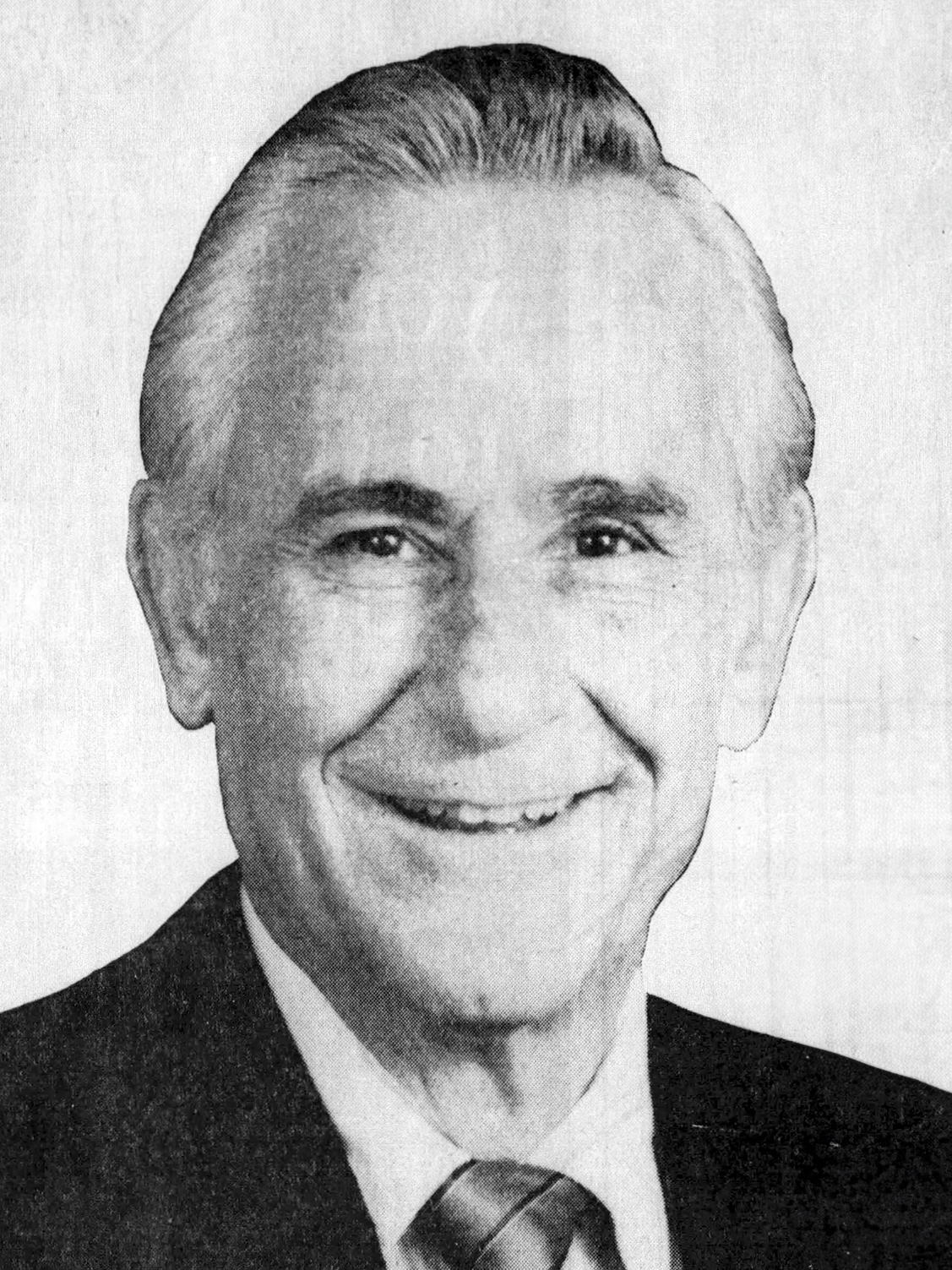

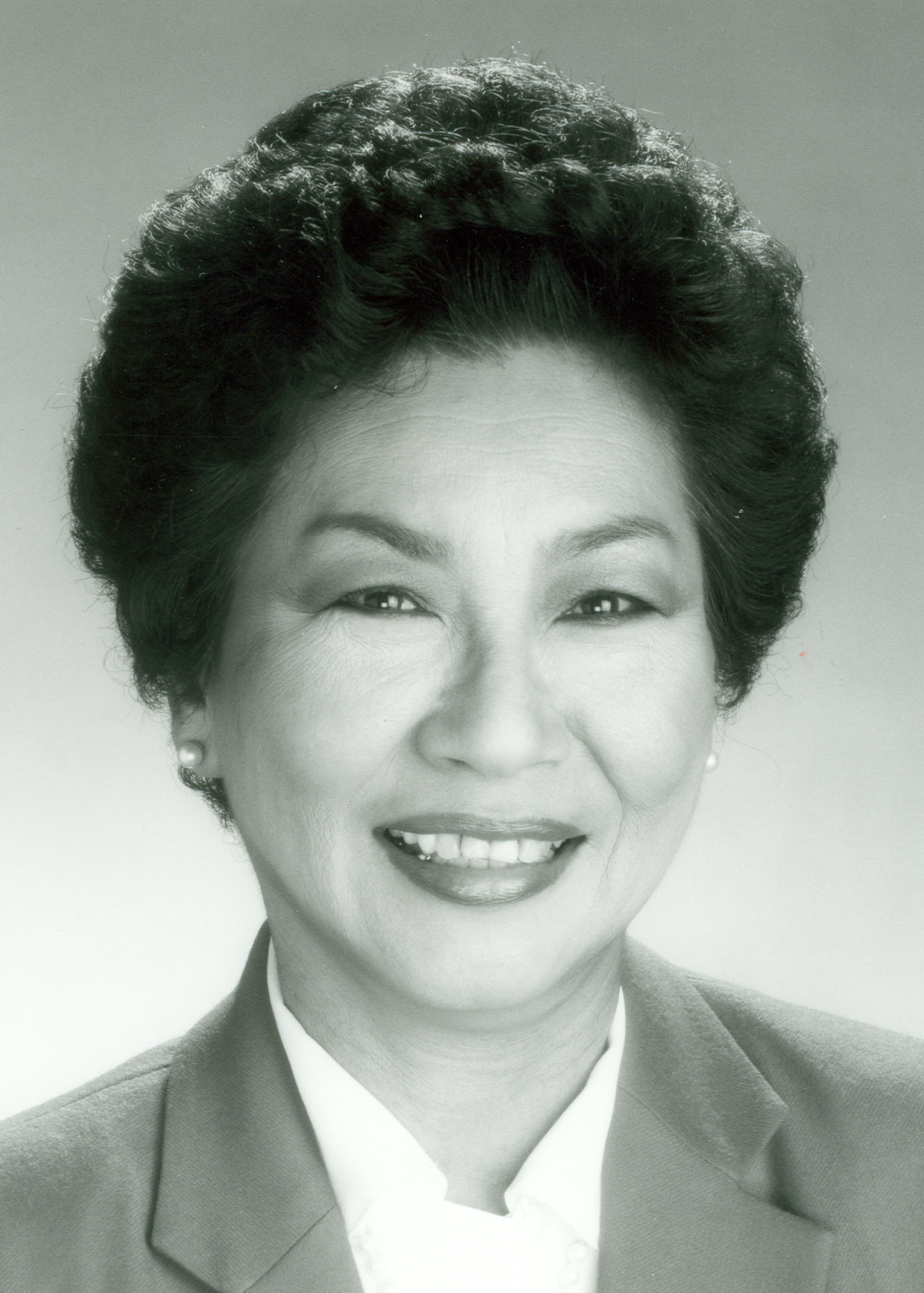
Nominee	Ben Cayetano	Frank Fasi	Pat Saiki
Party	Democratic	BPH	Republican
Running mate	Mazie Hirono	Danny Kaleikini	Fred Hemmings
Popular vote	134,978	113,158	107,908
Percentage	36.6%	30.7%	29.2%
- County results Cayetano: 30–40% 40–50%
Governor before election
John Waihee
Democratic
Elected Governor
Ben Cayetano
Democratic

The 1994 Hawaii gubernatorial election was held on November 3, 1994. Incumbent Democratic Governor of Hawaii John D. Waihee III was prevented from seeking a third term as Governor due to term limits, creating an open seat. Lieutenant Governor Ben Cayetano emerged from a crowded primary to become the Democratic nominee, facing off against former Administrator of the Small Business Administration Pat Saiki, the Republican nominee and Honolulu Mayor Frank Fasi, who ran as the Best Party of Hawaii's nominee. In a very close election, Cayetano beat Fasi, who placed second, by six percentage points and Saiki, who placed third, winning only a plurality of the vote. Fasi's performance was notable in that it was the best performance by a third party gubernatorial candidate in Hawaii's history.

== Idaho ==
1994 Idaho gubernatorial election
- November 8, 1994
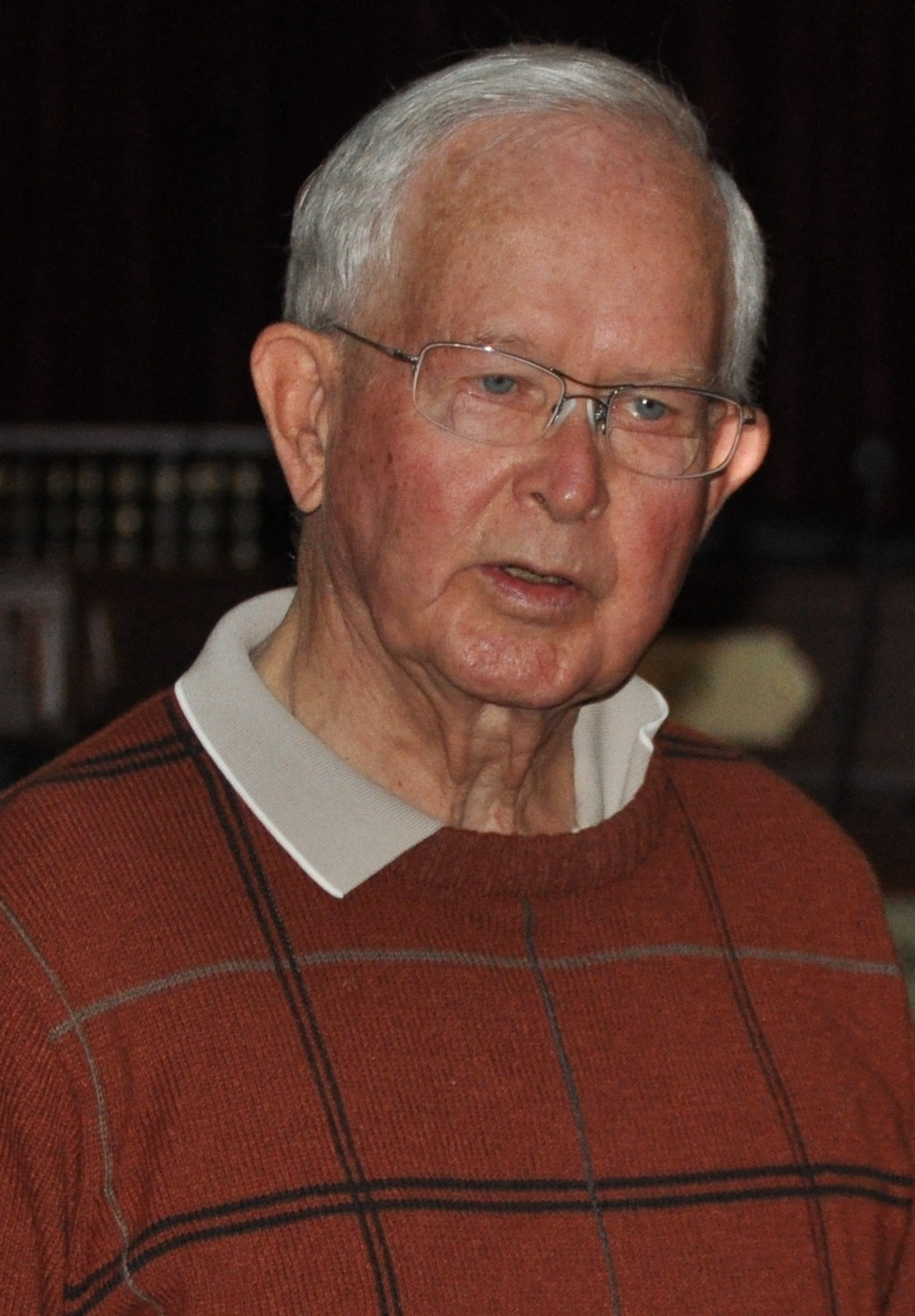

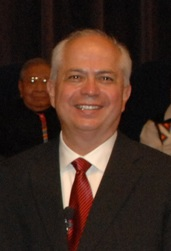
Nominee	Phil Batt	Larry Echo Hawk
Party	Republican	Democratic
Popular vote	216,123	181,363
Percentage	52.3%	43.9%
- County results Batt: 40–50% 50–60% 60–70% 70–80% Echo Hawk: 50–60% 60–70%
Governor before election
Cecil Andrus
Democratic
Elected Governor
Phil Batt
Republican

The 1994 Idaho gubernatorial election was held on November 8 to select the governor of the U.S. state of Idaho. Democratic incumbent Cecil Andrus chose not to seek reelection after a total of fourteen years in office. Former state senator and Republican Party chair Phil Batt rallied to defeat Democratic attorney general Larry Echo Hawk; the victory was the first by a Republican in 28 years.

== Illinois ==
1994 Illinois gubernatorial election
- November 8, 1994
- Turnout: 50.77% ▼3.23 pp
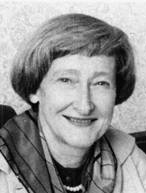
Nominee	Jim Edgar	Dawn Clark Netsch
Party	Republican	Democratic
Running mate	Bob Kustra	Penny Severns
Popular vote	1,984,318	1,069,850
Percentage	63.87%	34.44%
- County results Edgar: 50-60% 60-70% 70-80% 80-90% Netsch: 40–50%
Governor before election
Jim Edgar
Republican
Elected Governor
Jim Edgar
Republican

The 1994 Illinois gubernatorial election was held on November 8, 1994. Incumbent Republican Governor Jim Edgar won reelection in the largest landslide in over a century, after the elections of 1818 and 1848.

== Iowa ==
1994 Iowa gubernatorial election
- November 8, 1994
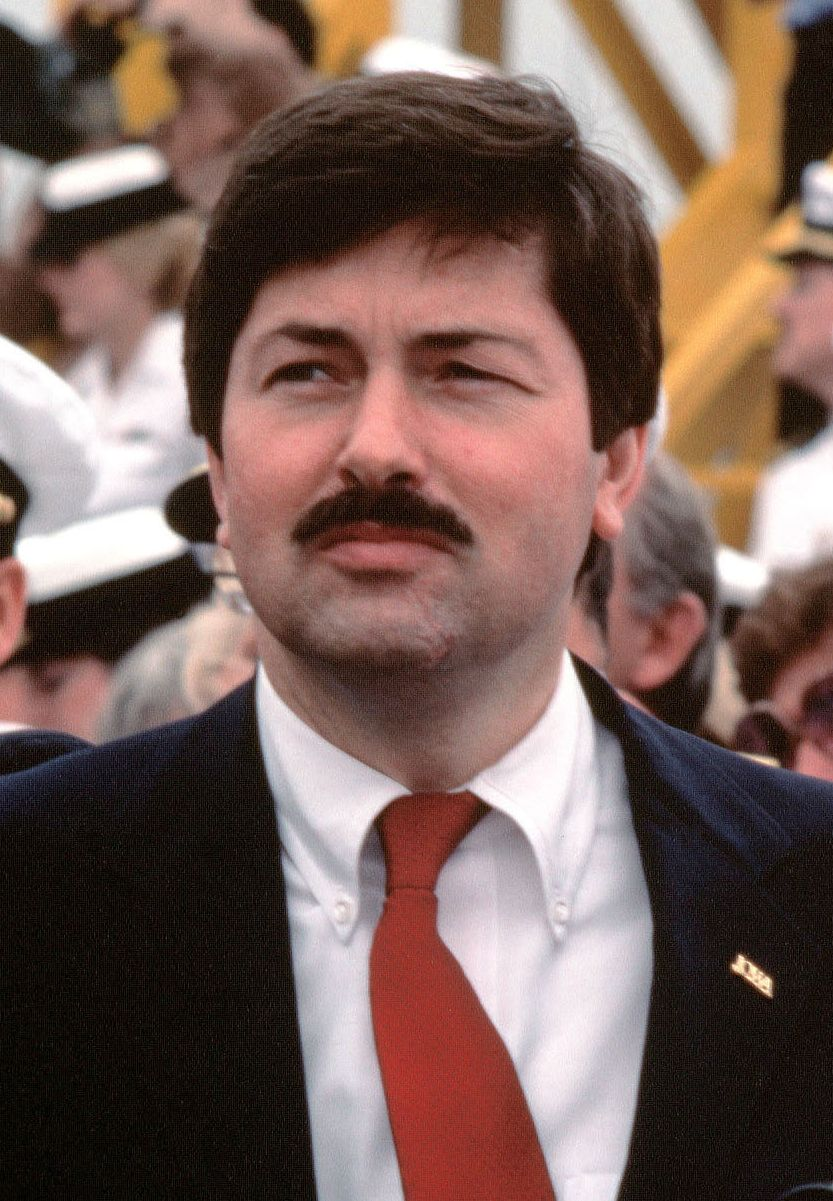

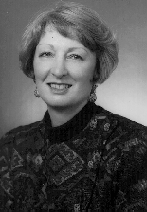
Nominee	Terry Branstad	Bonnie Campbell
Party	Republican	Democratic
Popular vote	566,395	414,453
Percentage	56.8%	41.6%
- County results Branstad: 40-50% 50-60% 60-70% 70-80% 80-90% Campbell: 40–50% 50–60%
Governor before election
Terry Branstad
Republican
Elected Governor
Terry Branstad
Republican

The 1994 Iowa gubernatorial election took place November 8, 1994. Incumbent Republican Governor of Iowa Terry Branstad ran for re-election to a fourth term as governor. Branstad narrowly defeated a tough challenger in his primary election, emerging victorious by 11,419 votes. On the Democratic side, Attorney General of Iowa Bonnie Campbell won her party's nomination and both Branstad and Campbell moved on to the general election. Branstad ultimately won re-election to a fourth term as governor, defeating Campbell in a landslide.

== Kansas ==
1994 Kansas gubernatorial election
- November 8, 1994
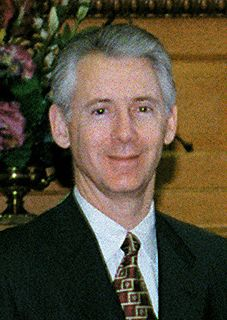

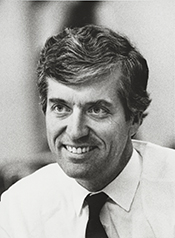
Nominee	Bill Graves	Jim Slattery
Party	Republican	Democratic
Popular vote	526,113	333,589
Percentage	61.1%	38.9%
- County results Graves: 50–60% 60–70% 70–80% 80–90% Slattery: 50–60%
Governor before election
Joan Finney
Democratic
Elected Governor
Bill Graves
Republican

The 1994 Kansas gubernatorial election included Republican Bill Graves who won the open seat vacated by the pending retirement of Governor Joan Finney. He defeated Jim Slattery.

== Maine ==
1994 Maine gubernatorial election
- November 8, 1994
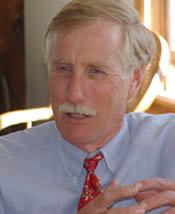

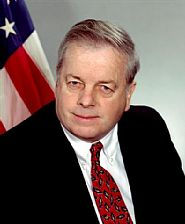

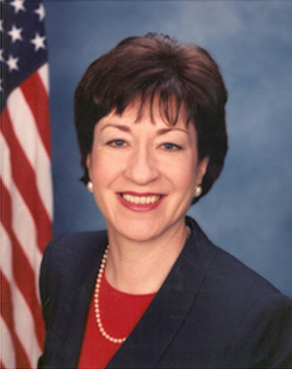

Nominee	Angus King	Joseph Brennan
Party	Independent	Democratic
Popular vote	180,829	172,951
Percentage	35.37%	33.83%
Nominee	Susan Collins	Jonathan Carter
Party	Republican	Green
Popular vote	117,990	32,695
Percentage	23.08%	6.39%
- King: 20–30% 30–40% 40–50% 50–60% 60–70% Brennan: 20–30% 30–40% 40–50% 50–60% 60–70% 70–80% Collins: 20–30% 30–40% 40–50% 50–60% 60–70% >90% Tie: 20–30% 30–40%
Governor before election
John R. McKernan, Jr.
Republican
Elected Governor
Angus King
Independent

The 1994 Maine gubernatorial election took place on November 8, 1994, to elect the governor of Maine. Incumbent Republican governor John McKernan was term-limited and could not seek re-election to a third consecutive term. Independent Angus King won the election.

King defeated Democratic nominee, former governor and congressman Joseph Brennan, Republican nominee Susan Collins, a regional coordinator of the Small Business Administration, and Green nominee Jonathan Carter, an environmentalist activist. Ed Finks, as a write-in candidate, received in 1.29% of the vote. This was the first election since 1974 that Maine elected an independent governor.

== Maryland ==
1994 Maryland gubernatorial election
- November 8, 1994
- Turnout: 60.67% ▲5.82%

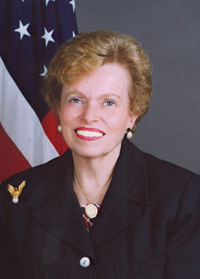
Nominee	Parris Glendening	Ellen Sauerbrey
Party	Democratic	Republican
Running mate	Kathleen Kennedy Townsend	Paul Rappaport
Popular vote	708,094	702,101
Percentage	50.21%	49.78%
- County results Glendening: 50-60% 60-70% 70-80% Sauerbrey: 50-60% 60-70% 70-80%
Governor before election
William Donald Schaefer
Democratic
Elected Governor
Parris Glendening
Democratic

The 1994 Maryland gubernatorial election was held on November 8, 1994. Incumbent Democratic governor William Donald Schaefer was ineligible for re-election. Prince George's County Executive Parris Glendening emerged victorious from the Democratic primary after defeating several candidates. Maryland House minority leader Ellen Sauerbrey, who would also be the 1998 Republican nominee for governor, won her party's nomination.

In the general election, Glendening narrowly defeated Sauerbrey by a margin of 50.21 percent to 49.78 percent, or by 5,993 votes, the closest gubernatorial election in Maryland since 1919 and the first gubernatorial election in Maryland history to be decided by an absentee runoff.

== Massachusetts ==
1994 Massachusetts gubernatorial election
- November 8, 1994
- Turnout: 70.05% ▼5.8
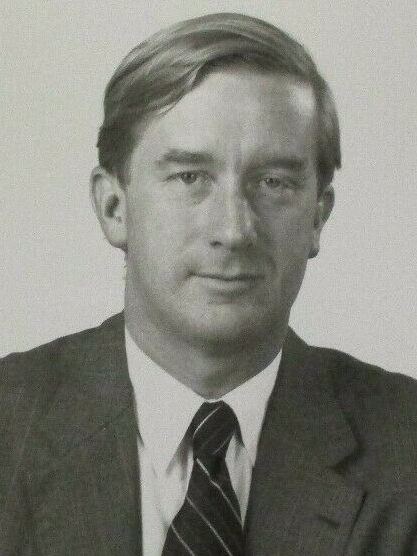

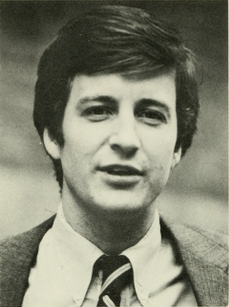
Nominee	Bill Weld	Mark Roosevelt
Party	Republican	Democratic
Running mate	Paul Cellucci	Bob Massie
Popular vote	1,533,390	611,650
Percentage	70.9%	28.3%
- Weld: 50–60% 60–70% 70–80% 80–90% Roosevelt: 50–60%
Governor before election
Bill Weld
Republican
Elected Governor
Bill Weld
Republican

The 1994 Massachusetts gubernatorial election was held on November 8, 1994. Incumbent Republican governor Bill Weld won reelection as Governor of Massachusetts by the largest margin in state history, winning every single county and all but 6 of the state's 351 municipalities. As of 2024, this is the most recent election in which Boston, Somerville, Lawrence, Chelsea, Brookline, Northampton, Provincetown, Monterey, Great Barrington, Ashfield, Williamstown, Williamsburg, Shelburne, Sunderland, and Pelham voted for the Republican candidate for governor.

== Michigan ==
1994 Michigan gubernatorial election
- November 8, 1994
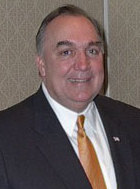

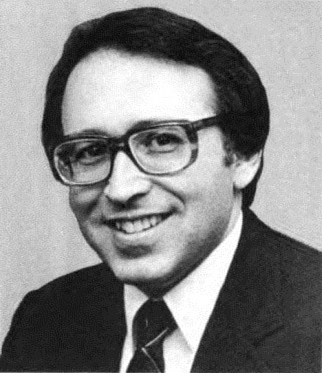
Nominee	John Engler	Howard Wolpe
Party	Republican	Democratic
Running mate	Connie Binsfeld	Debbie Stabenow
Popular vote	1,899,101	1,188,438
Percentage	61.5%	38.5%
- County results Engler: 50–60% 60–70% 70–80% 80–90% Wolpe: 50–60%
Governor before election
John Engler
Republican
Elected Governor
John Engler
Republican

The 1994 Michigan gubernatorial election was held on November 8, 1994, to elect the Governor and Lieutenant Governor of the state of Michigan. Incumbent Governor John Engler, a member of the Republican Party, was re-elected over Democratic Party nominee and Congressman Howard Wolpe. The voter turnout was 45.5%.

== Minnesota ==
1994 Minnesota gubernatorial election
- November 8, 1994
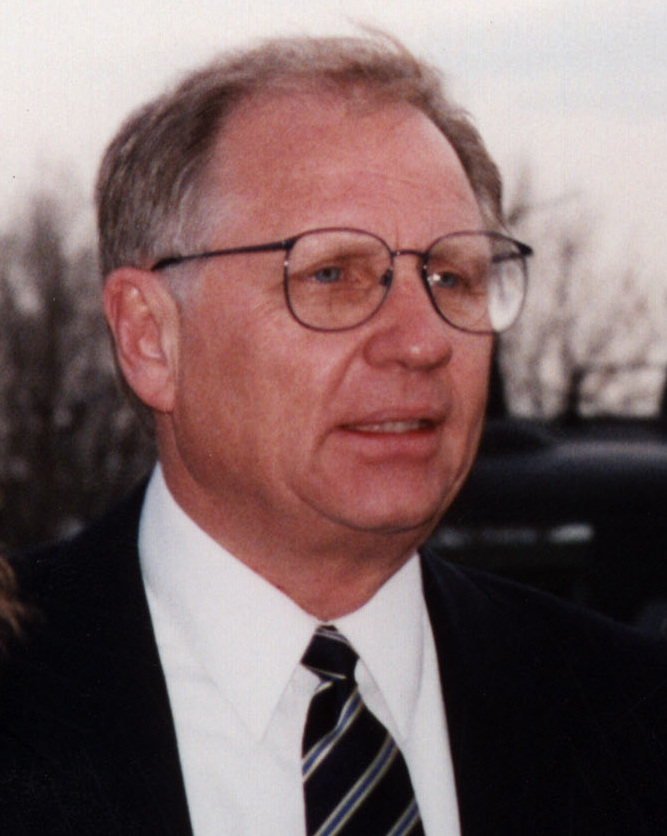

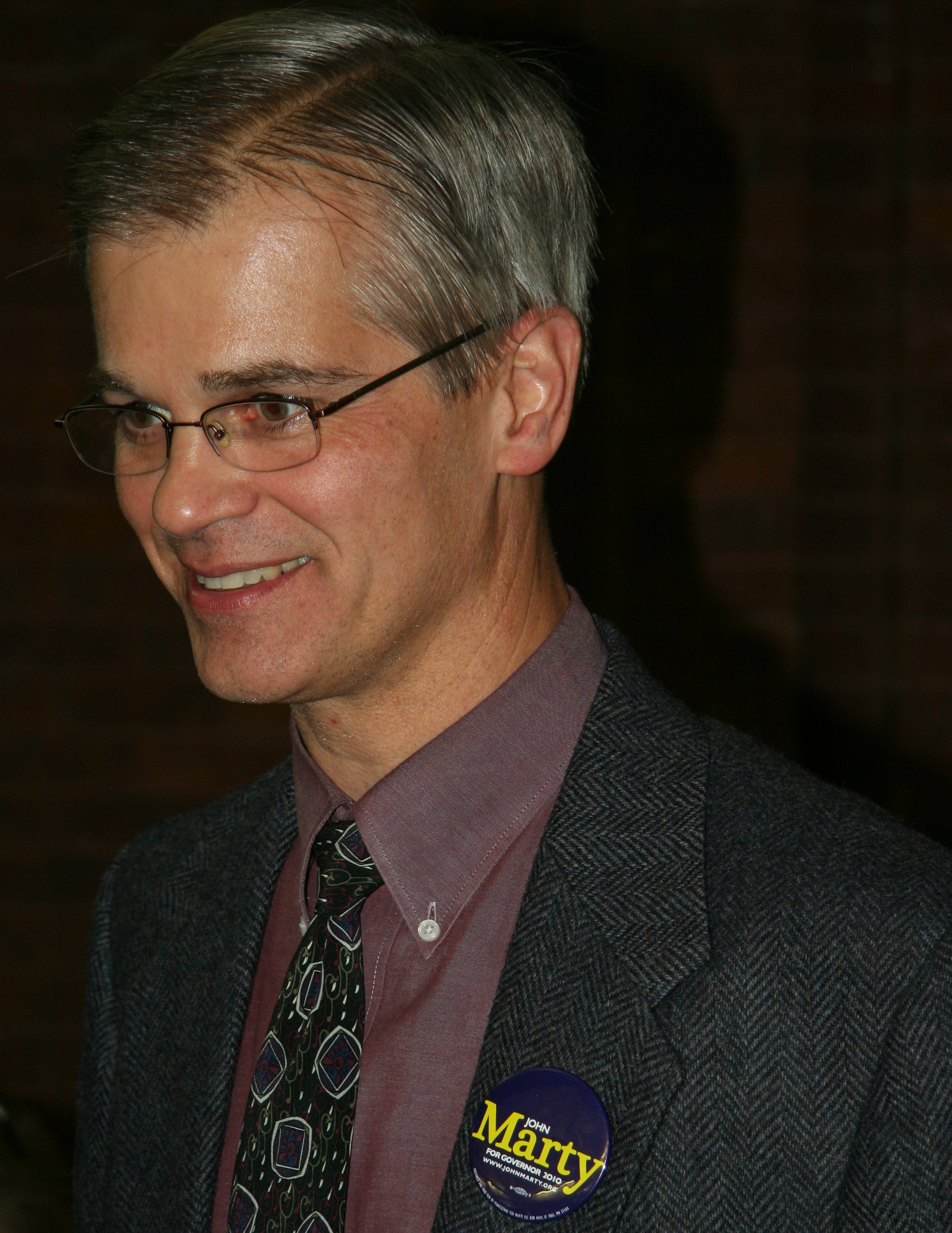
Nominee	Arne Carlson	John Marty
Party	Ind.-Republican	Democratic (DFL)
Running mate	Joanne Benson	Nancy Larson
Popular vote	1,094,165	589,344
Percentage	63.34%	34.12%
- Carlson: 30–40% 40–50% 50–60% 60–70% 70–80% 80–90% >90% Marty: 30–40% 40–50% 50–60% 60–70% 70–80% 80–90% >90% Tie: 40–50% 50% No votes
Governor before election
Arne Carlson
Republican
Elected Governor
Arne Carlson
Republican

The 1994 Minnesota gubernatorial election took place on November 8, 1994, in the midst of that year's Republican Revolution. Incumbent Republican Arne Carlson easily won re-election over Democrat–Farmer–Labor state senator John Marty.

== Nebraska ==
1994 Nebraska gubernatorial election
- November 8, 1994
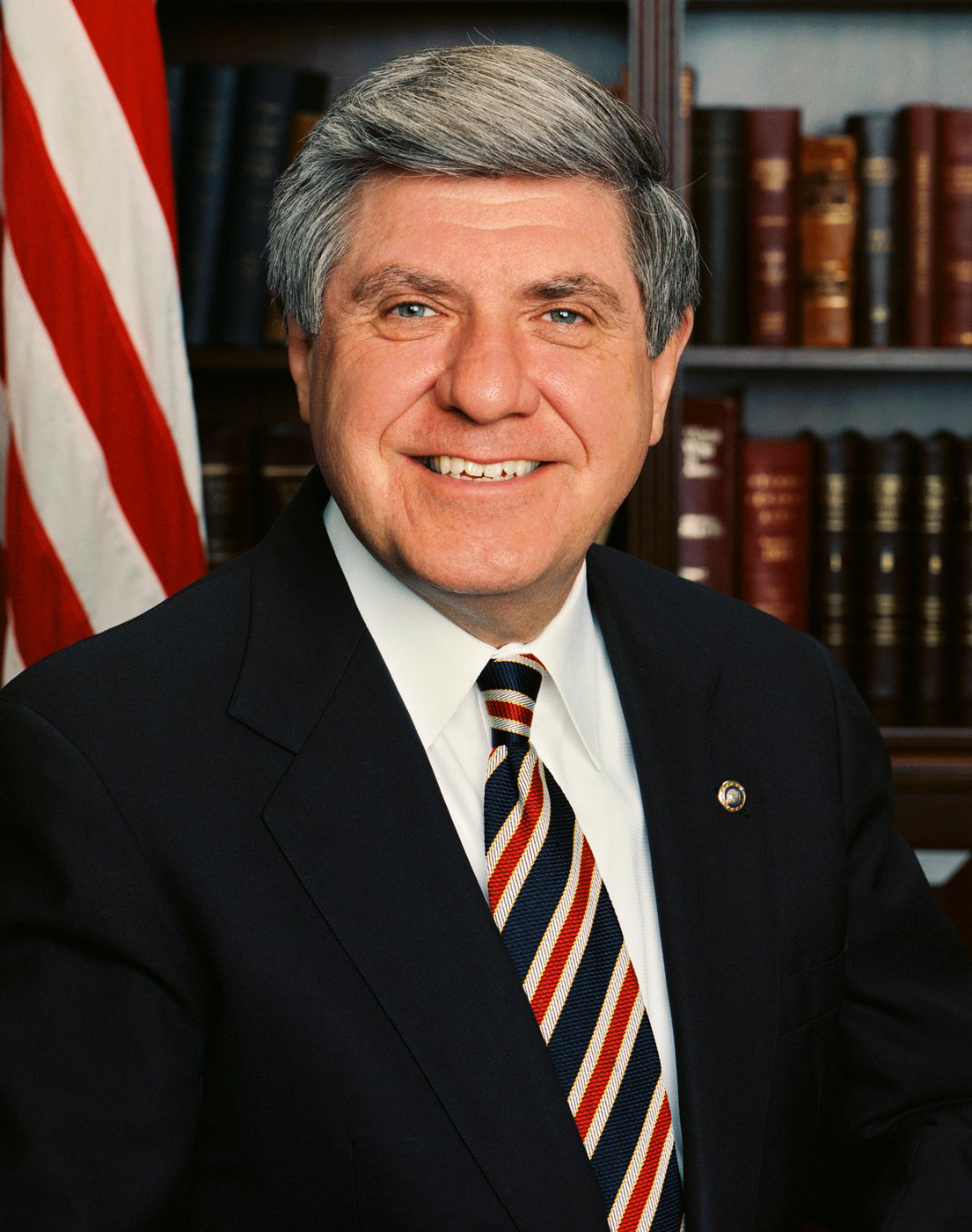

Nominee	Ben Nelson	Gene Spence
Party	Democratic	Republican
Running mate	Kim Robak	Kate Witek
Popular vote	423,270	148,230
Percentage	73.0%	25.6%
- County results Nelson: 50–60% 60–70% 70–80% 80–90% Spence: 50–60%
Governor before election
Ben Nelson
Democratic
Elected Governor
Ben Nelson
Democratic

The 1994 Nebraska gubernatorial election was held on November 8, 1994. Incumbent governor Ben Nelson won a re-election to a second term in a landslide, defeating Republican businessman Gene Spence by 47.4 percentage points and sweeping all but two counties in the state. As of 2026, this is the last time that a Democrat was elected governor of Nebraska.

== Nevada ==
1994 Nevada gubernatorial election
- November 8, 1994
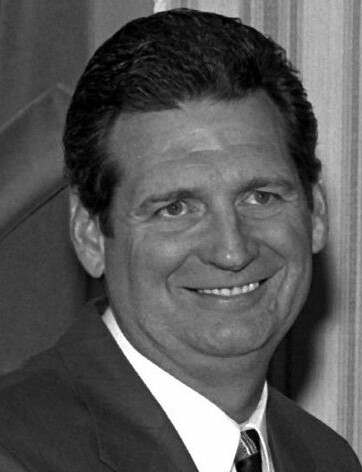

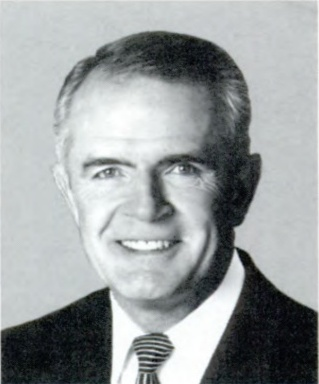
Nominee	Bob Miller	Jim Gibbons
Party	Democratic	Republican
Popular vote	200,026	156,875
Percentage	52.7%	41.3%
- County results Miller: 40–50% 50–60% Gibbons: 40–50% 50–60% 60–70%
Governor before election
Bob Miller
Democratic
Elected Governor
Bob Miller
Democratic

The 1994 Nevada gubernatorial election took place on November 8, 1994. Incumbent Democrat Bob Miller won re-election to a second term as Governor of Nevada, defeating Republican nominee Jim Gibbons (who would later go on to narrowly win the governorship in 2006, twelve years later). This would be the last victory by a Democrat in a governors race in Nevada until Steve Sisolak's victory in the 2018 election twenty-four years later, and remains the last time that a Democratic governor has won re-election. As of 2023, this is the last time that a gubernatorial nominee and a lieutenant gubernatorial nominee of different political parties were elected governor and lieutenant governor of Nevada respectively. This election was the first Nevada gubernatorial election since 1962 in which the winner of the gubernatorial election was of the same party as the incumbent president.

== New Hampshire ==
1994 New Hampshire gubernatorial election
- November 8, 1994
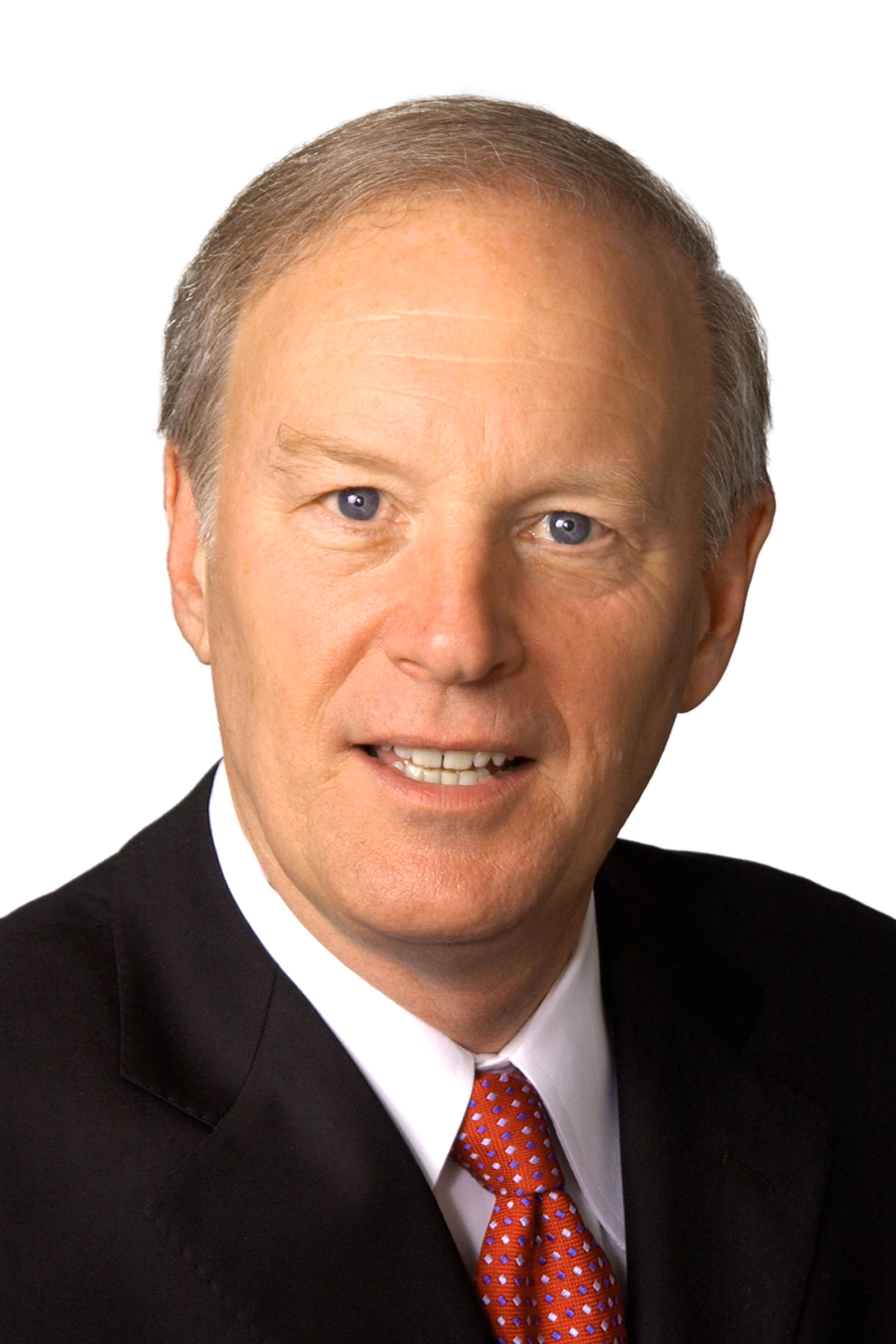

Nominee	Steve Merrill	Wayne King
Party	Republican	Democratic
Popular vote	218,134	79,686
Percentage	69.94%	25.55%
- Merrill: 40–50% 50–60% 60–70% 70–80% 80–90% >90% King: 40–50% 70–80%
Governor before election
Steve Merrill
Republican
Elected Governor
Steve Merrill
Republican

The 1994 New Hampshire gubernatorial election took place on November 8, 1994. Incumbent Governor Steve Merrill won re-election.

== New Mexico ==
1994 New Mexico gubernatorial election
- November 8, 1994
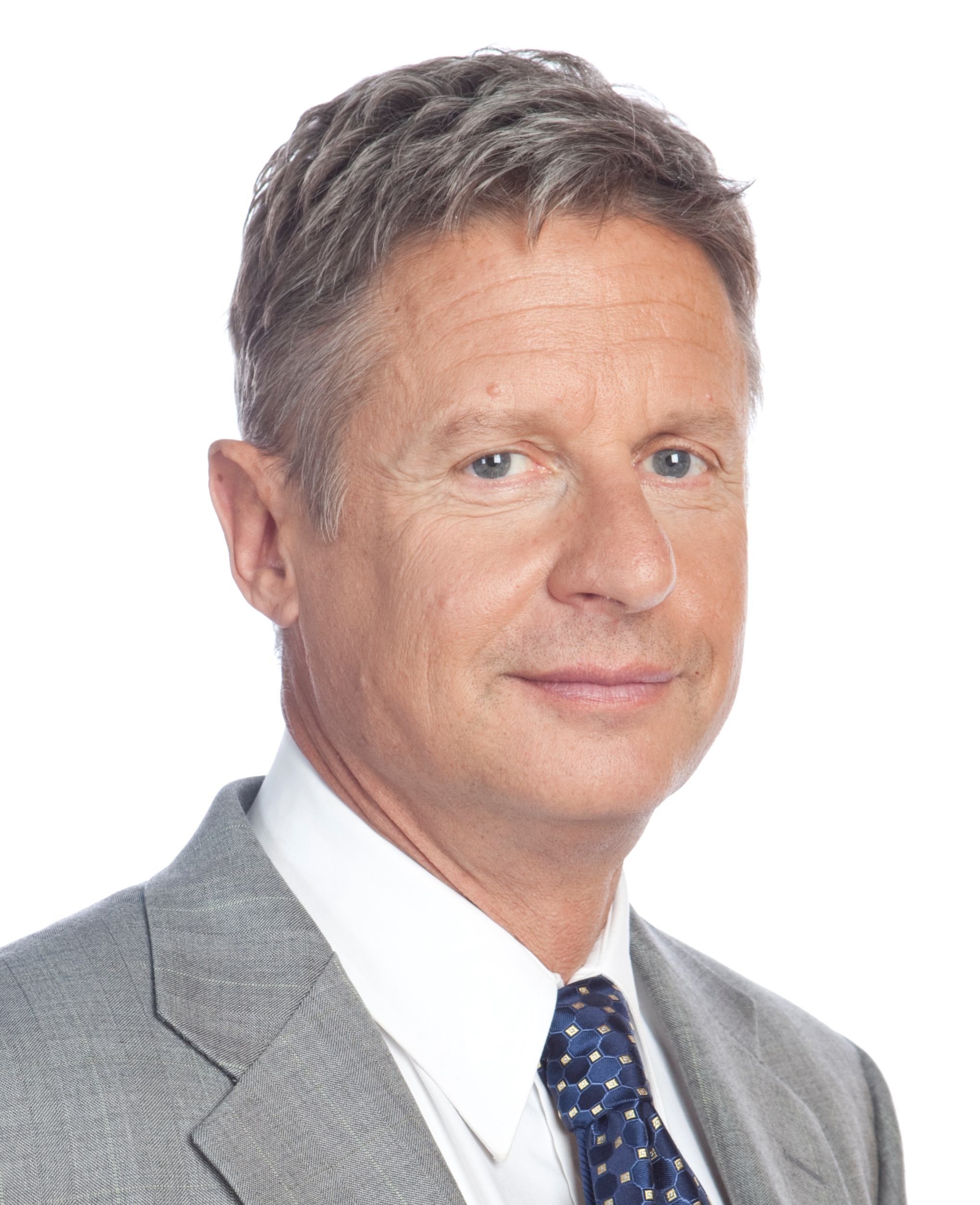

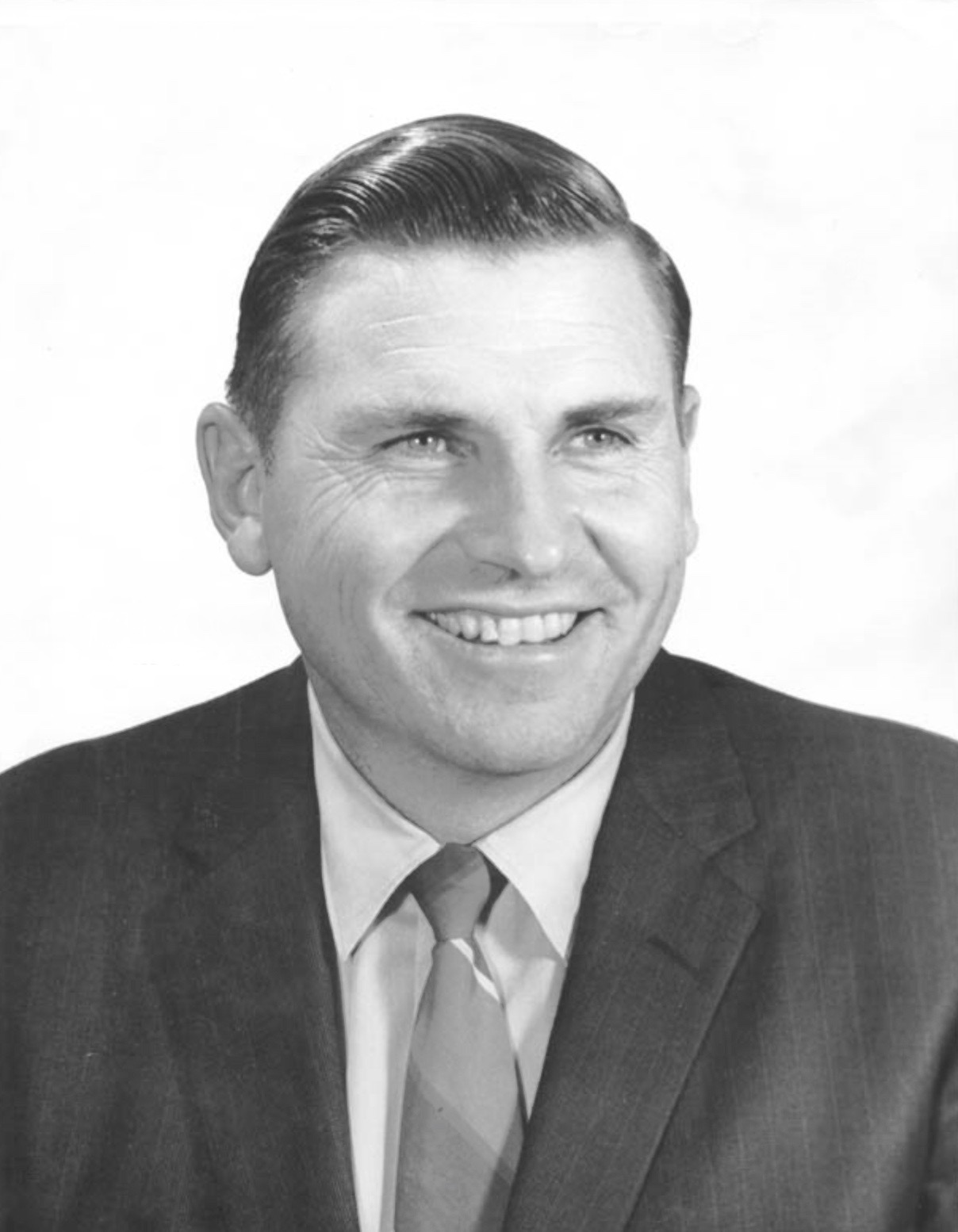

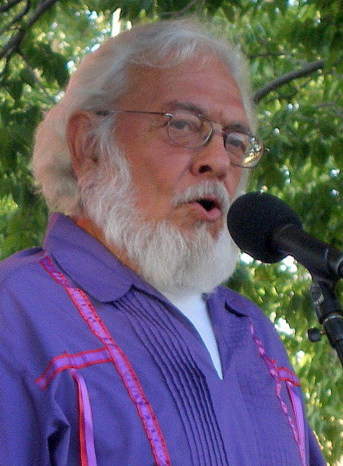
Nominee	Gary Johnson	Bruce King	Roberto Mondragón
Party	Republican	Democratic	Green
Running mate	Walter Bradley	Patricia A. Madrid	Steven Schmidt
Popular vote	232,945	186,686	47,990
Percentage	49.81%	39.92%	10.3%
- County results Johnson: 40–50% 50–60% 60–70% King: 40–50% 50–60%
Governor before election
Bruce King
Democratic
Elected Governor
Gary Johnson
Republican

The 1994 New Mexico gubernatorial election was held on November 8, 1994, for the four-year term beginning on January 1, 1995. Candidates for governor and lieutenant governor ran on a ticket as running mates.

Incumbent Democrat Bruce King ran for a fourth term with Patricia Madrid as a running mate, losing to Republican nominees Gary Johnson, a businessman, and Walter Bradley, a former state senator. Former Lieutenant Governor Roberto Mondragón ran with Steven Schmidt as the nominees of the Green Party, receiving 10.4 percent of the vote.

== New York ==
1994 New York gubernatorial election
- November 8, 1994
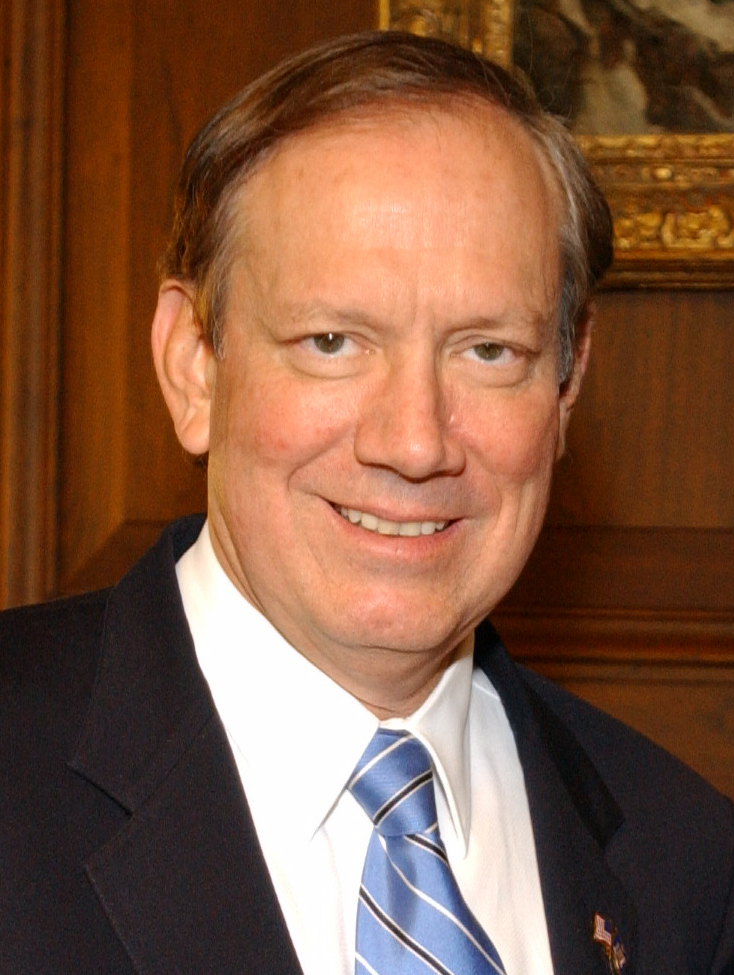

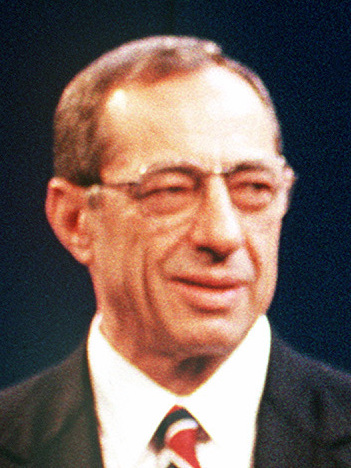
Nominee	George Pataki	Mario Cuomo
Party	Republican	Democratic
Alliance	Parties: Conservative; Tax Cut Now	Liberal
Running mate	Betsy McCaughey	Stan Lundine
Popular vote	2,538,702	2,364,904
Percentage	48.79%	45.45%
- County results Pataki: 40–50% 50–60% 60–70% 70–80% Cuomo: 50–60% 60–70% 70–80% 80–90%
Governor before election
Mario Cuomo
Democratic
Elected Governor
George Pataki
Republican

The 1994 New York gubernatorial election was an election for the state governorship held on November 8, 1994. Incumbent Democratic governor Mario Cuomo ran for a fourth term, but was defeated by Republican George Pataki in an upset victory. Pataki had previously been described by the New York Daily News as "a little-known Republican state senator." The conservative New York Post attributed the result to how voters "had grown tired of the 12-year incumbent Cuomo and his liberalism."

Pataki's victory was one of the most notable of the 1994 "Republican Revolution" midterm elections, which also ousted governors in Alabama, New Mexico, and Texas. This is the last time a governor of New York lost re-election. This would be the last gubernatorial race until 2022 that was decided by a single-digit margin.

== Ohio ==
1994 Ohio gubernatorial election
- November 8, 1994
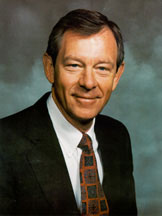

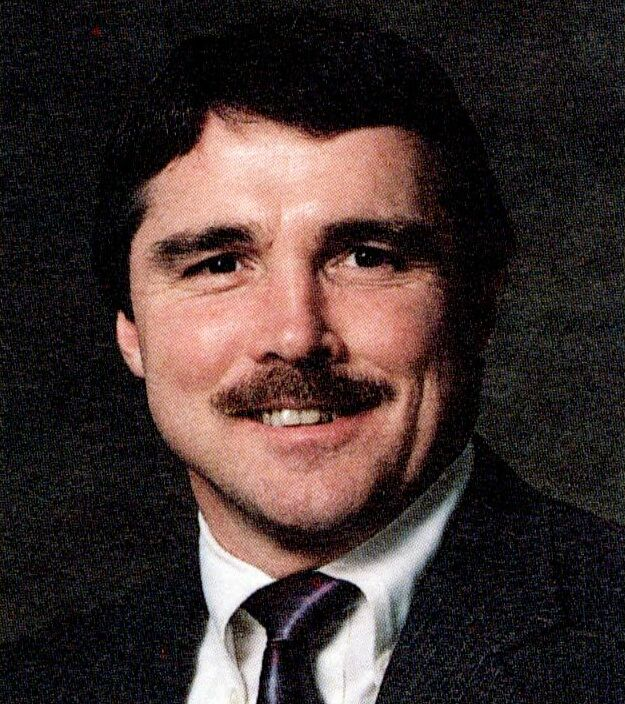
Nominee	George Voinovich	Rob Burch
Party	Republican	Democratic
Popular vote	2,401,572	835,849
Percentage	71.8%	25.0%
- Voinovich: 50–60% 60–70% 70–80% 80–90% >90% Burch: 50–60% 60–70% 70–80%
Governor before election
George Voinovich
Republican
Elected Governor
George Voinovich
Republican

The 1994 Ohio gubernatorial election took place on November 8, 1994. Incumbent Republican Governor of Ohio George Voinovich ran for re-election to a second and final term as governor. Voinovich won his party's nomination uncontested and was opposed by State Senator Rob Burch, who won a competitive Democratic primary. Ultimately, Voinovich capitalized on his massive popularity with Ohio and won re-election in an overwhelming landslide, defeating Burch and winning over 70% of the vote. As of 2024, this was the last time Athens County voted for the Republican candidate.

== Oklahoma ==
1994 Oklahoma gubernatorial election
- November 8, 1994
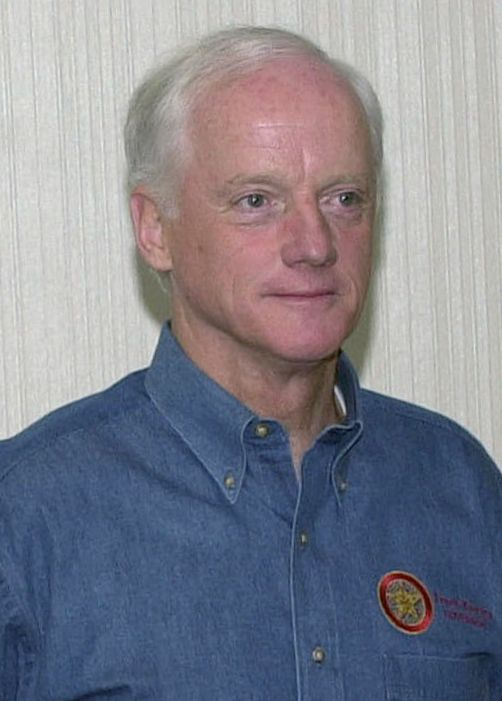

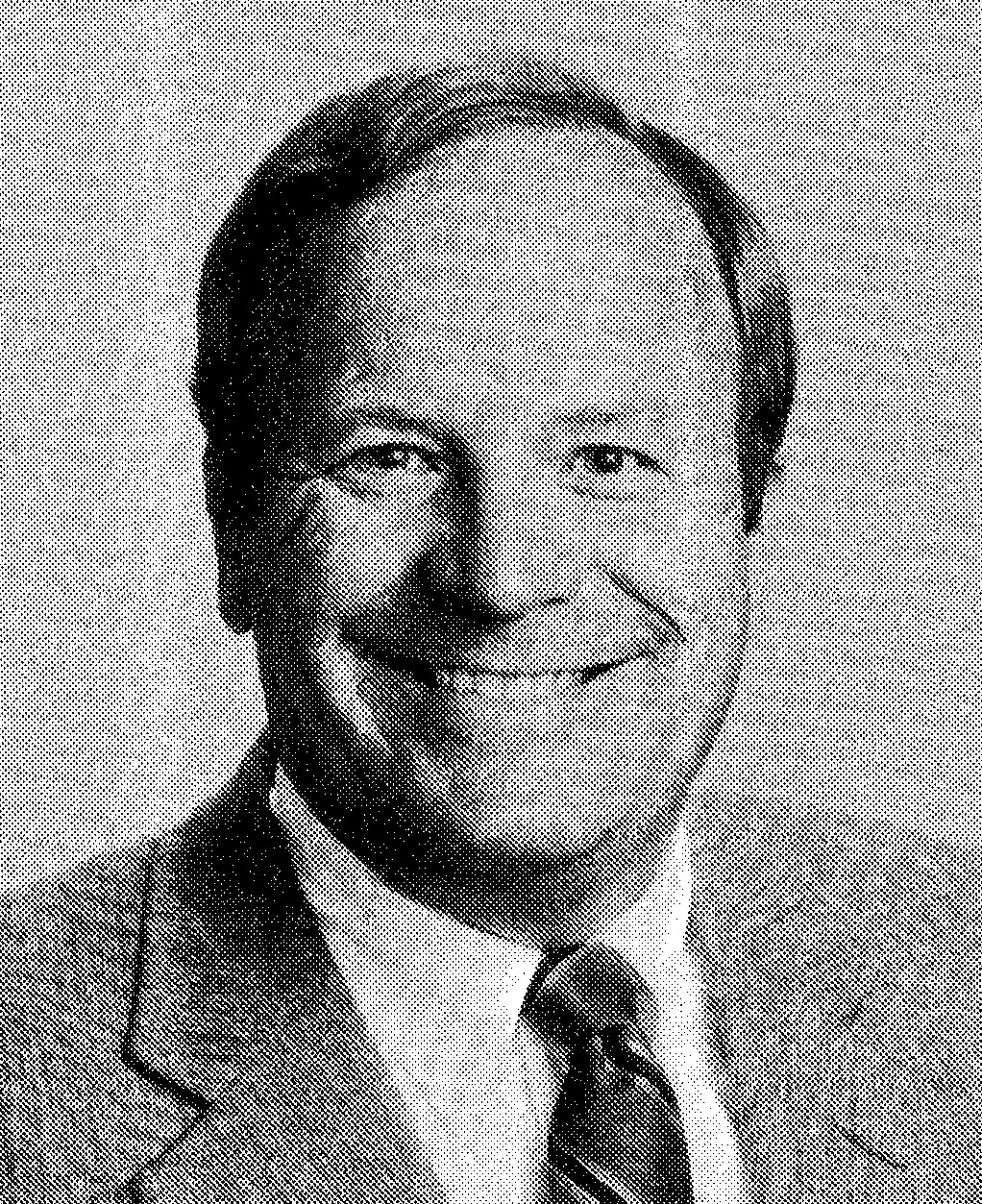

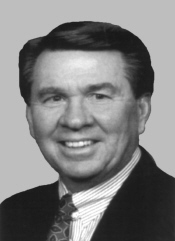
Nominee	Frank Keating	Jack Mildren	Wes Watkins
Party	Republican	Democratic	Independent
Popular vote	466,740	294,936	233,336
Percentage	46.9%	29.6%	23.5%
- County results Keating: 30–40% 40–50% 50–60% 60–70% Mildren: 30–40% 40–50% 50–60% Watkins: 30–40% 40–50% 50–60% 60–70%
Governor before election
David Walters
Democratic
Elected Governor
Frank Keating
Republican

The 1994 Oklahoma gubernatorial election was held on November 8, 1994, and was a race for Governor of Oklahoma. Former United States Associate Attorney General Frank Keating pulled an upset in the three-way race to become only the third Republican governor in Oklahoma history.

The Democratic vote was split between Lieutenant Governor Jack Mildren, an Oklahoma Sooners star quarterback from 1969 to 1971, and former Democratic congressman Wes Watkins, who ran as an independent. Watkins won 24% of the vote and carried numerous counties (by wide margins in some cases); his 233,000 votes far exceeded Keating's 171,000-vote winning margin over Mildren.

This was the first time since Oklahoma statehood that Jackson County, Stephens County, and Grady County voted Republican in a gubernatorial election, and the first time since 1914 that Comanche County voted Republican.

== Oregon ==
1994 Oregon gubernatorial election
- November 8, 1994
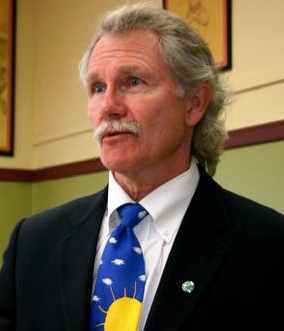

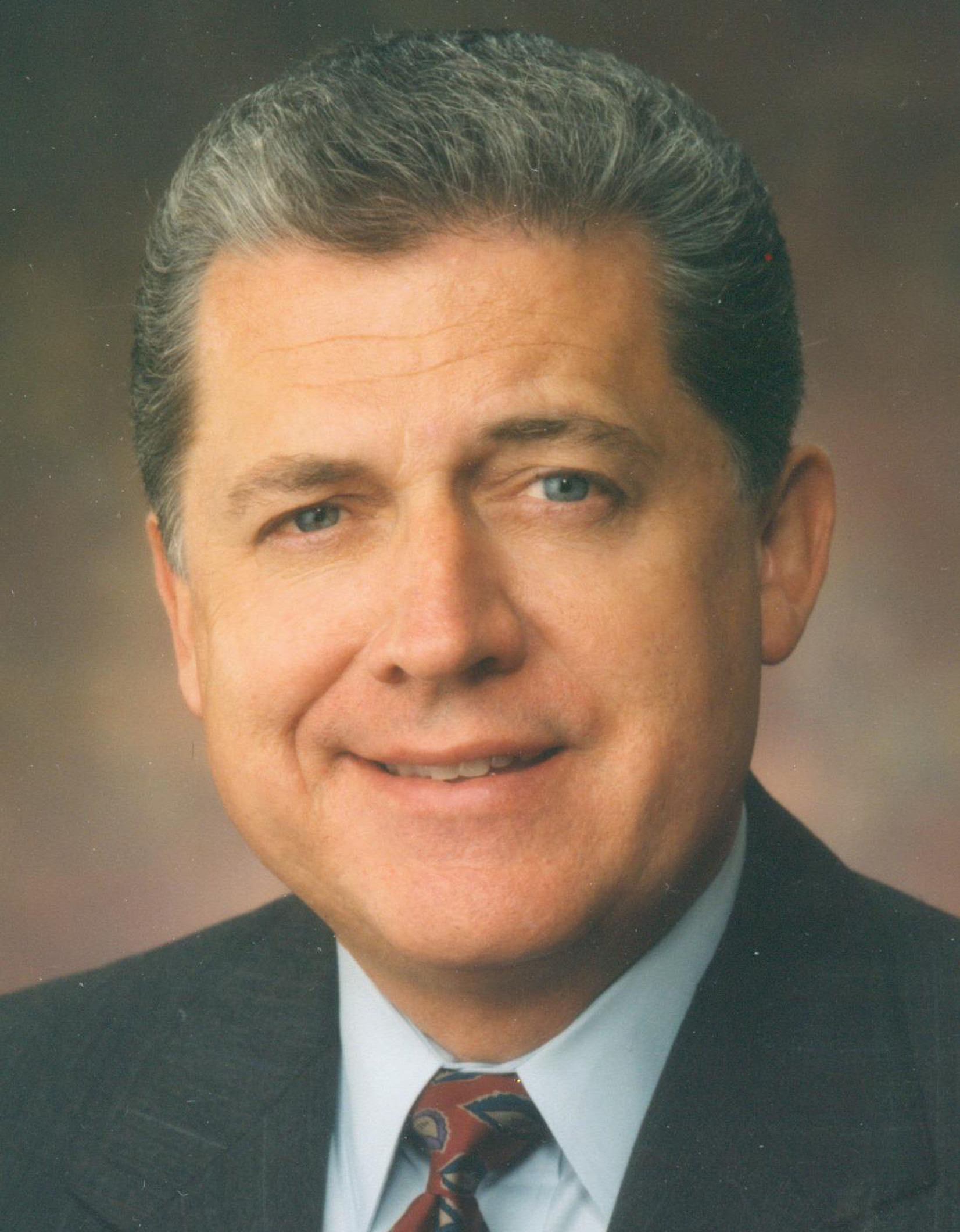
Nominee	John Kitzhaber	Denny Smith
Party	Democratic	Republican
Popular vote	622,083	517,874
Percentage	51.0%	42.4%
- County results Kitzhaber: 40–50% 50–60% 60–70% Smith: 40–50% 50–60% 60–70% 70–80%
Governor before election
Barbara Roberts
Democratic
Elected Governor
John Kitzhaber
Democratic

The 1994 Oregon gubernatorial election took place on November 3, 1994. Democratic nominee John Kitzhaber won the election, defeating Republican Denny Smith.

== Pennsylvania ==
1994 Pennsylvania gubernatorial election
- November 8, 1994
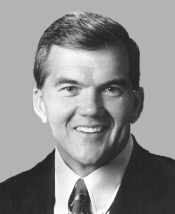

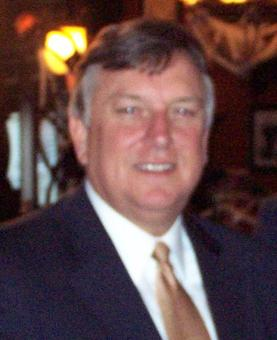

Nominee	Tom Ridge	Mark Singel	Peg Luksik
Party	Republican	Democratic	Constitution
Running mate	Mark Schweiker	Tom Foley	Jim Clymer
Popular vote	1,627,976	1,430,099	460,269
Percentage	45.4%	39.9%	12.8%
- Ridge: 30–40% 40–50% 50–60% 60–70% 70–80% 80–90% Singel: 30–40% 40–50% 50–60% 60–70% 70–80% 80–90% >90% Luksik: 30–40% 40–50% 50–60% Tie: 30–40% 40–50% 50–60% No data
Governor before election
Robert P. Casey
Democratic
Elected Governor
Tom Ridge
Republican

The 1994 Pennsylvania gubernatorial election was held on November 8, 1994. The incumbent governor, Bob Casey, Sr. (Democrat), was barred from seeking a third term by the state constitution. The Republican Party nominated Congressman Tom Ridge, while the Democrats nominated Mark Singel, Casey's lieutenant governor. Ridge went on to win the race with 45% of the vote. Singel finished with 39%, and Constitution Party candidate Peg Luksik finished third, garnering 12% of the vote.

== Rhode Island ==
1994 Rhode Island gubernatorial election
- November 8, 1994
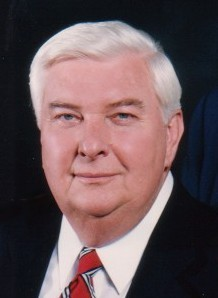

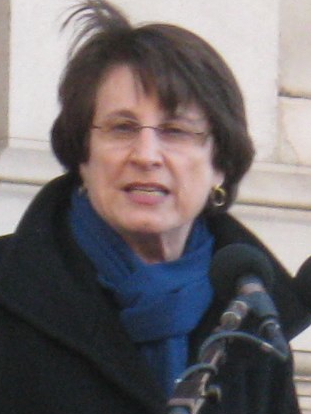

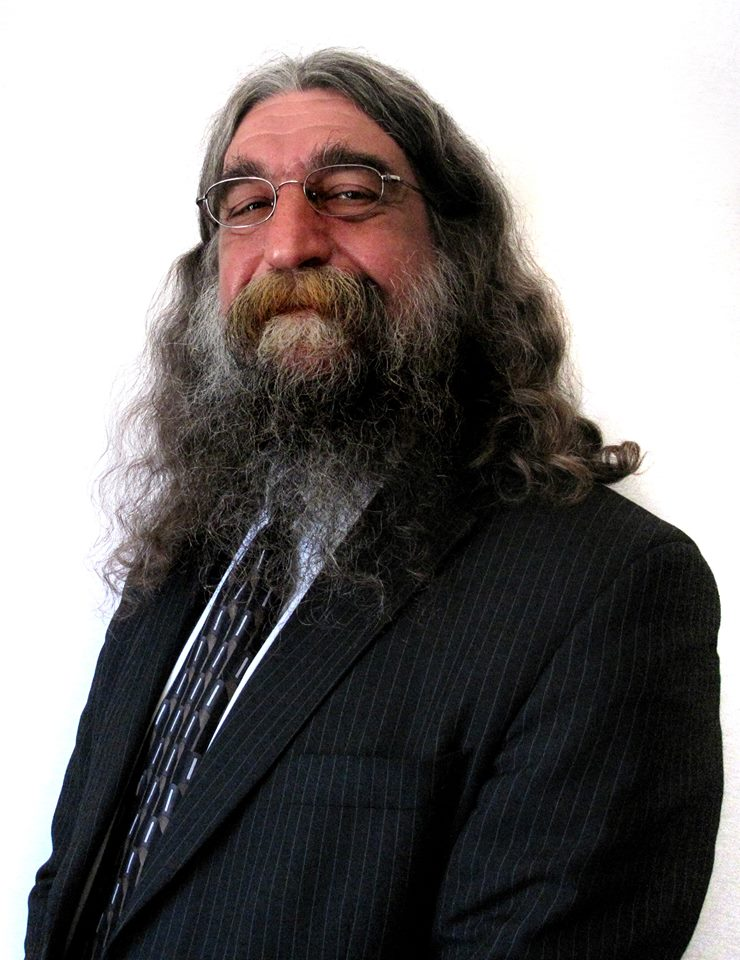
Nominee	Lincoln Almond	Myrth York	Robert J. Healey
Party	Republican	Democratic	Independent
Popular vote	171,194	157,361	32,822
Percentage	47.4%	43.5%	9.1%
- Almond: 40–50% 50–60% 60–70% York: 40–50% 50–60% Healey: 30–40%
Governor before election
Bruce Sundlun
Democratic
Elected Governor
Lincoln Almond
Republican

The 1994 Rhode Island gubernatorial election took place on November 8, 1994. Republican Lincoln Almond defeated Democrat Myrth York. Almond was the first governor elected to a four-year term, as opposed to two years.

== South Carolina ==
1994 South Carolina gubernatorial election
- November 8, 1994
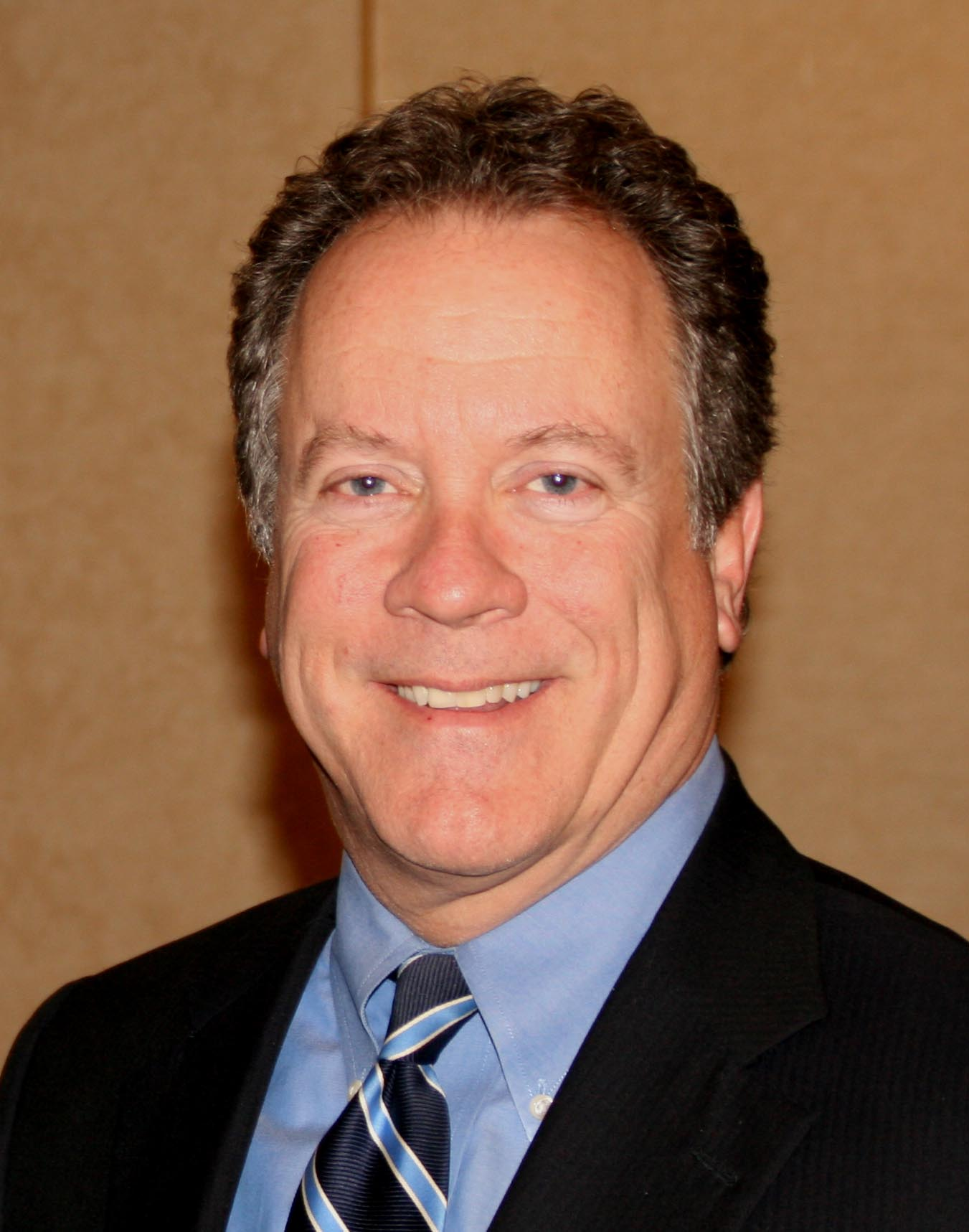

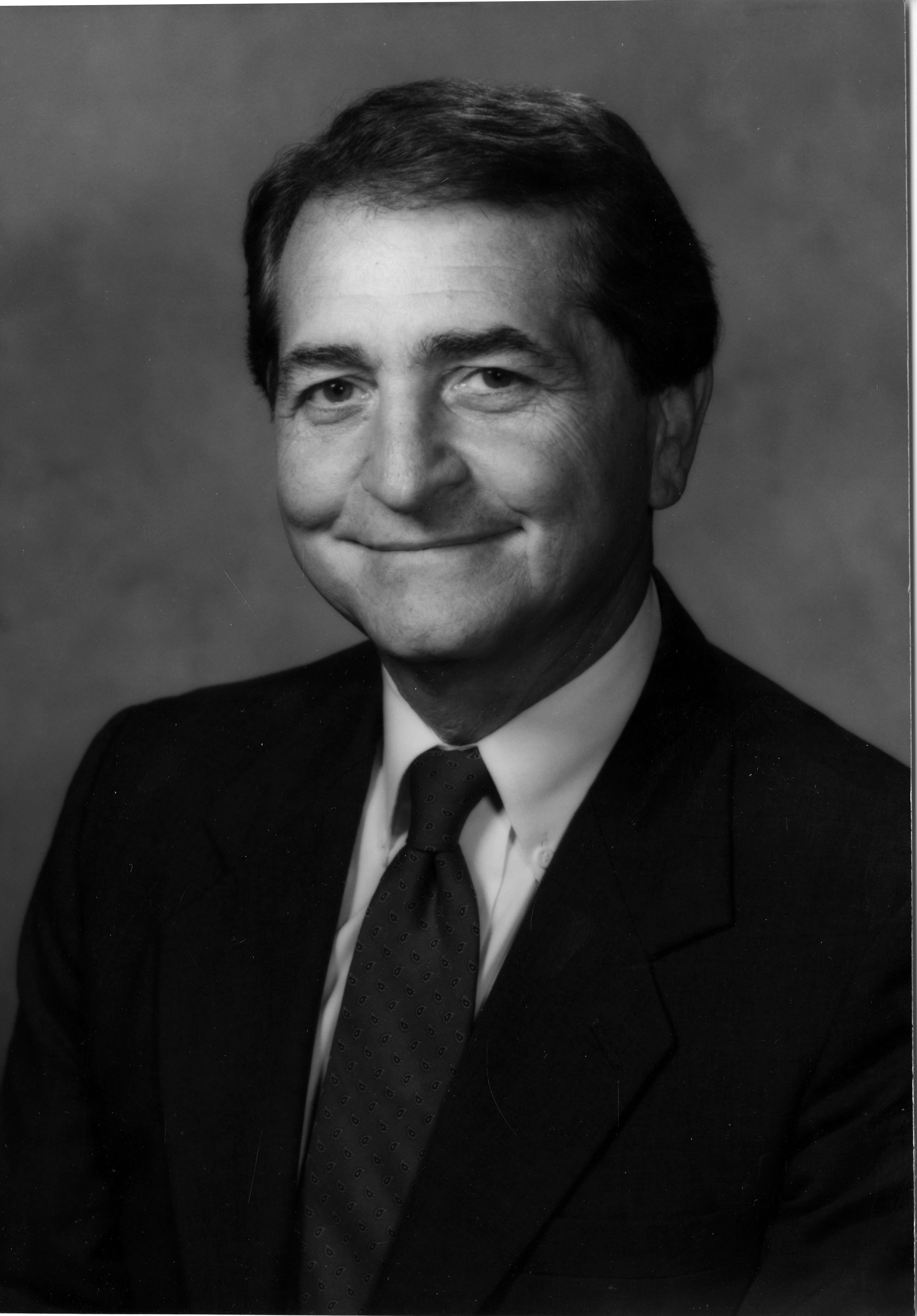
Nominee	David Beasley	Nick Theodore
Party	Republican	Democratic
Popular vote	470,756	447,002
Percentage	50.4%	47.9%
- County results Beasley: 40-50% 50-60% 60-70% Theodore: 40–50% 50–60% 60–70%
Governor before election
Carroll A. Campbell Jr.
Republican
Elected Governor
David Beasley
Republican

The 1994 South Carolina gubernatorial election was held on November 8, 1994, to select the governor of the state of South Carolina. The contest featured two politicians from the Upstate and David Beasley narrowly defeated Nick Theodore to become the 113th governor of South Carolina.

== South Dakota ==
1994 South Dakota gubernatorial election
- November 8, 1994
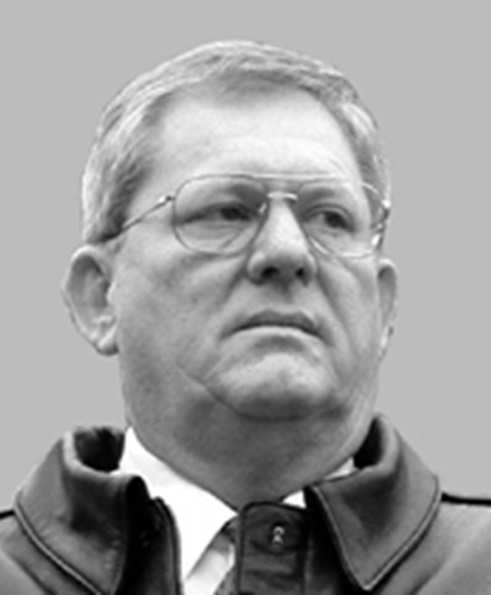

Nominee	Bill Janklow	Jim Beddow
Party	Republican	Democratic
Running mate	Carole Hillard	James W. Abbott
Popular vote	172,515	126,273
Percentage	55.4%	40.5%
- County results Janklow: 40–50% 50–60% 60–70% 70–80% Beddow: 50–60% 80–90%
Governor before election
Walter Dale Miller
Republican
Elected Governor
Bill Janklow
Republican

The 1994 South Dakota gubernatorial election, took place on November 8, 1994, to elect a Governor of South Dakota. Republican former Governor Bill Janklow was elected, defeating Democratic nominee Jim Beddow.

== Tennessee ==
1994 Tennessee gubernatorial election
- November 8, 1994
- Turnout: 56.62%
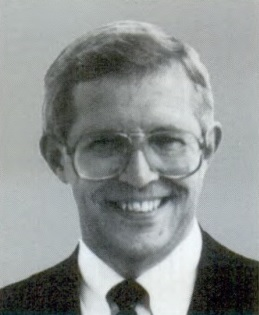

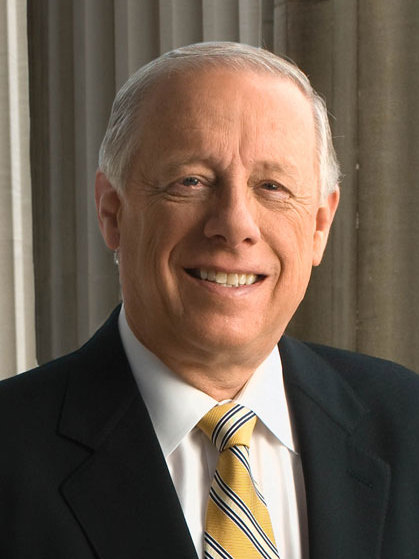
Nominee	Don Sundquist	Phil Bredesen
Party	Republican	Democratic
Popular vote	807,104	664,252
Percentage	54.27%	44.67%
- County results Sundquist: 40–50% 50–60% 60–70% 70–80% Bredesen: 40–50% 50–60% 60–70%
Governor before election
Ned McWherter
Democratic
Elected Governor
Don Sundquist
Republican

The 1994 Tennessee gubernatorial election took place on November 8, 1994, to elect the next governor of Tennessee. Incumbent Democratic governor Ned McWherter was term-limited, leaving the governorship an open seat. Republican congressman Don Sundquist was elected Governor of Tennessee, defeating Democratic nominee Phil Bredesen, the mayor of Nashville, who later won Tennessee's governorship in 2002 & 2006.

David Y. Copeland III unsuccessfully sought the Republican nomination, while Bill Morris and Steve Cohen unsuccessfully sought the Democratic nomination.

== Texas ==
1994 Texas gubernatorial election
- November 8, 1994
- Turnout: 50.87%
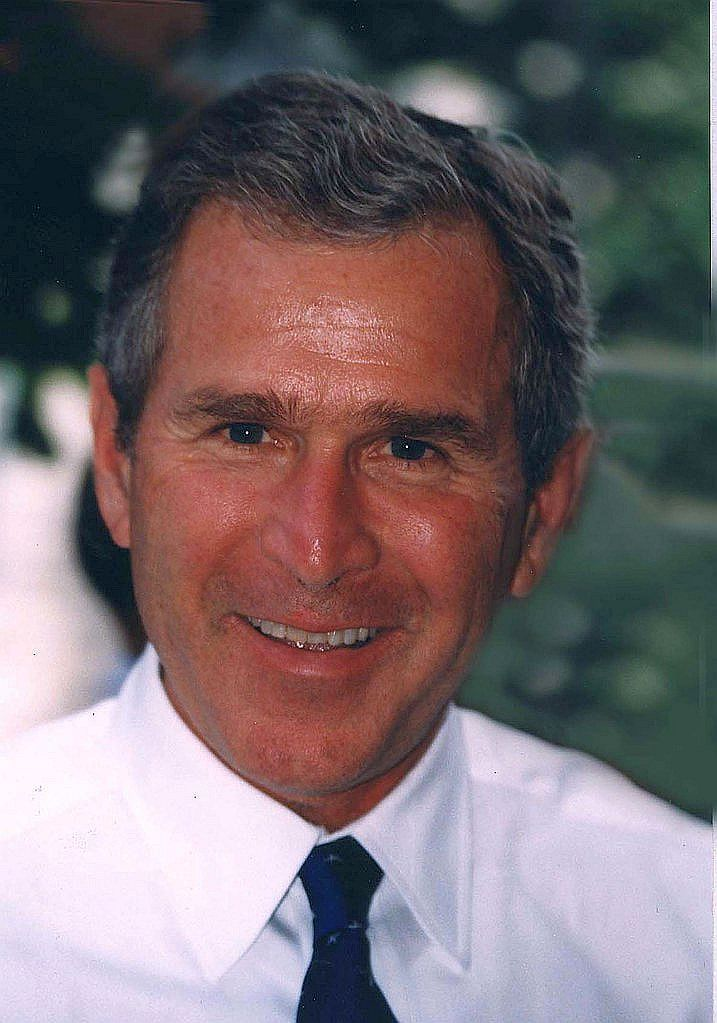

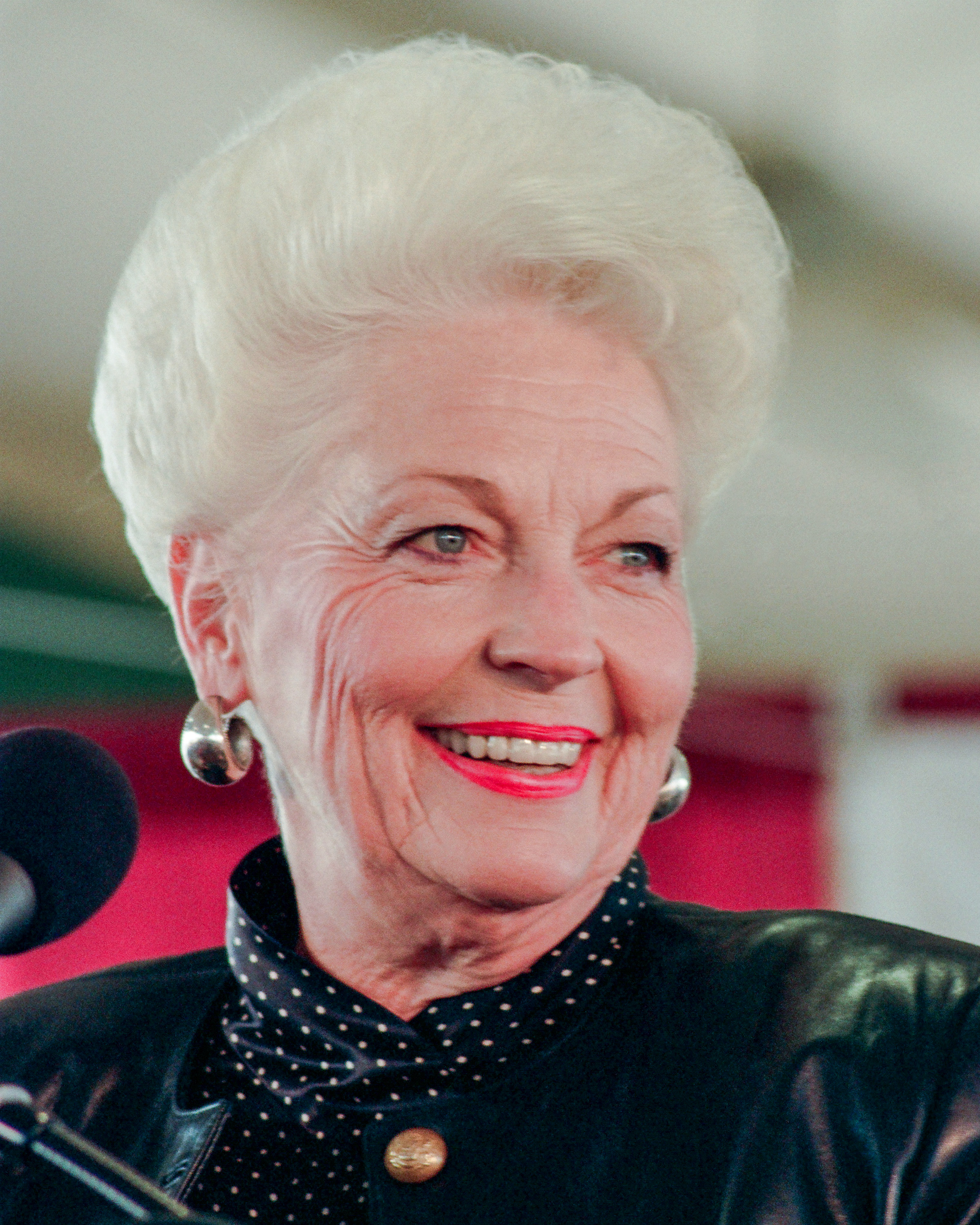
Nominee	George W. Bush	Ann Richards
Party	Republican	Democratic
Popular vote	2,350,994	2,016,928
Percentage	53.5%	45.9%
- County results Bush: 40–50% 50–60% 60–70% 70–80% 80–90% Richards: 40–50% 50–60% 60–70% 70–80% 80–90%
Governor before election
Ann Richards
Democratic
Elected Governor
George W. Bush
Republican

The 1994 Texas gubernatorial election was held on November 8, 1994, to elect the governor of Texas. Incumbent Democratic governor Ann Richards was defeated in her bid for re-election by Republican nominee and future president George W. Bush, the son of former president George H. W. Bush.

Before the election, Richards had a high approval rating due to the strength of the state economy. However, Bush's campaigning on cultural and religious issues resonated with many Texan voters, and the race was considered a tossup on election day.

== Vermont ==
1994 Vermont gubernatorial election
- November 8, 1994
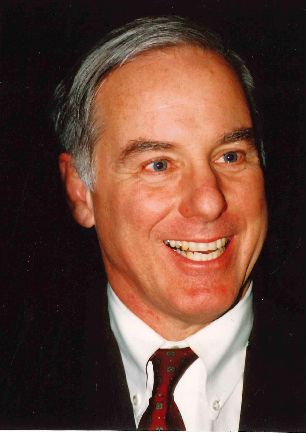

Nominee	Howard Dean	David F. Kelley	Thomas J. Morse
Party	Democratic	Republican	Independent
Popular vote	145,661	40,292	15,000
Percentage	68.7%	19.0%	7.1%
- Dean: 30-40% 40-50% 50-60% 60-70% 70-80% 80-90% Kelley: 40-50% 50-60%
Governor before election
Howard Dean
Democratic
Elected Governor
Howard Dean
Democratic

The 1994 Vermont gubernatorial election took place on November 7, 1994. Incumbent Governor Howard Dean won re-election.

== Wisconsin ==
1994 Wisconsin gubernatorial election
- November 8, 1994
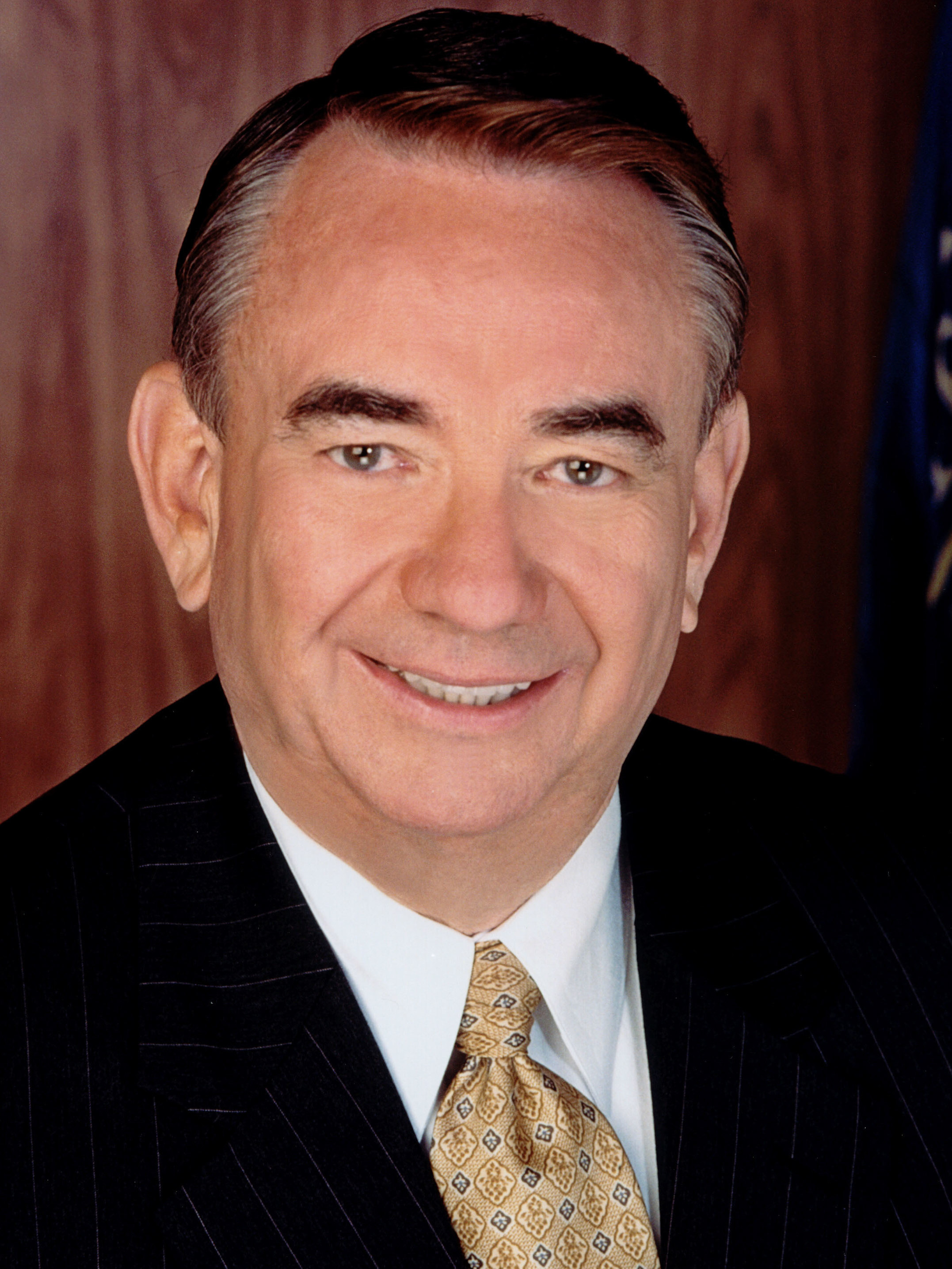

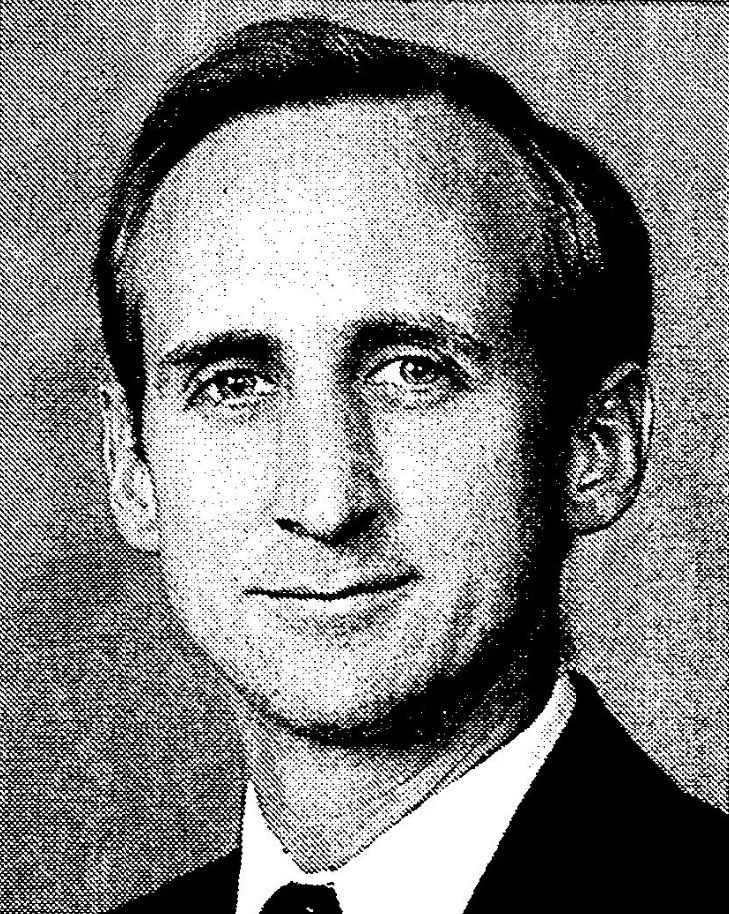
Nominee	Tommy Thompson	Charles Chvala
Party	Republican	Democratic
Running mate	Scott McCallum	Dorothy K. Dean
Popular vote	1,051,326	482,850
Percentage	67.23%	30.88%
- Thompson: 40–50% 50–60% 60–70% 70–80% 80–90% >90% Chvala: 40–50% 50–60% 60–70% 70–80% 80–90% >90% Tie
Governor before election
Tommy G. Thompson
Republican
Elected Governor
Tommy G. Thompson
Republican

The 1994 Wisconsin gubernatorial election was held on November 8, 1994. In the midst of the Republican Revolution, incumbent Republican governor Tommy Thompson won the election with a landslide 67% of the vote, winning a third term as Governor of Wisconsin.

Thompson's share of the popular vote was the highest received by any gubernatorial candidate in Wisconsin since 1920. Thompson also won 71 of Wisconsin's 72 counties, losing only Menominee County by 20 votes. This is the most recent gubernatorial election in which Dane County (containing Wisconsin's capital of Madison), as well as Ashland, Bayfield, and Douglas counties, have voted for the Republican candidate.

== Wyoming ==
1994 Wyoming gubernatorial election
- November 8, 1994
- Turnout: 84.51% Registered ▲4.52% 44.31% of Total Population ▲9.01%
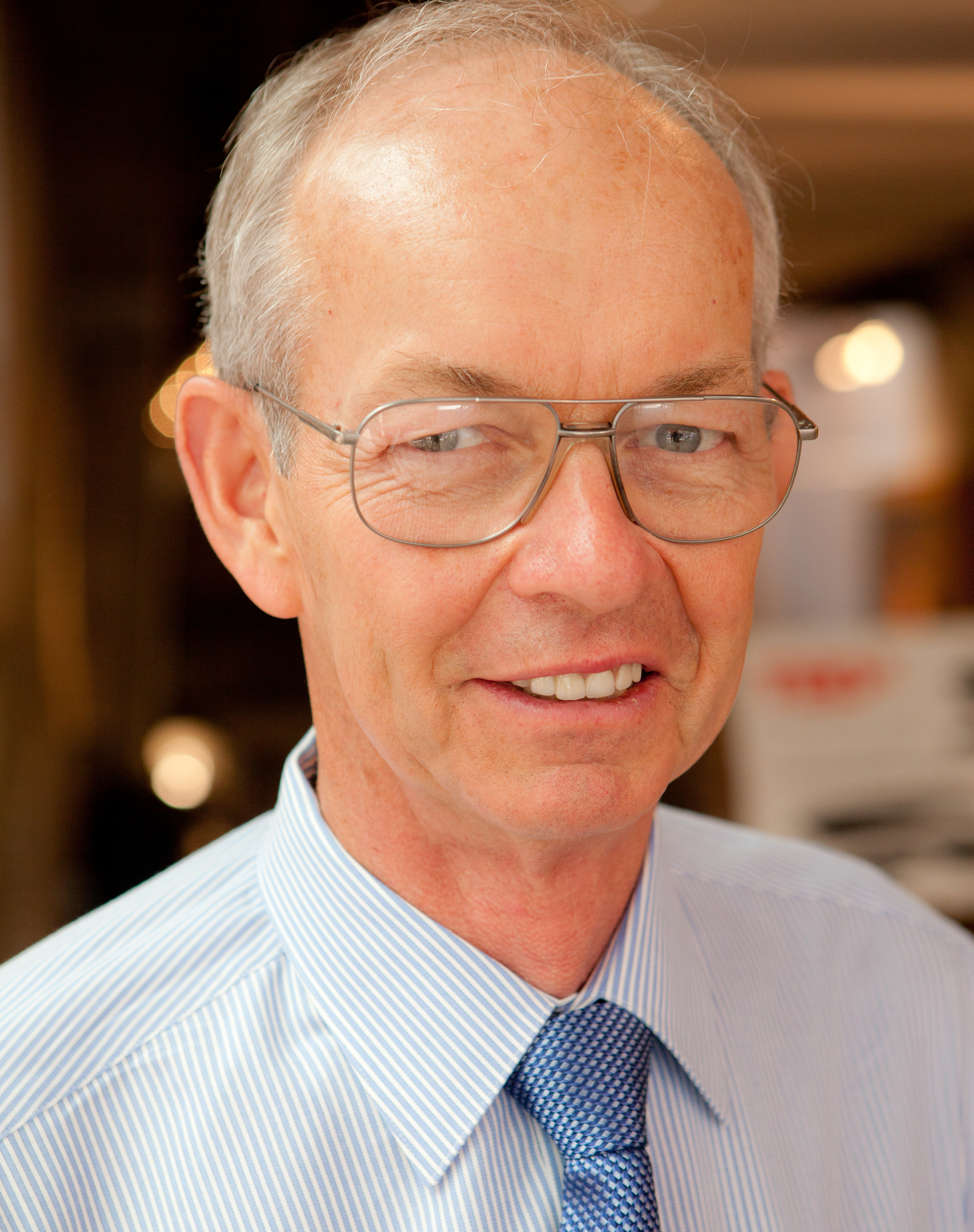

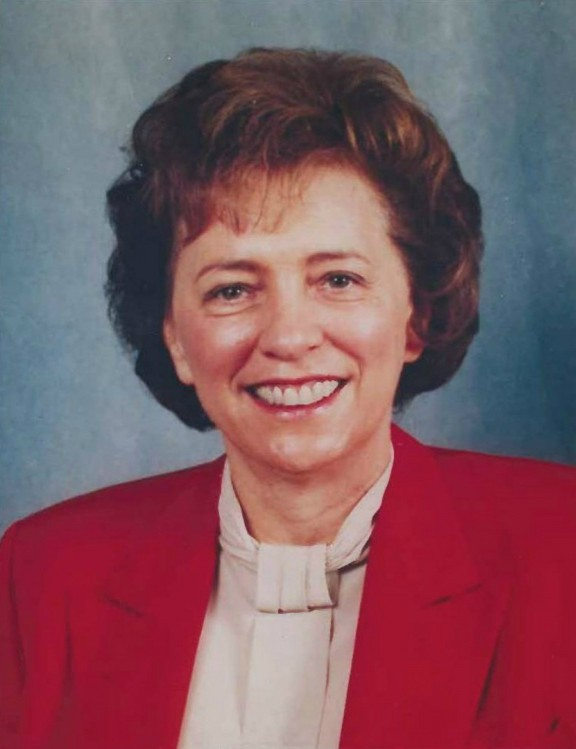
Nominee	Jim Geringer	Kathy Karpan
Party	Republican	Democratic
Popular vote	118,016	80,747
Percentage	58.72%	40.17%
- County results Geringer: 40–50% 50–60% 60–70% 70–80% Karpan: 50–60%
Governor before election
Mike Sullivan
Democratic
Elected Governor
Jim Geringer
Republican

The 1994 Wyoming gubernatorial election took place on November 8, 1994. Incumbent Democratic Governor Mike Sullivan was unable to seek a third term because of newly imposed term limits, and instead ran for the U.S. Senate. State Senate President Jim Geringer won the Republican primary and faced Secretary of State Kathy Karpan, the Democratic nominee, in the general election. Aided by the nationwide Republican wave, Geringer defeated Karpan in a landslide, marking the first time since Governor Stanley Hathaway's re-election in 1970 that a Republican won a gubernatorial election in Wyoming.

== Territories and federal district ==
=== District of Columbia ===
1994 United States gubernatorial elections
- November 8, 1994
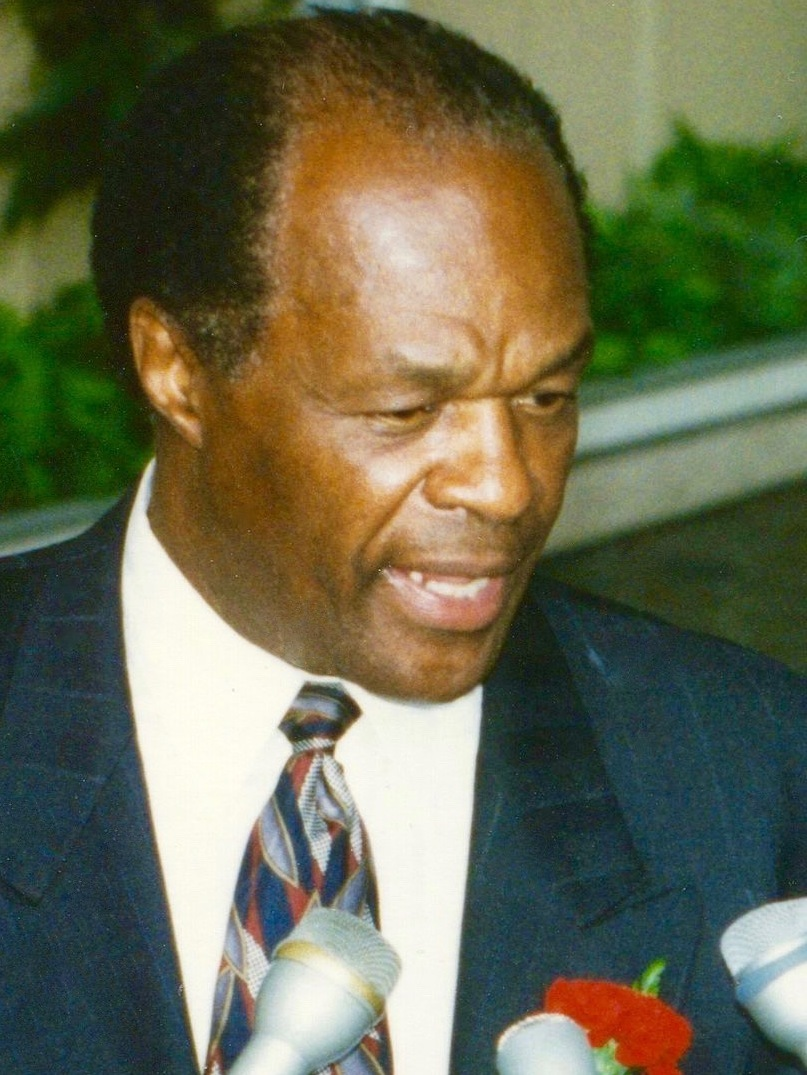

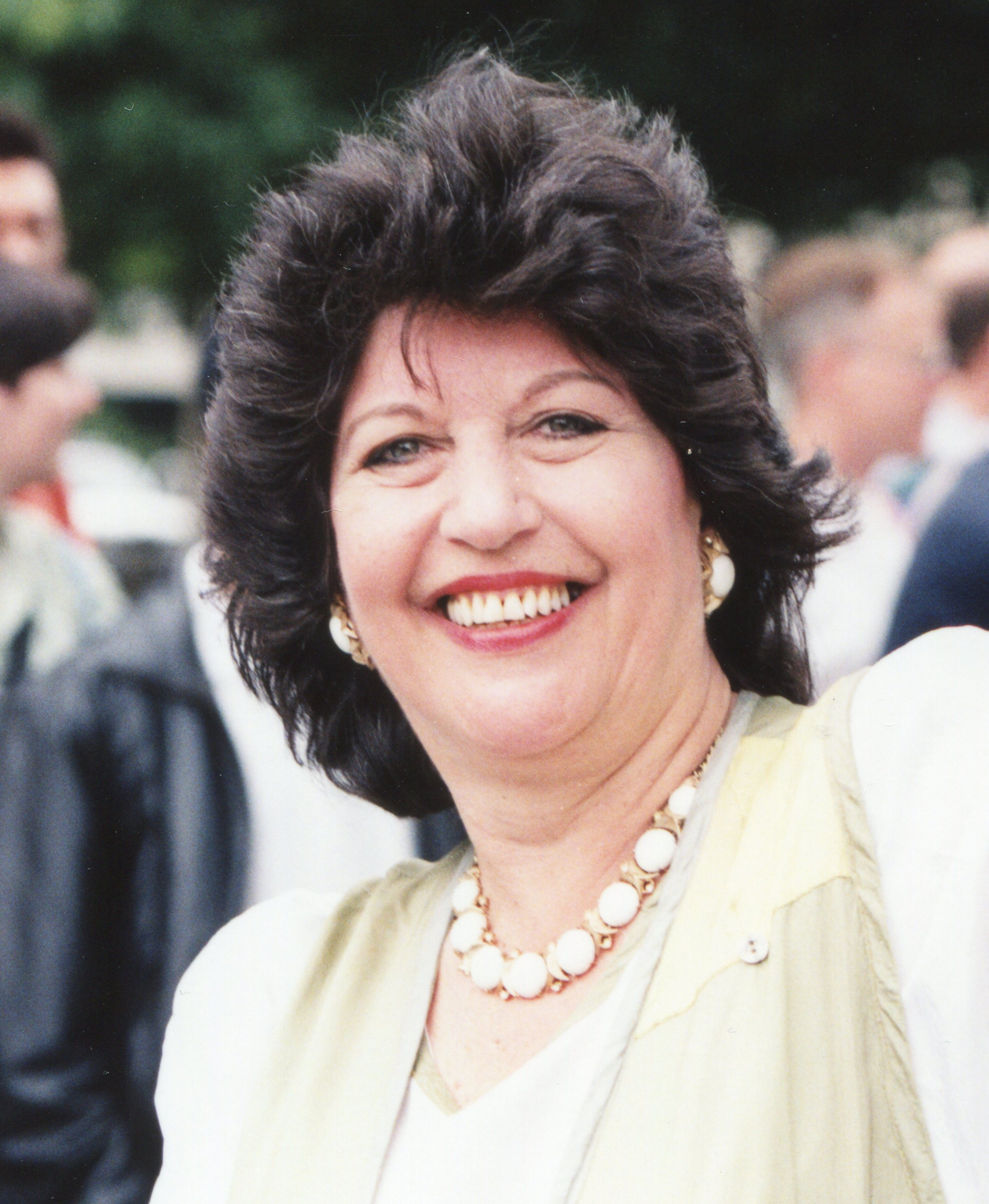
Nominee	Marion Barry	Carol Schwartz
Party	Democratic	Republican
Popular vote	102,884	76,902
Percentage	56.02%	41.87%
- Results by ward Barry: 60–70% 70–80% 80–90% >90% Schwartz: 40–50% 60–70% >90%
Mayor before election
Sharon Pratt Kelly
Democratic
Elected mayor
Marion Barry
Democratic

On November 8, 1994, Washington, D.C., held an election for its mayor. It featured the return of Marion Barry, who served as mayor from 1979 until 1991.

Barry served six months in prison on a cocaine conviction. After his release from prison, Barry ran successfully for the Ward 8 city council seat in 1992, running under the slogan "He May Not Be Perfect, But He's Perfect for D.C." Upon this victory, Barry said he was "not interested in being mayor" again.

This was by far the smallest Democratic victory margin in a regularly scheduled partisan citywide election since the city was granted home rule.

=== Guam ===
1994 Guam gubernatorial election
- 8 November 1994
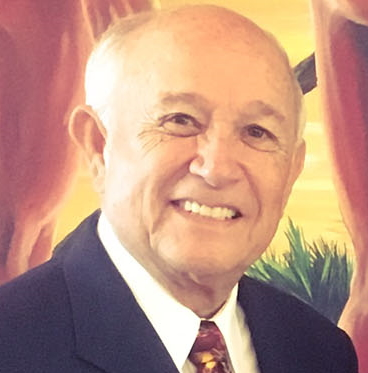

Nominee	Carl Gutierrez	Francisco Blas Aguon, Sr.
Party	Democratic	Republican
Popular vote	23,405	19,281
Percentage	54.83%	45.17%
Governor before election
Joseph Franklin Ada
Republican
Elected Governor
Carl Gutierrez
Democratic

The 1994 Guam gubernatorial election was held on 8 November 1994, in order to elect the Governor of Guam. Democratic nominee and incumbent member of the Guam Legislature Carl Gutierrez defeated Republican nominee Francisco Blas Aguon Sr.

=== U.S. Virgin Islands ===
1994 United States Virgin Islands gubernatorial election
- November 8, 1994 (general); November 22, 1994 (runoff)
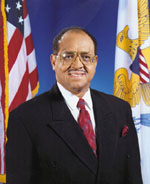
Nominee	Roy L. Schneider	Derek M. Hodge
Party	Independent	Democratic
Running mate	Kenneth Mapp	Alfred O. Heath
Popular vote	17,428	13,027
Percentage	57.23%	42.77%
Governor before election
Alexander A. Farrelly
Democratic
Elected Governor
Roy L. Schneider
Independent

General elections were held in the United States Virgin Islands on November 8, 1994, to elect a new governor and lieutenant governor, 15 members of the Legislature of the Virgin Islands and the Delegate to the United States House of Representatives.

== See also ==
- 1994 United States elections
  - 1994 United States Senate elections
  - 1994 United States House of Representatives elections
