= 1972 United States Senate election in New Mexico =

- November 7, 1972
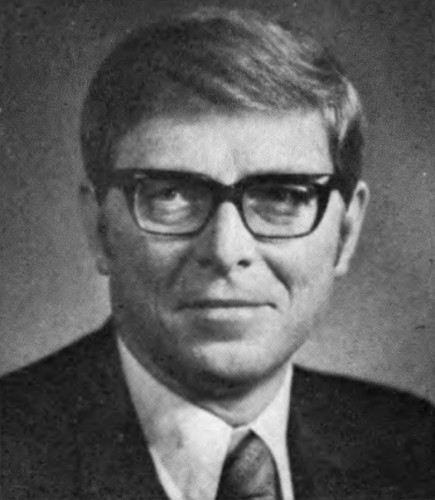

Nominee	Pete Domenici	Jack Daniels
Party	Republican	Democratic
Popular vote	204,253	173,815
Percentage	54.03%	45.97%
- County results Domenici: 50–60% 60–70% Daniels: 50–60% 60–70%
U.S. senator before election
Clinton Anderson
Democratic
Elected U.S. Senator
Pete Domenici
Republican

The 1972 United States Senate election in New Mexico took place on November 7, 1972. Incumbent Democratic U.S. Senator Clinton Presba Anderson did not run for re-election. Republican Pete Domenici defeated Democrat Jack Daniels to win the open seat.

== Democratic primary ==
=== Candidates ===
- Jack Daniels, former New Mexico state representative
- Roberto Mondragón, incumbent lieutenant governor of New Mexico
- Thomas G. Morris, former U.S. representative
- David L. Norvell, incumbent attorney general of New Mexico

=== Results ===
Democratic primary results
Party	Candidate	Votes	%
Democratic	Jack Daniels	45,648	29.75%
Democratic	Roberto Mondragón	29,603	19.29%
Democratic	David L. Norvell	24,917	16.24%
Democratic	Thomas G. Morris	22,849	14.89%
Democratic	Others	30,448	19.84%
Majority		16,045	10.46%
Total votes		153,465	100.00%

== Republican primary ==
=== Candidates ===
- David Cargo, former governor of New Mexico
- Pete Domenici, former mayor of Albuquerque and nominee for governor in 1970

=== Results ===
Republican primary results
Party	Candidate	Votes	%
Republican	Pete Domenici	37,337	63.25%
Republican	David Cargo	12,522	21.21%
Republican	Others	9,171	15.54%
Majority		24,815	42.04%
Total votes		59,030	100.00%

== General election ==
=== Results ===
General election results
Party	Candidate	Votes	%
Republican	Pete Domenici	204,253	54.03%
Democratic	Jack Daniels	173,815	45.97%
Majority		30,438	8.05%
Total votes		378,068	100.00%
Republican gain from Democratic			
