= Gloria Tristani =

American attorney and politician

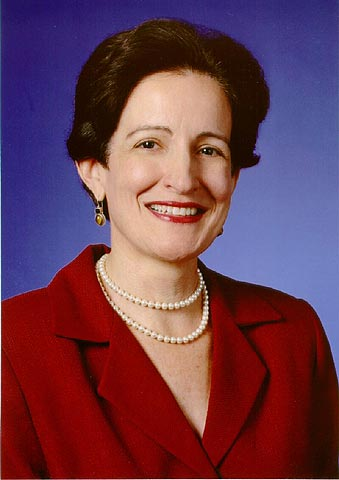

Member of the Federal Communications Commission
- In office November 3, 1997 – September 7, 2001
- President: Bill Clinton; George W. Bush

Personal details
- Born: December 20, 1953 (age 72) San Juan, Puerto Rico
- Party: Democratic
- Spouse: Gerard W. Thomson (died 2015)
- Relations: Dennis Chávez (grandfather); David Chávez (great-uncle)
- Children: 2
- Education: Barnard College (BA); University of New Mexico (JD)

Gloria Tristani (born December 20, 1953) is an American attorney and politician. Tristani served as a member of the Federal Communications Commission (FCC) from 1997 to 2001. In 2002, Tristiani unsuccessfully ran for Senate in New Mexico as a Democrat, losing to Republican incumbent Pete Domenici.

== Early life and education ==
Of Mexican, Cuban, and Puerto Rican descent, Tristani was born and raised in San Juan, Puerto Rico. She is the granddaughter of Dennis Chávez, who served as a member of the United States House of Representatives and United States Senate. Her great-uncle, David Chávez, served as a judge and the 34th mayor of Santa Fe.

Tristani earned a Bachelor of Arts degree from Barnard College and a Juris Doctor at the University of New Mexico School of Law.

== Early career ==
Tristani worked as an attorney in Albuquerque and is admitted to the bar in New Mexico and Colorado. In 1994, she was elected to New Mexico's State Corporation Commission (SCC) and served as its chair until 1996.

While on New Mexico's SCC, she advocated on behalf of consumers rights regarding health insurance and telecommunications, helping draft rules regulating managed care and HMOs and helping draft the New Mexico Mothers and Newly Born Children Rule.

== Federal Communications Commission (FCC) ==
Tristani was appointed by President Bill Clinton to the Federal Communications Commission on September 15, 1997. While serving on the FCC, she pushed for broadband deployment to remote areas, served as the chair of the FCC's V-Chip Task Force, fought children's exposure to violence and indecency and supported the so-called E-rate for libraries and schools.

== Post-FCC career ==
Tristani resigned from the FCC on September 7, 2001 to run for the United States Senate from New Mexico. She won the 2002 Democratic primary, but was defeated in the general election by incumbent Republican Pete Domenici, and subsequently returned to private practice.

Tristani was mentioned as a possible candidate in the 2006 Senate election in the event of a retirement by Democrat Jeff Bingaman, but Bingaman ultimately ran for reelection.

She later worked as of counsel to Spiegel & McDiarmid LLP, a law firm based in Washington, D.C. From 2017 to 2019, Tristani was a senior policy advisor to the National Hispanic Media Coalition.

== Personal life and recognition ==
She was married to the late Judge Gerard W. Thomson and has two children. In 2000, the National Association of Latino Elected Officials (NALEO) awarded her the Edward R. Roybal Award for Outstanding Public Service and was selected as Hispanic Business magazine's as one of the nation's 100 most influential Hispanics for the years 1996 and 1998.

== Sources ==
Party political offices
Preceded by Art Trujillo	Democratic nominee for U.S. Senator from New Mexico (Class 2); 2002	Succeeded by Tom Udall
