= Tom Benavidez =

American politician

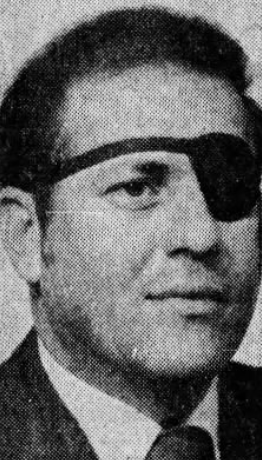
- Benavidez in 1974

Member of the New Mexico Senate
- In office 1966–1970
- In office 1984–1996

Personal details
- Born: Thomas Rey Benavidez; January 6, 1939 Albuquerque, New Mexico, U.S.
- Died: April 16, 2016 (aged 77) Albuquerque, New Mexico, U.S.
- Party: Democratic; Republican; Reform Party (2000)
- Education: University of Albuquerque

Thomas Rey Benavidez (January 6, 1939 – April 16, 2016) was an American politician. A member of the Democratic Party, the Republican Party and the Reform Party, he served in the New Mexico Senate from 1966 to 1970 and again from 1984 to 1996.

== Life and career ==
Benavidez was born in Albuquerque, New Mexico, the son of John Sanchez Benavidez and Neph Pino. He attended and graduated from Albuquerque High School. After graduating, he attended the University of Albuquerque, earning his degree in accounting and economics, which after earning his degree, he worked as a real estate broker.

Benavidez served in the New Mexico Senate from 1966 to 1970 and again from 1984 to 1996. During his service in the Senate, in 1990, he ran as a Democratic candidate for United States senator of New Mexico. He received 110,033 votes, but lost to Republican incumbent Pete Domenici, who won with 296,712 votes.

In 2002, Benavidez ran as a Republican candidate for auditor of New Mexico. He received 218,747 votes, but lost to Democratic incumbent Domingo Martinez, who won with 238,507 votes.

== Death ==
Benavidez died on April 16, 2016, in Albuquerque, New Mexico, at the age of 77.
