= 1982 New Mexico gubernatorial election =

- November 2, 1982
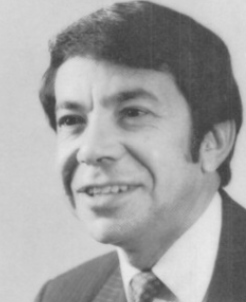

Nominee	Toney Anaya	John B. Irick
Party	Democratic	Republican
Popular vote	215,840	191,626
Percentage	52.97%	47.03%
- County results Anaya: 50–60% 60–70% 70–80% Irick: 50–60% 60–70%
Governor before election
Bruce King
Democratic
Elected Governor
Toney Anaya
Democratic

The 1982 New Mexico gubernatorial election took place on November 2, 1982 to elect the governor of New Mexico. Due to term limits, incumbent Democrat Bruce King was ineligible to seek a second consecutive (and third overall) term as governor. Democrat Toney Anaya defeated Republican state senator John B. Irick by about five points. Anaya was the first Democrat to carry Harding County in a gubernatorial election since Thomas J. Mabry in 1946.

This was the last election in which a governor of New Mexico was succeeded by a member of the same party until 2026.

== Primary election ==
=== Democratic primary ===
The Democratic primary was won by former attorney general Toney Anaya.

==== Results ====
New Mexico Democratic gubernatorial primary, 1982
Party	Candidate	Votes	%
Democratic	Toney Anaya	101,077	56.95%
Democratic	Aubrey Dunn, Sr.	60,866	34.29%
Democratic	Fabian Chavez Jr.	11,874	6.69%
Democratic	Les Houston	3,673	2.07%
Total votes		177,490	100.00%

=== Republican primary ===
The Republican primary was won by state senator John B. Irick.

==== Results ====
New Mexico Republican gubernatorial primary, 1982
Party	Candidate	Votes	%
Republican	John B. Irick	35,789	54.56%
Republican	William A. Sego	27,220	41.50%
Republican	James A. Caudell	2,590	3.95%
Total votes		65,599	100.00%

== General election ==
=== Results ===
1982 New Mexico gubernatorial election
Party	Candidate	Votes	%	±%
Democratic	Toney Anaya	215,840	52.97%	+2.42%
Republican	John B. Irick	191,626	47.03%	−2.42%
Majority		24,214	5.94%	
Total votes		407,466	100.00%	
Democratic hold		Swing	+4.85%	

=== Results by county ===
County	Toney Anaya Democratic		John B. Irick Republican		Margin		Total votes cast
County	#	%	#	%	#	%	Total votes cast
Bernalillo	72,539	52.61%	65,336	47.39%	7,203	5.22%	137,875
Catron	579	45.81%	685	54.19%	-106	-8.39%	1,264
Chaves	6,074	36.35%	10,636	63.65%	4,562	27.30%	16,710
Cibola	3,665	58.34%	2,617	41.66%	1,048	16.68%	6,282
Colfax	2,655	58.01%	1,922	41.99%	733	16.01%	4,577
Curry	3,408	34.75%	6,399	65.25%	-2,991	-30.50%	9,807
De Baca	472	45.34%	569	54.66%	-97	-9.32%	1,041
Doña Ana	12,051	47.47%	13,337	52.53%	-1,286	-5.07%	25,388
Eddy	7,798	48.69%	8,218	51.31%	-420	-2.62%	16,016
Grant	5,612	59.57%	3,809	40.43%	1,803	19.14%	9,421
Guadalupe	1,647	76.21%	514	23.79%	1,133	52.43%	2,161
Harding	328	53.33%	287	46.67%	41	6.67%	615
Hidalgo	959	53.52%	833	46.48%	126	7.03%	1,792
Lea	4,548	36.16%	8,031	63.84%	-3,483	-27.69%	12,579
Lincoln	1,368	34.41%	2,608	65.59%	-1,240	-31.19%	3,976
Los Alamos	3,542	43.11%	4,674	56.89%	-1,132	-13.78%	8,216
Luna	2,558	44.74%	3,159	55.26%	-601	-10.51%	5,717
McKinley	6,911	63.15%	4,033	36.85%	2,878	26.30%	10,944
Mora	1,580	69.85%	682	30.15%	898	39.70%	2,262
Otero	4,186	39.18%	6,497	60.82%	-2,311	-21.63%	10,683
Quay	1,572	43.97%	2,003	56.03%	-431	-12.06%	3,575
Rio Arriba	8,145	79.97%	2,040	20.03%	6,105	59.94%	10,185
Roosevelt	1,596	32.34%	3,339	67.66%	-1,743	-35.32%	4,935
San Juan	9,225	45.41%	11,092	54.59%	-1,867	-9.19%	20,317
San Miguel	5,439	77.40%	1,588	22.60%	3,851	54.80%	7,027
Sandoval	7,139	59.57%	4,846	40.43%	2,293	19.13%	11,985
Santa Fe	19,737	68.80%	8,952	31.20%	10,785	37.59%	28,689
Sierra	1,550	44.64%	1,922	55.36%	-372	-10.71%	3,472
Socorro	2,969	58.36%	2,118	41.64%	851	16.73%	5,087
Taos	6,121	77.26%	1,802	22.74%	4,319	54.51%	7,923
Torrance	1,881	56.78%	1,432	43.22%	449	13.55%	3,313
Union	766	39.63%	1,167	60.37%	-401	-20.74%	1,933
Valencia	7,220	61.71%	4,479	38.29%	2,741	23.43%	11,699
Total	215,840	52.97%	191,626	47.03%	24,214	5.94%	407,466

==== Counties that flipped from Republican to Democratic ====
- Bernalillo
- Harding

==== Counties that flipped from Democratic to Republican ====
- De Baca
- Eddy
