= 1990 United States Senate election in New Mexico =

- November 6, 1990
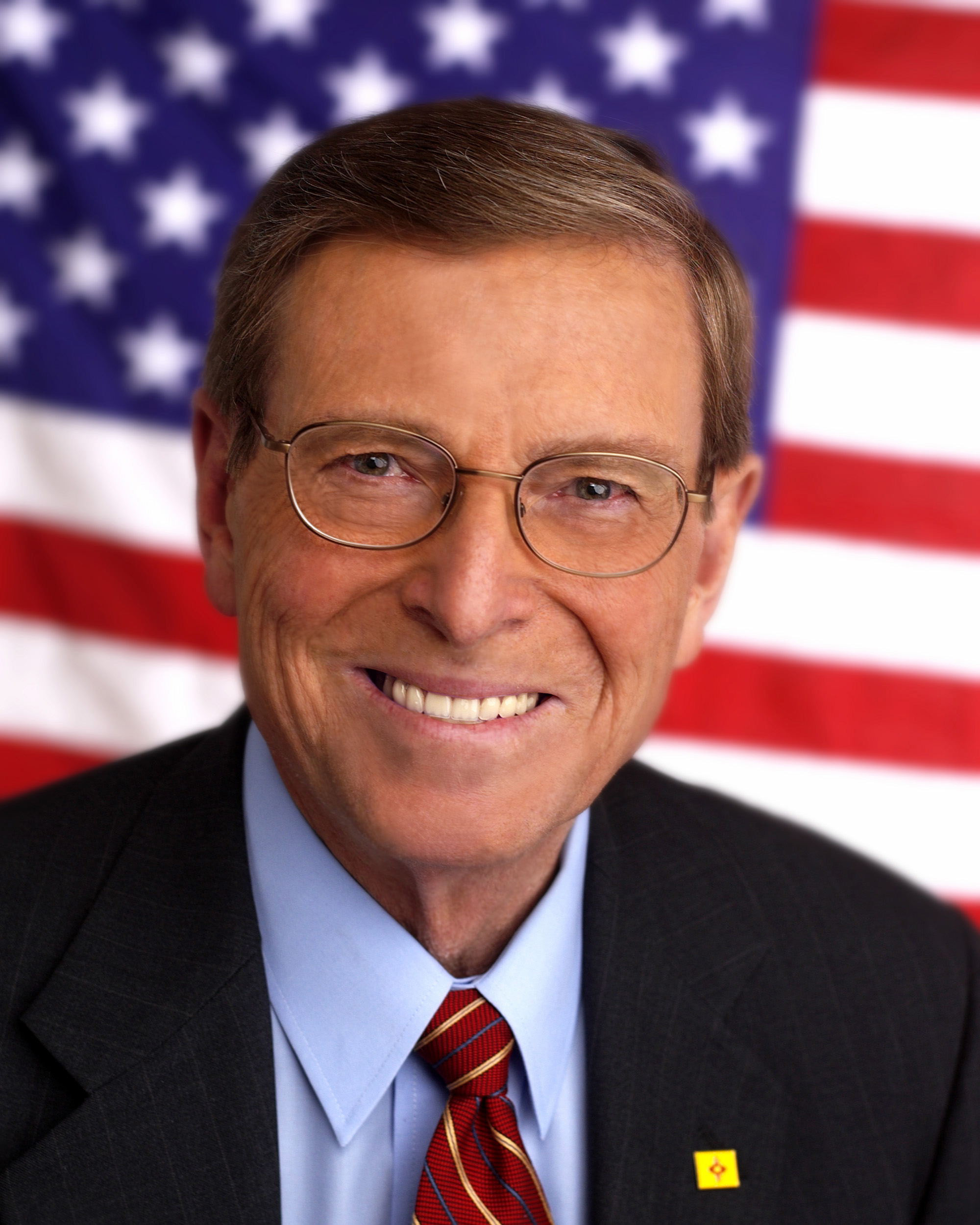

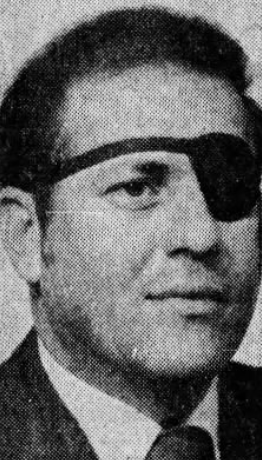
| Nominee | Pete Domenici | Tom Benavidez |
| Party | Republican | Democratic |
| Popular vote | 296,712 | 110,033 |
| Percentage | 72.95% | 27.05% |
- County results Domenici: 50–60% 60–70% 70–80% 80–90%
U.S. senator before election
Pete Domenici
Republican
Elected U.S. Senator
Pete Domenici
Republican

The 1990 United States Senate election in New Mexico was held on November 6, 1990. Incumbent Republican U.S. Senator Pete Domenici won re-election to a fourth term.

== Major candidates ==
=== Democratic ===
- Tom Benavidez, state senator

=== Republican ===
- Pete Domenici, incumbent U.S. Senator

== Results ==
General election results
| Party | Candidate | Votes | % |
|---|---|---|---|
| Republican | Pete Domenici (incumbent) | 296,712 | 72.95% |
| Democratic | Tom Benavidez | 110,033 | 27.05% |
| Republican hold | | | |

== See also ==
- 1990 United States Senate elections
