= 2002 United States Senate election in New Mexico =

- November 5, 2002
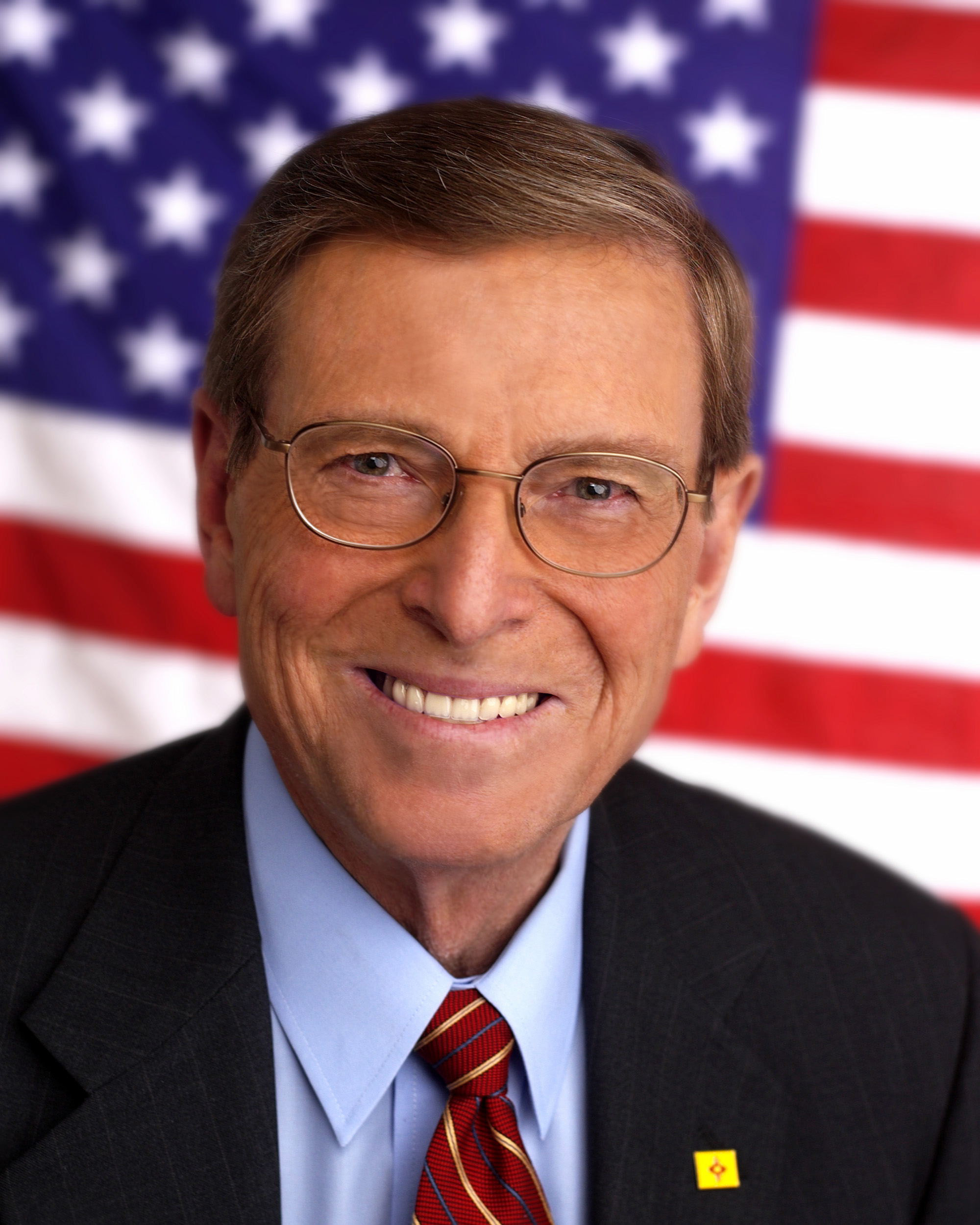

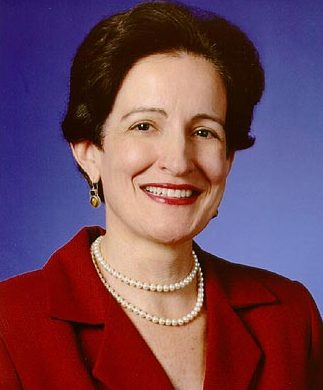
Nominee	Pete Domenici	Gloria Tristani
Party	Republican	Democratic
Popular vote	314,301	169,039
Percentage	65.03%	34.97%
- County results Domenici: 50–60% 60–70% 70–80% 80–90% Tristani: 50–60%
U.S. senator before election
Pete Domenici
Republican
Elected U.S. Senator
Pete Domenici
Republican

The 2002 United States Senate election in New Mexico was held on November 5, 2002. Incumbent Republican U.S. Senator Pete Domenici won re-election to a sixth term. To date, this is the last time a Republican won a U.S. Senate election in New Mexico.

Along with Maine and Oregon, this was one of the three Republican-held Senate seats up for election in a state that Al Gore won in the 2000 presidential election.

== Democratic primary ==
=== Candidates ===
- Gloria Tristani, member of the Federal Communications Commission and former Corporation Commissioner of New Mexico
- Francesa Lobato
- Don E. Durham (write-in)

=== Results ===
Democratic primary results
Party	Candidate	Votes	%
Democratic	Gloria Tristani	109,084	77.71%
Democratic	Francesa Lobato	31,228	22.24%
Democratic	Don E. Durham (write-in)	73	0.05%
Total votes		140,385	100.00%

== Republican primary ==
=== Candidates ===
- Pete Domenici, incumbent U.S. Senator
- Orlin G. Cole (write-in)

=== Results ===
Republican primary results
Party	Candidate	Votes	%
Republican	Pete Domenici (incumbent)	91,898	99.93%
Republican	Orlin G. Cole (write-in)	62	0.07%
Total votes		91,960	100.00%

== General election ==
=== Candidates ===
- Pete Domenici (R), incumbent U.S. Senator
- Gloria Tristani (D), member of the Federal Communications Commission and former Corporation Commissioner of New Mexico

=== Predictions ===
Source	Ranking	As of
Sabato's Crystal Ball	Safe R	November 4, 2002

=== Results ===
General election results
Party	Candidate	Votes	%	±%
Republican	Pete Domenici (incumbent)	314,301	65.03%	+0.31%
Democratic	Gloria Tristani	169,039	34.97%	+5.18%
Majority		145,262	30.05%	−4.90%
Turnout		483,340		
Republican hold		Swing		

==== Counties that flipped from Democratic to Republican ====
- Guadalupe (largest city: Santa Rosa)
- Mora (largest city: Mora)

==== Counties that flipped from Republican to Democratic ====
- Santa Fe (largest city: Santa Fe)
- San Miguel (largest city: Las Vegas)
- Taos (largest city: Taos)

== See also ==
- 2002 United States Senate election
