= 1996 United States Senate election in New Mexico =

- November 5, 1996
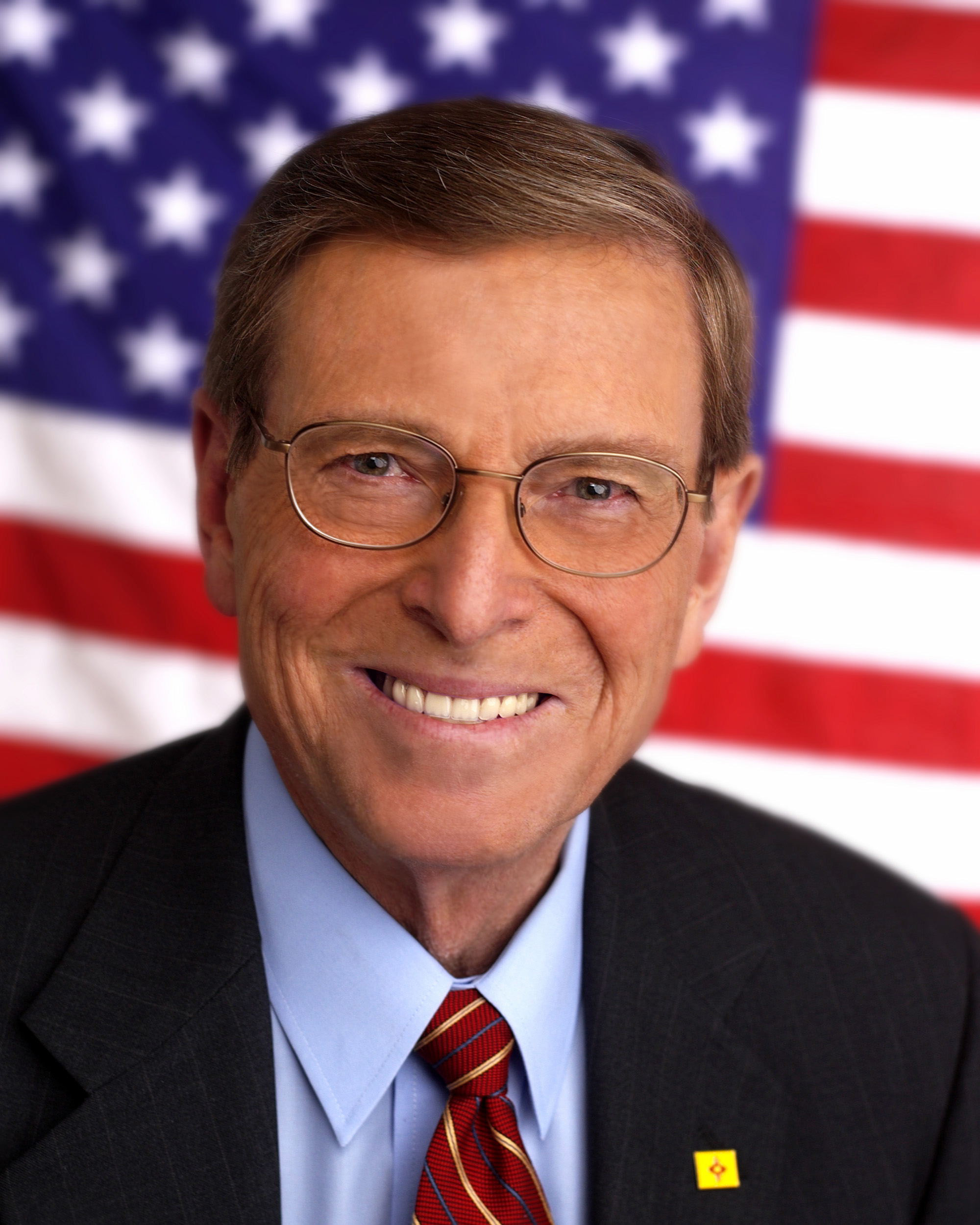

Nominee	Pete Domenici	Art Trujillo
Party	Republican	Democratic
Popular vote	357,171	164,356
Percentage	64.73%	29.78%
- County results Domenici: 40–50% 50–60% 60–70% 70–80% 80–90% Trujillo: 50–60%
U.S. senator before election
Pete Domenici
Republican
Elected U.S. Senator
Pete Domenici
Republican

The 1996 United States Senate election in New Mexico was held on November 5, 1996. Incumbent Republican U.S. Senator Pete Domenici won re-election to a fifth term.

== Democratic primary ==
=== Candidates ===
- Eric Treisman, attorney
- Art Trujillo, chairman of the Bernalillo County Democratic Party

=== Results ===
Democratic primary results
Party	Candidate	Votes	%
Democratic	Art Trujillo	84,721	70.55%
Democratic	Eric Treisman	35,363	29.45%
Total votes		120,084	100.00%

== Republican primary ==
=== Candidates ===
- Pete Domenici, incumbent U.S. senator

=== Results ===
Republican primary results
Party	Candidate	Votes	%
Republican	Pete Domenici (incumbent)	69,394	100.00%
Total votes		69,394	100.00%

== General election ==
=== Candidates ===
- Pete Domenici (R), incumbent U.S. senator
- Art Trujillo (D), chairman of the Bernalillo County Democratic Party

=== Results ===
General election results
Party	Candidate	Votes	%	±%
Republican	Pete Domenici (incumbent)	357,171	64.73%	−8.19%
Democratic	Art Trujillo	164,356	29.78%	+2.75%
Green	Abraham J. Gutmann	24,230	4.39%	
Libertarian	Bruce M. Bush	6,064	1.10%	
Majority		192,815	34.94%	−10.93%
Turnout		551,821		
Republican hold		Swing		

== See also ==
- 1996 United States Senate elections
