= 1978 United States Senate election in New Mexico =

- November 7, 1978
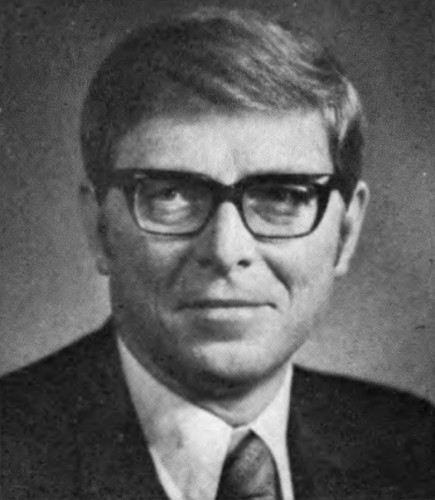

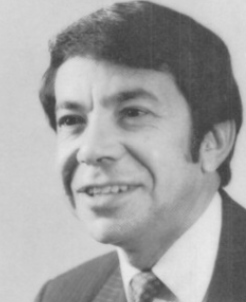
Nominee	Pete Domenici	Toney Anaya
Party	Republican	Democratic
Popular vote	183,442	160,045
Percentage	53.41%	46.59%
- County results Domenici: 50–60% 60–70% 70–80% Anaya: 50–60% 60–70%
U.S. senator before election
Pete Domenici
Republican
Elected U.S. Senator
Pete Domenici
Republican

The 1978 United States Senate election in New Mexico took place on November 7, 1978. Incumbent Republican U.S. Senator Pete Domenici successfully ran for re-election to a second term, defeating Democrat Toney Anaya. This election was the first time since 1934 that an incumbent Republican Senator from New Mexico was re-elected or won re-election and the first time since 1918 that an incumbent Republican Senator from New Mexico was re-elected or won re-election to this seat.

== Republican primary ==
=== Candidates ===
- Pete Domenici, incumbent U.S. Senator

== Democratic primary ==
=== Candidates ===
- Toney Anaya, Attorney General of New Mexico

== General election ==
=== Results ===
General election results
Party	Candidate	Votes	%
Republican	Pete Domenici (incumbent)	183,442	53.41%
Democratic	Toney Anaya	160,045	46.59%
Majority		23,397	6.81%
Total votes		343,487	100.00%
Republican hold			

== See also ==
- 1978 United States Senate elections
