= USS Walton =

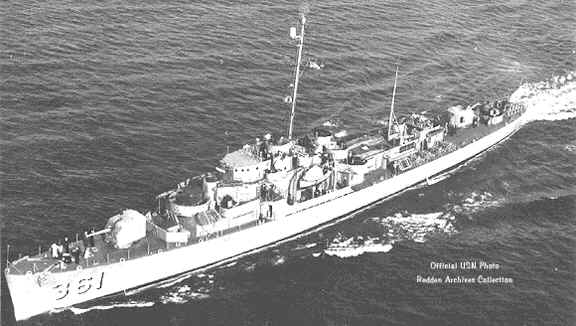
- USS Walton (DE-361)

History

United States
- Name: Walton
- Namesake: Merrit Cecil Walton
- Builder: Consolidated Steel Corporation, Orange, Texas
- Laid down: 21 March 1944
- Launched: 20 May 1944
- Commissioned: 4 September 1944
- Decommissioned: 31 May 1946
- Commissioned: 26 January 1951
- Decommissioned: 20 September 1968
- Stricken: 23 September 1968
- Identification: DE-361
- Fate: Sunk as target, 7 August 1969

General characteristics
- Class & type: John C. Butler-class destroyer escort
- Displacement: 1,350 long tons (1,372 t)
- Length: 306 ft (93 m)
- Beam: 36 ft 8 in (11.18 m)
- Draft: 9 ft 5 in (2.87 m)
- Propulsion: 2 boilers, 2 geared turbine engines, 12,000 shp (8,900 kW); 2 propellers
- Speed: 24 knots (44 km/h; 28 mph)
- Range: 6,000 nmi (11,000 km; 6,900 mi) at 12 kn (22 km/h; 14 mph)
- Complement: 14 officers, 201 enlisted
- Armament: 2 × single 5 in (127 mm) guns; 2 × twin 40 mm (1.6 in) AA guns; 10 × single 20 mm (0.79 in) AA guns; 1 × triple 21 in (533 mm) torpedo tubes; 8 × depth charge throwers; 1 × Hedgehog ASW mortar; 2 × depth charge racks

USS Walton (DE-361) was a John C. Butler-class destroyer escort in the United States Navy. It was named after Merrit Cecil Walton, a Marine Corps platoon sergeant with the U.S. 1st Marine Division, who died on Gavutu during the Battle of Guadalcanal and was posthumously awarded the Navy Cross for "extraordinary heroism".

Walton's keel was laid down at Consolidated Steel Corporation, in Orange, Texas, on 21 March 1944. The ship was launched on 20 May 1944, sponsored by Mrs. Clara Olson, mother of Sgt. Walton. The vessel was commissioned on 4 September 1944.

== Namesake ==
Merrit Cecil Walton was born on 18 December 1915 in St. Paul, Minnesota. He enlisted in the United States Marine Corps on 19 May 1937 at San Francisco, California, and initially served at San Diego, California, before going to the Asiatic Station that autumn. As a member of the 4th Marine Regiment, quartered in the International Settlement of Shanghai, China where he witnessed the Battle of Shanghai. He was promoted to private, 1st class on 10 May 1939. Returning to the United States in the autumn of 1940, he served successive tours of duty at the Marine barracks at Mare Island, Vallejo, California; the Naval Air Station, Lakehurst, New Jersey; Quantico, Virginia and New River, North Carolina. He was promoted to Sergeant on 1 August 1941 and platoon sergeant on 8 April 1942.

Walton was serving in a parachute battalion as part of the 1st Marine Division (Reinforced) that was selected to land in the Solomons in August 1942. Companies A and B of that battalion landed on the island of Gavutu on the morning of 7 August 1942. The enemy, already alerted by the landings on Guadalcanal and Tulagi, met the Marines' frontal assault with a withering fire. Walton volunteered to reconnoiter the position of a Japanese machine gun nest threatening his platoon's right flank. Once he had spotted the weapon's location, he led a daring attack during which the Marines silenced the gun. Mortally wounded, Walton died later that same day. He was posthumously awarded the Navy Cross, the Purple Heart and a share of the Presidential Unit Citation awarded the 1st Marine Division (Reinforced).

== Operational history ==
=== World War II ===
After she conducted her shakedown out of Great Sound Bay, Bermuda, Walton underwent post-shakedown availability at the Boston Navy Yard. The new destroyer escort subsequently sailed for Hampton Roads, Virginia, and arrived at Norfolk on 15 November. While in that vicinity, she served as a school ship, training nucleus crews for the other destroyer escorts then entering the fleet.

When Escort Division 85 was established, Walton was assigned to it and sailed for the Pacific. She transited the Panama Canal on 7 December and arrived at Bora Bora, in the Society Islands, on 22 December. From there the destroyer escort pushed on for Port Purvis on Florida Island in the Solomons, and moved thence to Seeadler Harbor, Manus, in the Admiralty Islands. While at Manus, the ship underwent repairs and alterations. During that refit, her after 40 millimeter twin Bofors mount was replaced by a quadruple-mount Bofors, a necessary augmentation of the ship's anti-aircraft battery that reflected the growing concern over the destructive attacks of Japanese kamikaze.

Walton began her first active wartime duty at Hollandia late in January of the following year. On 21 January 1945, the destroyer escort departed that port, bound for the Philippines as part of the escort for a large convoy of merchantmen slow fleet auxiliaries, and amphibious vessels. Informed that those sea lanes had been, of late, patrolled by Japanese submarines and that enemy planes might be encountered, Walton and her fellow escorts alertly screened the important convoy bound for the Allies' westernmost outpost. After a 10-day voyage, the convoy arrived safely at its destination, San Pedro Bay, Leyte, on the last day of the month.

During February, March, and April, Walton escorted convoys between Hollandia and Lingayen Gulf, Philippines. She also made runs between Leyte and Kossol Roads, in the Palaus, as well as trips to Mangarin Bay, Mindoro, Philippines. During the later part of April the destroyer escort patrolled the waters between Homonhon Island and Dinagat, at the mouth of Leyte Gulf.

In May, Walton visited Manila, Leyte, and Hollandia, before CortDiv 85 received orders to sail for Subic Bay to relieve another division of destroyer escorts that had been conducting antisubmarine sweeps along the west coast of Luzon. Those patrols had been instituted primarily to interdict the flow of enemy submarines from bases in China, Formosa, or the Japanese home islands themselves. Secondarily, Walton and her sister ships were to train British and American submarines prior to their departure for extended war patrols and to escort them to and from a release point where they were starting or finishing such patrols.

During the course of those ensuing duties, Walton escorted USS Brill to Cape Calavite, Mindoro, where the fleet submarine torpedoed a beached and abandoned Japanese tanker. Walton salvaged all equipment of worth from the erstwhile enemy vessel and then stood off while Brill completed the demolition work with three torpedoes. On 28 July, Walton departed Subic Bay in company with USS Rolf and later rendezvoused with USS Douglas A. Munro to form a hunter-killer group on the eastern coast of Luzon, off Casiguran Bay. They swept northeast of Luzon and across the convoy lane between Leyte and Okinawa, without success, before Walton was relieved by USS Johnnie Hutchins off Aparri.

Walton spent the remainder of August at Subic Bay and was there when hostilities with Japan ceased in mid-month. As the fleet moved northward to Japanese waters to commence the occupation of the former enemy's homeland, its necessary train followed. Walton escorted USS Chepachet to a point where the oiler rendezvoused with a fast carrier task group at the end of August, before the destroyer escort put into Buckner Bay, anchoring there on 2 September 1945 – the day of Japan's formal surrender.

Walton later departed Okinawa to escort hospital ship USS Mercy to Jinsen (now Inchon), Korea. En route, the ships kept a vigilant lookout for stray mines; and Walton exploded 11 of them as the ships passed through the Yellow Sea. Arriving at Jinsen on 8 September, Mercy soon commenced taking care of the many Allied prisoners of war and internees from a camp near the Korean port. Walton consequently found employment as a river pilot ship, leading vessels which did not have adequate anchorage or area charts – a necessary precaution due to the many narrow and shallow passages in the waters off Jinsen. On 26 September, while engaged in that duty, Walton suffered damage when an LCT – under tow by USS LST-557 – collided with her port bow, opening a large hole and breaking several frames above the waterline.

Repaired alongside USS Jason, Walton subsequently escorted USS Geneva to Taku, China. Once there, the attack transport embarked internees from camps in North China and sailed from that port for the Shantung peninsula and South China. Walton stood by while Geneva embarked former civilian internees at Qingdao, and she accompanied the transport on a voyage to Hong Kong. While en route, on 10 and 11 October, the ships rode out the outer edge of a typhoon swirling its way up the China coast. Walton – although buffeted by 30-and-40-foot (9.1 and 12.2 m) waves and winds clocked at over 60 knots (110 km/h) – sustained no material damage.

Arriving at Hong Kong on 13 October, Walton remained at that port until 4 November when she weighed anchor for Shanghai, China – where her namesake had served in the late 1930s – and escorted the stores issue ship USS Iolanda to that port. Walton next returned to Jinsen, hunting for and sinking stray mines while acting as an escort.

At Jinsen on 20 November, Walton received the long-awaited homeward-bound orders and, in company with USS Pratt, sailed for Okinawa. There, the two destroyer escorts embarked passengers – taking part in a phase of the Operation "Magic Carpet", the return home of discharge-bound veterans. On 25 November, they set out for the Hawaiian Islands, on the first leg of their voyage to the west coast of the United States. Arriving at San Pedro, California, nine days before Christmas of 1945, Walton subsequently shifted to San Diego where she was decommissioned and placed in reserve on 31 May 1946.

=== Korean War and fate ===
The destroyer escort remained inactive until the Korean War. Recommissioned at San Diego on 26 January 1951 Walton operated off the coast of California, training and assisting in the training of submarines and sonar teams, into the spring of the next year.

The destroyer escort – her homeport officially changed from San Diego to Pearl Harbor on 4 November 1951; she departed San Diego on 19 April 1952, bound for the Far East, in company with destroyer escorts USS Currier and USS Marsh. USS McCoy Reynolds rendezvoused with those three ships at Pearl Harbor to complete CortDiv 92. Walton arrived off Hungnam on 17 May and immediately assumed patrol and blockade duties off the Korean coast.

Over the next four months, Walton worked jointly with the naval units of other UN nations – Great Britain, Thailand, Colombia, and the Republic of Korea. During her patrols, the destroyer escort fired over 2,000 rounds of 5-inch (130 mm) ammunition at shore targets, provided close gunfire support for minesweeping operations; worked in conjunction with carrier strikes on coastal targets, and, during the latter operations, rescued a ditched Navy pilot. On one occasion, the ship sent a raiding party to reconnoiter a harbor on the far northern coast of Korea. Enemy machine guns opened up on the party, but a heavy fusillade from Walton's small boat silenced the gunners.

During that Far Eastern deployment, Walton also engaged in patrolling the Formosa Strait to keep Communist China from attacking Nationalist China on the island of Formosa. Besides the ship's active patrol and combat operations, she participated in hunter-killer evolutions in waters south of Japan. As a result of her Korean service in 1952, Walton received the Korean service Medal with one engagement star, the UN Service Medal, and the Republic of Korea Presidential Unit Citation.

Returning to Pearl Harbor on 29 August, Walton underwent a shipyard availability during September and, over the ensuing months, conducted a regular schedule of training operations in the Hawaiian operating area. After a major overhaul at Pearl Harbor, Walton got underway on 9 May 1953 sailing, via Midway, to the Far East. Subsequently, based at Sasebo, Japan, Walton operated briefly out of Pusan, South Korea, and then patrolled near Cheju Do, an island off the southern coast of South Korea. In July, she made a passage to Beppu, Japan, for a period of repairs alongside a tender, before she operated as a screening vessel with Task Force 77. She returned to Pusan soon thereafter, before resuming her patrols out of Sasebo to the eastern coast of South Korea.

Even after the signing of the armistice on 27 July brought an uneasy peace to the Korean peninsula, there was still work for Walton in Far Eastern waters. The ship participated in port visit to Hong Kong; underwent upkeep in Subic Bay, Philippines visited Yokosuka, Sasebo, and Kobe, Japan, and operated in Korean waters again that November before sailing as part of a simulated convoy screen and reaching Pearl Harbor on 11 December 1953.

Walton remained in Hawaiian waters into the summer of 1954, conducting a varying slate of operations that included exercises in gunnery communications engineering, antisubmarine warfare navigation, and tactics—broken from time to time by the usual upkeep and maintenance periods in port. She also participated in a hunter-killer exercise in May that helped to evaluate killer submarines. Departing Pearl Harbor on 15 June, Walton began her third deployment to the Western Pacific (WestPac). On 9 July, she relieved the seaplane tender USS Orca as station ship at Hong Kong and, outside a brief period of upkeep at Subic Bay, performed station ship duties at the British Crown Colony into the autumn. During the deployment, the ship sortied twice to evade typhoons swirling their way toward Hong Kong – typhoon Ida from 28 to 30 August and typhoon Pamela from 5 to 7 November.

Walton departed Hong Kong on 8 November and proceeded back to Pearl Harbor, via the Philippines, Guam and Midway, having to dodge two more typhoons (Ruby and Sally) while en route. The destroyer escort then spent the period from late November 1954 to early May 1955 in the Hawaiian Islands, training and undergoing needed upkeep.

On 11 May 1955, Walton set sail for the Marianas, on the first leg of her fourth WestPac voyage. While operating under the operational aegis of the Commander, Naval forces, Marianas, Walton carried out surveillance operations at Bikar Atoll, Erikub Atoll, Kwajalein, Rongerik Atoll, and Ailinglaplap Atoll. In June and July, Walton alternated making surveillance voyages to the places mentioned above with performing duties as search and rescue (SAR) ship operating out of Guam.

During the latter part of July, Walton visited the northern Marianas, the Bonin and Volcano Islands and Yokosuka, before she resumed SAR duties at Guam. She divided September between surveillance in the western Carolines and SAR at Guam before sailing on 22 September for Pearl Harbor. She arrived home, via Kwajalein, on 1 October.

Walton subsequently conducted two more WestPac deployments out of Pearl Harbor. During the fifth deployment, the ship visited Singapore, the Federated Malay States; Hong Kong; Kobe, Japan; the Marianas; and Chinhae, Korea; where she, in company with USS Bream and units of the ROK Navy, trained in antisubmarine warfare. Later, while en route from Japanese waters to Keelung, Taiwan, in company with USS Foss, Walton conducted an unsuccessful search for an American plane that had ditched in the ocean. The two destroyer escorts sighted nothing during the two-day quest.

During the ship's sixth WestPac deployment, in 1957 the ship conducted five surveillance cruises in the Bonins, the Carolines, and the northern Mariana Islands. Also – in company with her sister ship USS McGinty – she visited Townsville, Australia – via Subic Bay and Manus – arriving "down under" on 19 August 1957. After five days of hearty Australian hospitality, the two escort vessels set out for Pago Pago, Samoa, on the first leg of their voyage back to Pearl Harbor where they arrived on 5 November.

Following a three-month overhaul at the Pearl Harbor Naval Shipyard, Walton conducted underway training evolutions and type training in the Hawaiian Islands through the spring of 1958. Ultimately, on 30 June 1958, was reassigned to Reserve CortRon 1, Reserve CortDiv 12. With her home port officially changed to San Francisco, Walton underwent a brief availability alongside USS Bryce Canyon at Long Beach before she pushed on for her ultimate destination – San Francisco. She arrived at her new home port on 20 July.

Walton's mission was now to train Naval Reserve personnel. Over the next three years, she operated out of San Francisco on reserve training cruises that took the ship to such places as Mazatlán, Mexico, San Diego and Treasure Island, California; Pearl Harbor, Drake's Bay, California; Monterey, California; and Esquimalt, British Columbia. During the many two-week reserve cruises she conducted a variety of operations including "live" antisubmarine warfare training and gunnery exercises, highline transfers, general quarters drills, and underway refuelings in order to bring reservists up to date on latest methods and equipment. During that time, Walton won the Battle Efficiency "E" for Reserve CortRon 1 in 1959 and 1960.

While at Long Beach on 1 October 1961, Walton received word that, in the words of her command history "her shuttling about the west coast was ended for the time being." With her selected reserve crew of 70 men the destroyer escort was recalled to active duty as part of the overall buildup of military force ordered by President John F. Kennedy to meet the communist threat in Berlin and, possibly, elsewhere.

Again homeported at Pearl Harbor, Walton departed the west coast on 23 October for the Hawaiian Islands. She arrived eight days later and immediately commenced underway training evolutions. She later underwent a two-week availability alongside USS Hamul before she resumed underway training. On 4 December, the ship entered the Pearl Harbor Naval Shipyard to commence an overhaul that lasted through the end of the year 1961.

After further underway training evolutions in Hawaiian waters, Walton departed Pearl Harbor on 22 January 1962, bound for the Marianas, on the first leg of her seventh WestPac deployment. After stopping for a day at Guam, she arrived in Subic Bay on 6 February. Nine days later, she got underway for Da Nang, South Vietnam. Walton arrived off Da Nang on 17 February and immediately began patrols in company with units of the small South Vietnamese Navy. Returning to Subic Bay briefly toward the middle of March, and after visiting Manila and Hong Kong, the destroyer escort resumed patrols off the coastline of South Vietnam, operating from Da Nang. For the remainder of her tour, the destroyer escort was almost constantly on the move, shifting to Subic Bay and Yokosuka; and patrolling the strait of Korea, before she returned via Yokosuka to Pearl Harbor on 5 June.

Following a brief stint of local operations out of Pearl Harbor, Walton sailed for the west coast on 11 July 1962. Arriving at San Francisco on 1 August, she soon resumed her Naval Reserve training role. For the next five years, Walton operated off the west coast training reservists, with a brief interruption to provide disaster relief during the Christmas flood of 1964. Ultimately decommissioned on 20 September 1968, Walton was struck from the Navy List on 23 September 1968 and was sunk as a target on 7 August 1969.

== Honors ==
Walton earned two battle stars for her Korean War service.

== Notable former crew ==
- Jack Daniels, World War II
