= 1984 United States Senate election in New Mexico =

- November 6, 1984
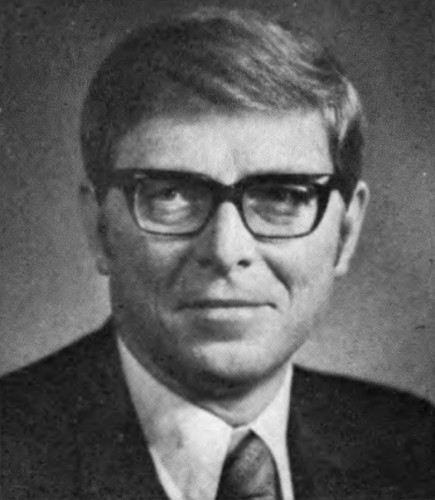

Nominee	Pete Domenici	Judith Pratt
Party	Republican	Democratic
Popular vote	361,371	141,253
Percentage	71.90%	28.10%
- County results Domenici: 50–60% 60–70% 70–80% 80–90%
U.S. senator before election
Pete Domenici
Republican
Elected U.S. Senator
Pete Domenici
Republican

The 1984 United States Senate election in New Mexico took place on November 6, 1984. Incumbent Republican U.S. Senator Pete Domenici successfully ran for re-election to a third term, defeating Democrat Judith Pratt.

== Republican primary ==
=== Candidates ===
- Pete Domenici, incumbent U.S. Senator

== Democratic primary ==
=== Candidates ===
- Anselmo A. Chavez, military veteran
- Nick Franklin, former state Democratic Party chairman
- Judith Pratt, state representative

=== Results ===
Democratic primary results
Party	Candidate	Votes	%
Democratic	Judith Pratt	67,722	45.50%
Democratic	Nick Franklin	56,434	37.91%
Democratic	Anselmo A. Chavez	24,694	16.59%
Majority		11,288	7.58%
Total votes		148,850	100.00%

== General election ==
=== Results ===
General election results
Party	Candidate	Votes	%
Republican	Pete Domenici (incumbent)	361,371	71.90%
Democratic	Judith Pratt	141,253	28.10%
N/A	Others	10	0.00%
Majority		220,118	43.79%
Total votes		502,634	100.00%
Republican hold			

== See also ==
- United States Senate elections, 1984
