= Domenici Institute =

The Domenici Institute is a public policy institute at New Mexico State University named after retired Sen. Pete Domenici, New Mexico's longest-serving senator. Each year, the institute holds its Domenici Public Policy Conference, which brings together some of the best minds in the country to focus on significant national issues. The institute also holds a series of forums throughout the year focusing on public policy issues.

== The Domenici Public Policy Conference ==
=== 2010 Domenici Conference ===
The 2010 Domenici Public Policy Conference, held Sept. 1-2, 2010, focused on financial reform, national security and analysis of the 2010 election.

Lt. Gov. Diane Denish and 3rd Judicial District Attorney Susana Martinez, both candidates for New Mexico governor, separately presented the major policy initiatives they would advance in office during the second morning of the conference. Following their presentations, Denish and Martinez took questions from university student panelists.

As part of the conference, ABC News contributor Sam Donaldson moderated a discussion between Fox News contributor Karl Rove and political analyst Joe Lockhart, taking an in-depth look at the 2010 midterm election. Donaldson is a longtime newsman who began working for ABC News in the 1960s and later went on to host a number of news programs for the network. Rove served as deputy chief of staff and senior adviser to former President George W. Bush. He is also a columnist for The Wall Street Journal and Newsweek. Lockhart served as press secretary for former President Bill Clinton from 1998-2000. He is now a political analyst and commentator.

Kay Bailey Hutchison addressed border security issues. She is the first – and, to date, the only – woman elected to represent Texas in the U.S. Senate. She is the senior Republican on the Senate Committee on Commerce, Science and Transportation. Additionally, she serves on the Appropriations Committee, the Committee on Banking, Housing and Urban Affairs and the Committee on Rules and Administration.

Sam Nunn spoke about nuclear nonproliferation. He is co-chairman and CEO of the Nuclear Threat Initiative, a charitable organization working to reduce the global threats from nuclear, biological and chemical weapons. He served as a U.S. senator from Georgia for 24 years from 1972 to 1996. During his tenure in the Senate, he served as chairman of the Senate Armed Services Committee and the Permanent Subcommittee on Investigations.

Thomas Hoenig covered financial reform. He is the chief executive of the Tenth District Federal Reserve Bank in Kansas City, Mo. He earned a bachelor's in economics and mathematics from Benedictine College and a master's and Ph.D. in economics from Iowa State University.

=== 2009 Domenici Conference ===
The 2009 Domenici Public Policy Conference, held Sept. 16-17, 2009 at NMSU's Corbett Center, was headlined by U.S. Homeland Security Secretary Janet Napolitano. That year's topics included the U.S. economy and national debt, homeland security, the U.S./Mexico border and nuclear energy.

David Walker, former director of the U.S. Government Accountability Office spoke about the U.S. economy and the national debt. Alex Flint, senior vice president at the Nuclear Energy Institute, spoke about nuclear energy.

As in the previous year's conference, students from universities around the New Mexico, including NMSU, New Mexico Tech, the University of New Mexico, Eastern New Mexico University, Western New Mexico University, Northern New Mexico College and New Mexico Highlands University had a chance to interact with the conference speakers and ask about their views at the conclusion of each session.

=== 2008 Domenici Conference ===
U.S. Senator and former presidential candidate Chris Dodd joined a prominent list of speakers for the inaugural Domenici Public Policy Conference, Aug. 20-22, at New Mexico State University.

Former U.S. Secretary of State James Baker, New Mexico Governor Bill Richardson, U.S. Senator Jeff Bingaman and former U.S. Representative Manuel Lujan, Jr. all spoke during the event, along with a host of other local and national leaders. The conference closed with a free picnic and free concert performed by country music star Randy Travis.

Domenici Conference sessions focused on topics important to the senator during his time in office, including behavioral health, national security, the federal budget and nuclear nonproliferation.

Other conference speakers included Paul Robinson, former ambassador and president emeritus of Sandia National Laboratories; Michael J. Fitzpatrick, executive director of the National Alliance on Mental Illness; William Hoagland, a former member of Domenici's staff; and Siegfried Hecker, co-director of the Center for International Security and Cooperation.
