= Elaine Anaya =

First Lady of New Mexico from 1983 to 1987

First Lady of New Mexico
- In role January 1, 1983 – January 1, 1987
- Governor: Toney Anaya
- Preceded by: Alice King
- Succeeded by: Kathy Carruthers

Personal details
- Born: 1943 Hanover, Pennsylvania
- Died: November 9, 2021 (aged 77–78) Santa Fe, New Mexico
- Party: Democratic
- Spouse: Toney Anaya (m. 1969)
- Children: 3

Elaine Anaya (1943 – November 9, 2021) was an American fiber artist, jewelry designer, and weaver, who served as the First Lady of New Mexico from 1983 to 1987 during the tenure of her husband, Governor Toney Anaya. Anaya used her position as the state's first lady to promote early childhood education and the Museum of New Mexico, as well as issues related to homelessness, human trafficking, mental health and domestic violence.

== Biography ==
Anaya was born and raised in Hanover, Pennsylvania in 1943. She met her husband, attorney Toney Anaya from Moriarty, New Mexico, in the 1960s while she was working for the United States Department of Labor in Washington D.C. and he was an aide for Senator Joseph Montoya. The couple, who were married 1969, moved to a home near New Mexico's Sangre de Cristo Mountains, and had three children, Kimberly, Kristina, and Toney Jr. Anaya reportedly became enamored with her adopted state and actively discouraged her husband from taking positions back in Washington D.C.

An artist, weaver and tapestry maker, Anaya incorporated New Mexican designs and motifs into her pieces. Examples of her work are exhibited in museums and galleries throughout New Mexico, including at the El Rancho de las Golondrinas, a former ranch and living history museum in Santa Fe. She also worked in ceramics, beadwork, pottery, and turquoise and silver jewelry design.

Toney Anaya was elected Attorney General of New Mexico from 1975 to 1979 and Governor of New Mexico from 1983 to 1987. Elaine Anaya used her position as the 23rd First Lady of New Mexico to promote the arts and the state's extensive museum system. Her interest extended to the state museums' vast collection of artefacts, which were often off limits to the general public. The first lady devised a system to identify significant artefacts and other pieces which were in storage and worked to have them displayed in museums, government buildings, nonprofits, and public spaces throughout the state. Elaine Anaya also worked to expand access to early childhood education programs. Her other signature issues included combatting homelessness, domestic violence, and human trafficking.

Anaya was a member of weaving guilds in the city of Santa Fe and northern New Mexico and served on the board of directors of the Española Fiber Arts Center in Española, New Mexico.

Elaine Anaya died at her home in Santa Fe, New Mexico, on November 9, 2021, at the age of 78. She had recently undergone cancer surgery but had been expected to recover. She was survived by her husband, former Governor Toney Anaya, three children, and 15 grandchildren.
