= 1970 New Mexico gubernatorial election =

- November 3, 1970
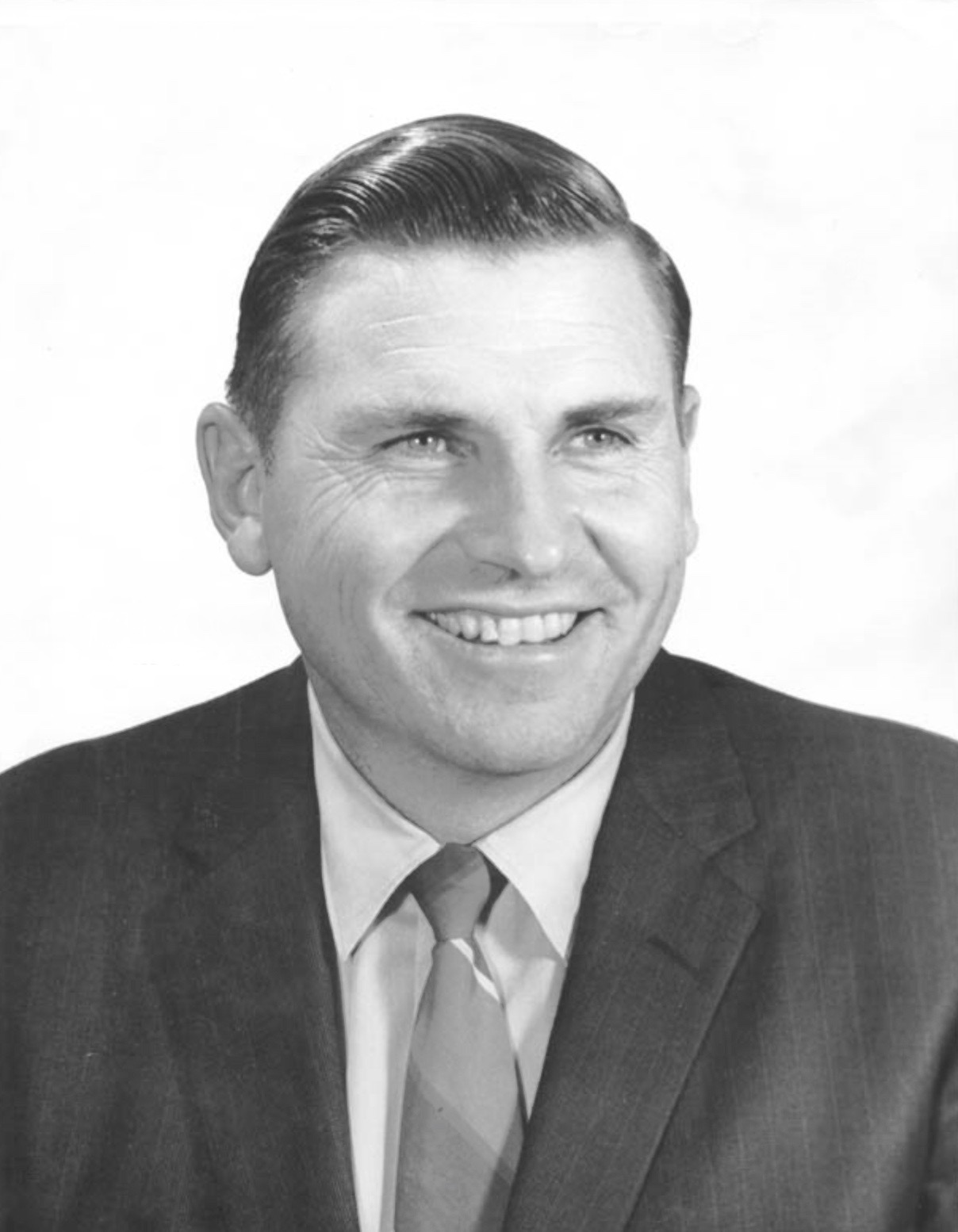

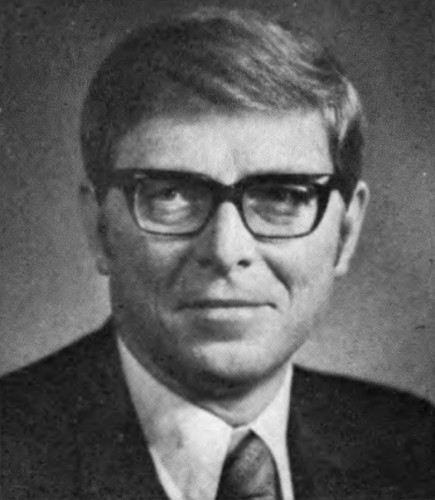
Nominee	Bruce King	Pete Domenici
Party	Democratic	Republican
Popular vote	148,835	134,640
Percentage	51.26%	46.37%
- County results King: 50–60% 60–70% 70–80% Domenici: 50–60% 60–70%
Governor before election
David Cargo
Republican
Elected Governor
Bruce King
Democratic

The 1970 New Mexico gubernatorial election took place on November 3, 1970, in order to elect the Governor of New Mexico. Due to term limits, incumbent Republican David Cargo was ineligible to seek a third term as governor. This election was the first in which the governor was elected for a four-year term. Prior to this, the governor was elected to a two-year term, renewable once. This was the last time until 2006 that a Democrat carried Otero County and Sierra County.

== Primary election ==
=== Democratic primary ===
The Democratic primary was won by state representative Bruce King.

==== Campaign ====
A major issue in the election was how the University of New Mexico should deal with anti-war protesters. Defenders of the University did so on the grounds of free speech, and opponents argued on the grounds of law and order.

Jack Daniels ran as a moderate liberal candidate, and he became the strongest defender of the University of New Mexico throughout the campaign. King was the other moderate liberal candidate, and he and Daniels agreed on most issues, with them both supporting the University of New Mexico. However, Daniels was more vigorous in his support, constantly advertising and emphasizing that he supported the University's position, while King mostly avoided the issue. On the other hand, Alexander Sceresse attacked the University, calling for law and order. The Democratic primary had above-average turnout, with 54% voting, and King beat Daniels 49%–37%, with Sceresse only getting 14% of the vote. Bruce King then went on to become Governor of New Mexico.

==== Results ====
Democratic primary results
Party	Candidate	Votes	%
Democratic	Bruce King	62,718	48.94%
Democratic	Jack Daniels	47,523	37.08%
Democratic	Alexander Sceresse	17,918	13.98%
Total votes		128,159	100.00%

=== Republican primary ===
The Republican primary was won by Mayor of Albuquerque Pete Domenici.

==== Results ====
Republican primary results
Party	Candidate	Votes	%
Republican	Pete Domenici	25,881	45.99%
Republican	Stephen C. Helbing	13,265	23.57%
Republican	Edward M. Hartman	5,309	9.43%
Republican	Tom Clear	5,262	9.35%
Republican	Junio Lopez	4,272	7.59%
Republican	Edward V. Balcomb	2,289	4.07%
Total votes		56,278	100.00%

== General election ==
=== Results ===
1970 New Mexico gubernatorial election
Party	Candidate	Votes	%	±%
Democratic	Bruce King	148,835	51.26%	+1.96%
Republican	Pete Domenici	134,640	46.37%	−3.84%
Independent	John A. Salazar	4,652	1.60%	
People's Constitutional	Wilfredo Sedillo	2,237	0.77%	+0.29%
	Scattering	11	0.00%	
Majority		14,195	4.89%	
Total votes		290,375	100.00%	
Democratic gain from Republican		Swing	+5.80%	

=== Results by county ===
County	Bruce King Democratic		Pete V. Domenici Republican		John A. Salazar Independent		Wilfredo Sedillo PCP		Margin		Total votes cast
County	#	%	#	%	#	%	#	%	#	%	Total votes cast
Bernalillo	40,973	43.65%	49,882	53.14%	2,276	2.42%	725	0.77%	-8,909	-9.49%	93,864 (Note: Includes 8 write-in votes)
Catron	638	62.00%	382	37.12%	3	0.29%	6	0.58%	256	24.88%	1,029
Chaves	4,887	41.22%	6,834	57.65%	49	0.41%	85	0.72%	-1,947	-16.42%	11,855
Colfax	2,418	55.57%	1,860	42.75%	48	1.10%	25	0.57%	558	12.82%	4,351
Curry	4,679	55.92%	3,642	43.53%	12	0.14%	34	0.41%	1,037	12.39%	8,367
De Baca	647	68.39%	289	30.55%	6	0.63%	4	0.42%	358	37.84%	946
Doña Ana	8,751	53.22%	7,416	45.10%	144	0.88%	133	0.81%	1,335	8.12%	16,444
Eddy	7,129	57.58%	5,127	41.41%	48	0.39%	77	0.62%	2,002	16.17%	12,381
Grant	4,435	61.84%	2,597	36.21%	84	1.17%	56	0.78%	1,838	25.63%	7,172
Guadalupe	1,206	58.40%	844	40.87%	4	0.19%	11	0.53%	362	17.53%	2,065
Harding	312	47.20%	341	51.59%	4	0.61%	4	0.61%	-29	-4.39%	661
Hidalgo	925	70.77%	371	28.39%	3	0.23%	8	0.61%	554	42.39%	1,307
Lea	7,375	57.68%	5,320	41.60%	34	0.27%	58	0.45%	2,055	16.07%	12,787
Lincoln	1,199	46.80%	1,336	52.15%	17	0.66%	10	0.39%	-137	-5.35%	2,562
Los Alamos	2,230	37.47%	3,466	58.24%	225	3.78%	30	0.50%	-1,236	-20.77%	5,951
Luna	1,911	56.89%	1,419	42.24%	9	0.27%	20	0.60%	492	14.65%	3,359
McKinley	4,295	52.60%	3,613	44.25%	125	1.53%	132	1.62%	682	8.35%	8,165
Mora	1,084	55.25%	850	43.32%	23	1.17%	5	0.25%	234	11.93%	1,962
Otero	4,423	52.87%	3,676	43.94%	189	2.26%	78	0.93%	747	8.93%	8,366
Quay	2,306	60.99%	1,440	38.09%	11	0.29%	24	0.63%	866	22.90%	3,781
Rio Arriba	5,379	62.58%	3,030	35.25%	138	1.61%	49	0.57%	2,349	27.33%	8,596
Roosevelt	2,340	54.30%	1,916	44.47%	24	0.56%	29	0.67%	424	9.84%	4,309
San Juan	5,491	46.29%	5,982	50.43%	214	1.80%	176	1.48%	-491	-4.14%	11,863
San Miguel	3,876	54.50%	2,952	41.51%	204	2.87%	80	1.12%	924	12.99%	7,112
Sandoval	3,239	64.72%	1,626	32.49%	98	1.96%	42	0.84%	1,613	32.23%	5,005
Santa Fe	11,147	60.47%	6,805	36.92%	386	2.09%	93	0.50%	4,342	23.56%	18,433 (Note: Includes 2 write-in votes)
Sierra	1,295	52.69%	1,115	45.36%	17	0.69%	31	1.26%	180	7.32%	2,458
Socorro	1,971	49.36%	1,974	49.44%	33	0.83%	15	0.38%	-3	-0.08%	3,993
Taos	3,175	56.24%	2,363	41.86%	61	1.08%	45	0.80%	812	14.38%	5,645 (Note: Includes 1 write-in vote)
Torrance	1,566	67.01%	737	31.54%	19	0.81%	15	0.64%	829	35.47%	2,337
Union	1,143	60.28%	731	38.55%	4	0.21%	18	0.95%	412	21.73%	1,896
Valencia	6,390	56.28%	4,704	41.43%	140	1.23%	119	1.05%	1,686	14.85%	11,353
Total	148,835	51.26%	134,640	46.37%	4,652	1.60%	2,237	0.77%	14,195	4.89%	290,375

==== Counties that flipped from Republican to Democratic ====
- Catron
- Curry
- Eddy
- Lea
- Luna
- Mora
- Quay
- Roosevelt
- San Miguel
- Sierra
- Torrance
- Union

==== Counties that flipped from Democratic to Republican ====
- Socorro
