= Toney Anaya =

26th governor of New Mexico (born 1941)

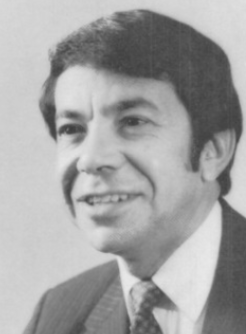

26th Governor of New Mexico
- In office January 1, 1983 – January 1, 1987
- Lieutenant: Mike Runnels
- Preceded by: Bruce King
- Succeeded by: Garrey Carruthers

24th Attorney General of New Mexico
- In office January 1, 1975 – January 1, 1979
- Governor: Jerry Apodaca
- Preceded by: David L. Norvell
- Succeeded by: Jeff Bingaman

Personal details
- Born: April 29, 1941 (age 85) Moriarty, New Mexico, U.S.
- Party: Democratic
- Spouse: Elaine Anaya (m. 1969; died 2021)
- Children: 3
- Education: Georgetown University (BA); American University (JD)

Toney Anaya (born April 29, 1941) is an American politician and attorney who served as the 26th governor of New Mexico from 1983 to 1987.

== Early life and career ==
Anaya was born on April 29, 1941 in Moriarty, New Mexico. He earned a Bachelor of Arts degree in economics and political science from Georgetown University and a Juris Doctor from American University's Washington College of Law in 1967.

Anaya met his wife, Elaine Anaya, in Washington D.C. during the 1960s while he was an aide to Senator Joseph Montoya and she was working for the United States Department of Labor. The couple dated for two years before marrying in 1969. They returned to New Mexico and settled in a home near the Sangre de Cristo Mountains. They had three children - Kimberly, Kristina, and Toney Jr.

== Career ==
After returning to New Mexico, Anaya worked as a Santa Fe County attorney and assistant district attorney for the First Judicial District. He later established a private law practice in Santa Fe.

=== New Mexico Attorney General ===
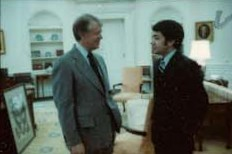
Anaya with President Jimmy Carter in 1978

From 1975 to 1979, Anaya served as New Mexico Attorney General. During his service as attorney general, Anaya oversaw an investigation of the upward curve in the level of drugs in the Penitentiary of New Mexico after 1972. In 1975 his investigation found that some penitentiary staff members not only overlooked drug trafficking but were actually involved in it. The trafficking involved both street drugs, such as heroin, and drugs pilfered from the prison's pharmacy. The 1975 investigation reported very loose controls on pharmacy drugs.

Anaya launched a nine-month investigation of the Penitentiary of New Mexico administration, resulting in a 27-page 1975 report. The report documented traffic in heroin, cocaine, cash and liquor in the penitentiary. It also concluded that sides of beef had been regularly diverted from the prison kitchen loading docks into the pickup trucks of certain favored correctional officers.

Anaya and state Corrections Department Director Michael Francke signed a consent order in the U.S. District Court for New Mexico compelling the Penitentiary of New Mexico to improve classification practices, stop illegal disciplinary procedures, reduce overcrowding, and significantly improve the food, water supply, plumbing, heating, ventilation and electricity. Ordered by District Judge Edwin Felter, the decree was largely ignored and unenforced for more than three and a half years prior to the New Mexico State Penitentiary riot. In 1978, Anaya ran for the United States Senate, but was defeated by incumbent Republican Pete Domenici. In 1982, he was elected the 26th governor of New Mexico.

=== Governor of New Mexico ===
As governor, Anaya focused on energy alternatives, water development and conservation, the environment, education, and economic development. Known as a visionary, he steered the state through a national recession, transforming New Mexico into a more technology-based economy and laying the groundwork for future deployment of rapid rail transit, education and social reform. In 1986, after the election of his successor, Garrey Carruthers, Anaya commuted the death sentences of all five death row inmates in New Mexico. He is a longtime opponent of capital punishment, had campaigned against the death penalty and in later interviews expressed no regret for the commutations. Anaya made headlines on March 28, 1986, by declaring New Mexico the nation's first "State of Sanctuary" for refugees from Central America.

Anaya served one term as governor, from 1983 to 1987. At that time, the New Mexico Constitution did not allow executive officers to succeed themselves for consecutive terms. That changed when a 1986 Constitutional amendment allowed state executive officers to serve two consecutive four-year terms for terms beginning January 1, 1991.

=== Later career ===
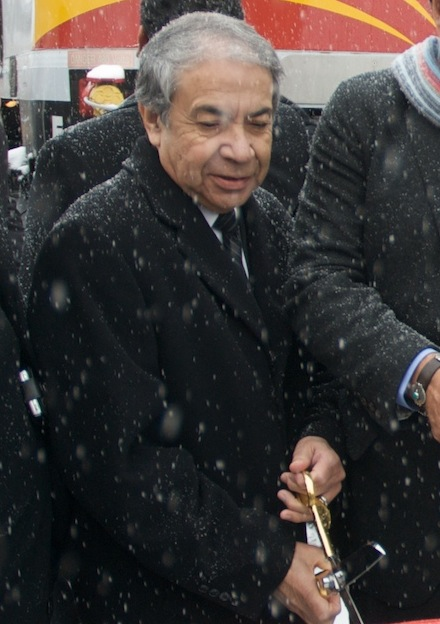
Anaya in 2008.

Since leaving office, Anaya has served on numerous boards, commissions, and at nonprofit organizations, primarily focusing on Hispanic issues, education, and politics. He contributed significantly to the Democratic National Committee and the North American Free Trade Agreement.

In 2009, New Mexico Governor Bill Richardson appointed Anaya to head the New Mexico Office of Recovery and Reinvestment. In that role, Anaya was responsible for overseeing the spending of the $1.8 billion in federal stimulus money expected to be invested in New Mexico during the next two years. Anaya worked closely with state agencies to facilitate access to funding, assist with compliance, and promote transparency throughout the process.

From August 2009 to January 2011, Anaya served as CEO of Natural Blue Resources, a Woburn, Massachusetts-based penny stock company specializing in investments in environmentally friendly companies, including a New Mexico-based initiative to sell purified water. In July 2014, Anaya was accused of serving as a front man for the company, which was actually controlled by an ex-convict who was legally barred from acting as an officer of a public company. Anaya entered into a civil settlement with the U.S. Securities and Exchange Commission relating to charges that he committed fraud. Under the terms of the settlement, Anaya agreed to a five-year ban from penny stock offerings and a cease-and-desist order without admitting or denying the charges.

His wife, former First Lady Elaine Anaya, died in November 2021.

== See also ==
- List of minority governors and lieutenant governors in the United States

Legal offices
Preceded by David L. Norvell	Attorney General of New Mexico; 1975–1979	Succeeded by Jeff Bingaman
Party political offices
Preceded by Jack Daniels	Democratic nominee for U.S. Senator from New Mexico (Class 2); 1978	Succeeded by Judith Pratt
Preceded by Bruce King	Democratic nominee for Governor of New Mexico; 1982	Succeeded by Ray Powell
Political offices
Preceded by Bruce King	Governor of New Mexico; 1983–1987	Succeeded by Garrey Carruthers
U.S. order of precedence (ceremonial)
Preceded by Martha McSally as Former U.S. Senator	Order of precedence of the United States; Within New Mexico	Succeeded by Garrey Carruthers as Former Governor
Preceded by Mary Fallin as Former Governor	Order of precedence of the United States; Outside New Mexico	Succeeded by Garrey Carruthers as Former Governor
