= University of Albuquerque =

American Catholic university (1920–1986)

Coordinates: 35°7′49″N 106°41′52″W

The University of Albuquerque
- Former names: St. Francis Summer College (1920–1940); Catholic Teachers' College of New Mexico (1940–1950); College of St. Joseph on the Rio Grande (1950–1966)
- Type: Private
- Active: 1920–1986
- Religious affiliation: Catholic
- President: Alfred McBride (1986)
- Faculty: 60 (1986)
- Students: 1,180 (1986)
- Location: Albuquerque, New Mexico, U.S.
- Campus: Urban, 68 acres (28 ha)
- Colors: Blue and gold
- Nickname: Dons

The University of Albuquerque was a Catholic liberal arts university in Albuquerque, New Mexico, United States. It opened in 1920 and closed in 1986. Its former campus on Albuquerque's West Side now houses St. Pius X High School.

== History ==
The institution was founded in 1920 as St. Francis Summer College. Located at St. Anthony's Orphanage, the college was operated by the Poor Sisters of St. Francis Seraph and offered continuing education classes for nuns during the summer. In 1940, it was taken over by the Archdiocese of Santa Fe and chartered as a full-time college called the Catholic Teachers' College of New Mexico, offering four-year programs in arts, sciences, and education. The college moved to a new location at the former Rio Grande Industrial School campus on South 2nd Street in 1946, and control was handed back to the Poor Sisters the following year. In 1950, the college changed its name to the College of St. Joseph on the Rio Grande and broke ground on a new campus atop a bluff overlooking the Rio Grande on Albuquerque's West Side. Classes began at the new location in 1951, encompassing a full liberal arts curriculum. The campus was formally dedicated by Archbishop Edwin Byrne in 1952.

During the 1950s and 1960s, enrollment grew steadily to more than 1,000 students and the college completed a gymnasium, arts and theater buildings, and dormitories. In 1960, it gained regional accreditation from the North Central Association of Colleges and Schools. By 1965, the college had 65 faculty members and offered a full liberal arts curriculum as well as pre-professional and graduate programs. In 1966, the name was changed to the University of Albuquerque, and a new student center was completed in 1967. However, by 1968 the university was in financial trouble and was forced to cut some of its departments and staff. Costs were further reduced in 1969 by cutting all intercollegiate athletic programs.

Under Frank Kleinhenz, its first lay president, the university reorganized its operations in the 1970s by relaxing admissions requirements and putting more emphasis on two-year and certificate programs in order to boost enrollment. This strategy was successful and the university reported a record 3,200 students in 1972. It was even able to build a new fine arts center, which opened in November of that year. However, Kleinhenz's resignation in 1973 triggered a period of instability and enrollment declined again. Faced with mounting debts and the prospect of increased competition after the Technical Vocational Institute was authorized to offer two-year degrees, the university announced its closing at the end of the 1986 spring semester.

Following the university's closing, the campus was repurposed to house St. Pius X High School as well as offices of the Archdiocese of Santa Fe. University of Albuquerque student records and transcripts are being housed in and can be retrieved from the University of New Mexico.

Fictitiously, the University of Albuquerque was still open and housed a renowned basketball program in the High School Musical film series (2006–2010), specifically High School Musical 2 and High School Musical 3: Senior Year. In the films, their team name and mascot are said to be the Redhawks.

== Campus ==
At the time of its closing in 1986, the university had a 68-acre (28 ha) campus with 17 buildings. Most of the main buildings are still standing and have been put to various uses. The first two buildings to be completed on the West Side campus were Assumption Hall and St. Francis Hall, both built in 1950–1952. The two-story brick buildings housed classrooms, offices, laboratories, a library, and a chapel, and now form the nucleus of the St. Pius X High School campus. St. Pius also took over the university's Fine Arts Learning Center (1972) and gymnasium. Other notable buildings on the main campus included the University Center (1967), and three women's dormitories—Madonna Hall (1961), St. Clare Hall (1964), and Lourdes Hall (1966). These buildings are used for various purposes by the Archdiocese of Santa Fe. There were also two men's dormitories located a short distance south of the main campus, Byrne House (1965) and Davis House (1966). These buildings are now part of the Desert Hills adolescent treatment center.

== Athletics ==
The University of Albuquerque's sports teams, nicknamed the Dons, competed as NAIA independents in basketball, baseball, golf, tennis, and soccer. From 1966 to 1969, they were also members of the NCAA College Division (Division II). The basketball team attained modest success, competing in the NAIA Men's Basketball Championships in 1964 (as St. Joseph), 1966, and 1968. They compiled a 1–3 tournament record with their only win coming against the University of New Haven in the 1966 edition. One of the Dons' most notable recruits was 6-foot-8-inch (2.03 m) center Zoilo Dominguez, a veteran of the Argentinean national team who was named a third-team All-American in 1966. Starting in 1963, the team played its home games at the now demolished Albuquerque Civic Auditorium.

Financial difficulties led the university to cancel all of its athletic programs at the end of the 1968–69 season. The basketball program was eventually reinstated in 1980, albeit with a greatly reduced budget and a team composed of walk-ons. The university was planning to re-apply for NAIA membership at the time of its closing in 1986.

== Notable alumni ==
- Mathias Barrett, homeless advocate, founder of The Little Brothers of the Good Shepherd
- Tom Benavidez, New Mexico State Senator
- Pete Domenici, U.S. Senator
- Rick Miera, New Mexico State Representative
- Richard M. Romero, New Mexico State Senator
- Henry Saavedra, New Mexico State Representative
- Patricio M. Serna, New Mexico Supreme Court Justice
- Thomas L. Shaffer, legal scholar
- Daniel P. Silva, New Mexico State Representative
