= Jack Daniels (New Mexico politician) =

American politician (1923–2003)

Member of the New Mexico House of Representatives
- In office 1967–1970
- Preceded by: Ray McNeill

Personal details
- Born: October 23, 1923 Council Bluffs, Iowa, US
- Died: September 4, 2003 (aged 79) Hobbs, New Mexico, US
- Party: Democratic

Jack Daniels (October 23, 1923 – September 3, 2003) was a Democratic New Mexico state representative. He ran unsuccessfully for the governorship in 1970, and for the United States Senate in 1972.

In his last major election against Pete Domenici in 1972, Daniels took advantage of his name, which was similar to that of Jack Daniel's, a popular alcoholic beverage. He handed out tiny bottles of Jack Daniel's whiskey while campaigning. Despite this, he still lost the election to Pete Domenici, 54% to 46%.

== Early life ==
Daniels was born in Council Bluffs, Iowa, in 1923. His family moved to Hobbs, New Mexico, in 1937. After graduation from New Mexico Military Institute in 1943, Daniels served on the destroyer USS Walton in the Pacific theater of World War II. He returned home to join his father's insurance agency. He served on the boards of a number of community associations, and was a New Mexico state representative from 1967 to 1970. He was appointed to the New Mexico State House by Governor Jack Campbell to succeed then-deceased Representative Ray McNeill.

== Governor election ==
In 1970, Daniels entered the Democratic primary in the race to fill the open seat left by outgoing liberal Republican governor David F. Cargo, who was unable to seek a third term due to term limits. A major issue in the election was how the University of New Mexico should deal with anti-war protesters. Defenders of the university did so on the grounds of free speech, and opponents argued on the grounds of law and order.

Daniels ran as a moderate liberal candidate, and he became the strongest defender of the University of New Mexico throughout the campaign. Bruce King was the other moderate liberal candidate, and he and Daniels agreed on most issues, with them both supporting the University of New Mexico. However, Daniels was more vigorous in his support, constantly advertising and emphasizing that he supported the university's position, while Bruce King mostly avoided the issue. On the other hand, Alexander Sceresse attacked the university, calling for law and order. The Democratic primary had above-average turnout, with 54% voting, and King beat Daniels 49%-37%, with Sceresse only getting 14% of the vote. Bruce King then went on to become Governor of New Mexico.

== Senate election ==
In 1972 New Mexico's senior U.S. senator, Clinton Presba Anderson, retired for health reasons. Jack Daniels was nominated as the Democrat in his place and ran against Republican Pete Domenici, but lost with Domenici winning 54% of the vote. The election was affected by the presidential election, because Richard Nixon was up for reelection in 1972, and he was very popular in New Mexico. Furthermore, George McGovern, Nixon's opponent, was considered too liberal by many of the New Mexico voters, which hurt local Democrats like Jack Daniels. However, Jack Daniels gained prominence in the election when he gave out Jack Daniel's whiskey at his campaign rallies.

== Death and legacy ==
In his later years, Daniels was diagnosed with Alzheimer's. He died on September 3, 2003, in Hobbs, New Mexico. In his memory, Governor Bill Richardson ordered that flags be flown on half-staff on September 5.

His daughter, Diane Denish, served two terms as Lieutenant Governor of New Mexico and ran unsuccessfully for governor in 2010.

Party political offices
Preceded by Clinton Anderson	Democratic nominee for U.S. Senator from New Mexico (Class 2); 1972	Succeeded by Toney Anaya
