= List of United States senators from New Mexico =

Current delegation

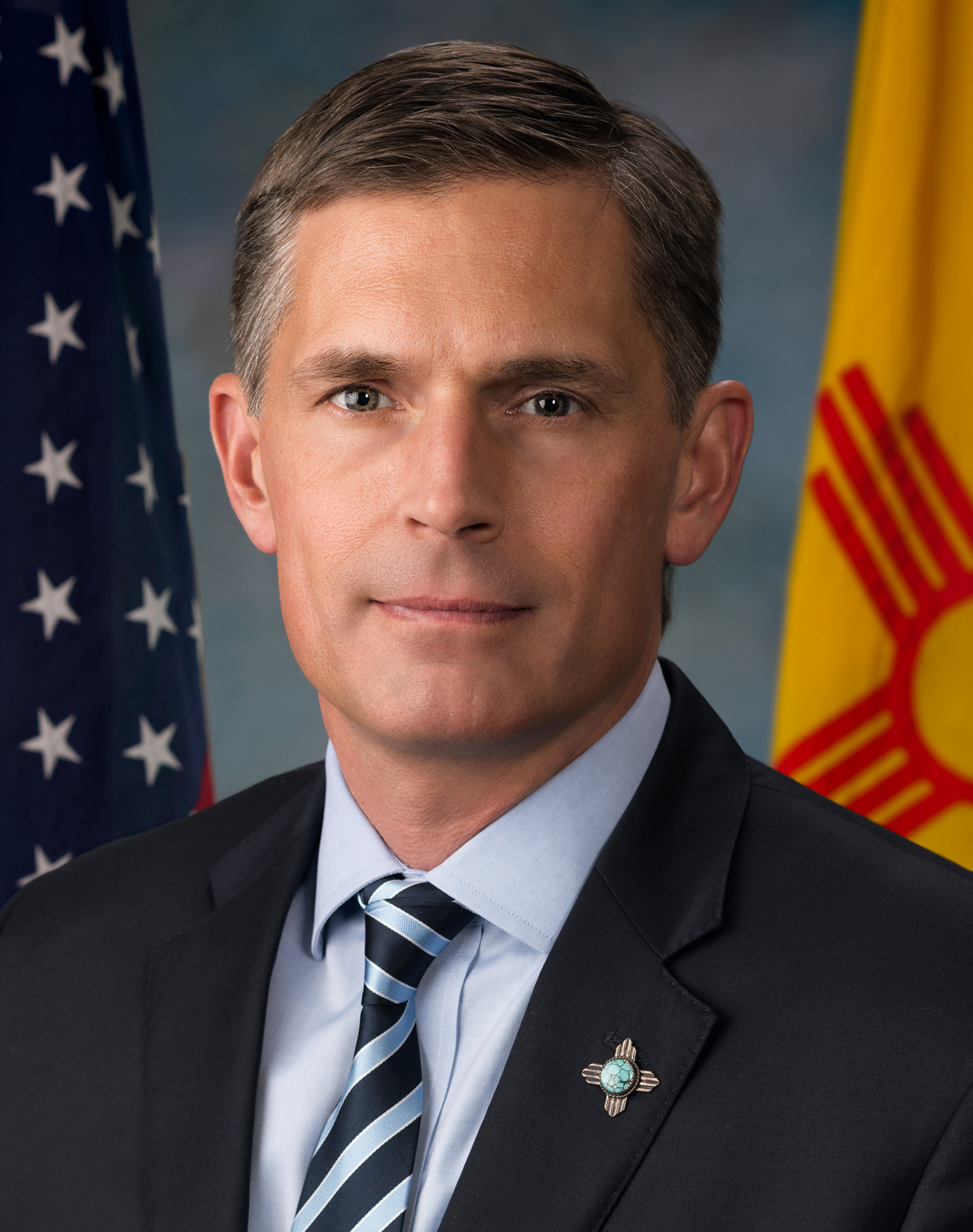
Martin Heinrich (D)

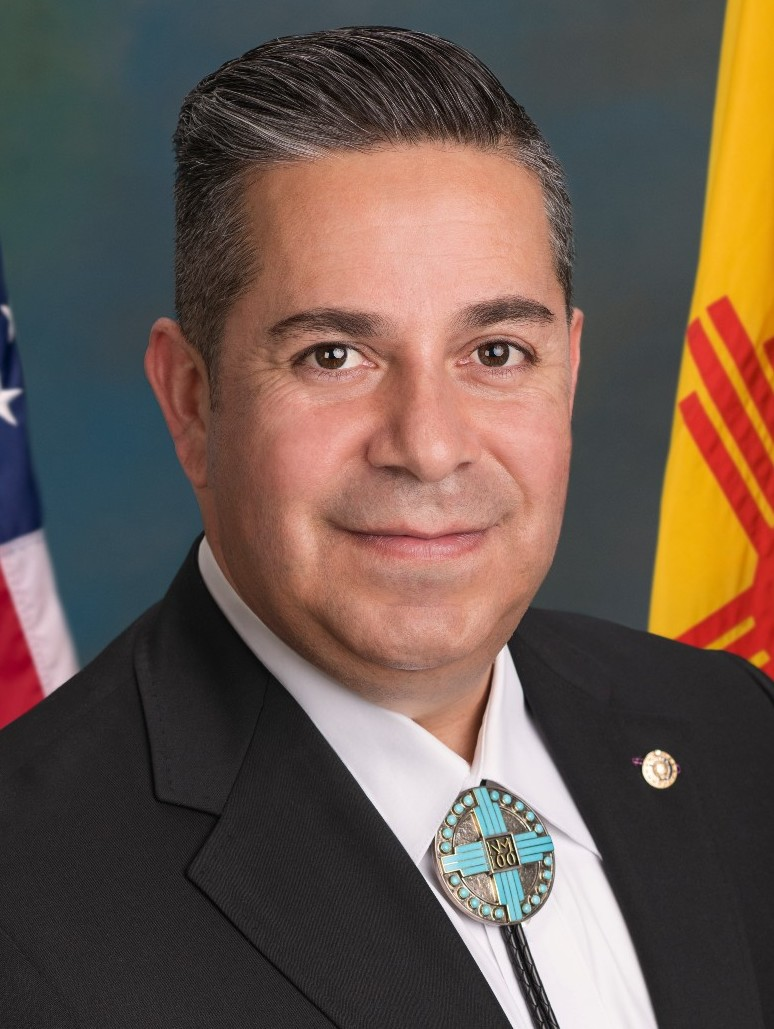
Ben Ray Luján (D)

(ordered by seniority)

New Mexico was admitted to the Union on January 6, 1912 and elects members of the United States Senate who belong to class 1 and class 2. The state's current U.S. senators are Democrats Martin Heinrich (since 2013) and Ben Ray Luján (since 2021). Pete Domenici was New Mexico's longest-serving senator (1973–2009).

== List of senators ==
Class 1 Class 1 senators belong to the electoral cycle that most recently had regular elections in 2006, 2012, 2018, and 2024. The next election will be in 2030.						C	Class 2 Class 2 senators belong to the electoral cycle that most recently had regular elections in 2008, 2014, 2020, and 2026. The next election will be in 2032.					
#	Senator	Party	Dates in office	Electoral history	T	C	T	Electoral history	Dates in office	Party	Senator	#
Vacant			Jan 6, 1912 – Mar 27, 1912	New Mexico became a state January 6, 1912, but didn't elect its U.S. senators until March 27.	1	62nd	1	New Mexico became a state January 6, 1912, but didn't elect its U.S. senators until March 27.	Jan 6, 1912 – Mar 27, 1912	Vacant		
1	Thomas B. Catron (Santa Fe)	Republican	Mar 27, 1912 – Mar 3, 1917	Elected in 1912. Retired.	1	62nd	1	Elected in 1912.	Mar 27, 1912 – Mar 3, 1921	Republican	Albert B. Fall (Three Rivers)	1
1	Thomas B. Catron (Santa Fe)	Republican	Mar 27, 1912 – Mar 3, 1917	Elected in 1912. Retired.	1	63rd	2	Elected in 1912 to next term, but Legislature invalided that election. Re-elected in 1913 to next term.	Mar 27, 1912 – Mar 3, 1921	Republican	Albert B. Fall (Three Rivers)	1
1	Thomas B. Catron (Santa Fe)	Republican	Mar 27, 1912 – Mar 3, 1917	Elected in 1912. Retired.	1	64th	2	Elected in 1912 to next term, but Legislature invalided that election. Re-elected in 1913 to next term.	Mar 27, 1912 – Mar 3, 1921	Republican	Albert B. Fall (Three Rivers)	1
2	Andrieus A. Jones (East Las Vegas)	Democratic	Mar 4, 1917 – Dec 20, 1927	Elected in 1916.	2	65th	2	Elected in 1912 to next term, but Legislature invalided that election. Re-elected in 1913 to next term.	Mar 27, 1912 – Mar 3, 1921	Republican	Albert B. Fall (Three Rivers)	1
2	Andrieus A. Jones (East Las Vegas)	Democratic	Mar 4, 1917 – Dec 20, 1927	Elected in 1916.	2	66th	3	Re-elected in 1918. Resigned to become U.S. Secretary of the Interior.	Mar 27, 1912 – Mar 3, 1921	Republican	Albert B. Fall (Three Rivers)	1
2	Andrieus A. Jones (East Las Vegas)	Democratic	Mar 4, 1917 – Dec 20, 1927	Elected in 1916.	2	67th	3		Mar 4, 1921 – Mar 11, 1921	Vacant		
2	Andrieus A. Jones (East Las Vegas)	Democratic	Mar 4, 1917 – Dec 20, 1927	Elected in 1916.	2	67th	3	Appointed to continue Fall's term. Elected in 1921 to finish Fall's term. Lost re-election.	Mar 11, 1921 – Mar 3, 1925	Republican	Holm O. Bursum (Socorro)	2
2	Andrieus A. Jones (East Las Vegas)	Democratic	Mar 4, 1917 – Dec 20, 1927	Re-elected in 1922. Died.	3	68th	3	Appointed to continue Fall's term. Elected in 1921 to finish Fall's term. Lost re-election.	Mar 11, 1921 – Mar 3, 1925	Republican	Holm O. Bursum (Socorro)	2
2	Andrieus A. Jones (East Las Vegas)	Democratic	Mar 4, 1917 – Dec 20, 1927	Re-elected in 1922. Died.	3	69th	4	Elected in 1924.	Mar 4, 1925 – Jun 24, 1933	Democratic	Sam G. Bratton (Albuquerque)	3
2	Andrieus A. Jones (East Las Vegas)	Democratic	Mar 4, 1917 – Dec 20, 1927	Re-elected in 1922. Died.	3	70th	4	Elected in 1924.	Mar 4, 1925 – Jun 24, 1933	Democratic	Sam G. Bratton (Albuquerque)	3
Vacant			Dec 20, 1927 – Dec 29, 1927		3	70th	4	Elected in 1924.	Mar 4, 1925 – Jun 24, 1933	Democratic	Sam G. Bratton (Albuquerque)	3
3	Bronson M. Cutting (Santa Fe)	Republican	Dec 29, 1927 – Dec 6, 1928	Appointed to continue Jones's term. Retired when elected successor qualified.	3	70th	4	Elected in 1924.	Mar 4, 1925 – Jun 24, 1933	Democratic	Sam G. Bratton (Albuquerque)	3
4	Octaviano Larrazolo (Albuquerque)	Republican	Dec 7, 1928 – Mar 3, 1929	Elected in 1928 to finish Jones's term. Retired due to illness.	3	70th	4	Elected in 1924.	Mar 4, 1925 – Jun 24, 1933	Democratic	Sam G. Bratton (Albuquerque)	3
5	Bronson M. Cutting (Santa Fe)	Republican	Mar 4, 1929 – May 6, 1935	Elected in 1928.	4	71st	4	Elected in 1924.	Mar 4, 1925 – Jun 24, 1933	Democratic	Sam G. Bratton (Albuquerque)	3
5	Bronson M. Cutting (Santa Fe)	Republican	Mar 4, 1929 – May 6, 1935	Elected in 1928.	4	72nd	5	Re-elected in 1930. Resigned to become a judge of the U.S. Court of Appeals.	Mar 4, 1925 – Jun 24, 1933	Democratic	Sam G. Bratton (Albuquerque)	3
5	Bronson M. Cutting (Santa Fe)	Republican	Mar 4, 1929 – May 6, 1935	Elected in 1928.	4	73rd	5	Re-elected in 1930. Resigned to become a judge of the U.S. Court of Appeals.	Mar 4, 1925 – Jun 24, 1933	Democratic	Sam G. Bratton (Albuquerque)	3
5	Bronson M. Cutting (Santa Fe)	Republican	Mar 4, 1929 – May 6, 1935	Elected in 1928.	4	73rd	5		Jun 24, 1933 – Oct 10, 1933	Vacant		
5	Bronson M. Cutting (Santa Fe)	Republican	Mar 4, 1929 – May 6, 1935	Elected in 1928.	4	73rd	5	Appointed to continue Bratton's term Elected in 1934 to finish Bratton's term.	Oct 10, 1933 – Jan 3, 1949	Democratic	Carl Hatch (Clovis)	4
5	Bronson M. Cutting (Santa Fe)	Republican	Mar 4, 1929 – May 6, 1935	Re-elected in 1934. Died.	5	74th	5	Appointed to continue Bratton's term Elected in 1934 to finish Bratton's term.	Oct 10, 1933 – Jan 3, 1949	Democratic	Carl Hatch (Clovis)	4
Vacant			May 6, 1935 – May 11, 1935		5	74th	5	Appointed to continue Bratton's term Elected in 1934 to finish Bratton's term.	Oct 10, 1933 – Jan 3, 1949	Democratic	Carl Hatch (Clovis)	4
6	Dennis Chávez (Albuquerque)	Democratic	May 11, 1935 – Nov 18, 1962	Appointed to continue Cutting's term. Elected in 1936 to finish Cutting's term.	5	74th	5	Appointed to continue Bratton's term Elected in 1934 to finish Bratton's term.	Oct 10, 1933 – Jan 3, 1949	Democratic	Carl Hatch (Clovis)	4
6	Dennis Chávez (Albuquerque)	Democratic	May 11, 1935 – Nov 18, 1962	Appointed to continue Cutting's term. Elected in 1936 to finish Cutting's term.	5	75th	6	Re-elected in 1936.	Oct 10, 1933 – Jan 3, 1949	Democratic	Carl Hatch (Clovis)	4
6	Dennis Chávez (Albuquerque)	Democratic	May 11, 1935 – Nov 18, 1962	Appointed to continue Cutting's term. Elected in 1936 to finish Cutting's term.	5	76th	6	Re-elected in 1936.	Oct 10, 1933 – Jan 3, 1949	Democratic	Carl Hatch (Clovis)	4
6	Dennis Chávez (Albuquerque)	Democratic	May 11, 1935 – Nov 18, 1962	Re-elected in 1940.	6	77th	6	Re-elected in 1936.	Oct 10, 1933 – Jan 3, 1949	Democratic	Carl Hatch (Clovis)	4
6	Dennis Chávez (Albuquerque)	Democratic	May 11, 1935 – Nov 18, 1962	Re-elected in 1940.	6	78th	7	Re-elected in 1942. Retired.	Oct 10, 1933 – Jan 3, 1949	Democratic	Carl Hatch (Clovis)	4
6	Dennis Chávez (Albuquerque)	Democratic	May 11, 1935 – Nov 18, 1962	Re-elected in 1940.	6	79th	7	Re-elected in 1942. Retired.	Oct 10, 1933 – Jan 3, 1949	Democratic	Carl Hatch (Clovis)	4
6	Dennis Chávez (Albuquerque)	Democratic	May 11, 1935 – Nov 18, 1962	Re-elected in 1946.	7	80th	7	Re-elected in 1942. Retired.	Oct 10, 1933 – Jan 3, 1949	Democratic	Carl Hatch (Clovis)	4
6	Dennis Chávez (Albuquerque)	Democratic	May 11, 1935 – Nov 18, 1962	Re-elected in 1946.	7	81st	8	Elected in 1948.	Jan 3, 1949 – Jan 3, 1973	Democratic	Clinton Anderson (Albuquerque)	5
6	Dennis Chávez (Albuquerque)	Democratic	May 11, 1935 – Nov 18, 1962	Re-elected in 1946.	7	82nd	8	Elected in 1948.	Jan 3, 1949 – Jan 3, 1973	Democratic	Clinton Anderson (Albuquerque)	5
6	Dennis Chávez (Albuquerque)	Democratic	May 11, 1935 – Nov 18, 1962	Re-elected in 1952.	8	83rd	8	Elected in 1948.	Jan 3, 1949 – Jan 3, 1973	Democratic	Clinton Anderson (Albuquerque)	5
6	Dennis Chávez (Albuquerque)	Democratic	May 11, 1935 – Nov 18, 1962	Re-elected in 1952.	8	84th	9	Re-elected in 1954.	Jan 3, 1949 – Jan 3, 1973	Democratic	Clinton Anderson (Albuquerque)	5
6	Dennis Chávez (Albuquerque)	Democratic	May 11, 1935 – Nov 18, 1962	Re-elected in 1952.	8	85th	9	Re-elected in 1954.	Jan 3, 1949 – Jan 3, 1973	Democratic	Clinton Anderson (Albuquerque)	5
6	Dennis Chávez (Albuquerque)	Democratic	May 11, 1935 – Nov 18, 1962	Re-elected in 1958. Died.	9	86th	9	Re-elected in 1954.	Jan 3, 1949 – Jan 3, 1973	Democratic	Clinton Anderson (Albuquerque)	5
6	Dennis Chávez (Albuquerque)	Democratic	May 11, 1935 – Nov 18, 1962	Re-elected in 1958. Died.	9	87th	10	Re-elected in 1960.	Jan 3, 1949 – Jan 3, 1973	Democratic	Clinton Anderson (Albuquerque)	5
Vacant			Nov 18, 1962 – Nov 30, 1962		9	87th	10	Re-elected in 1960.	Jan 3, 1949 – Jan 3, 1973	Democratic	Clinton Anderson (Albuquerque)	5
7	Edwin L. Mechem (Las Cruces)	Republican	Nov 30, 1962 – Nov 3, 1964	Appointed to continue Chávez's term. Lost election to finish term.	9	87th	10	Re-elected in 1960.	Jan 3, 1949 – Jan 3, 1973	Democratic	Clinton Anderson (Albuquerque)	5
7	Edwin L. Mechem (Las Cruces)	Republican	Nov 30, 1962 – Nov 3, 1964	Appointed to continue Chávez's term. Lost election to finish term.	9	88th	10	Re-elected in 1960.	Jan 3, 1949 – Jan 3, 1973	Democratic	Clinton Anderson (Albuquerque)	5
8	Joseph Montoya (Santa Fe)	Democratic	Nov 4, 1964 – Jan 3, 1977	Elected in 1964 to finish Chávez's term.	9	88th	10	Re-elected in 1960.	Jan 3, 1949 – Jan 3, 1973	Democratic	Clinton Anderson (Albuquerque)	5
8	Joseph Montoya (Santa Fe)	Democratic	Nov 4, 1964 – Jan 3, 1977	Elected to full term in 1964.	10	89th	10	Re-elected in 1960.	Jan 3, 1949 – Jan 3, 1973	Democratic	Clinton Anderson (Albuquerque)	5
8	Joseph Montoya (Santa Fe)	Democratic	Nov 4, 1964 – Jan 3, 1977	Elected to full term in 1964.	10	90th	11	Re-elected in 1966. Retired.	Jan 3, 1949 – Jan 3, 1973	Democratic	Clinton Anderson (Albuquerque)	5
8	Joseph Montoya (Santa Fe)	Democratic	Nov 4, 1964 – Jan 3, 1977	Elected to full term in 1964.	10	91st	11	Re-elected in 1966. Retired.	Jan 3, 1949 – Jan 3, 1973	Democratic	Clinton Anderson (Albuquerque)	5
8	Joseph Montoya (Santa Fe)	Democratic	Nov 4, 1964 – Jan 3, 1977	Re-elected in 1970. Lost re-election.	11	92nd	11	Re-elected in 1966. Retired.	Jan 3, 1949 – Jan 3, 1973	Democratic	Clinton Anderson (Albuquerque)	5
8	Joseph Montoya (Santa Fe)	Democratic	Nov 4, 1964 – Jan 3, 1977	Re-elected in 1970. Lost re-election.	11	93rd	12	Elected in 1972.	Jan 3, 1973 – Jan 3, 2009	Republican	Pete Domenici (Albuquerque)	6
8	Joseph Montoya (Santa Fe)	Democratic	Nov 4, 1964 – Jan 3, 1977	Re-elected in 1970. Lost re-election.	11	94th	12	Elected in 1972.	Jan 3, 1973 – Jan 3, 2009	Republican	Pete Domenici (Albuquerque)	6
9	Harrison Schmitt (Silver City)	Republican	Jan 3, 1977 – Jan 3, 1983	Elected in 1976. Lost re-election.	12	95th	12	Elected in 1972.	Jan 3, 1973 – Jan 3, 2009	Republican	Pete Domenici (Albuquerque)	6
9	Harrison Schmitt (Silver City)	Republican	Jan 3, 1977 – Jan 3, 1983	Elected in 1976. Lost re-election.	12	96th	13	Re-elected in 1978.	Jan 3, 1973 – Jan 3, 2009	Republican	Pete Domenici (Albuquerque)	6
9	Harrison Schmitt (Silver City)	Republican	Jan 3, 1977 – Jan 3, 1983	Elected in 1976. Lost re-election.	12	97th	13	Re-elected in 1978.	Jan 3, 1973 – Jan 3, 2009	Republican	Pete Domenici (Albuquerque)	6
10	Jeff Bingaman (Santa Fe)	Democratic	Jan 3, 1983 – Jan 3, 2013	Elected in 1982.	13	98th	13	Re-elected in 1978.	Jan 3, 1973 – Jan 3, 2009	Republican	Pete Domenici (Albuquerque)	6
10	Jeff Bingaman (Santa Fe)	Democratic	Jan 3, 1983 – Jan 3, 2013	Elected in 1982.	13	99th	14	Re-elected in 1984.	Jan 3, 1973 – Jan 3, 2009	Republican	Pete Domenici (Albuquerque)	6
10	Jeff Bingaman (Santa Fe)	Democratic	Jan 3, 1983 – Jan 3, 2013	Elected in 1982.	13	100th	14	Re-elected in 1984.	Jan 3, 1973 – Jan 3, 2009	Republican	Pete Domenici (Albuquerque)	6
10	Jeff Bingaman (Santa Fe)	Democratic	Jan 3, 1983 – Jan 3, 2013	Re-elected in 1988.	14	101st	14	Re-elected in 1984.	Jan 3, 1973 – Jan 3, 2009	Republican	Pete Domenici (Albuquerque)	6
10	Jeff Bingaman (Santa Fe)	Democratic	Jan 3, 1983 – Jan 3, 2013	Re-elected in 1988.	14	102nd	15	Re-elected in 1990.	Jan 3, 1973 – Jan 3, 2009	Republican	Pete Domenici (Albuquerque)	6
10	Jeff Bingaman (Santa Fe)	Democratic	Jan 3, 1983 – Jan 3, 2013	Re-elected in 1988.	14	103rd	15	Re-elected in 1990.	Jan 3, 1973 – Jan 3, 2009	Republican	Pete Domenici (Albuquerque)	6
10	Jeff Bingaman (Santa Fe)	Democratic	Jan 3, 1983 – Jan 3, 2013	Re-elected in 1994.	15	104th	15	Re-elected in 1990.	Jan 3, 1973 – Jan 3, 2009	Republican	Pete Domenici (Albuquerque)	6
10	Jeff Bingaman (Santa Fe)	Democratic	Jan 3, 1983 – Jan 3, 2013	Re-elected in 1994.	15	105th	16	Re-elected in 1996.	Jan 3, 1973 – Jan 3, 2009	Republican	Pete Domenici (Albuquerque)	6
10	Jeff Bingaman (Santa Fe)	Democratic	Jan 3, 1983 – Jan 3, 2013	Re-elected in 1994.	15	106th	16	Re-elected in 1996.	Jan 3, 1973 – Jan 3, 2009	Republican	Pete Domenici (Albuquerque)	6
10	Jeff Bingaman (Santa Fe)	Democratic	Jan 3, 1983 – Jan 3, 2013	Re-elected in 2000.	16	107th	16	Re-elected in 1996.	Jan 3, 1973 – Jan 3, 2009	Republican	Pete Domenici (Albuquerque)	6
10	Jeff Bingaman (Santa Fe)	Democratic	Jan 3, 1983 – Jan 3, 2013	Re-elected in 2000.	16	108th	17	Re-elected in 2002. Retired.	Jan 3, 1973 – Jan 3, 2009	Republican	Pete Domenici (Albuquerque)	6
10	Jeff Bingaman (Santa Fe)	Democratic	Jan 3, 1983 – Jan 3, 2013	Re-elected in 2000.	16	109th	17	Re-elected in 2002. Retired.	Jan 3, 1973 – Jan 3, 2009	Republican	Pete Domenici (Albuquerque)	6
10	Jeff Bingaman (Santa Fe)	Democratic	Jan 3, 1983 – Jan 3, 2013	Re-elected in 2006. Retired.	17	110th	17	Re-elected in 2002. Retired.	Jan 3, 1973 – Jan 3, 2009	Republican	Pete Domenici (Albuquerque)	6
10	Jeff Bingaman (Santa Fe)	Democratic	Jan 3, 1983 – Jan 3, 2013	Re-elected in 2006. Retired.	17	111th	18	Elected in 2008.	Jan 3, 2009 – Jan 3, 2021	Democratic	Tom Udall (Santa Fe)	7
10	Jeff Bingaman (Santa Fe)	Democratic	Jan 3, 1983 – Jan 3, 2013	Re-elected in 2006. Retired.	17	112th	18	Elected in 2008.	Jan 3, 2009 – Jan 3, 2021	Democratic	Tom Udall (Santa Fe)	7
11	Martin Heinrich (Albuquerque)	Democratic	Jan 3, 2013 – present	Elected in 2012.	18	113th	18	Elected in 2008.	Jan 3, 2009 – Jan 3, 2021	Democratic	Tom Udall (Santa Fe)	7
11	Martin Heinrich (Albuquerque)	Democratic	Jan 3, 2013 – present	Elected in 2012.	18	114th	19	Re-elected in 2014. Retired.	Jan 3, 2009 – Jan 3, 2021	Democratic	Tom Udall (Santa Fe)	7
11	Martin Heinrich (Albuquerque)	Democratic	Jan 3, 2013 – present	Elected in 2012.	18	115th	19	Re-elected in 2014. Retired.	Jan 3, 2009 – Jan 3, 2021	Democratic	Tom Udall (Santa Fe)	7
11	Martin Heinrich (Albuquerque)	Democratic	Jan 3, 2013 – present	Re-elected in 2018.	19	116th	19	Re-elected in 2014. Retired.	Jan 3, 2009 – Jan 3, 2021	Democratic	Tom Udall (Santa Fe)	7
11	Martin Heinrich (Albuquerque)	Democratic	Jan 3, 2013 – present	Re-elected in 2018.	19	117th	20	Elected in 2020.	Jan 3, 2021 – present	Democratic	Ben Ray Luján (Nambé)	8
11	Martin Heinrich (Albuquerque)	Democratic	Jan 3, 2013 – present	Re-elected in 2018.	19	118th	20	Elected in 2020.	Jan 3, 2021 – present	Democratic	Ben Ray Luján (Nambé)	8
11	Martin Heinrich (Albuquerque)	Democratic	Jan 3, 2013 – present	Re-elected in 2024.	20	119th	20	Elected in 2020.	Jan 3, 2021 – present	Democratic	Ben Ray Luján (Nambé)	8
11	Martin Heinrich (Albuquerque)	Democratic	Jan 3, 2013 – present	Re-elected in 2024.	20	120th	21	Re-elected in 2026.	Jan 3, 2021 – present	Democratic	Ben Ray Luján (Nambé)	8
11	Martin Heinrich (Albuquerque)	Democratic	Jan 3, 2013 – present	Re-elected in 2024.	20	121st	21	Re-elected in 2026.	Jan 3, 2021 – present	Democratic	Ben Ray Luján (Nambé)	8
To be determined in the 2030 election.					21	122nd	21	Re-elected in 2026.	Jan 3, 2021 – present	Democratic	Ben Ray Luján (Nambé)	8
To be determined in the 2030 election.					21	123rd	22	To be determined in the 2032 election.				

== See also ==
- Elections in New Mexico
- List of United States representatives from New Mexico
- New Mexico's congressional delegations
