= David L. Norvell =

American politician (1935–2023)

David Norvell

23rd Attorney General of New Mexico
- In office 1971–1975
- Governor: Bruce King
- Preceded by: James A. Maloney
- Succeeded by: Toney Anaya

Member of the New Mexico House of Representatives
- In office 1962–1970

Personal details
- Born: August 1, 1935 Kansas City, Missouri, U.S.
- Died: December 21, 2023 (aged 88) Albuquerque, New Mexico, U.S.
- Party: Democratic
- Education: Northeastern State University (BS); University of Oklahoma (JD)

David Lee Norvell (August 1, 1935 – December 21, 2023) was an American lawyer and politician who served as attorney general of New Mexico from 1971 to 1975.

== Early life and education ==
David Lee Norvell was born in Kansas City, Missouri, and was raised in Bartlesville, Oklahoma. In 1955, he received a Bachelor of Science degree from Northeastern State University in Tahlequah, Oklahoma and a Juris Doctor from the University of Oklahoma College of Law 1958.

== Career ==
Norvell served in the New Mexico House of Representatives from 1962 to 1970. In the House, he served as both majority floor leader (1967) and speaker of the House (1969). Norvell practiced law in both Clovis, New Mexico, and in Albuquerque from 1976. He later served on the New Mexico Racing Commission and New Mexico Gaming Control Board.

== Death ==
Norvell died in Albuquerque on December 21, 2023, at the age of 88.
