= Pete Domenici =

American politician (1932–2017)

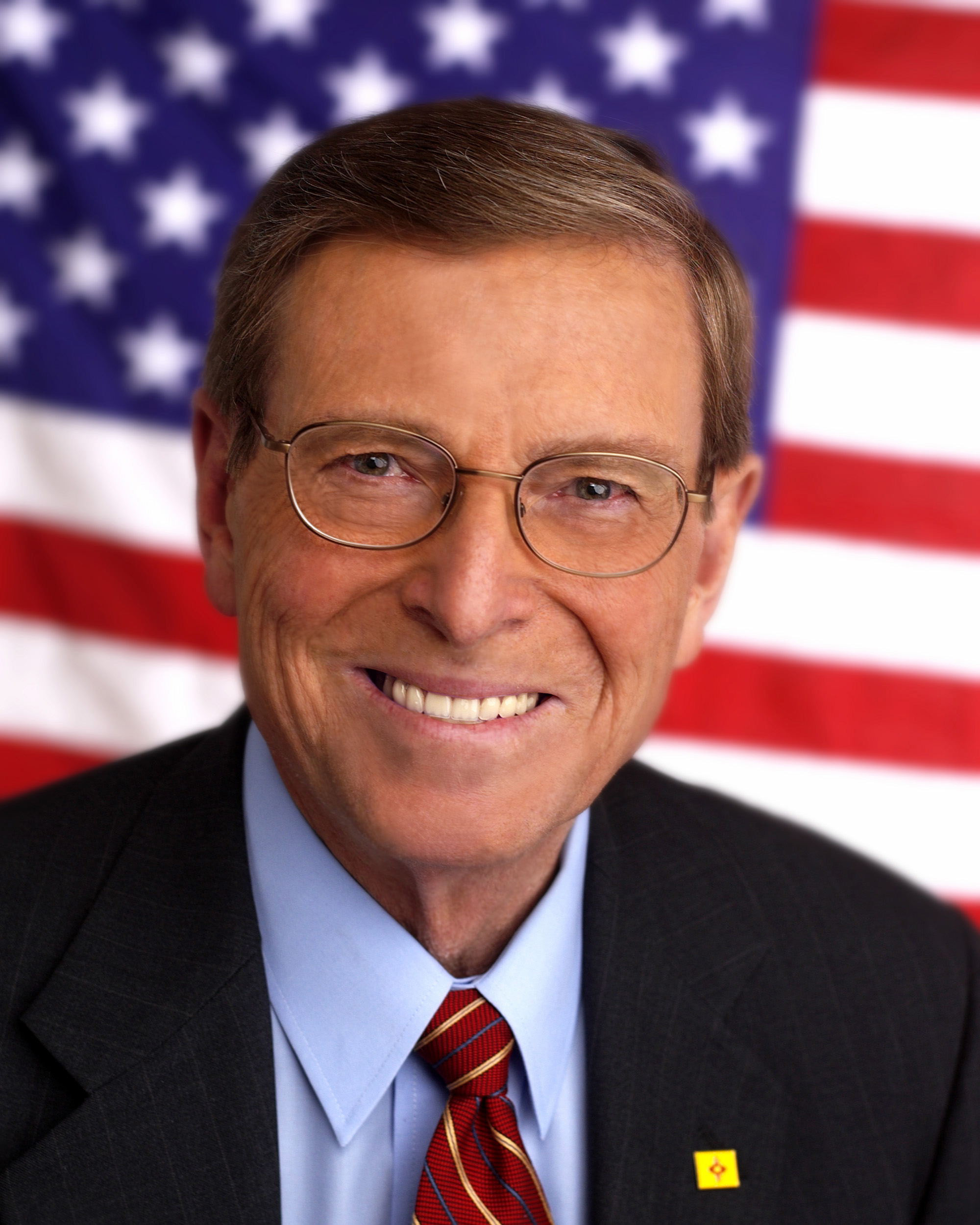

United States Senator from New Mexico
- In office January 3, 1973 – January 3, 2009
- Preceded by: Clinton P. Anderson
- Succeeded by: Tom Udall
Committee positions
Ranking Member of the Senate Energy Committee
In office January 3, 2007 – January 3, 2009
Preceded by	Jeff Bingaman
Succeeded by	Lisa Murkowski
Chair of the Senate Energy Committee
In office January 3, 2003 – January 3, 2007
Preceded by	Jeff Bingaman
Succeeded by	Jeff Bingaman
Chair of the Senate Budget Committee
In office January 3, 1995 – June 6, 2001
Preceded by	Jim Sasser
Succeeded by	Kent Conrad
In office January 3, 1981 – January 3, 1987
Preceded by	Fritz Hollings
Succeeded by	Lawton Chiles
Ranking Member of the Senate Budget Committee
In office January 3, 2001 – January 3, 2003
Preceded by	Frank Lautenberg
Succeeded by	Kent Conrad
In office January 3, 1987 – January 3, 1995
Preceded by	Lawton Chiles
Succeeded by	James Exon

Chairman of the Albuquerque City Commission
- In office October 16, 1967 – March 3, 1970
- Preceded by: Ralph Trigg
- Succeeded by: Charles E. Barnhart

Personal details
- Born: Pietro Vichi Domenici; May 7, 1932 Albuquerque, New Mexico, U.S.
- Died: September 13, 2017 (aged 85) Albuquerque, New Mexico, U.S.
- Party: Republican
- Spouse: Nancy Burk
- Children: 9, including Adam
- Education: University of Albuquerque; University of New Mexico (BA); University of Denver (LLB)
- Website: Senate website (archived)
- Domenici's voice Domenici introducing a bill to modernize the juvenile justice system. Recorded September 10, 1996

Pietro Vichi "Pete" Domenici (/doʊˈmɛnɪtʃi/ doh-MEN-ih-chee; May 7, 1932 – September 13, 2017) was an American attorney and politician who served as a United States senator from New Mexico from 1973 to 2009. A member of the Republican Party, he served six terms in the Senate, making him the longest-tenured U.S. Senator in the state's history. To date, Domenici is the last Republican to be elected to the Senate from New Mexico. He was succeeded by Democratic U.S. Representative Tom Udall.

During Domenici's tenure in the Senate, he advocated waterway usage fees, nuclear power and related causes. He received criticism for his environmental record and extramarital affair. Domenici chaired several key committees including the Senate Budget Committee and Senate Energy Committee.

== Early years ==
Domenici was born in Albuquerque, New Mexico, to Alda (née Vichi) and Cherubino Domenici, both of whom were born in Modena, Italy.

Growing up, Domenici worked in his father's grocery business after school. In 1950, he graduated from St. Mary's High School in Albuquerque. He spent two years at the College of St. Joseph on the Rio Grande (now the University of Albuquerque) before earning a degree in education at the University of New Mexico, Albuquerque in 1954, where he was a member of Sigma Alpha Epsilon fraternity.

After graduating, Domenici pitched one season for the Albuquerque Dukes, then a Class C Minor league baseball team. He also taught mathematics at Garfield Junior High in Albuquerque. Domenici earned his law degree at the University of Denver law school in 1958 and returned to practice law in Albuquerque.

== Political career ==
In 1966, Domenici successfully ran for a position on the Albuquerque City Commission and in 1968 was elected Commission Chairman (a post equivalent to that of mayor).

Domenici was the Republican nominee for governor in the 1970 New Mexico gubernatorial race, which he lost to Democrat and former state House Speaker Bruce King. King won the election with 148,835 votes (51 percent) to Domenici's 134,640 (46 percent).

=== Senate career ===
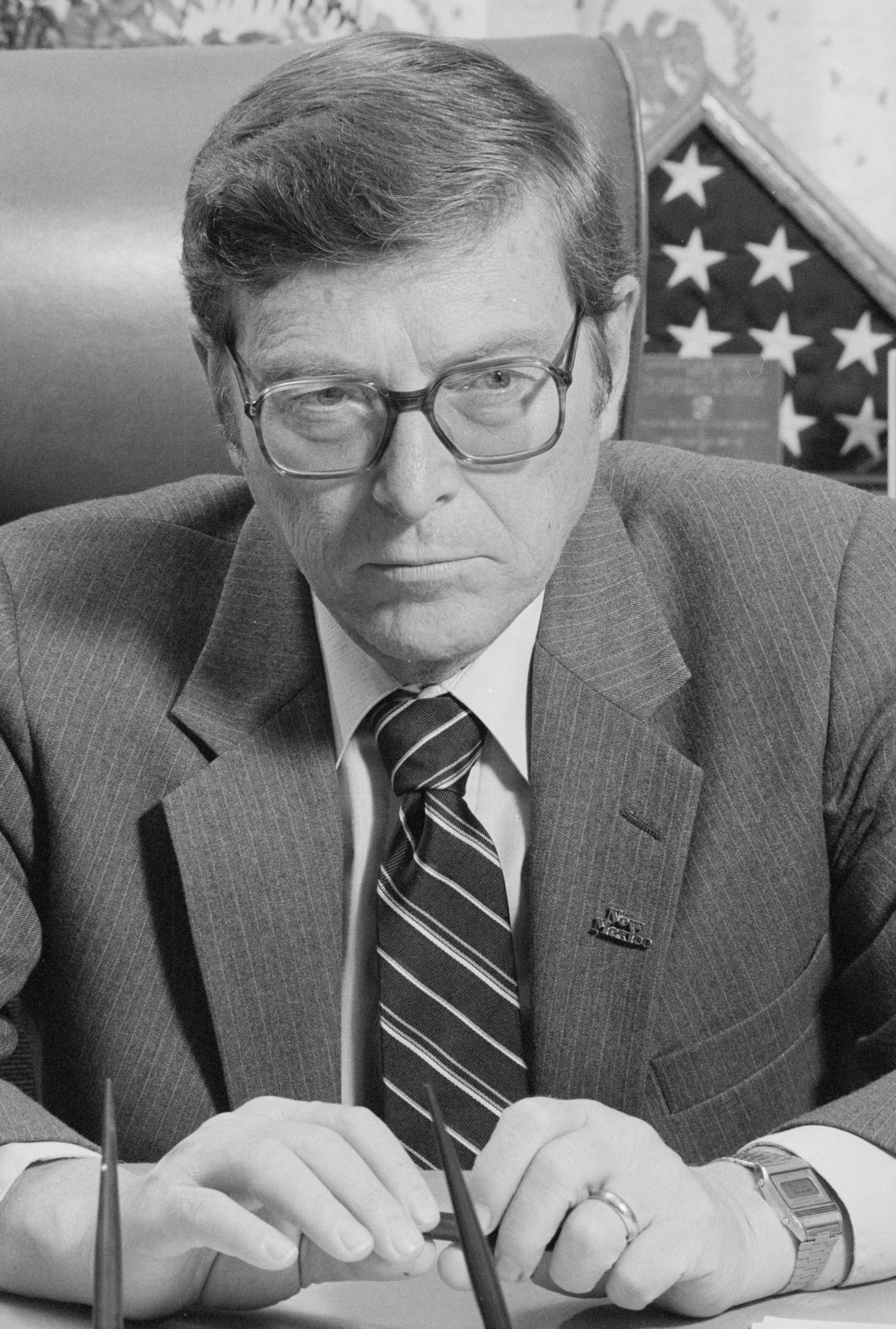
Domenici in 1983

In 1972, Domenici successfully ran for a position in the U.S. Senate and became the first New Mexico Republican to be elected to the position in 38 years. He was aided by Richard Nixon's landslide win over Democratic U.S. Senator George McGovern at the top of the ticket. Domenici polled 204,253 votes (54 percent) to 173,815 (46 percent) for Democratic state Representative Jack Daniels, a Hobbs realtor.

Domenici was subsequently re-elected in 1978, 1984, 1990, 1996, and 2002 and is to date the longest-serving senator in his state's history, having served in the legislative body for 36 years. At the time of his retirement, he was the ranking member of the United States Senate Committee on Energy and Natural Resources and the United States Senate Appropriations Subcommittee on Energy and Water Development. He was also a member of the U.S. Senate Committees on Appropriations and Indian Affairs, and served as Chairman and Ranking Minority Member of the Budget Committee. He advocated for the mentally ill, having pushed the Mental Health Parity Act of 1996.

Domenici voted in favor of the bill establishing Martin Luther King Jr. Day as a federal holiday and the Civil Rights Restoration Act of 1987 (as well as to override President Reagan's veto). Domenici also voted in favor of the nominations of Robert Bork and Clarence Thomas to the U.S. Supreme Court.

In 1998, Domenici voted to convict President Bill Clinton for perjury and obstruction of justice during his impeachment trial. He explained his vote:

What standard of conduct should we insist our President live up to? ... Do not underestimate, my friends, the corrupting and cynical signal we will send if we fail to enforce the highest standards of conduct on the most powerful man in the nation.

This was despite Domenici’s own adulterous affair at age 55 with 24-year-old Michelle Laxalt, daughter of his Senate colleague, Paul Laxalt. The affair, resulting in the birth of a son, would remain secret for decades.

==== Water fees ====
One of the first issues that Domenici concerned himself with was waterway usage fees, in spite of his state lacking any waterway capable of commercial traffic - although it did have a prominent railway industry. The idea behind a waterway usage fee was that the Army Corps of Engineers built dams and other expensive waterway projects, which the barge industry was able to use for free. In 1977, Domenici set himself to the task of enacting a waterway usage fee. After a long two-year battle with stiff lobbying on both sides, the waterway fee was finally passed along with a new lock and dam project (the rebuilding of Lock and Dam 26 at Alton, Illinois). Reporters attributed the passage of this fee in no small part to Domenici's legislative skill. The legislation was signed into law in 1978.

The issue greatly assisted Domenici in his home state, where the railroad industry was a significant player (railroads competed with barges, and they had long wanted to end the "free ride" issue). The railroads donated $40,000 to Domenici's campaign, and the barge industry gave a small sum to his opponent. He was reelected in 1978 with 53.4% of the vote over Democratic nominee Toney Anaya, a former New Mexico Attorney General who later became Governor. The 6.8% victory margin would be Domenici's closest election in his Senate career.

==== Environmental record ====
The organization Republicans for Environmental Protection singled out Domenici as "Worst in the Senate in 2006" on environmental issues. In addition to assigning Domenici a score of zero for his environmental voting record, the group issued him "environmental harm demerits" for what they saw as two particularly irresponsible acts: first, for spearheading efforts to include in federal budget legislation provisions for "speculative revenues from oil drilling in the Arctic National Wildlife Refuge; second, "for sponsoring and securing passage of S. 3711, the Gulf of Mexico Energy Security Act, which would perpetuate America's dangerous oil dependence, set a precedent for drilling in sensitive marine waters, and direct a disproportionate share of federal royalty revenues from a public resource to four states."

Domenici also received an exceptionally low environmental rating from the League of Conservation Voters, who claimed in 2003 that "[d]uring the last decade his voting record has become even more strikingly anti-environmental." The LCV went on to criticize Domenici for voting in 1995 "to allow mining companies to 'patent' (purchase) public lands in order to extract minerals from them, without environmental standards, for the ridiculously low 'price' of $5 an acre or less."

==== Nuclear power ====
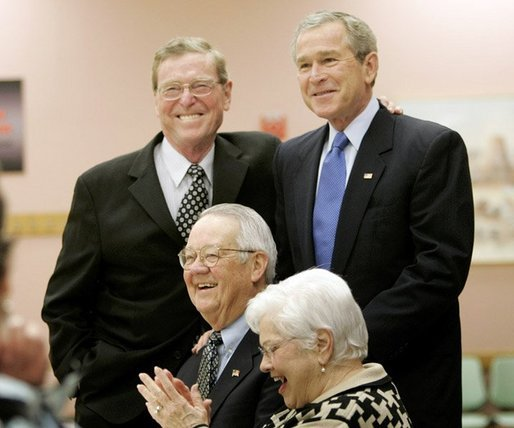
Domenici and President George W. Bush visit with breakfast guests at Bear Canyon Senior Center in Albuquerque, March 2005

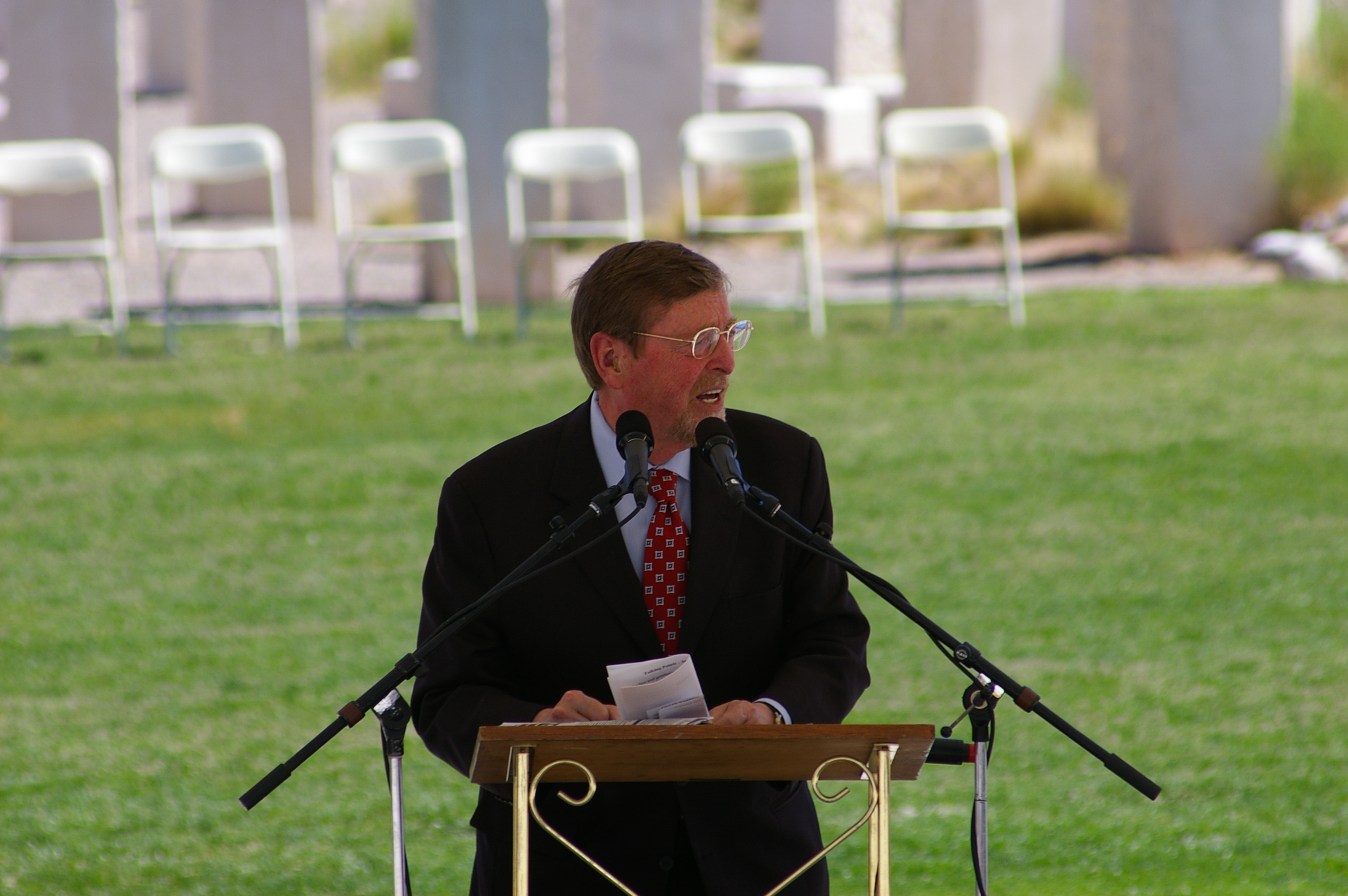
Domenici speaking at an Albuquerque Memorial Day event, May 2008

Domenici was an avid proponent of nuclear power and published two books on the subject: A Brighter Tomorrow: Fulfilling the Promise of Nuclear Energy (Lanham, Maryland: Rowman & Littlefield Publishers, 2004), which he wrote; and Advanced Nuclear Technologies — Hearing Before the Committee on Appropriations, U.S. Senate (Collingdale, Pennsylvania: Diane Publishing Company, 1999), which he edited.

Committee assignments

- Committee on Appropriations
  - Subcommittee on Commerce, Justice, Science, and Related Agencies
  - Subcommittee on Defense
  - Subcommittee on Energy and Water Development (Ranking Member)
  - Subcommittee on Homeland Security
  - Subcommittee on Interior, Environment, and Related Agencies
  - Subcommittee on Transportation, Housing and Urban Development, and Related Agencies
- Committee on Energy and Natural Resources (Ranking Member)
  - Subcommittee on Energy (Ex Officio)
  - Subcommittee on National Parks (Ex Officio)
  - Subcommittee on Public Lands and Forests (Ex Officio)
  - Subcommittee on Water and Power (Ex Officio)
- Committee on Homeland Security and Governmental Affairs
  - Ad Hoc Subcommittee on Disaster Recovery
  - Ad Hoc Subcommittee on State, Local, and Private Sector Preparedness and Integration
  - Permanent Subcommittee on Investigations
  - Subcommittee on Federal Financial Management, Government Information, Federal Services, and International Security
- Committee on the Budget
- Committee on Indian Affairs

=== Department of Justice controversy ===
2006 dismissal of U.S. attorneys controversy
- Timeline
- Summary of attorneys
- Congressional hearings
- List of dismissed attorneys
- All related articles

Prior to the 2006 midterm election Domenici called and allegedly pressured then-United States Attorney for the District of New Mexico David Iglesias to speed up indictments in a federal corruption investigation that involved at least one former Democratic state senator. When Iglesias said an indictment would not be handed down until at least December, Domenici said "I'm very sorry to hear that" — and the line went dead. Domenici's telephone manners were the subject of a later article in The Albuquerque Journal, which quoted numerous other sources whom Domenici had treated rudely by hanging up after making a point or receiving an unsatisfactory answer. Iglesias was fired a little over one month later by the Bush Administration. In a March 2007 statement, Domenici admitted making such a call. House Judiciary Committee Chairman John Conyers, D-Mich., issued subpoenas to require Iglesias and three other ousted U.S. attorneys to testify before Congress.

Domenici later admitted calling Iglesias, though Domenici claimed he never used the word "November" when he called Iglesias about an ongoing Albuquerque courthouse corruption case. Domenici denied trying to influence Iglesias, and hired lawyer K. Lee Blalack II to represent him.

According to the Justice Department, Domenici called the Department and demanded Iglesias be replaced on four occasions.

According to The Washington Post, on the day of the firing (December 7, 2006) William Kelley, a deputy to then White House Counsel Harriet Miers, said in an email that Domenici's chief of staff was "happy as a clam" about the Iglesias firing. A week later, a Justice Department email to the White House counsel stated: "Domenici is going to send over names tomorrow (not even waiting for Iglesias's body to cool)." On April 24, 2008, Domenici was admonished by the Senate Ethics Committee for "inappropriately" contacting in 2006 one of the nine U.S. attorneys later fired by President Bush.

The committee found "no substantial evidence" that Domenici tried to influence attorney David Iglesias when he contacted him to inquire about the status of a 2006 investigation into corruption charges on a state Democratic official. A possible indictment could have buoyed the re-election hopes of Rep. Heather Wilson (R-N.M.), who was seeking to replace Domenici when the senator retired. Iglesias charged that Domenici and Wilson were pressuring him to wrap up the investigation before that November's elections, a violation of ethics rules. The Ethics Committee said that Domenici's phone call to Iglesias, in advance of an upcoming election, "created an appearance of impropriety that reflected unfavorably on the Senate".

In July 2010, Department of Justice prosecutors closed the two-year investigation without filing charges after determining that the firing was not criminal, saying "Evidence did not demonstrate that any prosecutable criminal offense was committed with regard to the removal of David Iglesias. The investigative team also determined that the evidence did not warrant expanding the scope of the investigation beyond the removal of Iglesias." Domenici said of the closed investigation, "The Justice Department has now confirmed what I have always said and believed: I never attempted to interfere with any government investigation. I am glad that this matter has concluded."

== Electoral history ==
1972 U.S. Senate election in New Mexico
Primary election
Party	Candidate	Votes	%
Republican	Pete Domenici	37,337	63.25
Republican	David Cargo	12,522	21.21
Republican	Others	9,171	15.54
Total votes		59,030	100.00
General election
Republican	Pete Domenici	204,253	54.03
Democratic	Jack Daniels	173,815	45.97
Total votes		378,068	100.00
Republican gain from Democratic			

1978 U.S. Senate election in New Mexico
Party	Candidate	Votes	%
Republican	Pete Domenici (incumbent)	183,442	53.41
Democratic	Toney Anaya	160,045	46.59
Total votes		343,487	100.00
Republican hold			

1984 U.S. Senate election in New Mexico
Party	Candidate	Votes	%
Republican	Pete Domenici (incumbent)	361,371	71.9
Democratic	Judith Pratt	141,253	28.1
Write-in		10	0.00
Total votes		502,634	100.00
Republican hold			

1990 U.S. Senate election in New Mexico
Party	Candidate	Votes	%
Republican	Pete Domenici (incumbent)	296,712	72.95
Democratic	Tom Benavidez	110,033	27.05
Total votes		406,745	100.00
Republican hold			

1996 U.S. Senate election in New Mexico
Primary election
Party	Candidate	Votes	%
Republican	Pete Domenici (incumbent)	69,394	100.00
Total votes		69,394	100.00
General election
Republican	Pete Domenici (incumbent)	357,171	64.73
Democratic	Art Trujillo	164,356	29.78
Green	Abraham J. Gutmann	24,230	4.39
Libertarian	Bruce M. Bush	6,064	1.10
Total votes		551,821	100.00
Republican hold			

2002 U.S. Senate election in New Mexico
Primary election
Party	Candidate	Votes	%
Republican	Pete Domenici (incumbent)	91,898	99.93
Republican	Orlin G. Cole (write-in)	62	0.07
Total votes		91,960	100.00
General election
Republican	Pete Domenici (incumbent)	314,193	65.04
Democratic	Gloria Tristani	168,863	34.96
Total votes		483,056	100.00
Republican hold			

== Life after politics ==
On October 4, 2007, Domenici announced his decision not to seek re-election to the Senate in 2008 for health reasons (specifically, frontotemporal lobar degeneration). His seat was won by Democrat Tom Udall.

After leaving the Senate, Domenici served as a senior fellow for the Bipartisan Policy Center. Domenici and former OMB director and CBO director Dr. Alice Rivlin chaired a Debt Reduction Task Force sponsored by the Bipartisan Policy Center. The task force was announced at a joint press conference on January 26, 2010, in Washington. The task force began its work in February 2010 and, led by Domenici, released a report on November 17, 2010 on ways to address and reduce the national debt and deficit.

The Domenici Institute, which aims to continue "Domenici's legacy of service to the state of New Mexico", bears his name.

== Personal life ==
After graduating from law school in 1958, Domenici married Nancy Burk. Together, the Domenicis had two sons and six daughters (Lisa, Peter, Nella, Clare, David, Nanette, and twins Paula and Helen). One of his daughters has schizophrenia; this reportedly influenced his decision to become a strong supporter of legislation providing for parity in insurance coverage for mental illness. Helen ran for the Maryland House of Delegates in 2018 as a Republican nominee in District 19, but did not win the general election. Nella, a hedge fund manager, was the Republican Party nominee in the 2024 United States Senate election in New Mexico.

During the 1970s, Domenici fathered a child, Adam Laxalt, with Michelle Laxalt (1954–2023), a young Republican staffer and lobbyist and the daughter of Domenici's then-Senate colleague, Nevada Republican Paul Laxalt; this fact was kept secret until 2013. In 2013, Domenici, then 80, acknowledged the affair and his son, saying he was "very sorry" for his behavior. Adam Laxalt ran for Nevada Attorney General in the 2014 election and defeated Democrat Ross Miller. Laxalt was the Republican nominee for Governor of Nevada in the 2018 election, losing to Steve Sisolak, and the Republican nominee for Senator in the 2022 midterms, losing to Catherine Cortez Masto.

=== Death ===
Domenici died on September 13, 2017, at the age of 85, at the University of New Mexico Hospital in Albuquerque, New Mexico, from complications that resulted from abdominal surgery. His funeral was held on the morning of September 16 in Albuquerque.

== Bibliography ==
- "A Brighter Tomorrow: Fulfilling the Promise of Nuclear Energy" (Lanham, Maryland: Rowman & Littlefield Publishers, 2004. ISBN 978-0742541894)
- "Advanced Nuclear Technologies — Hearing Before the Committee on Appropriations, U.S. Senate" (Collingdale, Pennsylvania: D I A N E Publishing Company, 1999. ISBN 978-0756702601), which he edited.

== See also ==
- Energy Policy Act of 2005, sponsored by Senator Domenici and Representative Joe Barton.
- New Mexico State University's Domenici Institute.
- List of federal political sex scandals in the United States

Political offices
Preceded by Ralph Trigg	Mayor of Albuquerque; 1967–1970	Succeeded by Charles E. Barnhart
Party political offices
Preceded by David Cargo	Republican nominee for Governor of New Mexico; 1970	Succeeded by Joe Skeen
Preceded by Anderson Carter	Republican nominee for U.S. Senator from New Mexico (Class 2); 1972, 1978, 1984, 1990, 1996, 2002	Succeeded by Steve Pearce
U.S. Senate
Preceded by Clinton P. Anderson	U.S. Senator (Class 2) from New Mexico; 1973–2009; Served alongside: Joseph Montoya, Harrison Schmitt, Jeff Bingaman	Succeeded by Tom Udall
Preceded by Hiram Fong	Ranking Member of the Senate Aging Committee; 1977–1981	Succeeded by Lawton Chiles
Preceded by Fritz Hollings	Chair of the Senate Budget Committee; 1981–1987	Succeeded by Lawton Chiles
Preceded by Lawton Chiles	Ranking Member of the Senate Budget Committee; 1987–1995	Succeeded by J. James Exon
Preceded by Jim Sasser	Chair of the Senate Budget Committee; 1995–2001	Succeeded by Kent Conrad
Preceded by Frank Lautenberg	Ranking Member of the Senate Budget Committee; 2001	Succeeded by Kent Conrad
Preceded by Kent Conrad	Chair of the Senate Budget Committee; 2001	Succeeded by Kent Conrad
Preceded by Kent Conrad	Ranking Member of the Senate Budget Committee; 2001–2003	Succeeded by Kent Conrad
Preceded by Jeff Bingaman	Chair of the Senate Energy Committee; 2003–2007	Succeeded by Jeff Bingaman
Preceded by Jeff Bingaman	Ranking Member of the Senate Energy Committee; 2007–2009	Succeeded by Lisa Murkowski
