= Elias Lee Francis =

Elias Lee Francis may refer to:

- Elias Lee Francis II (1913–2001), Lieutenant Governor of New Mexico from 1967 to 1971
- Elias Lee Francis III (1945–2003), a Laguna Pueblo-Anishinaabe poet, educator, and founder of the Wordcraft Circle of Native Writers and Storytellers.
