= 1994 New Mexico gubernatorial election =

- November 8, 1994
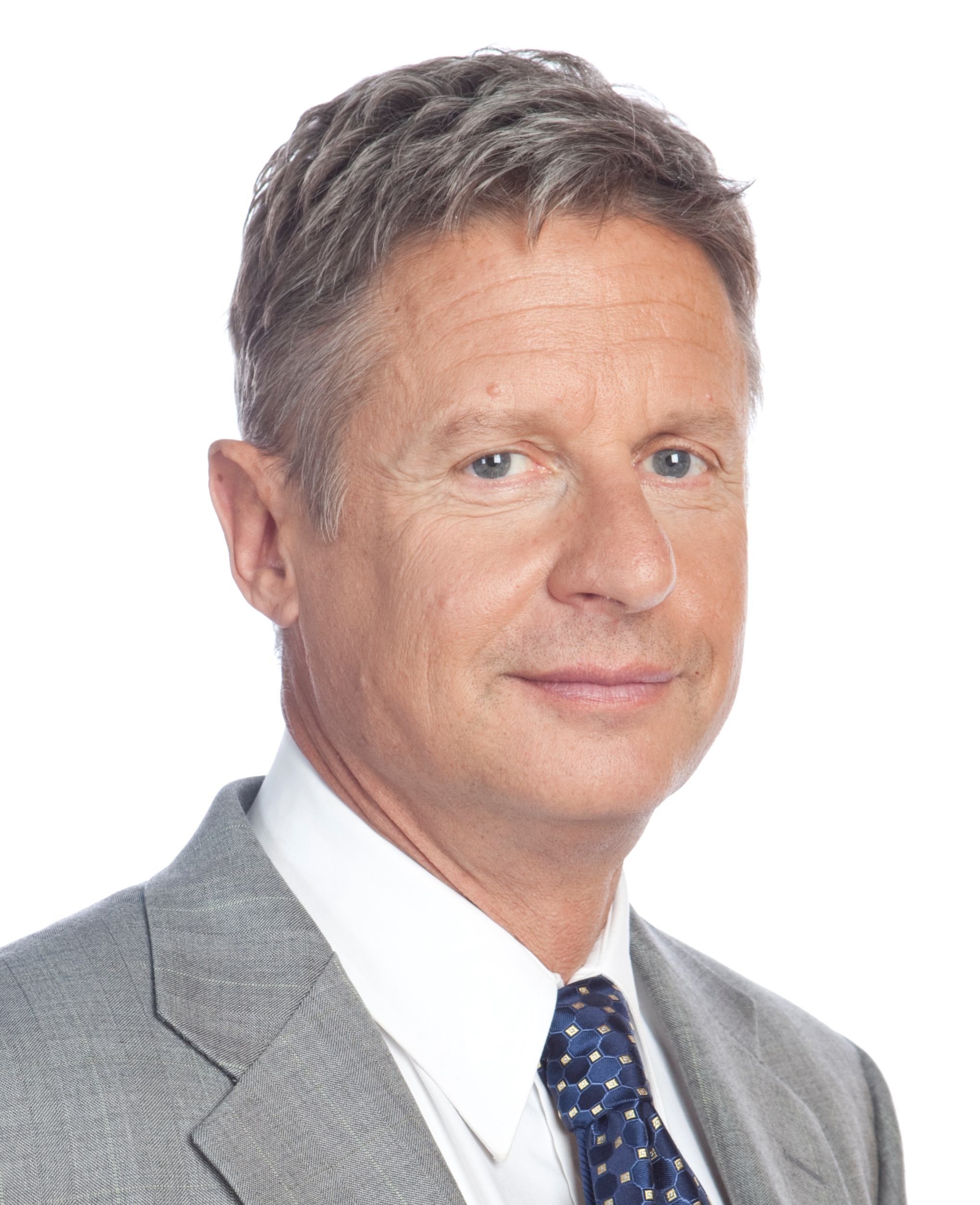

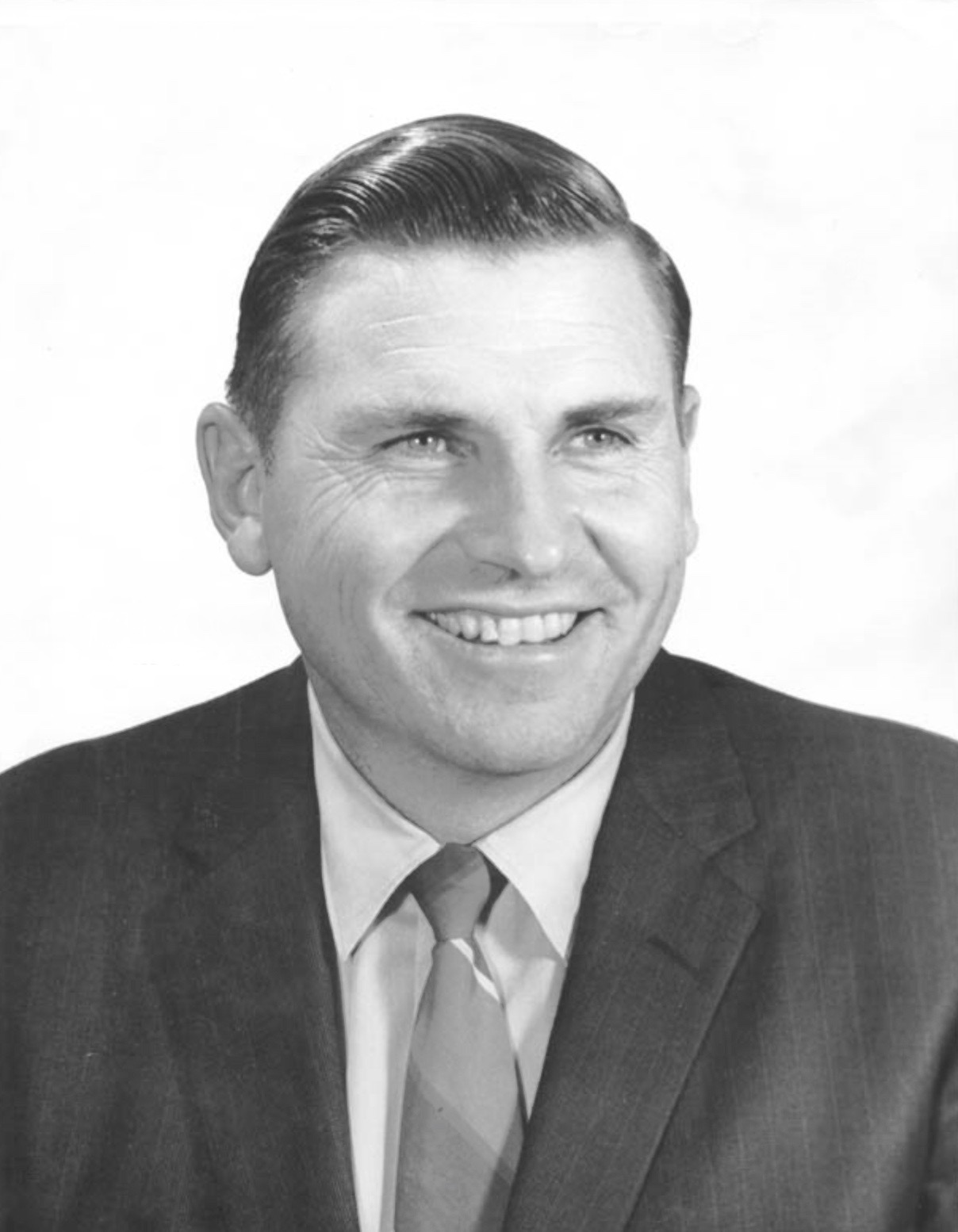

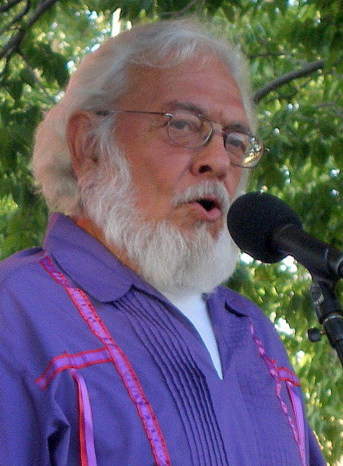
Nominee	Gary Johnson	Bruce King	Roberto Mondragón
Party	Republican	Democratic	Green
Running mate	Walter Bradley	Patricia A. Madrid	Steven Schmidt
Popular vote	232,945	186,686	47,990
Percentage	49.81%	39.92%	10.26%
- County results Johnson: 40–50% 50–60% 60–70% King: 40–50% 50–60%
Governor before election
Bruce King
Democratic
Elected Governor
Gary Johnson
Republican

The 1994 New Mexico gubernatorial election was held on November 8, 1994, for the four-year term beginning on January 1, 1995. Candidates for governor and lieutenant governor ran on a ticket as running mates.

Incumbent Democrat Bruce King ran for a fourth term with Patricia Madrid as a running mate, losing to Republican nominees Gary Johnson, a businessman, and Walter Bradley, a former state senator. Former Lieutenant Governor Roberto Mondragón ran with Steven Schmidt as the nominees of the Green Party, receiving 10.4 percent of the vote.

The election was marked by the surprising rise of Republican Gary Johnson, the 41-year-old owner of one of the state's largest construction companies. Johnson, who had never before held elected office, upset a crowded Republican primary field by a margin of fewer than 1,300 votes. With the state's non-Republicans split between the centrist King and progressive Mondragón, King failed to gain a majority and Johnson won the election with 49.8% of the vote.

This is the last time a governor of New Mexico lost re-election. This was one of four gubernatorial elections where an incumbent Democrat was defeated in 1994.

== Primary election ==
=== Democratic Party ===
King faced a tough renomination campaign, being challenged by incumbent Lieutenant Governor Casey Luna, who had a falling out with King in 1993 over King's refusal to give Luna a larger role in King's administration. Former New Mexico Commissioner of Public Lands Jim Baca also challenged King.

==== Candidates ====
- Jim Baca, former Director of the U.S. Bureau of Land Management and former New Mexico Commissioner of Public Lands
- Bruce King, incumbent Governor
- Casey Luna, incumbent Lieutenant Governor

==== Results ====
Democratic primary results
Party	Candidate	Votes	%
Democratic	Bruce King (incumbent)	76,039	38.38%
Democratic	Casey Luna	71,364	36.45%
Democratic	Jim Baca	48,401	24.72%
Total votes		195,804	100.00%

=== Republican Party ===
==== Candidates ====
- David F. Cargo, former Governor (1967–71) and former State Representative
- Dick Cheney, State Representative from Farmington
- John Dendahl, former New Mexico Secretary of Economic Development and Tourism
- Gary Johnson, businessman

===== Declined =====
- Manuel Lujan Jr., former U.S. Representative from Albuquerque (1969–89) and U.S. Secretary of the Interior (1989–93)

==== Campaign ====
Cheney ran on a platform highlighting cracking down on violent crime, repealing the gasoline tax, and lowering public spending. During the campaign, he controversially changed his legal name from Richard to "Dick". Opponents including John Dendahl stated that people voting in the polls would confuse Cheney with the former Secretary of Defense Dick Cheney from Wyoming, improving his chances of winning the primary. Public polling after the change showed that his numbers increased significantly.

At the state convention, Cheney received 49% of the vote against 29% for Dendahl and 22% for Johnson.

==== Results ====
June 7, 1994 Republican primary results
Party	Candidate	Votes	%
Republican	Gary Johnson	32,091	34.48%
Republican	Dick Cheney	30,811	33.10%
Republican	John Dendahl	18,007	19.35%
Republican	David F. Cargo	12,105	13.01%
Republican	Keith Russell Judd (write-in)	57	0.06%
Total votes		93,071	100.00%

== General election ==
=== Candidates ===
- Gary Johnson, businessman (Republican)
- Bruce King, incumbent Governor (Democratic)
- Roberto Mondragón, former Lieutenant Governor (Green)

=== Campaign ===
Bruce King, the Democratic three-term incumbent (Note: Non-consecutive terms), began the general election with the most funding and name recognition. King was a career politician who had first been elected to the Santa Fe County Commission in 1954, when Gary Johnson was just one year old. King also had the support of the Gold Boot Club, a business-backed political coalition that channeled thousands of dollars to his campaign.

King's quest for an unprecedented fourth term faced obstacles from the left and the right. From the left, King was challenged by Green Party nominee Roberto Mondragón. Mondragón was a populist former Democrat, who had served as Lieutenant Governor from 1971 to 1975 and in the state House from 1979 to 1983. Mondragón had a knack for appealing to both progressive whites and working-class Hispanics, and attacked King for his cushy relationships with big business.

Gary Johnson was the nominee of New Mexico's Republican Party, a statewide party that had won just one gubernatorial election since 1970. Johnson faced the challenge of keeping together his Republican base while appealing to independents and Democrats frustrated with King. Johnson campaigned as a political outsider and self-made entrepreneur. In college, Johnson had worked as a door-to-door handyman, a business that gradually expanded into Big J Enterprises. By 1999, the company employed over 1,000 people and was worth several million dollars. Johnson avoided then-divisive social issues like abortion and gay rights, and focused his campaign on pocketbook issues like taxes and the state budget. Johnson touted his experience in the business world of balancing budgets while growing his company, and promised to bring that experience to state government.

In November, Gary Johnson won the election with just under 50% of the vote, while King got almost 40% and Mondragón pulled in just over 10%.

=== Polling ===
Poll source	Date(s) administered	Sample size	Margin of error	Bruce King (D)	Gary Johnson (R)	Other	Undecided
Santa Fe New Mexican	November 3, 1994	—	—	34%	46%	—	—
Albuquerque Journal	October 23, 1994	—	—	35%	40%	—	—

=== Results ===
1994 New Mexico gubernatorial election
Party	Candidate	Votes	%	±%
Republican	Gary Johnson	232,945	49.81%	+4.66%
Democratic	Bruce King (incumbent)	186,686	39.92%	−14.68%
Green	Roberto Mondragón	47,990	10.26%	
Plurality		46,259	9.89%	
Total votes		467,621	100.00%	
Republican gain from Democratic		Swing	+19.34%	

=== Results by county ===
Johnson was the first Republican since Edwin L. Mechem in 1956 to carry Sandoval County. As of 2022, only Sandoval County and Bernalillo County have backed the winner in each gubernatorial election going back to 1990. Johnson was also the first Republican since David Cargo in 1966 to win Valencia County.

County	Gary Johnson Republican		Bruce King Democratic		Roberto Mondragón Green		Margin		Total votes cast
County	#	%	#	%	#	%	#	%	Total votes cast
Bernalillo	81,732	52.82%	57,131	36.92%	15,861	10.25%	24,601	15.90%	154,724
Catron	992	66.71%	408	27.44%	87	5.85%	584	39.27%	1,487
Chaves	9,606	60.45%	5,449	34.29%	835	5.25%	4,157	26.16%	15,890
Cibola	2,387	41.39%	2,731	47.36%	649	11.25%	-344	-5.96%	5,767
Colfax	1,982	41.69%	2,242	47.16%	530	11.15%	-260	-5.47%	4,754
Curry	6,721	64.39%	3,377	32.35%	340	3.26%	3,344	32.04%	10,438
De Baca	482	44.55%	498	46.03%	102	9.43%	-16	-1.48%	1,082
Doña Ana	17,560	53.79%	12,142	37.19%	2,945	9.02%	5,418	16.60%	32,647
Eddy	8,549	55.46%	6,129	39.76%	737	4.78%	2,420	15.70%	15,415
Grant	4,059	43.50%	4,484	48.05%	789	8.45%	-425	-4.55%	9,332
Guadalupe	366	16.34%	1,253	55.94%	621	27.72%	-632 (Note: Margin over Mondragón)	-28.22%	2,240
Harding	280	43.55%	307	47.74%	56	8.71%	-27	-4.20%	643
Hidalgo	940	49.09%	846	44.18%	129	6.74%	94	4.91%	1,915
Lea	8,616	66.68%	3,934	30.44%	372	2.88%	4,682	36.23%	12,922
Lincoln	2,850	54.11%	2,080	39.49%	337	6.40%	770	14.62%	5,267
Los Alamos	5,379	59.61%	3,043	33.72%	602	6.67%	2,336	25.89%	9,024
Luna	2,956	54.40%	2,087	38.41%	391	7.20%	869	15.99%	5,434
McKinley	4,750	35.77%	7,748	58.35%	781	5.88%	-2,998	-22.58%	13,279
Mora	581	23.63%	1,377	56.00%	501	20.37%	-796	-32.37%	2,459
Otero	7,921	59.89%	4,579	34.62%	725	5.48%	-3,342	-25.27%	13,225
Quay	1,886	50.12%	1,574	41.83%	303	8.05%	312	8.29%	3,763
Rio Arriba	2,381	23.95%	5,770	58.03%	1,792	18.02%	-3,389	-34.08%	9,943
Roosevelt	2,925	60.12%	1,745	35.87%	195	4.01%	1,180	24.25%	4,865
San Juan	16,343	61.53%	8,491	31.97%	1,729	6.51%	7,852	29.56%	26,563
San Miguel	1,789	21.44%	4,935	59.14%	1,620	19.42%	-3,146	-37.70%	8,344
Sandoval	11,228	53.95%	7,670	36.85%	1,915	9.20%	3,558	17.10%	20,813
Santa Fe	10,701	29.44%	18,006	49.54%	7,638	21.02%	-7,305	-20.10%	36,345
Sierra	2,390	61.31%	1,273	32.66%	235	6.03%	1,117	28.66%	3,898
Socorro	2,441	42.01%	2,737	47.11%	632	10.88%	-296	-5.09%	5,810
Taos	2,221	27.64%	3,668	45.64%	2,147	26.72%	-1,447	-18.01%	8,036
Torrance	1,786	43.56%	1,964	47.90%	350	8.54%	-178	-4.34%	4,100
Union	903	54.46%	678	40.89%	77	4.64%	225	13.57%	1,658
Valencia	7,242	46.61%	6,330	40.74%	1,967	12.66%	912	5.87%	15,539
Total	232,945	49.81%	186,686	39.92%	47,990	10.26%	46,259	9.89%	467,621

==== Counties that flipped from Democratic to Republican ====
- Bernalillo
- Catron
- Curry
- Doña Ana
- Eddy
- Hidalgo
- Luna
- Quay
- Roosevelt
- Sandoval
- Union
- Valencia

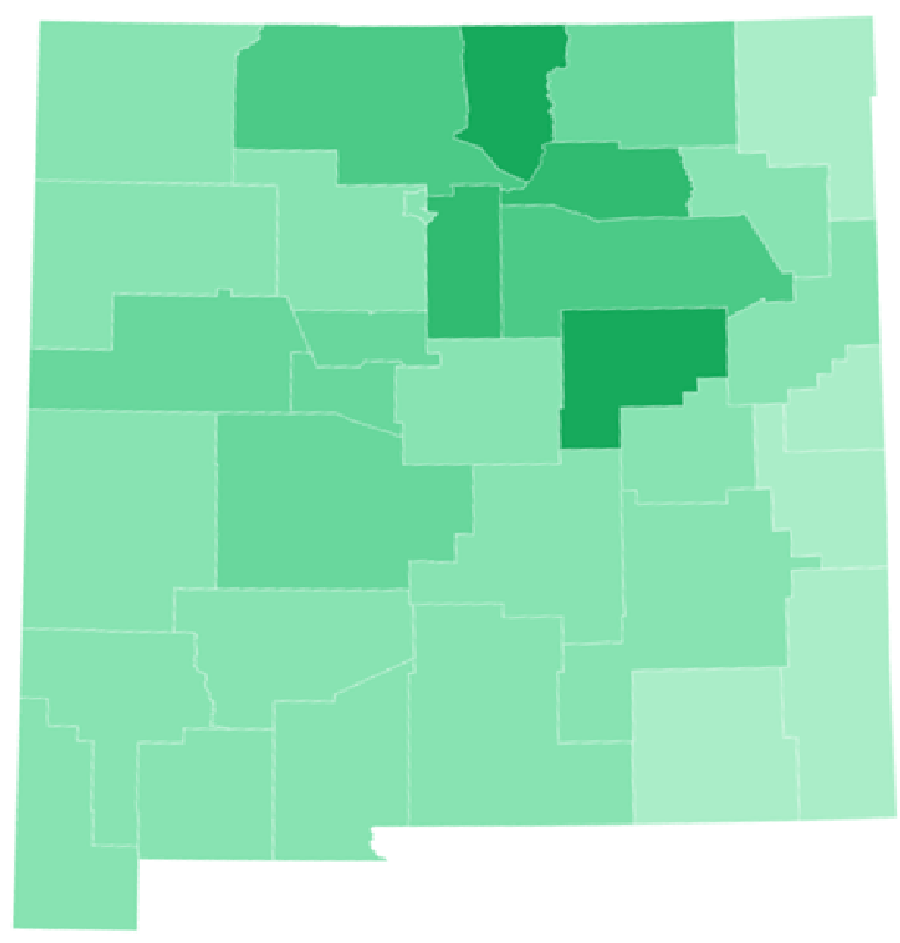
Mondragón's performance by county Legend: 25-30%; 20-25%; 15-20%; 10-15%; 5-10%; 0-5%
