= Paula Gunn Allen =

American poet

- Paula Gunn Allen (2007)
- Born: Paula Marie Francis; October 24, 1939; Cubero, New Mexico
- Died: May 29, 2008 (aged 68); Fort Bragg, California
- Education: University of Oregon, University of New Mexico
- Occupations: Poet, novelist
- Writing career
- Literary movement: Native American Renaissance

Paula Gunn Allen (October 24, 1939 – May 29, 2008) was an American poet, literary critic, activist, professor, and novelist. Of mixed-race European-American, Arab-American, and Native American descent, she identified with her mother's people, the Laguna Pueblo. Gunn Allen wrote numerous essays, stories and poetry with Native American and feminist themes, and two biographies of Native American women. She edited four collections of Native American traditional stories and contemporary writing.

In addition to her poetry and fiction, in 1986 she published the book, The Sacred Hoop: Recovering the Feminine in American Indian Traditions, in which she posited that Europeans had de-emphasized the role of women in their accounts of Native American cultures because of their own biases, as they were from patriarchal societies.

== Biography ==
Paula Marie Francis was born on October 24, 1939 in Cubero, New Mexico, a Spanish-Mexican land grant village bordering the Laguna Pueblo reservation. Of mixed Scottish American, Lebanese-American, and Laguna descent, Allen always identified most closely with the Laguna, among whom she spent part of her childhood. She was not enrolled in any Native nation.

She was one of five children born to Ethel Gottlieb Francis, who came from the Keres Pueblo people, and Elias Lee Francis II. Her Lebanese-American father owned a local store, the Cubero Trading Company, and later served as the lieutenant governor of New Mexico from 1967 to 1970. Her parents were both musicians, and her brother, Lee Francis, went on to be a poet, storyteller, and educator.

Allen first went to a mission school and graduated in 1957 from a boarding school called the "Sisters of Charity" located in Albuquerque. She first took an interest in writing in high school after discovering the work of Gertrude Stein.

She briefly attended the Colorado Women's College, then received a BA in English in 1966 and an MFA in creative writing in 1968 from the University of Oregon. At the University of Oregon, she studied under poet Ralph Salisbury, who claimed to be Cherokee and would have a heavy influence on Allen. Allen also credits N. Scott Momaday's House Made of Dawn with restoring her sense of Native identity and alleviating a serious depressive episode while she worked on her master's degree.

In 1975, she earned a PhD at the University of New Mexico, where she worked as a professor and began research on tribal religions. As a student at the University of New Mexico, Allen reached out to a poetry professor, Robert Creeley, for poetic advice. He directed her to the work of Charles Olson, Allen Ginsberg, and Denise Levertov, who all had strong influences on her work.

In the 1980s, Allen was a fellow at the Stanford Humanities Institute, where she helped coordinate a weekly women's workshop.

Allen taught at Fort Lewis College in Colorado, the College of San Mateo, San Diego State University, San Francisco State University, the University of New Mexico, Albuquerque, the University of California, Berkeley, and the University of California, Los Angeles. She taught at UCLA from 1990 to 1999 as a professor of the English department and the UCLA American Indian Studies Center.

== Anthropological writings ==
Based on her own experiences and her study of Indigenous cultures, Paula Gunn Allen wrote The Sacred Hoop: Recovering the Feminine in American Indian Traditions (1986), published on Beacon Press. The book argued that the dominant cultural view of Native American societies is biased and that European explorers and colonizers understood Native Peoples through the patriarchal lens. Gunn described the central role women played in many Native American cultures, including roles in political leadership, which were either downplayed or missed entirely by explorers and scholars from male-dominated European cultures. Allen presented the argument that most Native Americans at the time of European contact were matrifocal and egalitarian with only a small percentage reflecting the European patriarchal pattern.

Allen's arguments and research were criticized by more mainstream scholars, as well as by author and critic Gerald Vizenor, who accused her of "a simple reversal of essentialism". The American Indian Movement ("AIM") has itself been criticized by feminists as being sexist. In spite of this, Allen's book and subsequent work has been influential in feminist and women's studies, encouraging other feminist readings of Native American cultures and literature, both by mainstream feminists, or in related streams such as Indigenous feminism.

== Literary career ==
Allen is well known as a novelist, poet and short story writer. Her work drew heavily on the Pueblo tales of Grandmother Spider and the Corn Maiden. It is noted for its strong political connotations. Critics have noted that Leslie Marmon Silko, also of Laguna descent, also draws on these traditional tales.

Her novel, The Woman Who Owned The Shadows (1983), features the woman Ephanie Atencio, the mixed-blood daughter of a mixed-blood mother who struggles with social exclusion and the obliteration of self.

As a poet, Allen published a collection of more than 30 years of work: Life Is a Fatal Disease: Collected Poems 1962-1995, judged to be her most successful. Allen's work is often categorized as belonging to the Native American Renaissance, but the author rejects the label.

== Awards ==
- 1967: Julia Burgess Prize for Poetry, University of Oregon
- 1978: Creative Writing Award, National Endowment for the Arts
- 1984-1985: Fellowship grant, Ford Foundation
- 1990: Susan Koppelman Award, Popular and American Culture Associations
- 1990: Native American Literature Prize, University of California, Santa Cruz
- 1990: American Book Award, Before Columbus Foundation
- 1991: Vesta Award for Essay Writing, Woman's Building
- 1992: Award for Literature, Southern California Women for Understanding
- 1999: Hubbell Medal for Lifetime Achievement, Modern Language Association
- 2001: Lifetime Achievement Award, Native Writers' Circle of the Americas
- 2007: Writing Fellowship, Lannan Literary Awards

== Personal life ==
Allen's father, E. Lee Francis, was a Lebanese American and her mother, was Scottish-American and Laguna Pueblo. One of Allen's sisters, Carol Lee Sanchez, was a Laguna writer. She was also related to Leslie Marmon Silko.

Allen was in two different marriages and divorced both times. From 1981-1986, she lived in a committed relationship with American poet and author, Judy Grahn.

Two of Allen's children preceded her in death, Fuad Ali Allen, and Eugene John Brown. Son Fuad Ali Allen died in 1972 and her other son Eugene John Brown died in 2001. She was survived by two children, Lauralee Brown and Suleiman Allen.

== Bibliography ==
- The Woman Who Owned The Shadows (1983), novel

=== Poetry ===
- America the Beautiful: The Final Poems of Paula Gunn Allen (2010)
- Life is a Fatal Disease: Collected Poems 1962-1995 (1997)
- Skins and Bones: Poems 1979-1987 (1988)
- Shadow Country (1982)
- A Cannon Between My Knees (1981)
- Star Child: Poems (1981)
- Coyote's Daylight Trip (1978)
- Blind Lion Poems (The Blind Lion) (1974)

=== Academic ===
- Off the Reservation: Reflections on Boundary-Busting Border-Crossing Loose Canons (1998)
- Womanwork: Bridges: Literature across Cultures McGraw–Hill (1994)
- Grandmothers of the Light: A Medicine Women's Sourcebook (1991)
- The Sacred Hoop: Recovering the Feminine in American Indian Traditions (1986)
- Studies in American Indian Literature: Critical Essays and Course Designs (1983)

=== Biography ===
- Pocahontas: Medicine Woman, Spy, Entrepreneur, Diplomat (2004)
- As Long As the Rivers Flow: The Stories of Nine Native Americans (1996)

=== Edited collections and anthologies ===
- Hozho: Walking in Beauty: Short Stories by American Indian Writers (2001)
- Song of the Turtle: American Indian Literature, 1974-1994 (1996)
- Voice of the Turtle: American Indian Literature, 1900-1970 (1994)
- Spider Woman's Granddaughters: Traditional Tales and Contemporary Writing by Native American Women (1989)

=== Anthology contributions ===
- The Serpent's Tongue: Prose, Poetry, and Art of the New Mexican Pueblos, ed. Nancy Wood. (1997)
- Living the Spirit: A Gay American Indian Anthology, ed. Will Roscoe. (1988)
