= Richard Cheney (disambiguation) =

Dick Cheney (1941–2025) was the vice president of the United States from 2001 to 2009.

Richard Cheney or Richard Cheyney may also refer to:

- Richard Cheney (New Mexico politician) (born 1937), an American politician and a former Republican member of the New Mexico House of Representatives
- Richard Cheyney (1513–1579), an English bishop of Gloucester
