= Floros =

Floros is a surname. Notable people with the surname include:

- Constantin Floros (born 1930), Greek-German musicologist
- Jason Floros (born 1990), Australian cricketer
- John D. Floros, Greek-American food scientist and academic administrator
