= Roberto Mondragón =

American politician (1940–2026)

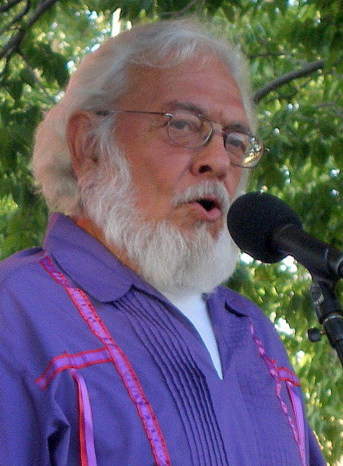

21st and 23rd Lieutenant Governor of New Mexico
- In office January 1, 1979 – January 1, 1983
- Governor: Bruce King
- Preceded by: Robert Ferguson
- Succeeded by: Mike Runnels
- In office January 1, 1971 – January 1, 1975
- Governor: Bruce King
- Preceded by: Elias Francis
- Succeeded by: Robert Ferguson

Personal details
- Born: July 27, 1940 Anton Chico, New Mexico, U.S.
- Died: January 7, 2026 (aged 85) Española, New Mexico, U.S.
- Party: Democratic (before 1994; 1997–2026); Green (1994–1997)

Roberto A. Mondragón (July 27, 1940 – January 7, 2026) was an American politician, musician and activist.

== Political career ==
Mondragón was the Green Party nominee for governor of New Mexico in 1994, receiving 10.4% of the vote (47,080 votes), and coming third, behind winner Gary Johnson and incumbent Democratic candidate Bruce King. Prior to this, he served as the 21st and 23rd lieutenant governor of New Mexico from 1971 to 1975 and from 1979 to 1983, and as a state representative. He had served as special water projects coordinator for the New Mexico state engineer's office and the Interstate Stream Commission. Mondragón later returned to the Democratic Party.

== Creative output ==
Mondragón had the minor role 'Milagro Townsperson' in 1988 film The Milagro Beanfield War.

He recorded two albums in the late 1970s and early 1980s, Que Cante Mondragón and Amigo. One of his early recordings is "Mi Carrito Paseado", a humorous, Spanglish, homage to a less than reliable automobile.

== Personal life and death ==
Mondragón was born on July 27, 1940. He was a partner in Aspectos Culturales, a non-profit, Santa Fe–based firm dedicated to maintaining Hispanic heritage.

Mondragón died on January 7, 2026, at the age of 85.

== See also ==
- List of minority governors and lieutenant governors in the United States

Party political offices
First	Green nominee for Governor of New Mexico; 1994	Vacant Title next held by David Bacon
Political offices
Preceded by Elias Francis	Lieutenant Governor of New Mexico; 1971–1975	Succeeded by Robert Ferguson
Preceded by Robert Ferguson	Lieutenant Governor of New Mexico; 1979–1983	Succeeded by Mike Runnels
