= James Strickler =

American politician (born 1954)

Member of the New Mexico House of Representatives from the 2nd district
- In office January 2007 – December 31, 2022
- Preceded by: Richard Cheney
- Succeeded by: Mark Duncan

Personal details
- Born: June 23, 1954 (age 72) Lockhart, Texas, U.S.
- Party: Republican
- Profession: Assistant superintendent

James R.J. Strickler (born June 23, 1954, in Lockhart, Texas) is an American politician and a Republican member of the New Mexico House of Representatives representing District 2 from January 2007 to December 2022.

== Elections ==
- 2012 Strickler was unopposed for both the June 5, 2012 Republican Primary, winning with 1,227 votes and the November 6, 2012 General election, winning with 6,924 votes.
- 2006 When District 2 Republican Representative Richard Cheney left the Legislature, Strickler was unopposed for the June 6, 2006 Republican Primary, winning with 1,125 votes and won the November 7, 2006 General election with 3,905 votes (62.5%) against Democratic nominee Alice Slaven-Emond.
- 2008 Strickler and his returning 2006 Democratic opponent Slaven-Emond were both unopposed for their June 8, 2008 primaries, setting up a rematch; Strickler won the November 4, 2008 General election with 6,120 votes (63.8%) against Slaven-Emond.
- 2010 Strickler was unopposed for both the June 1, 2010 Republican Primary, winning with 1,880 votes and the November 2, 2010 General election, winning with 5,935 votes.
