= Mike Runnels =

American politician from New Mexico

24th Lieutenant Governor of New Mexico
- In office January 1, 1983 – January 1, 1987
- Governor: Toney Anaya
- Preceded by: Roberto Mondragón
- Succeeded by: Jack L. Stahl

Personal details
- Born: September 11, 1945 Magnolia, Arkansas, U.S.
- Died: February 5, 2015 (aged 69) Ruidoso, New Mexico, U.S.
- Party: Democratic
- Relations: Harold L. Runnels (father)
- Education: Colorado College (BA); University of Texas at Austin (JD)

Michael L. Runnels (September 11, 1945 – February 5, 2015) was an American politician and lawyer.

== Early life and education ==
Born in Magnolia, Arkansas, to Harold and Dorothy Runnels, he grew up in Lovington, New Mexico, and graduated from Lovington High School. Runnels received his bachelor's degree Colorado College and a Juris Doctor from the University of Texas School of Law.

== Career ==
Runnels served on the Santa Fe City Council from 1976 to 1980 and then as district attorney from 1993 to 2000. He ran unsuccessfully in 1986 and 2000 for his father's congressional seat. From 1983 to 1987, Runnels served as the 24th lieutenant governor of New Mexico as a Democrat.

== Personal life ==
Runnels died at his home in Ruidoso, New Mexico.

Political offices
Preceded by Roberto Mondragón	Lieutenant Governor of New Mexico; 1983-1987	Succeeded by Jack L. Stahl
