= 1986 New Mexico gubernatorial election =

- November 4, 1986
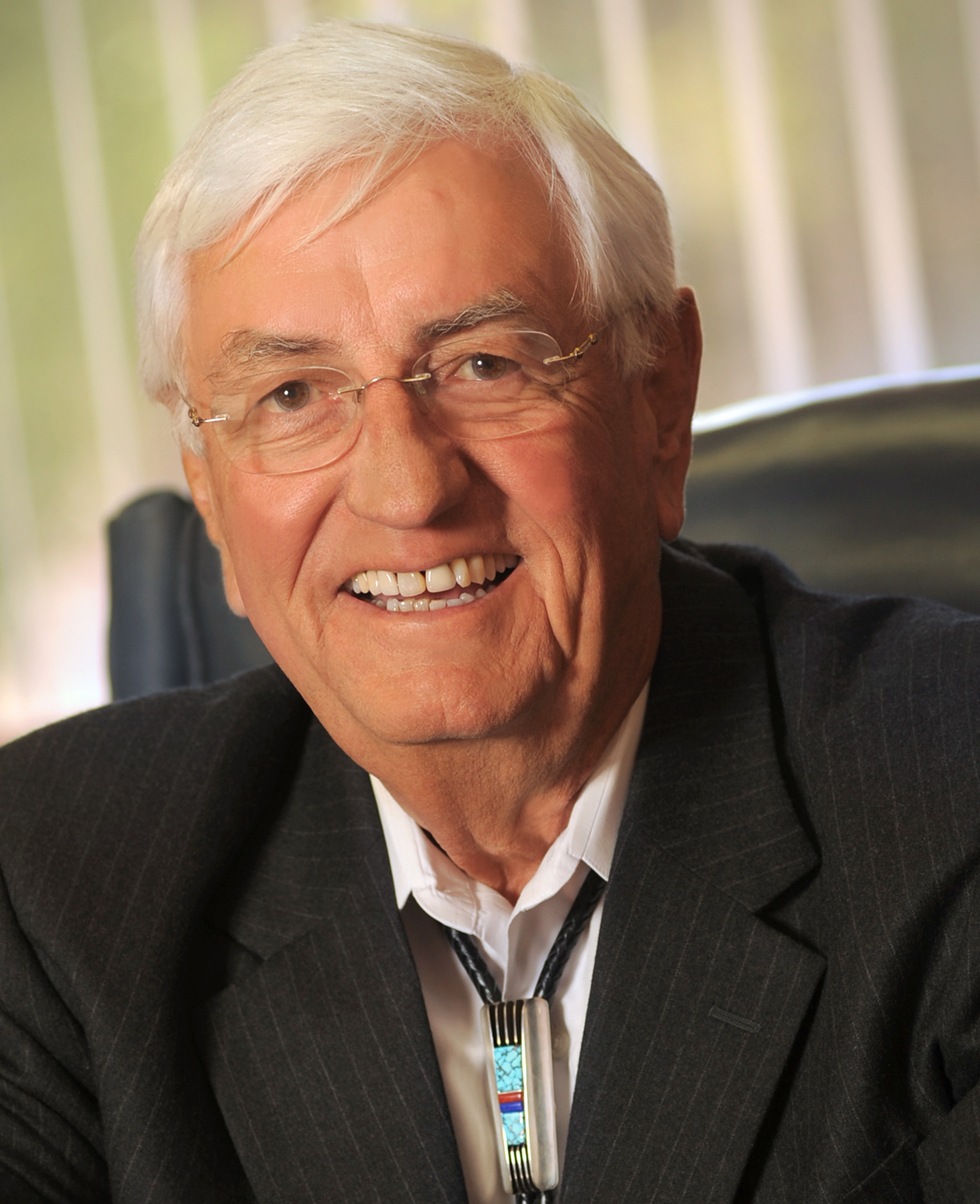

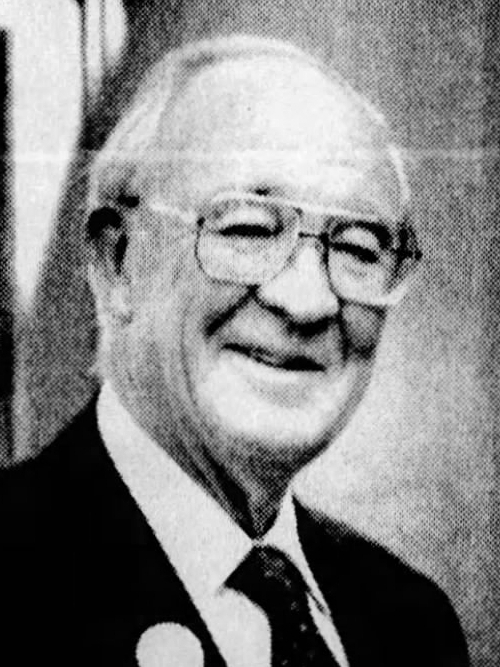
Nominee	Garrey Carruthers	Ray Powell
Party	Republican	Democratic
Popular vote	209,455	185,378
Percentage	53.05%	46.95%
- County results Carruthers: 50–60% 60–70% 70–80% Powell: 50–60% 60–70%
Governor before election
Toney Anaya
Democratic
Elected Governor
Garrey Carruthers
Republican

The 1986 New Mexico gubernatorial election took place on November 4, 1986, in order to elect the governor of New Mexico. Due to term limits, incumbent Democratic governor Toney Anaya was ineligible to seek a second term as governor. This was the last time until 2022, that the state elected a governor of the same party as the sitting president.

== Primary election ==
=== Democratic primary ===
Ray Powell was unopposed in the Democratic primary.

=== Republican primary ===
The Republican primary was won by former New Mexico Republican Party chair Garrey Carruthers, who defeated five other candidates.

==== Results ====
Republican primary results
Party	Candidate	Votes	%
Republican	Garrey Carruthers	27,671	31.05%
Republican	Joseph H. Mercer	23,560	26.44%
Republican	Colin R. McMillan	19,807	22.23%
Republican	Frank M. Bond	10,619	11.92%
Republican	Paul F. Becht	6,566	7.37%
Republican	William Jay Loomis Jr.	884	0.99%
Total votes		89,107	100.00%

== General election ==
=== Results ===
1986 New Mexico gubernatorial election
Party	Candidate	Votes	%	±%
Republican	Garrey Carruthers	209,455	53.05%	+6.02%
Democratic	Ray Powell	185,378	46.95%	−6.02%
Majority		24,077	6.10%	
Total votes		394,833	100.00%	
Republican gain from Democratic		Swing	+12.04%	

=== Results by county ===
County	Garrey Carruthers Republican		Ray Powell Democratic		Margin		Total votes cast
County	#	%	#	%	#	%	Total votes cast
Bernalillo	66,820	53.68%	57,656	46.32%	9,164	7.36%	124,476
Catron	814	63.89%	460	36.11%	354	27.79%	1,274
Chaves	10,788	63.80%	6,121	36.20%	4,667	27.60%	16,909
Cibola	2,491	48.46%	2,649	51.54%	-158	-3.07%	5,140
Colfax	1,997	46.17%	2,328	53.83%	-331	-7.65%	4,325
Curry	5,742	59.53%	3,904	40.47%	1,838	19.05%	9,646
De Baca	548	52.09%	504	47.91%	44	4.18%	1,052
Doña Ana	17,343	60.80%	11,183	39.20%	6,160	21.59%	28,526
Eddy	7,771	50.48%	7,622	49.52%	149	0.97%	15,393
Grant	3,605	46.11%	4,214	53.89%	-609	-7.79%	7,819
Guadalupe	791	43.44%	1,030	56.56%	-239	-13.12%	1,821
Harding	320	60.04%	213	39.96%	107	20.08%	533
Hidalgo	995	59.30%	683	40.70%	312	18.59%	1,678
Lea	8,813	65.64%	4,613	34.36%	4,200	31.28%	13,426
Lincoln	3,049	71.57%	1,211	28.43%	1,838	43.15%	4,260
Los Alamos	4,729	59.32%	3,243	40.68%	1,486	18.64%	7,972
Luna	3,122	58.60%	2,206	41.40%	916	17.19%	5,328
McKinley	4,514	39.56%	6,897	60.44%	-2,383	-20.88%	11,411
Mora	965	44.47%	1,205	55.53%	-240	-11.06%	2,170
Otero	6,728	60.94%	4,313	39.06%	2,415	21.87%	11,041
Quay	1,924	57.11%	1,445	42.89%	479	14.22%	3,369
Rio Arriba	3,197	33.77%	6,269	66.23%	-3,072	-32.45%	9,466
Roosevelt	2,702	59.90%	1,809	40.10%	893	19.80%	4,511
San Juan	13,184	61.24%	8,345	38.76%	4,839	22.48%	21,529
San Miguel	2,510	35.04%	4,654	64.96%	-2,144	-29.93%	7,164
Sandoval	6,521	48.50%	6,924	51.50%	-403	-3.00%	13,445
Santa Fe	10,800	39.51%	16,537	60.49%	-5,737	-20.99%	27,337
Sierra	2,463	67.17%	1,204	32.83%	1,259	34.33%	3,667
Socorro	2,545	51.21%	2,425	48.79%	120	2.41%	4,970
Taos	2,636	33.60%	5,210	66.40%	-2,574	-32.81%	7,846
Torrance	1,895	55.90%	1,495	44.10%	400	11.80%	3,390
Union	974	60.57%	634	39.43%	340	21.14%	1,608
Valencia	6,159	49.95%	6,172	50.05%	-13	-0.11%	12,331
Total	209,455	53.05%	185,378	46.95%	24,077	6.10%	394,833

==== Counties that flipped from Democratic to Republican ====
- Bernalillo
- Harding
- Hidalgo
- Socorro
- Torrance
