= Robert E. Ferguson =

American politician

22nd Lieutenant Governor of New Mexico
- In office January 1, 1975 – January 1, 1979
- Governor: Jerry Apodaca
- Preceded by: Roberto Mondragón
- Succeeded by: Roberto Mondragón

Member of the New Mexico Senate

Personal details
- Born: August 5, 1924 Pineland, Texas, U.S.
- Died: October 3, 2016 (aged 92) Mesilla Park, New Mexico, New Mexico, U.S.
- Party: Democratic
- Occupation: Real estate and insurance executive

Robert Earl Ferguson (August 5, 1924 – October 3, 2016) was an American politician. He served as the 22nd lieutenant governor of New Mexico from 1975 to 1979, under Governor Jerry Apodaca. He was an alumnus of Baylor University. Ferguson also was a New Mexico State Senator until his election in 1974 as Lieutenant Governor. He died in October 2016 at the age of 92.

Political offices
Preceded by Roberto Mondragón	Lieutenant Governor of New Mexico; 1975-1979	Succeeded by Roberto Mondragón
