= Bruce King =

American businessman and politician (1924–2009)

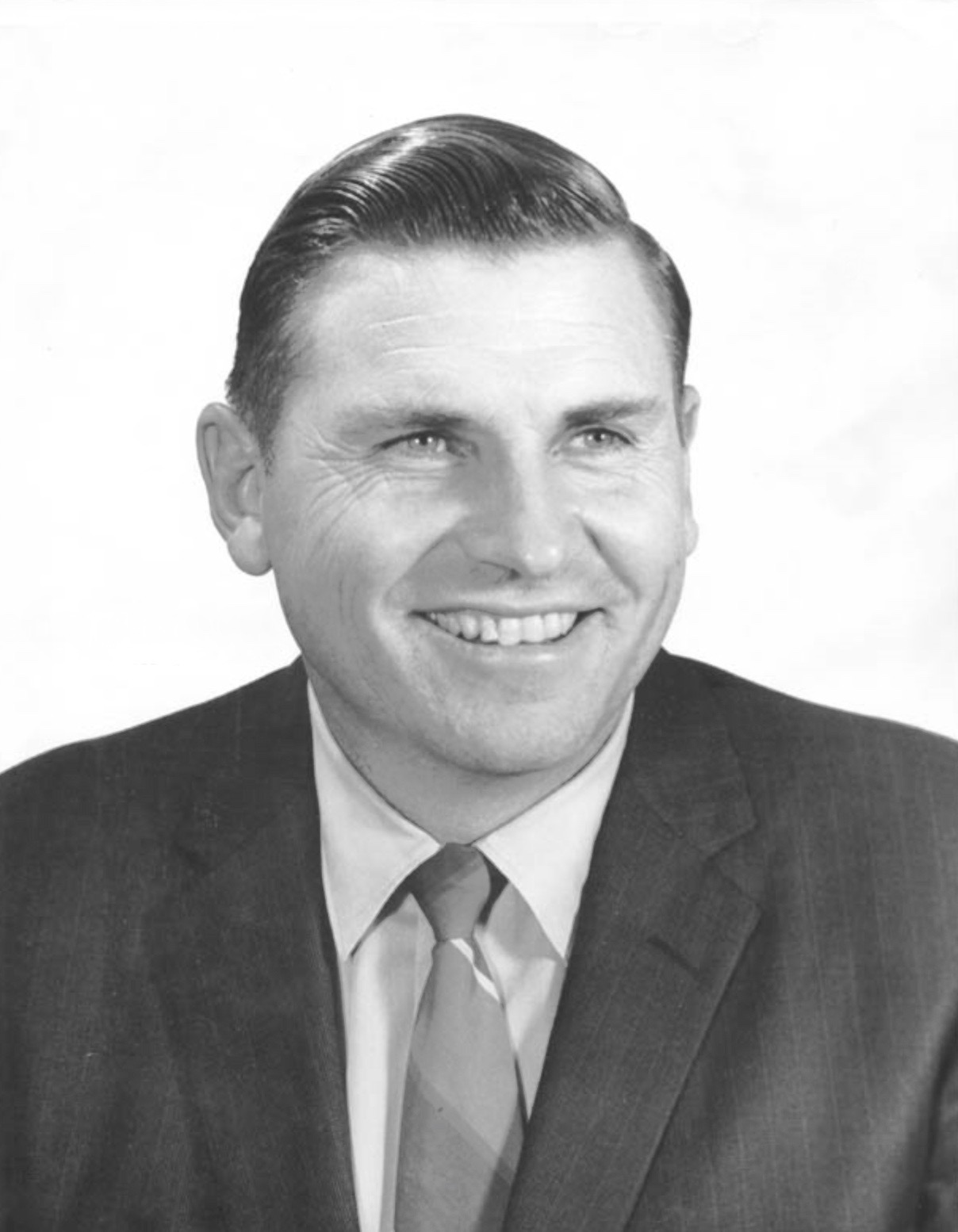

23rd, 25th and 28th Governor of New Mexico
- In office January 1, 1991 – January 1, 1995
- Lieutenant: Casey Luna
- Preceded by: Garrey Carruthers
- Succeeded by: Gary Johnson
- In office January 1, 1979 – January 1, 1983
- Lieutenant: Roberto Mondragón
- Preceded by: Jerry Apodaca
- Succeeded by: Toney Anaya
- In office January 1, 1971 – January 1, 1975
- Lieutenant: Roberto Mondragón
- Preceded by: David Cargo
- Succeeded by: Jerry Apodaca

Member of the New Mexico House of Representatives
- In office 1959–1970

Personal details
- Born: April 6, 1924 Stanley, New Mexico, U.S.
- Died: November 13, 2009 (aged 85) Stanley, New Mexico, U.S.
- Resting place: Stanley Cemetery
- Party: Democratic
- Spouse: Alice King (m. 1947; died 2008)
- Children: Bill King; Gary King
- Education: University of New Mexico
- Profession: Businessman politician

Military service
- Allegiance: United States
- Branch/service: United States Army
- Years of service: 1942–1946
- Battles/wars: World War II

Bruce King (April 6, 1924 – November 13, 2009) was an American businessman and politician who for three non-consecutive four-year terms was the governor of New Mexico. A member of the Democratic Party, he was the longest-serving governor in New Mexico history, with 12 years of service.

== Early life, education, and early political career ==
King was born on April 6, 1924, in Stanley, New Mexico. He served in the U.S. Army during World War II. After the war, he attended the University of New Mexico in Albuquerque, New Mexico.

King's career in politics began when he was elected to the Santa Fe Board of County Commissioners in 1954. He was re-elected and served as the chairman of the board during his second term.

In 1959, he was elected to the New Mexico House of Representatives. He served five consecutive terms in the House and during three of his terms he was Speaker of the House. From 1968 to 1969, King was chairman of the state Democratic Party. In 1969, he was also the president of the State Constitutional Convention.

== Governor of New Mexico ==
County results of the 1990 New Mexico gubernatorial election

In 1970, King was elected governor, defeating Republican Pete Domenici. He served as the 23rd, 25th and 28th Governor of New Mexico from 1971 until 1975, 1979 until 1983 and from 1991 until 1995. His terms were non-consecutive because the New Mexico constitution did not allow governors to succeed themselves before 1991, due to term limits.

King became the first governor who could succeed himself after the term limit laws were changed and ran for reelection in 1994, but was defeated for a fourth term by Republican businessman Gary Johnson.

After the Church Rock uranium mill spill of 1979, King refused the Navajo Nation's request that the site be declared a federal disaster area, limiting aid to affected residents. The spill was the largest release of radioactive material in U.S. history, having released more radioactivity than the Three Mile Island accident four months earlier.

== Personal life ==
King was married to his wife Alice for 61 years until her death on December 7, 2008. In 1974, as governor, Bruce and Alice co-founded the Governor's Award for Excellence in the Arts to celebrate the contribution of local artists. Together they had two children, Bill and Gary. Their son Gary King served as New Mexico Attorney General from 2007 to 2015 and was the Democratic nominee for governor in 2014.

King was recovering from a procedure in September 2009 to adjust the pacemaker that was implanted after he had a heart attack in 1997. He died on November 13, 2009, in Stanley, New Mexico, at the age of 85.

Jeffrey Epstein purchased Zorro Ranch in 1993, reportedly for around $12 million, from King, who was serving as the 28th governor of New Mexico at the time. Epstein built a huge mansion at the ranch, with a living room the size of an average American home.

== Bibliography ==
- Becknell, Charles Sr. (2003) "No Challenge, No Change: Growing Up Black in New Mexico" Jubilee Publications. ISBN 978-0-9744573-0-7
- Colvin, Mark (1982). "The 1980 New Mexico Prison Riot." Social Problems 29.
- Colvin, Mark (1992). "The Penitentiary in Crisis". Accommodation to Riot in New Mexico, State University of New York Press.
- King, Bruce (1998). Cowboy in the Roundhouse: A Political Life. Santa Fe: Sunstone Press.
- McCaffery, Fred (February 14, 1979). "Political Game Snares Becknell" New Mexican Opinion
- "New Report Describes Events Surrounding New Mexico Prison Riot". (June 8, 1980). The New York Times.

Party political offices
Preceded by Fabian Chavez Jr.	Democratic nominee for Governor of New Mexico; 1970	Succeeded by Jerry Apodaca
Preceded by Jerry Apodaca	Democratic nominee for Governor of New Mexico; 1978	Succeeded by Toney Anaya
Preceded by Ray Powell	Democratic nominee for Governor of New Mexico; 1990, 1994	Succeeded by Martin Chávez
Political offices
Preceded by David Cargo	Governor of New Mexico; January 1, 1971 – January 1, 1975	Succeeded by Jerry Apodaca
Preceded by Jerry Apodaca	Governor of New Mexico; January 1, 1979 – January 1, 1983	Succeeded by Toney Anaya
Preceded by Garrey Carruthers	Governor of New Mexico; January 1, 1991 – January 1, 1995	Succeeded by Gary Johnson
