= Casey Luna =

American politician (1931–2026)

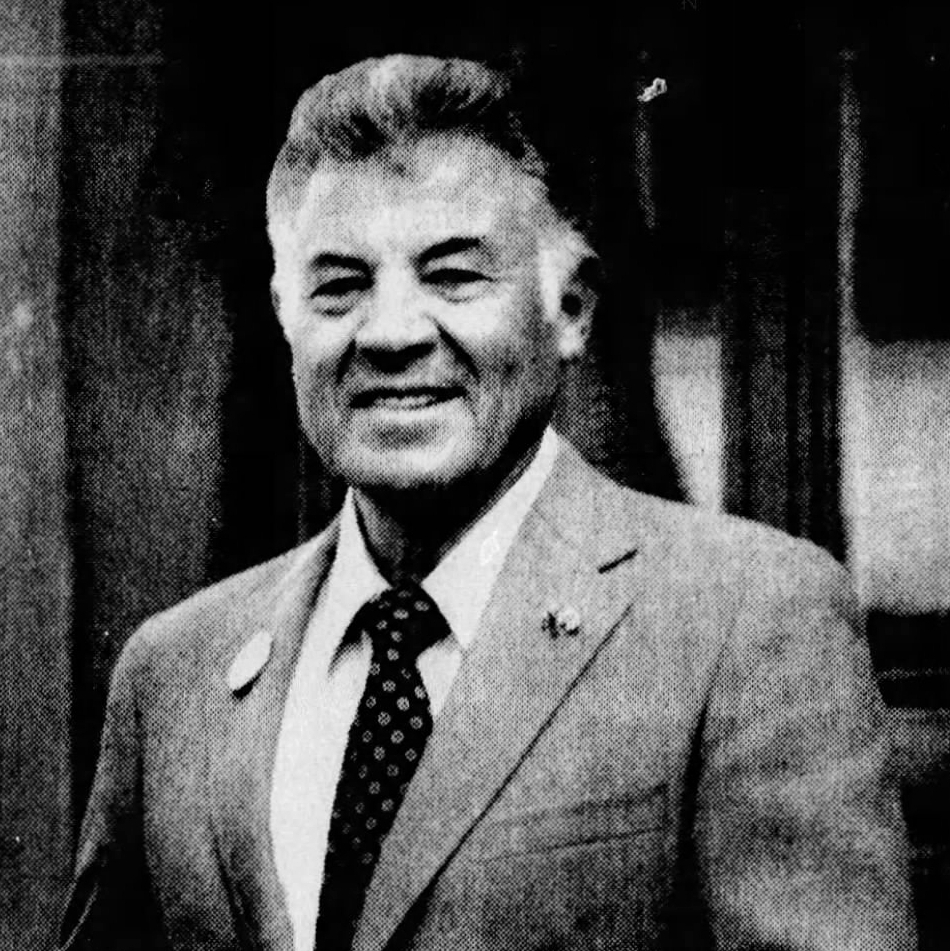
- Luna in 1986

26th Lieutenant Governor of New Mexico
- In office January 1, 1991 – January 1, 1995
- Governor: Bruce King
- Preceded by: Jack L. Stahl
- Succeeded by: Walter Dwight Bradley

Personal details
- Born: May 26, 1931 Jemez Pueblo, New Mexico, U.S.
- Died: June 2, 2026 (aged 95)
- Party: Democratic
- Occupation: Businessman

Casey E. Luna (May 26, 1931 – June 2, 2026) was an American politician, businessman and racing driver who served as the 26th lieutenant governor of New Mexico from 1991 to 1995, under Governor Bruce King. He was also a businessman who ran an automobile dealership in Belen, New Mexico.

== Life and career ==
Luna was born on May 26, 1931, to Casimiro Luna and Ruby Armenta. He was born in Canon de Jemez (modern day Jemez Pueblo). His parents separated when Luna was roughly 13, and he attended Albuquerque High School, although he did not graduate. He worked as a bicycle delivery boy for Western Union. in this capacity in 1948 he personally delivered a telegram to U.S. President Harry S. Truman. Also in 1948, he joined the United States Army and was trained as a medic. His automotive career began when he took a job at a car dealership in Albuquerque. He later filled in as a driver for a race car sponsored by the dealership, later winning the 1955 and 1956 track championships at Speedway Park in Albuquerque. He then owned a sprint car racing team, Casey Luna Ford, from 1985 to 1996. He also owned a car dealership, Casey Luna Ford-Mercury, now known as Melloy Ford.

In 1986, he mounted a bid to become Lieutenant Governor of New Mexico as a Democrat, but did not win. He ran again in 1990 and won, becoming Lieutenant Governor to Governor Bruce King. He was not included in King's advisory circle, which frustrated him.

In 1994, he challenged King in the Democratic gubernatorial primary, but lost. King would go on to lose the general election to businessman Gary Johnson. Luna left office on January 1, 1995, and was succeeded by Walter Bradley.

He had a wife, Beverly, whom he married in 1965, and three daughters and two sons. He was diagnosed with a rare form of cancer in 2019, and also diagnosed with a rare genetic mutation called cerebral cavernous malformation. Luna died on June 2, 2026, at the age of 95.

== See also ==
- List of minority governors and lieutenant governors in the United States

Political offices
Preceded by Jack L. Stahl	Lieutenant Governor of New Mexico; 1991–1995	Succeeded by Walter Dwight Bradley
