= Diane Denish =

American politician

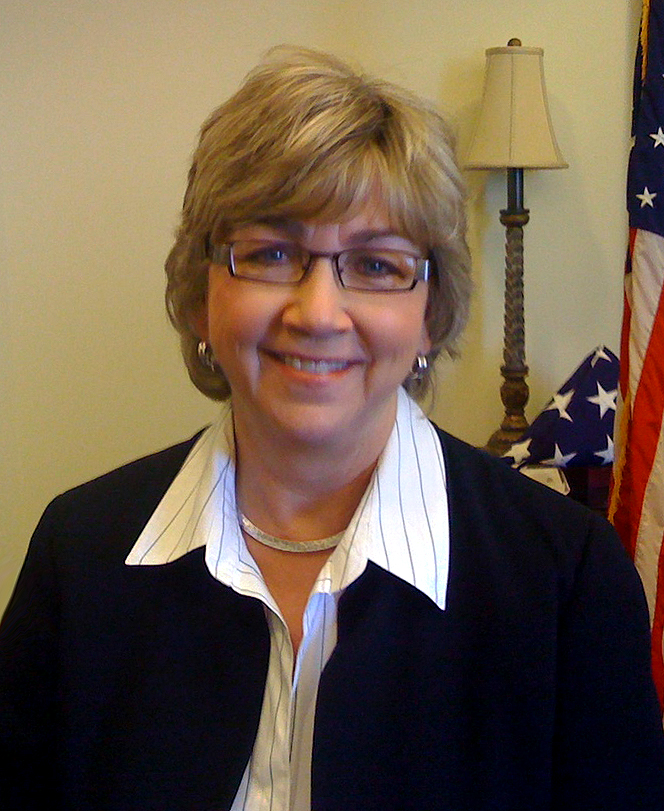

28th Lieutenant Governor of New Mexico
- In office January 1, 2003 – January 1, 2011
- Governor: Bill Richardson
- Preceded by: Walter Bradley
- Succeeded by: John Sanchez

Personal details
- Born: March 7, 1949 (age 77) Hobbs, New Mexico, U.S.
- Party: Democratic
- Spouse: Herb Denish
- Children: 3, including Suzanne Schreiber
- Education: University of New Mexico, Albuquerque (BA)

Diane Daniels Denish (/ˈdɛnɪʃ/ DEN-ish; born March 7, 1949) is an American politician, who was the 28th lieutenant governor of New Mexico from 2003 to 2011 under Governor Bill Richardson. Denish was the first woman to hold that post.

There was early speculation that Denish would run in the 2008 election for the New Mexico Senate seat vacated by Pete Domenici, but she ruled out running. She ran for governor in 2010 and was defeated by Republican nominee Susana Martinez on November 2, 2010.

== Personal life ==
Diane Denish was born March 7, 1949, in Hobbs, New Mexico. Her father, Jack Daniels, was a prominent New Mexico politician and the brother of Bill Daniels. She earned her BA from the University of New Mexico in 1971. Prior to entering politics, she owned and operated The Target Group, a small business specializing in market research and fund-raising for nonprofit organizations. Denish enjoys cooking in her leisure time.

== Political career ==
Denish has served as Chair of the New Mexico Democratic Party, as well as Chair of New Mexico First and Chair of the New Mexico Community Foundation.

Denish has been appointed by three New Mexico Governors to serve in numerous capacities, including as a member of the Board of Regents at New Mexico Tech University, as Chair of the New Mexico Commission on the Status of Women, and as a member of the National Advisory Board of the Small Business Administration under President Bill Clinton. In 1998, she was the Lieutenant Governor candidate on the ticket with Martin Chavez, losing the race 54%-45% to then Governor Gary Johnson.

In her capacity as lieutenant governor, Denish supported legislation to increase microlending funds and place tighter regulations on payday lenders. She also supported legislation to establish voluntary pre-kindergarten enrollment for all New Mexico four-year-olds and legislation to combat methamphetamine manufacturers and dealers who target children.

In addition to her ex officio position as President of the New Mexico Senate, Denish served as chair of the Children's Cabinet, chair of the Mortgage Finance Authority, chair of the Insure New Mexico! Council, chair of the Health Care for New Mexicans Council, and co-chair of the New Mexico Commission for Community Volunteerism.

=== 2010 New Mexico gubernatorial bid ===
Denish began preparing for her gubernatorial bid early and in 2007 had already amassed a war chest of over $1 million. She ran unopposed in the Democratic primary and was the Democratic nominee for Governor of New Mexico.

Denish was defeated in the general election on November 2, 2010 by Doña Ana County District Attorney Susana Martinez, who became New Mexico's first elected female governor, and as well as the first elected Hispanic woman to become governor in U.S. history. The race, along with the 2010 Oklahoma gubernatorial election, were the third and fourth cases of two women being the leading gubernatorial candidates, after the 1986 Nebraska and 2002 Hawaii gubernatorial elections.

== Awards ==
Denish has received the PNM Entrepreneur Advocate of the Year Award (2006), the Leadership New Mexico Distinguished Alumnus Award (2006), the Reverend Martin Luther King, Jr., Community Service Award (2005), the Albuquerque Chamber of Commerce Excellence in Education Award (2005), the WIPP Women Impacting Public Policy New Mexico Legislative Leadership Award (2004), the Hispanic Women’s Council Las Primeras Award, and the National Child Health Advocate Award (2005).

== Controversy ==
In March of 2024, Denish faced allegations of unfairly using her political connections to undermine efforts by her neighborhood to create a childhood playground in a park close to Denish's house. The playground had seeming broad support from the community, with over two thirds of those writing in about the issue voicing their support. Denish admitted to having called NM Governor Michelle Lujan Grisham to request-- successfully-- that funds for the playground be vetoed. When the Governor was asked about why she'd vetoed the park's funding, she stated she'd been informed there was not broad community support. Reasons Denish cited for having requested the veto included her desire for unobstructed views and the belief that children "don’t necessarily need a slide or swing" because they can play creatively without them.

== See also ==
- List of female lieutenant governors in the United States

Political offices
Preceded by Walter Bradley	Lieutenant Governor of New Mexico; 2003–2011	Succeeded by John Sanchez
Party political offices
Preceded by Bill Richardson	Democratic nominee for Governor of New Mexico; 2010	Succeeded by Gary King
