= Metaformic Theory =

Metaformic Theory states that modern-day material culture is rooted in ancient menstruation rituals, called "metaforms". Metaforms are rituals, rites, myths, ideas, or stories created to contain emerging knowledge relating to menstruation.

Metaformic Theory is founded upon anthropological data and artifacts used in menstruation rites or rituals recorded over the last 400 years. The most common of these are menstrual seclusion rites. Menstrual seclusion rites incorporated three basic restrictions for menstruating women: they must not see light, touch water, or touch the earth. Metaformic theorist, Judy Grahn uses the theory to examine how these restrictions "constructed our minds externally, not abstractly, but through using physical metaphors—metaforms—that embody a comparison to a menstrually based idea."

Grahn is referred to as the founder of Metaformic Consciousness. Metaforms themselves have roots in early human culture, but the theory truly emerged when Grahn outlined the Metaformic Theory in her book Blood, Bread, and Roses: How Menstruation Created the World. She continues to write and edit the online journal, Metaformia: A Journal of Menstruation and Culture, which includes many other authors' works on Metaformic Theory and related menstrual topics. Metaformic Theory has been linked to the creation of a "post-queer" theory.

== Key Concepts ==
=== Metaformic Consciousness ===
Metaformic consciousness developed in a period of Chaos, which in this context is a pre-language consciousness "when our pre-human ancestors could not perceive shape, color, light, depth, distance, as we do, and had no names for them and no fixed sense of their qualities." For menstruating women the process of menstrual seclusion became a process of learning. The evolution of women's consciousness was due specifically to separation of light and dark. Menstruants were not allowed to look at light in fear of destroying it and sending everyone back into Chaos, creating a way to retain the knowledge gained through these rites as they had not yet discovered language. When women emerged from seclusion into the light, generally at dawn, they began to see the difference between light and dark, between day and night. Many menstrual seclusion rights required that the emerging woman be led through nature by other women of the village as though it were the first time she was seeing it. Separation from above and below was another common feature of seclusion rites. When in seclusion, the menstruant often was made to lay down or stay up in a tree for the remainder of her cycle, creating a physical separation from above and below.

Ancient cultures used menstrual imagery to explain and connect the events around them. Menstrual rites, once established, also provided ways to organize other aspects of life, including childbirth, illness and death. People also used metaforms as a tool to understand cause and effect and nature's patterns. They could then begin to predict events such as rainfall and other natural phenomena. By sharing and externalizing metaformic consciousness, our pre-human ancestors left Chaos.

Penelope Shuttle and Peter Redgrove point out that, "Our words for 'mind' and 'civilization' came from words which mean 'moon experience,'" referring to the connection between menstruation and the moon.

=== The Four Categories of Metaforms ===
Based on content, all metaforms fall into four categories: Wilderness, Cosmetic, Narrative, and Material.

==== Wilderness ====
Wilderness metaforms often include creatures, formations, and elements of nature that depict menstrual ideas. The most common wilderness metaforms feature a creature attracted to female blood or possessing a suggestively feminine shape. The theory analyzes the ways in which many ancient cultures used a variety of animals in metaformic mythology.

The Wild Dog family, a common deity of tribes in Africa, Eurasia, and North and South America, is commonly used in such mythologies of ancient cultures. The wild dogs, attracted to the smell of blood, created a necessity of seclusion for menstruating women during ancient times. This necessity led to women's menstrual seclusion rites, such as huts built in trees or burying the menstruant and her scents waist deep in a pit with a shelter over her. This seclusion may be seen as a sacrifice to keep the tribe safe from predators, as they were attracted to the smell of blood and the farther the menstruant was from her tribe, the safer they were.

Snakes often appear in metaformic mythologies, such as the Wawilak Sisters Snake myth of Australian aboriginal people. Deities from many different cultures are presented in the form of a snake or serpent. In Central America, the Aztec goddess of creation was a snake and in ancient Greece, Gaia, the earth goddess, was a serpent.

==== Cosmetic ====
Cosmetic metaforms use "human body action, artful movement, shape, ornament and decoration, and even ingestion of meaningful foods", to depict methods of organization of the world. Cosmetic metaforms are the ways in which menstruation rites were made visible upon women's bodies, through various forms of modifications. For many cultures, cosmetic expression after the conclusion of menstrual seclusion was a very specific way of displaying a woman's unique knowledge gained through her experience. Some metaforms were expressed through temporary modifications like painting or dying, while others were more permanent modifications like tattoos, scarification, and embedded objects.

==== Narrative ====
Narrative metaforms are based on language, stories, numbers, and sound that "came about as people imagined themselves and their originators to be characters in a life cycle." Numbers and measurement are of particular significance in narrative metaforms. Beginning with the earliest examples on lunar calendars, menstruation and the cycles of the moon were intertwined in many cultures. Metaformic Theory references many examples of narrative metaforms across cultures. One example is the Hindu goddess, often known as Kali, who possessed many qualities of the narrative metaform. Known also as the goddess of the dark moon, Kali was also tied to the number three, and often possesses an enraged red face. Metaformic theorists also discuss how cultures, like the Romans and Gaelic used the same words for menstruation and the keeping of time, while the Mayan calendar was directly influenced by women's menstrual cycles.

==== Material ====
Material metaforms express our current external cultural ideas through crafting goods from earthen materials. For example, beads, made from animal bones, were dyed and made into necklaces or used for counting menstrual and lunar cycles among ancient women. Necklaces themselves are metaformic, representing the vagina that has powers of creation and destruction. Ancient women crafted jewelry to contain emerging knowledge relating to menstruation and the way the world was organized, fashioning their ontological worldview. Jewelry functions as an expression of human consciousness, abstract thinking, and enhances powers while being an art form made from natural materials.

Another material metaform is the rose which is given as a gift to show love and respect, but fundamentally symbolizing the vulva in its blood red form. This plant has been cultivated and crafted through horticulture, made by humans to share and pass on metaformic consciousness.

== Ethnomathematics ==
Mathematician John Kellermeier posits mathematics as quantitative techniques which humans developed as a survival response. Quantitative thinking is seen as a vital element of culture because of its relevance to society. Kellermeier has found that menstruation played a key role in the development of counting and measuring time through anthropological artifacts. Many other scholars also contend that women invented timekeeping through charting their menses on various animal bones and beads.

Lunar calendars were not only methods for measuring time; they indicated both the phases of the moon and a woman’s menstrual cycle. Lunar markings found on prehistoric bone fragments show how early women tracked their cycles and planned families in correlation with the phases of the moon. The earliest form of counting "artifacts are menstrual calendar bones, notched with correct lunar cycles, tabulating pregnancy and menstruation." The prehistoric calendar bones include the Ishango bone, the most well known, which was discovered on the shore of a lake in Zaire, Africa, and represented a six-month lunar calendar. The Isturitz Baton represented both a five- and four-month lunar calendar. The Blanchard Bone Plaque represented a two-month lunar calendar.

The invention of using beads to family plan is due to the direct correlation of women's menstrual cycles with the lunar cycle. These beads covered in red ochre, which was used in rituals involving nature and perhaps symbolic of menstrual blood, and the animal bones with lunar marking provided the foundations for our elaborate modern mathematic and science systems that took thousands of years for our ancestors to develop.

Much of the evidence on lunar calendars are from the Paleolithic period and characterized by the development of venus or feminine figurines. These "exact lunar tallies [that] fall within ... a complex storied tradition involving at the center a female creatrix figure and all of her characteristic symbols", according to the anthropologist Alexander Marshack. Feminine figures, such as Venus of Willendorf and Venus of Laussel, bear traces of having been covered in red ochre.

== Music ==
Singer and songwriter Polly Wood composed an anthem for metaformia called Bledsung. Wood performed Bledsung live at Kuumbwa Jazz Center in Santa Cruz, California, for the "Goddesses Sing" show on January 25, 2008.

== Film ==
The 2011 film, Poomarem, which means flowering tree, by Vijay Vipan, illustrates many of the core concepts of metaformic theory. Poomarem focuses on the "menstrual origins of sciences and arts, such as geometry, time, painting, and cooking; and also the violence, and the isolation that inevitably accompany the loss of women's rituals within a society."

Vipan states that this film is "A new relational origin story that women's menstrual rituals are the roots of human culture and that in human evolution women and men have markedly different relationships to blood." This film was shown at the 2011 Rotterdam International Film Festival held in Rotterdam, the Netherlands.

== See also ==
- Female cosmetic coalitions
- Cognitive revolution
- Origins of society
- Symbolic culture
- Reproductive synchrony
- Menstrual synchrony
