= Gail Armstrong (politician) =

American politician and businesswoman

Minority Leader of the New Mexico House of Representatives
- Incumbent
- Assumed office January 21, 2025
- Preceded by: Rod Montoya

Member of the New Mexico House of Representatives from the 49th district
- Incumbent
- Assumed office January 20, 2017
- Preceded by: Don Tripp

Personal details
- Born: 1965 or 1966 (age 60–61) Socorro, New Mexico, U.S.
- Party: Republican
- Children: 4

Gail Missy Armstrong (born 1965/1966) is an American politician and businesswoman serving as a member of the New Mexico House of Representatives from the 49th district.

== Early life ==
Armstrong was born in Socorro, New Mexico and raised on a ranch near Magdalena, New Mexico.

== Career ==
Prior to serving in the New Mexico House of Representatives, Armstrong was a member of the committee that organizes the Socorro County Fair. Armstrong was also a board member and one-time president of the Magdalena Municipal School District. She served on the board of the Natural Lands Protection Committee and New Mexico School Board Association, New Mexico Sentencing Commission, and New Mexico State Apprenticeship Council. Armstrong has also founded and operated several small businesses, including a plumbing company and boutique hotel. Armstrong also worked as a political aide in the office of House Speaker Don Tripp, who she succeeded in the upon Tripp's retirement.

In 2019, Armstrong voted against a bill to expand background checks on private firearms, citing the potential difficulty of enforcing new regulations in rural New Mexico.

== Personal life ==
Armstrong and her husband, Dale, have four children.

New Mexico House of Representatives
Preceded by Rod Montoya	Minority Leader of the New Mexico House of Representatives; 2025–present	Incumbent
