= 1990 New Mexico gubernatorial election =

- November 6, 1990
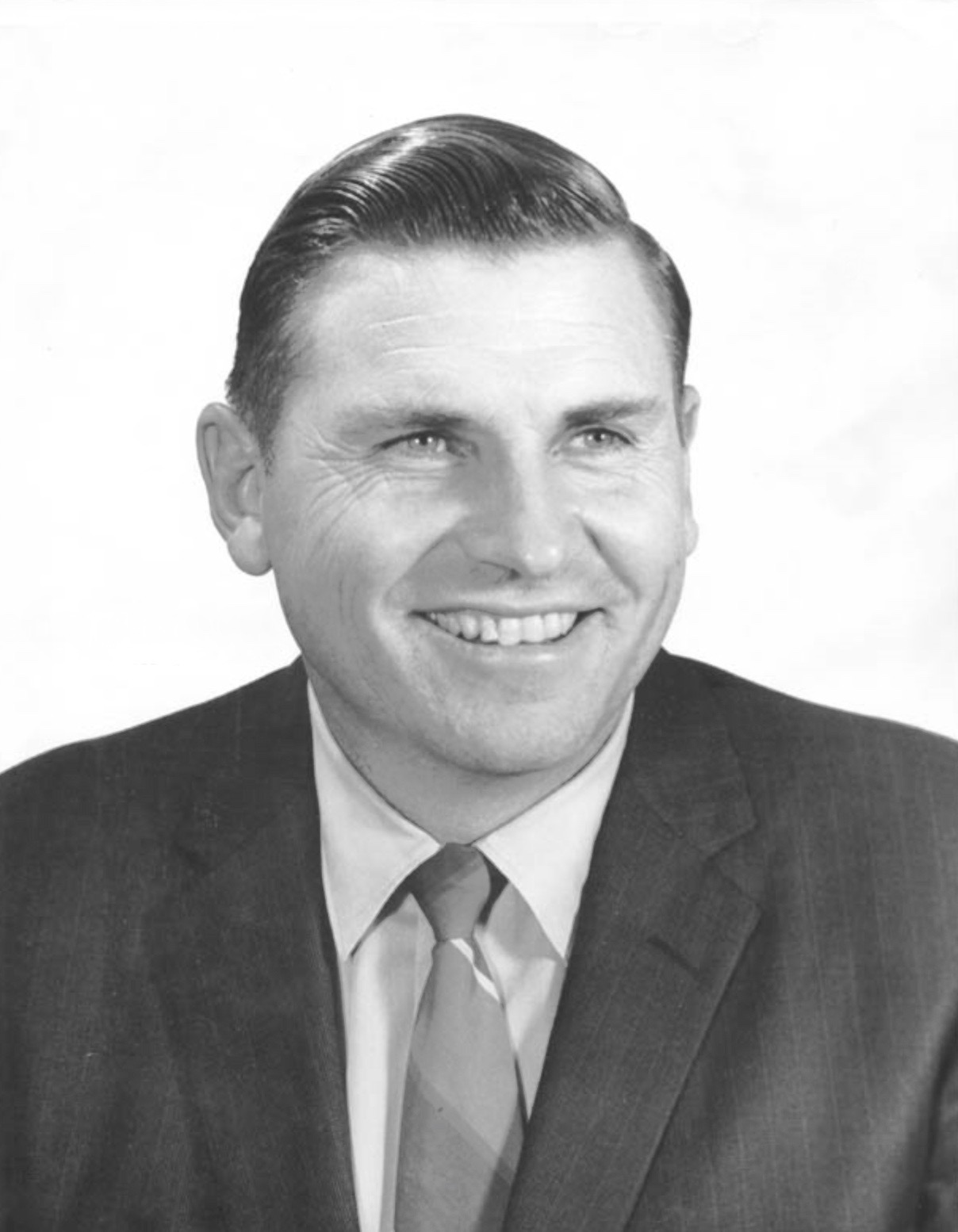

Nominee	Bruce King	Frank Bond
Party	Democratic	Republican
Running mate	Casey Luna	Mary L. Thompson
Popular vote	224,564	185,692
Percentage	54.61%	45.15%
- County results King: 50–60% 60–70% 70–80% Bond: 50–60% 60–70%
Governor before election
Garrey Carruthers
Republican
Elected Governor
Bruce King
Democratic

The 1990 New Mexico gubernatorial election took place on November 6, 1990, in order to elect the Governor of New Mexico. Due to term limits, incumbent Republican Garrey Carruthers was ineligible to seek a second term as governor. (Note: New Mexico's constitution was amended at the general election in 1986 to abolish the ban on consecutive terms for executive officers, but that amendment only applied for those elected starting in 1990.) Democrat Bruce King won his third and final term overall as governor, defeating Republican Frank Bond. King won the largest share of the vote out of his four gubernatorial campaigns. This is the most recent election in which Catron County has voted for a Democratic gubernatorial candidate.

== Primary election ==
=== Democratic primary ===
Former Governor Bruce King won the Democratic primary, defeating former Attorney General Paul Bardacke and 2 other candidates.

==== Results ====
Democratic primary results
Party	Candidate	Votes	%
Democratic	Bruce King	95,884	52.90%
Democratic	Paul Bardacke	70,169	38.72%
Democratic	Tony Scarborough	8,931	4.93%
Democratic	Bob Gold	6,256	3.45%
Total votes		181,240	100.00%

=== Republican primary ===
The Republican primary was won by Frank Bond, who defeated Les Houston, James A. Caudell, and former mayor of Albuquerque Harry E. Kinney.

==== Results ====
Republican primary results
Party	Candidate	Votes	%
Republican	Frank M. Bond	44,928	55.49%
Republican	Les Houston	27,053	33.44%
Republican	James A. Caudell	4,681	5.78%
Republican	Harry E. Kinney	4,289	5.30%
Total votes		80,971	100.00%

== General election ==
=== Results ===
1990 New Mexico gubernatorial election
Party	Candidate	Votes	%	±%
Democratic	Bruce King	224,564	54.61%	+7.66%
Republican	Frank M. Bond	185,692	45.16%	−7.66%
Libertarian	Joseph E. Knight (write-in)	788	0.19%	
Democratic	Thomas S. Macaione (write-in)	192	0.05%	
Majority		38,872	9.45%	
Total votes		411,236	100.00%	
Democratic gain from Republican		Swing	+15.55%	

=== Results by county ===
County	Bruce King Democratic		Frank M. Bond Republican		Joseph E. Knight Libertarian		Thomas S. Macaione Independent Democrat		Margin		Total votes cast
County	#	%	#	%	#	%	#	%	#	%	Total votes cast
Bernalillo	67,965	51.11%	64,601	48.58%	375	0.28%	34	0.03%	3,364	2.53%	132,975
Catron	719	52.95%	630	46.39%	9	0.66%	0	0.00%	89	6.55%	1,358
Chaves	5,997	39.52%	9,156	60.34%	22	0.14%	0	0.00%	-3,159	-20.82%	15,175
Cibola	3,658	67.23%	1,779	32.70%	3	0.06%	1	0.02%	1,879	34.53%	5,441
Colfax	2,571	61.67%	1,598	38.33%	0	0.00%	0	0.00%	973	23.34%	4,169
Curry	4,637	51.27%	4,399	48.63%	7	0.08%	2	0.02%	238	2.63%	9,045
De Baca	579	50.30%	570	49.52%	0	0.00%	2	0.17%	9	0.78%	1,151
Doña Ana	15,443	50.05%	15,365	49.80%	41	0.13%	6	0.02%	78	0.25%	30,855
Eddy	7,368	52.75%	6,583	47.13%	15	0.11%	2	0.01%	785	5.62%	13,968
Grant	5,011	61.61%	3,107	38.20%	15	0.18%	1	0.01%	1,904	23.41%	8,134
Guadalupe	1,576	71.64%	624	28.36%	0	0.00%	0	0.00%	952	43.27%	2,200
Harding	350	56.54%	269	43.46%	0	0.00%	0	0.00%	81	13.09%	619
Hidalgo	1,085	56.81%	825	43.19%	0	0.00%	0	0.00%	260	13.61%	1,910
Lea	5,392	41.57%	7,568	58.35%	10	0.08%	1	0.01%	-2,176	-16.78%	12,971
Lincoln	1,908	41.69%	2,656	58.03%	13	0.28%	0	0.00%	-748	-16.34%	4,577
Los Alamos	3,146	38.62%	4,959	60.88%	41	0.50%	0	0.00%	-1,813	-22.26%	8,146
Luna	2,625	50.76%	2,526	48.85%	17	0.33%	3	0.06%	99	1.91%	5,171
McKinley	8,081	67.24%	3,937	32.76%	0	0.00%	0	0.00%	4,144	34.48%	12,018
Mora	1,656	66.83%	822	33.17%	0	0.00%	0	0.00%	834	33.66%	2,478
Otero	5,833	47.37%	6,450	52.38%	32	0.26%	0	0.00%	-617	-5.01%	12,315
Quay	2,010	57.94%	1,458	42.03%	1	0.03%	0	0.00%	552	15.91%	3,469
Rio Arriba	7,626	74.58%	2,599	25.42%	0	0.00%	0	0.00%	5,027	49.16%	10,225
Roosevelt	2,318	50.21%	2,296	49.73%	3	0.06%	0	0.00%	22	0.48%	4,617
San Juan	10,471	49.49%	10,610	50.14%	78	0.37%	0	0.00%	-139	-0.66%	21,159
San Miguel	5,919	77.05%	1,760	22.91%	2	0.03%	1	0.01%	4,159	54.14%	7,682
Sandoval	8,841	57.47%	6,481	42.13%	0	0.00%	62	0.40%	2,360	15.34%	15,384
Santa Fe	20,025	68.80%	8,942	30.72%	70	0.24%	69	0.24%	11,083	38.08%	29,106
Sierra	1,774	48.83%	1,846	50.81%	12	0.33%	1	0.03%	-72	-1.98%	3,633
Socorro	3,317	60.87%	2,123	38.96%	8	0.15%	1	0.02%	1,194	21.91%	5,449
Taos	4,625	68.60%	2,108	31.27%	6	0.09%	3	0.04%	2,517	37.33%	6,742
Torrance	2,738	71.64%	1,080	28.26%	2	0.05%	2	0.05%	1,658	43.38%	3,822
Union	906	53.04%	800	46.84%	1	0.06%	1	0.06%	106	6.21%	1,708
Valencia	8,394	61.88%	5,165	38.08%	5	0.04%	0	0.00%	3,229	23.81%	13,564
Total	224,564	54.61%	185,692	45.15%	788	0.19%	192	0.05%	38,872	9.45%	411,236

==== Counties that flipped from Republican to Democratic ====
- Bernalillo
- Catron
- Curry
- De Baca
- Doña Ana
- Eddy
- Harding
- Hidalgo
- Luna
- Quay
- Roosevelt
- Socorro
- Torrance
- Union
