= Jack L. Stahl =

American politician (1934–2016)

Jack Stahl

25th Lieutenant Governor of New Mexico
- In office January 1, 1987 – January 1, 1991
- Governor: Garrey Carruthers
- Preceded by: Mike Runnels
- Succeeded by: Casey Luna

Member of the New Mexico Senate
- In office 1981–1986

Member of the New Mexico House of Representatives
- In office 1969–1970

Personal details
- Born: June 28, 1934 Lincoln, Illinois, U.S.
- Died: December 29, 2016 (aged 82) Albuquerque, New Mexico, U.S.
- Party: Republican
- Education: University of New Mexico
- Occupation: Businessman

Jack L. Stahl (June 28, 1934 – December 29, 2016) served as the 25th lieutenant governor of New Mexico and was an American businessman. Born in Lincoln, Illinois, he moved to New Mexico at 17 because of asthma and was Republican. Stahl earned an education degree at the University of New Mexico. From 1969 to 1970, he served in the New Mexico House of Representatives, and from 1981 to 1986 in the New Mexico Senate.

In 1976, Stahl and others secured all New Mexico delegates to support Ronald Reagan for President; in 1980, Stahl's work in New Hampshire, alongside his wife Carol, led to Reagan's primary victory in that state. Reagan's NH victory turned the primary tide in his favor. Many view Jack L. Stahl as a father of the modern conservative movement.

Political offices
Preceded by Mike Runnels	Lieutenant Governor of New Mexico; 1987-1991	Succeeded by Casey Luna
