= Steven Schmidt =

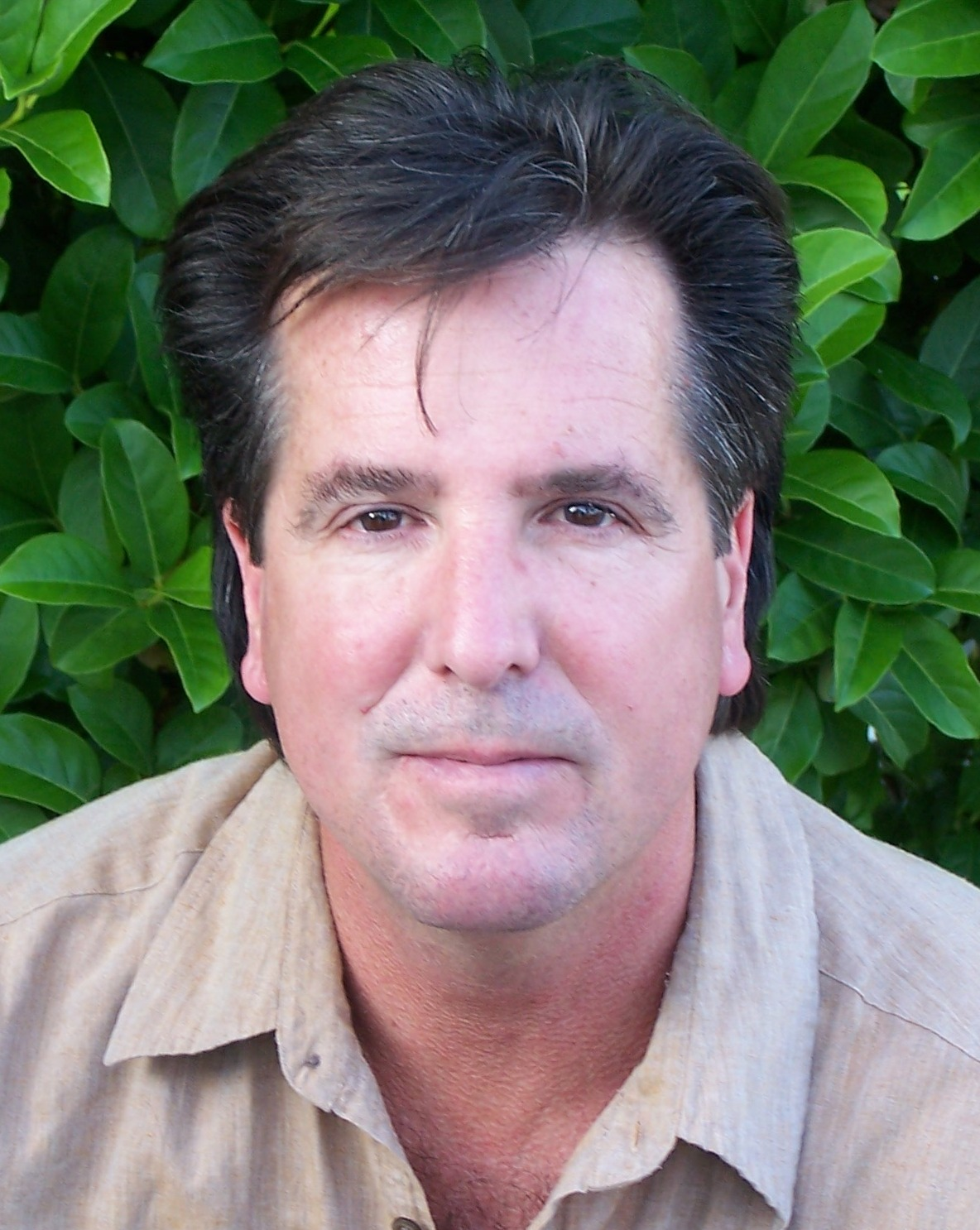
Steven J. Schmidt

Steven J. Schmidt is an American media entrepreneur and a political and environmental activist.

== Biography ==
Steven Schmidt was the lieutenant governor nominee of the Green Party in New Mexico in 1994, receiving 10.4 percent of the vote, an unusually high percent of the vote for third party candidates. As a result of the vote, the New Mexico Green Party became the first independent political party in the state’s history to qualify as a major party with ballot-access under state election law.

After the campaign, Schmidt was nominated for a constitutional position on the New Mexico State Board of Education and confirmed by the Legislature. As "constitutional officers" the Board members were responsible for policy, management and oversight of over 50 percent of the state budget.

Schmidt was an adviser to the Center for Voting and Democracy and from 1993-2003 collaborated with Green party advocates to build a major third-party. After the 1994 New Mexico election, Schmidt put forward a Green model for organizing a platform-based national campaign. Schmidt became the key drafter of the founding platform of the Green Party of the United States as chairperson of the Platform committee from 1995–2001 and became a principal figure in the formation of the national Green Party.

In the international arena, Steve Schmidt created a first-of-its-kind 1999 "Blue-Green" initiative bringing labor groups and environmentalists together for sustainable jobs and conservation; proposed and co-drafted the initial "Common Ground Platform" aligning U.S. Greens and thirty two European Green parties; participated in the subsequent proposal and drafting of the first international "Global Greens Charter" and in 2004 attended the founding meeting of the European Green Party in Rome, Italy.

In 1998, Senator Paul Wellstone, who reviewed campaign finance and voting reform proposals with Schmidt from 1990 on, met in Albuquerque with Schmidt to discuss his writing for the Senator’s exploratory committee for President. Schmidt agreed and worked with him until his decision in 1999 to abandon the campaign due to health issues. In 2004, Schmidt co-established the Green Institute/Green Policy360 with Dean Myerson and co-authored with Roger Morris its first strategic policy paper, "Strategic Demands of the 21st Century: A New Vision for a New World". He co-established the Green Policy wiki site in 2004 to "compete with the Republican’s Legislative Exchange, ALEC strategy." A writer on security and peace issues, Schmidt co-organized the 2006 "Surviving Victory" conference in Washington, DC.
