= Lee Francis =

American writer

- Born: May 21, 1945; Cubero, New Mexico, U.S.
- Died: July 7, 2003 (aged 58); Albuquerque, New Mexico, U.S.
- Education: San Francisco State University (BA, MA); Western Institute for Social Research (PhD)

Elias Lee Francis III (May 21, 1945 – July 7, 2003) was an American poet of Native descent, educator, and founder of the Wordcraft Circle of Native Writers and Storytellers.

== Early life ==
Francis was born on May 21, 1945, in Cubero, New Mexico. He was one of five children of Elias Lee Francis II (1913–2001), who served as the 20th lieutenant governor of New Mexico from 1967 to 1971 and Ethel Haines Francis née Gottleib (1916–1991). His older sister, Paula Gunn Allen (1939–2008) was a professor of English and American Indian studies at University of California, Los Angeles and one of the foremost voices in Native American literature. Francis and his siblings were not enrolled in the Laguna Pueblo.

== Career ==
=== Academic ===
Francis earned his B.A. and M.A. degrees from San Francisco State University, and a PhD from the Western Institute for Social Research in Berkeley, California. Francis served as Visiting Associate Professor and Interim Director of Native American Studies department at the University of New Mexico, and the American Studies program at American University, where he also served as Director of the Washington Internships for Native Students (WINS) program. He also served as Director of the Pre-Engineering Intensive Learning Academy for Native students at California State University, Long Beach, Student Affairs Officer at University of California Santa Barbara, Associate Director of the Educational Opportunity Program at San Francisco State University, and Senior Faculty with Meta-Life Adult Professional Training Institute.

=== Native American writing ===
Francis was the National Director of Wordcraft Circle of Native Writers and Storytellers starting in 1992. He served on the Diversity Committee of the United Way of America, and was an active member in the National Coalition for Indian Education and the National Indian Education Association.

=== Government service ===
Francis served as an Indian Youth Specialist with the Bureau of Indian Affairs Office of Alcohol and Substance Abuse Prevention, where he was Editor of Prevention Quarterly. Francisco also served as a Legislative Assistant to United States Senator Hugh Scott, Special Assistant to U. S. Senator Pete V. Domenici, and Staff Assistant with the United States Congress Joint Committee on the Organization of Congress. He worked as a proposal reader for the United States Department of Education's Javits Gifted and Talented Program and the Indian Fellowship program, which funds Native American university undergraduate and graduate students. Francis worked for the United States Bureau of Reclamation, United States Department of Education's Vocational Education program, the Office of Educational Research and Improvement.

=== Research ===
Francis was actively engaged in a number of research projects. He studied posttraumatic stress disorder (PTSD) as applied to cultural groups, describing the research in this area as cultural idiocide. Other research interests included the national problem of homelessness, testing models to radically decrease racist behavior in urban communities, and evaluating prevention programs designed to impact alcohol and substance abuse among Native American Indian populations.

== Death ==
Lee Francis died in Albuquerque, New Mexico, of cancer on July 7, 2003.

== Awards ==
Francis was awarded the 2004 Lifetime Achievement Award from the Native Writers' Circle of the Americas. In 2003, he earned the Albuquerque Arts Alliance’ Bravos Award for Excellence in Literature.

Lee was a Trustee of the Laguna Pueblo Educational Foundation and a member of the editorial board of Michigan State University Press American Indian Literature Series. He was a member of the Board of Directors of the Albuquerque Indian Center, the Native Writers' Circle of the Americas, and the Greenfield Literary Review Center. He was an elected member of the National Psychiatric Association.

== Works ==
=== Books ===
- On the Good Red Interstate: Truck Stop Tellings and Other Poems, Taurean Horn Press.
- When the Rain Sings: Poems by Young Native Americans, (Editor), Simon & Schuster.
- Native Time: A Historical Timeline of Native American, St. Martin's Press.
- Reclaiming The Vision - Past, Present and Future: Native Voices for the Eighth Generation, Edited with James Bruchac, Greenfield Review Press.

=== Anthologies ===
- Genocide of the Mind, Marijo Moore (Editor), Thunder's Mouth Press.
- English Studies/Culture Studies: Institutionalizing Dissent, Isaiah Smithson & Nancy Ruff (Editors), University of Illinois Press.
- The Telling of the World: Native American Stories and Art, W. S. Penn (Editor), Stewart, Tabori & Chang.
- Columbus & Beyond: Views from Native Americans, Southwest Parks & Monuments.
- Blue Dawn, Red Earth: New Native American Storytellers, Clifford E. Trafzer (Editor), Anchor Books
- Callaloo: Native Literatures Special Issue, 17, 1994, Johns Hopkins University Press.
