= Rod Montoya =

American politician (born 1966)

Minority Leader of the New Mexico House of Representatives
- In office April 5, 2024 – January 21, 2025
- Preceded by: James G. Townsend (acting)
- Succeeded by: Gail Armstrong

Member of the New Mexico House of Representatives from the 1st district
- Incumbent
- Assumed office January 1, 2015
- Preceded by: Thomas C. Taylor

Personal details
- Born: October 25, 1966 (age 59) Farmington, New Mexico, U.S.
- Party: Republican

Rodney D. "Rod" Montoya (born October 25, 1966) is an American politician who has served in the New Mexico House of Representatives from the 1st district since 2015.

Montoya was elected as House Minority Leader in April 2024.

New Mexico House of Representatives
Preceded by James G. Townsend; Acting	Minority Leader of the New Mexico House of Representatives; 2024–2025	Succeeded by Gail Armstrong
