= Nick Tinnin =

American politician in New Mexico

Member of the New Mexico House of Representatives from the 2nd district
- In office January 2003 – May 2003
- Preceded by: Thomas C. Taylor
- Succeeded by: Dick Cheney

Member of the New Mexico House of Representatives from the 1st district
- In office January 2001 – January 2003
- Preceded by: Jerry Sandel
- Succeeded by: Thomas C. Taylor

Personal details
- Party: Republican
- Profession: Politician

James Nicholas Tinnin Jr. is an American politician and a former Republican member of the New Mexico House of Representatives.

== New Mexico House of Representatives ==
Tinnin was elected to the New Mexico House of Representatives in 2000 after defeating incumbent Jerry Sandel. He won re-election in 2002 and resigned in May 2003. Tinnin was replaced by former State Representative Dick Cheney, who previously represented the 2nd district from 1985 to 1995.

== Electoral history ==
New Mexico House of Representatives 1st district election, 2000
Party	Candidate	Votes	%	±%
Republican	James Nicholas Tinnin, Jr.	4,943	56.54%	
Democratic	Jerry Sandel (inc.)	3,800	43.46%	
Turnout		8,743		
Republican gain from Democratic		Swing		

New Mexico House of Representatives 2nd district election, 2002
Party	Candidate	Votes	%	±%
Republican	James Nicholas Tinnin, Jr.	4,574	100.00%	1.52%
Turnout		4,574		
Republican hold		Swing		
