= Judy Grahn =

American poet and author (born 1940)

Judy Rae Grahn
- Born: July 28, 1940 (age 86); Chicago, Illinois
- Occupations: Author, poet
- Website: www.judygrahn.org

Judy Grahn (born July 28, 1940) is an American poet and author.

Inspired by her experiences of disenfranchisement as a butch lesbian, she became a feminist poet, highly-regarded in underground circles before achieving public fame. A major influence in her work is Metaformic Theory, tracing the roots of modern culture back to ancient menstrual rites, though she does not regard the philosophy as exclusively feminist. Grahn teaches women's mythology and ancient literature at the California Institute of Integral Studies and other institutions.

== Early life and education ==
Judy Rae Grahn was born in 1940 in Chicago, Illinois. Her father was a cook and her mother was a photographer's assistant. Grahn described her childhood as taking place in "an economically poor and spiritually depressed late 1950s New Mexico desert town near the hellish border of West Texas."

When she was eighteen, she eloped with a student named Yvonne at a nearby college. Grahn credits Yvonne with opening her eyes to gay culture. Soon after that she joined the United States Air Force. At twenty-one she was discharged (in a "less than honorable," manner, she stated) for being a lesbian.

Grahn experienced a fair amount of homophobia during the odd jobs she did to earn money for school, trying to find housing, and was beat up for her butch attire. "These jolts taught me everything I would ever need to know about the oppression of Gay people," she mentioned in an interview with Tongue.

At the age of 25, Grahn suffered from Inoculation lymphoreticulosis, or Cat Scratch Fever, which led to her being in a coma. After overcoming her illness, she realized that she wanted to become a poet. This realization was partially due to the abuse and mistreatment Grahn faced for being openly lesbian. Of the incident, Grahn stated "I realized that if I was going to do what I had set out to do in my life, I would have to go all the way with it and take every single risk you could take.... I decided I would not do anything I didn't want to do that would keep me from my art."

Grahn then moved to the west coast where she became active in the feminist poetry movement of the 1970s. During this period, many rumors surfaced pertaining to Grahn's weight and a possible eating disorder. Grahn attributes her thin frame to poor eating habits, smoking cigarettes, and drinking coffee.

She earned her PhD from the California Institute of Integral Studies. Until 2007, Grahn was the director of the Women's Spirituality (MA) and Creative Inquiry (MFA) programs at the New College of California.

== Career ==
Grahn knew she was a poet by the time she was nine. She had written poetry until she was sixteen, but it wasn't until she was twenty-five that she consciously committed herself to her work after overcoming her illness.

Grahn was a member of the Gay Women's Liberation Group, GWLG, the first lesbian-feminist collective on the west coast, founded in 1969. Grahn and her partner at the time, artist Wendy Cadden, produced books, poems, and graphics. This contributed the basis of the Women's Press Collective (WPC), which strived to devote "itself exclusively to work by lesbians disfranchised by race or class." GWLG is also responsible for founding the women's bookstore A Woman's Place. Grahn's poems circulated in "periodicals, performances, chapbooks, and by word of mouth, and were foundational documents of lesbian feminism." Her work did not extend to a commercial audience until the late 1970s; however, it garnered a wide underground audience before 1975. Carl Morse and Joan Larkin cite Grahn's work as "fueling the explosion of lesbian poetry that began in the 70s."

Grahn's poetry is at times free verse, and is infused with her feminist lesbian identity. Her works stay true to her working-class roots, covering racism, sexism, classism, and the struggles of being female and a lesbian. She uses plain language and what the Poetry Foundation describes as an "etymological curiosity that often eschews metaphor in favor of incantation." Grahn does not limit her work to just written poetry, but also collaborates with other artists such as singer-songwriter Anne Carol Mitchell and dancer and choreographer Anne Blethenthal. Her writing is heavily political and focuses on the strength of lesbian culture and critiqued heterosexist biases and the patriarchy.

Today, Grahn co-edits the online journal Metaformia, a journal about menstruation and women's culture.

=== Works ===
Her first poetry collection, Edward the Dyke and Other Poems was released in 1971, and was combined with She Who (1972) and A Woman is Talking to Death (1974) in a poetry collection titled The Work of a Common Woman in 1978. In 1974 she held a reading of the poetry from the first two books at an event organized by the Westbeth Playwrights Feminist Collective. On A Woman is Talking to Death Grahn stated that it began "a redefinition for myself of the subject of love." A collection of selected and newer poems, love belongs to those who do the feeling (2008) won the 2009 Lambda Literary Award for Lesbian Poetry.

Grahn's poetry has been used as a source of empowerment and a way to reestablish possession of words and signs of lesbian culture that are often used as derogatory by outsiders. In a short poem from the She Who collection (1971–1972) she confidently asserts, "I am the dyke in the matter, the other / I am the wall with the womanly swagger / I am the dragon, the dangerous dagger / I am the bulldyke, the bulldagger."

1985, Grahn published The Highest Apple. A book of essays, it focuses on the relationship between the poetry and lives of 9 modern lesbian poets and Sappho, the Ancient Greek poet. Grahn works to recenter their work and their societal roles from the margins to the center. center.

In 1993, Grahn published, Blood, Bread, and Roses: How Menstruation Created the World which focuses on menstrual rituals as the origin of human civilization by using anthropology, history, archeology, myths, and stories.

In addition, lines from her Common Woman collection became "touchstones for the women's movement in the seventies, such as 'the common woman is as common as the best of bread/ and will rise.'"

=== Theory ===
Margot Gayle Backus cites Grahn's best work as her poem, "A Woman is Talking to Death". She argues for its "extraordinary impact on its audiences and readers", and attributes this to "Grahn's assumption of an utterly believable, vulnerable poetic voice that fearlessly and scrupulously speaks the truth to an overwhelming but nonetheless nameable, identifiable, and therefore negotiable power." Backus argues that Grahn's "prophetic poetic voice" may be attributed to works such as "Lycidas" or that of the poets Shakespeare and Donne. Backus writes that in "A Woman is Talking to Death", "the central themes of the elegy and the love lyric interpenetrate in complex and innovative ways... Grahn thematically consolidates two major canonical poetic genres with deep roots in the historical development of poetic representation in Europe while radically transforming them by introducing into poetic form a broad nexus of trends in twentieth-century lesbian writing."

Grahn is a chief theorist behind Metaformic Theory, a theory that traces the roots of culture back to ancient menstrual rites. The theory first emerged in her book Blood, Bread, and Roses. Although some believe that Grahn was a separatist due to her involvement in lesbian feminism, she states that her Metaformic philosophy was inclusive.

Grahn also plays with language in her poem "The woman in three pieces". Lydia Bastida Tullis cites Grahn as emphasizing language's formal properties "by increasingly straining its ability to make 'sense,'" and ultimately calling into question "the speaker's (and reader's) relationship to language."

== Personal life ==
From 1981 to 1986, Grahn lived in a committed relationship with poet and author, Paula Gunn Allen. The couple held regular Sunday gatherings at Mama Bears Coffeehouse and Bookstore on Telegraph Avenue in north Oakland California, to discuss topics related to women’s spirituality.

Today, Grahn lives in California and teaches at the California Institute of Integral Studies, the New College of California, and the Institute for Transpersonal Psychology. There she teaches women's mythology and ancient literature, Metaformic Consciousness (a philosophy created by Grahn), and Uncommon Kinship – a course that uses theories from her Metaformic philosophy.

=== Awards ===
Grahn has received a grant from the National Endowment for the Arts, an American Book Review award, an American Book Award, a Stonewall Book Award, and a Founding Foremothers of Women's Spirituality Award. She received the Bill Whitehead Award for Lifetime Achievement from Publishing Triangle in 1994. In 2022, she received the Second Annual Reginald Martin Award for Excellence in Criticism from PEN Oakland for Eruptions of Inanna: Justice, Gender, and Erotic Power.

=== Judy Grahn Award for Lesbian Nonfiction ===
In 1997, Publishing Triangle, an association of lesbians and gay men in publishing, established the Judy Grahn Award for Lesbian Nonfiction to recognize the best nonfiction book of the year affecting lesbian lives.

== Works ==
=== Nonfiction ===
- Another Mother Tongue: Gay Words, Gay Worlds. Boston: Beacon Press (1984). ISBN 978-0807079119
- The Highest Apple: Sappho And The Lesbian Poetic Tradition (Spinster’s Ink 1985).
- Really Reading Gertrude Stein: A Selected Anthology With Essays (Crossing Press 1990). ISBN 0-89594-381-6
- Blood, Bread, and Roses: How Menstruation Created the World (Beacon Press 1993). ISBN 0-8070-7505-1
- A Simple Revolution: the Making of an Activist Poet (Aunt Lute Books 2012).
- with Gina Covina and Laurel Galana. The Lesbian Reader. Barn Owl Books (1975). ISBN 0-9609626-0-3
- with Lisa Maria Hogeland. The Judy Grahn Reader. San Francisco: Aunt Lute Books (2009). ISBN 1-879960-80-X
- Eruptions of Inanna: Justice, Gender, and Erotic Power. Nightboat Books (2021). ISBN 978-1643620763

=== Fiction ===
- Mundane's World. Crossing Press (1988). ISBN 0-89594-316-6
- The Work of a Common Woman: The Collected Poetry of Judy Grahn 1964–1977. Crossing Press (1984). ISBN 0-89594-155-4
- A Simple Revolution. Aunt Lute Books (November 27, 2012). ISBN 1-879960-87-7

=== Poetry ===
- The Common Woman Poems (Women's Press Collective 1970).
- Edward the Dyke and Other Poems. (Women's Press Collective 1971).
- A Woman is Talking to Death (Women's Press Collective 1974)
- She Who (Women's Press Collective/Diana Press 1977).
- The Work of a Common Woman: Collected Poetry (1964–1977). St. Martin's Press (1982). ISBN 0-312-88948-8
- The Queens of Wands. (Crossing Press 1982). ISBN 0-89594-095-7
- The Queen of Swords (Beacon Press 1987).
- Love Belongs to Those Who Do the Feeling (1966-2006). Red Hen Press (2008). (Winner, 2009 Lambda Literary Award for Lesbian Poetry)
- Hanging on our Own Bones (Red Hen Press 2017).

=== Recordings ===
- Detroit Annie Hitchhiking (2009)
- Lunarchy (2010)

== See also ==
- Lesbian Poetry
