= Jerry Sandel =

American politician (1942–2024)

Member of the New Mexico House of Representatives from the 2nd district
- In office 1971–2000
- Preceded by: ?
- Succeeded by: Nick Tinnin

Personal details
- Born: May 25, 1942 Woodson, Texas, U.S.
- Died: October 25, 2024 (aged 82) Farmington, New Mexico, U.S.
- Party: Democratic
- Relations: Stella, Spencer, Zooey, Jasper
- Children: Jason Sandel, Jeffery Sandel, Shelly Sandel
- Profession: Businessman

Jerry Wayne Sandel (May 25, 1942 – October 25, 2024) was an American politician who was a Democratic member of the New Mexico House of Representatives from 1971 to 2000. Sandel attended Texas Tech University and was in the oil business, serving as president of the Aztec Well Servicing Company in Aztec, New Mexico. He died in Farmington, New Mexico on October 25, 2024, at the age of 82.

== Electoral history ==
New Mexico House of Representatives 1st district election, 2000
Party	Candidate	Votes	%	±%
Republican	James Nicholas Tinnin, Jr.	4,943	56.54%	
Democratic	Jerry Sandel (inc.)	3,800	43.46%	
Turnout		8,743		
Republican gain from Democratic		Swing		
