= Thomas C. Taylor =

American politician (born 1948)

Tom Taylor

Member of the New Mexico House of Representatives from the 1st district
- In office January 2003 – January 2015
- Preceded by: Nick Tinnin
- Succeeded by: Rod Montoya

Member of the New Mexico House of Representatives from the 2nd district
- In office January 1999 – January 2003
- Succeeded by: Nick Tinnin

Personal details
- Born: Thomas Charles Taylor; May 2, 1948 (age 78) Farmington, New Mexico, U.S.
- Party: Republican
- Spouse: Bev
- Children: Four
- Education: Brigham Young University, University of New Mexico
- Occupation: Businessman, politician

Thomas Charles "Tom" Taylor (born May 2, 1948, in Farmington, New Mexico) is the minority floor leader in the New Mexico House of Representatives, 2006–2010. He represented the New Mexico State House 1st district centered on Farmington in San Juan County, from January 1999 through 2014.

Taylor is a graduate of Brigham Young University and the University of New Mexico. He is the former owner and operator of Farmington Lumber and Hardware, and was a former mayor of Farmington. He and his wife Bev are the parents of four children. Taylor is a Latter-day Saint.

== Political views ==
Representative Taylor sticks close to a number of Republican ideologies. He is opposed to abortion and planned parenthood programs, receiving a rating of 0% from the Planned Parenthood of New Mexico Positions on Reproductive Rights (an interest group). In addition, Taylor has taken a pro-business position during his time as Representative, as evidenced by his high approval rating from the New Mexico National Federation of Independent Business, another interest group. Furthermore, he is opposed to gun control, which is shown by the favorable ratings he has received from the NRA.

On the issue of health care, Taylor takes a clear position. When it comes to government involvement in insurance exchanges, Taylor has stated the following: "I don't see why the government even has to play a role. " As such, he was opposed to the Health Insurance Exchange bill that set a goal for 2014 that would set up and create state health insurance exchanges.

Representative Taylor's most recent votes were associated with redistricting and retirement age. He opposed HB 39 State House Redistricting, however, the bill passed regardless. Taylor supported a bill which would raise the retirement age for certain public employees. As of March 15, 2011, the bill has been passed in the House.

== Sources ==
- Project Vote Smart bio
- Project Vote Smart
