= Garrey Carruthers =

American politician and academic

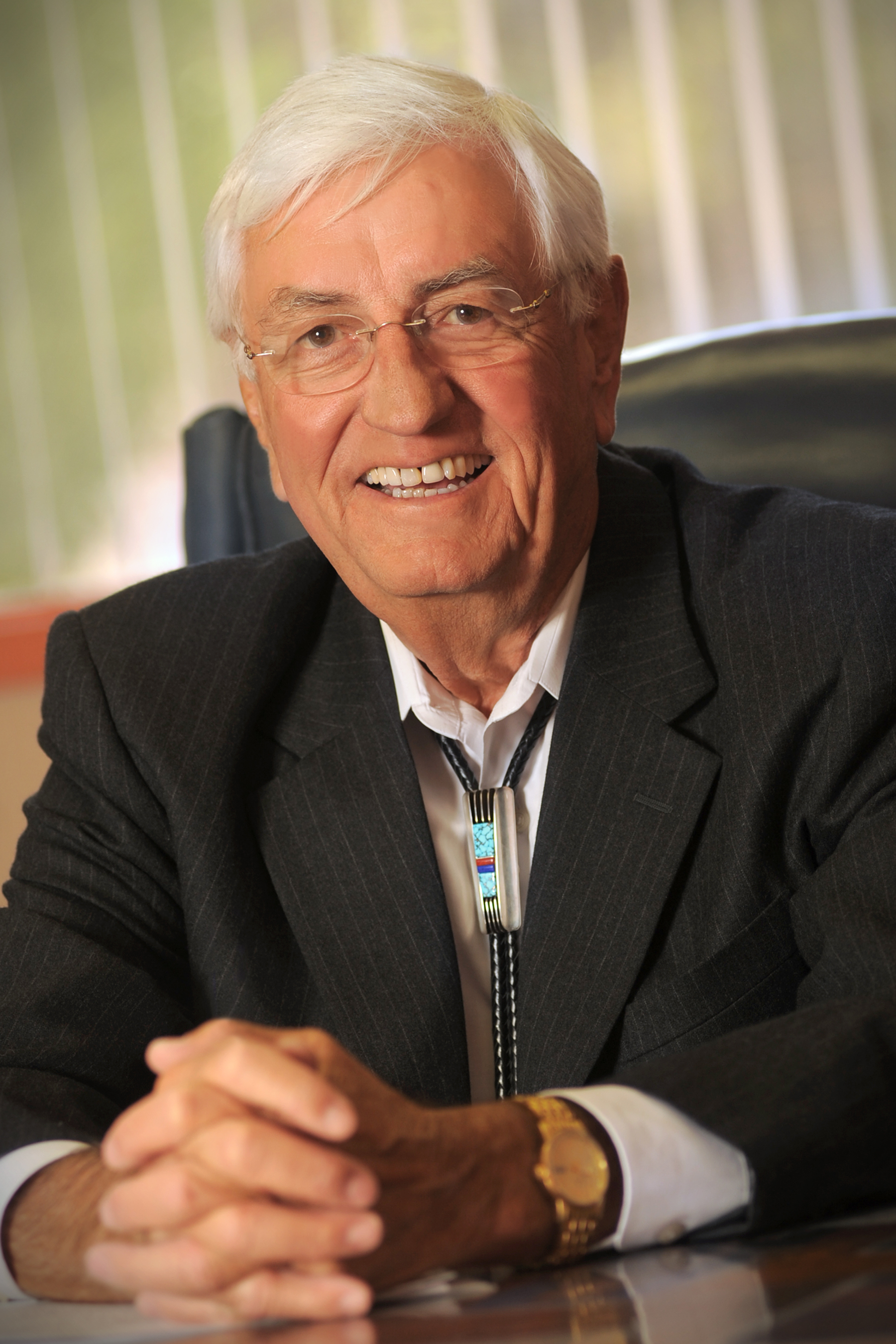

Chancellor of New Mexico State University
- In office May 6, 2013 – June 30, 2018
- Preceded by: Manuel Pacheco (acting)
- Succeeded by: John D. Floros (president); Dan Arvizu (chancellor)

27th Governor of New Mexico
- In office January 1, 1987 – January 1, 1991
- Lieutenant: Jack L. Stahl
- Preceded by: Toney Anaya
- Succeeded by: Bruce King

Personal details
- Born: Garrey Edward Carruthers; August 29, 1939 (age 86) Alamosa, Colorado, U.S.
- Party: Republican
- Spouse: Kathy Carruthers
- Education: New Mexico State University (BS, MS); Iowa State University (PhD)

Garrey Edward Carruthers (born August 29, 1939) is an American politician and academic who served as the 27th governor of New Mexico and the chancellor of New Mexico State University. He previously served as special assistant to the U.S. Secretary of Agriculture from 1974 to 1975, director of the New Mexico Water Resources Research Institute at NMSU, state chair of the Republican Party of New Mexico from 1977 to 1979, and United States Deputy Secretary of the Interior for Land and Resources from 1981 to 1984.

== Early life and education ==
Carruthers was born in Alamosa, Colorado. He earned a Bachelor of Science degree in agriculture in 1964 and Master's degree in agricultural economics in 1965, both from New Mexico State University. He then earned a PhD in economics in 1968 from Iowa State University.

== Career ==
Carruthers served as a White House Fellow at the Department of Agriculture from 1974-75. A Republican, he was elected the 27th governor of New Mexico in 1986. A major focal point of the race was reinstating the death penalty, resulting in outgoing Democratic governor Toney Anaya commuting the sentences of all inmates on death row in protest. His term ended in 1991, and term limits at the time prevented New Mexico governors from seeking consecutive terms. Carruthers was succeeded by Democrat Bruce King, who had previously served two non-consecutive terms as governor.

After leaving office, he served as founding president and CEO of the Cimarron Health Plan, now Molina Healthcare of New Mexico, Inc., from 1993 to 2003. In 2003, he was named dean of NMSU's College of Business. He helped establish NMSU's economic development operation, the Arrowhead Center, and served as the university's vice president for economic development. He also helped establish the Domenici Institute and serves as its director. In May 2013, he was appointed president of New Mexico State University by the Board of Regents in a 3-2 vote. In 2017, the Board of Regents announced that his contract would not be renewed, resulting in his retirement effective July 1, 2018. He was succeeded by John D. Floros, a food scientist and former dean of the Kansas State University College of Agriculture.

=== Views on science ===
Questioned by faculty at an on-campus meeting on his candidacy to become NMSU chancellor in 2013, Carruthers said that there was not a scientific consensus on climate change, stating "I don't know. I'm an economist. I don't do global warming. It's a scientific judgment that I can't make." Concerns were also raised about his role in the Advancement of Sound Science Center, a lobbying group that he chaired from 1993 to 1998.

Party political offices
| Preceded by John Irick | Republican nominee for Governor of New Mexico; 1986 | Succeeded by Frank Bond |
Political offices
| Preceded by Toney Anaya | Governor of New Mexico; 1987–1991 | Succeeded by Bruce King |
Academic offices
| Preceded by Manuel Pacheco; Acting | Chancellor of New Mexico State University; 2013–2018 | Succeeded by John D. Floros as President of New Mexico State University |
| Preceded by Manuel Pacheco; Acting | Chancellor of New Mexico State University; 2013–2018 | Succeeded by Dan Arvizu as Chancellor of New Mexico State University |
U.S. order of precedence (ceremonial)
| Preceded by Toney Anaya as Former Governor | Order of precedence of the United States | Succeeded by Gary Johnson as Former Governor |
