= Walter Dwight Bradley =

American politician

27th Lieutenant Governor of New Mexico
- In office January 1, 1995 – January 1, 2003
- Governor: Gary Johnson
- Preceded by: Casey Luna
- Succeeded by: Diane Denish

Member of the New Mexico Senate
- In office 1989–1994

Personal details
- Born: October 30, 1946 (age 79)
- Party: Republican

Walter Dwight Bradley (born October 30, 1946) is an American politician who served as the 27th lieutenant governor of New Mexico under Governor Gary Johnson from 1995 through 2003.

== Career ==
Prior to his election as Lieutenant Governor, Bradley served in the New Mexico Senate from 1989 to 1994. Bradley was preceded as lieutenant governor by Casey Luna and succeeded by Diane Denish. Bradley ran for Governor of New Mexico in 2002, but was defeated in the Republican primary by state Representative John Sanchez, who lost the general election to Bill Richardson.

He is currently working for the Dairy Farmers of America, Inc. as director of government and industry relations for the Southwestern United States.

Political offices
Preceded by Casey Luna	Lieutenant Governor of New Mexico; 1995-2003	Succeeded by Diane D. Denish
