= Richard Cheney (New Mexico politician) =

American politician (born 1937)

Member of the New Mexico House of Representatives from the 2nd district
- In office May 21, 2003 – January 2007
- Preceded by: Nick Tinnin
- Succeeded by: James Strickler
- In office January 1985 – January 1995

Personal details
- Born: Richard Cheney; April 1, 1937 (age 89)
- Party: Republican
- Children: 3
- Education: New Mexico State University (BS)

Richard P. Cheney (born April 1, 1937) is an American politician and a former Republican member of the New Mexico House of Representatives.

== Early life and education ==
Dick Cheney was born on April 1, 1937, and graduated from Clovis High School. He earned a Bachelor of Science degree in civil engineering from New Mexico State University.

== Career ==
Cheney was the House Minority Leader while in the New Mexico House of Representatives in the 1990s. As a state legislator, Cheney's positions included being anti-abortion, pro-gun rights and pro-business. He voted for a $103 Million tax hike in 1987 to help prevent cutting education spending due to a loss of gas and oil revenue.

On May 20, 2003, Cheney was appointed by the San Juan County Commission to replace State Representative Nick Tinnin. He was re-elected unopposed in 2004 but did not run for re-election in 2006.

=== 1994 gubernatorial campaign ===
Dick Cheney ran in the Republican primary for the 1994 New Mexico gubernatorial election. He chose Pete Rahn as his campaign manager. A campaign ad from The Santa Fe New Mexican showed that he ran on a platform highlighting cracking down on violent crime, repealing the gasoline tax, and lowering public spending. When Cheney legally changed his first name from Richard to Dick, his polling numbers increased tremendously. This created controversy, as opponents including John Dendahl stated that people voting in the polls would confuse Cheney with the former Secretary of Defense Dick Cheney from Wyoming, improving his chances of winning the primary.

He received 49% of the vote at the Republican State Convention in 1994. Cheney lost the primary by one point receiving 33% of the vote right behind Gary Johnson at 34%.

== Personal life ==
Dick Cheney is married to his wife, Janie, and has three children. He is a member of Rotary International.

== See also ==
- Robert E. Casey, 69th Treasurer of Pennsylvania who was confused with Bob Casey Sr. in the 1976 Pennsylvania State Treasurer election
