= Elias Lee Francis II =

American politician

20th Lieutenant Governor of New Mexico
- In office 1967–1970
- Governor: David Cargo
- Preceded by: Mack Easley
- Succeeded by: Roberto Mondragón

Personal details
- Born: March 16, 1913 Cibola County, New Mexico, U.S.
- Died: September 11, 2001 (aged 88) Henderson, Nevada, U.S.
- Party: Republican
- Children: Paula Gunn Allen, Lee Francis

Elias Lee Francis II (March 16, 1913 – September 11, 2001) was an American politician. He served as the 20th lieutenant governor of New Mexico from 1967 to 1970.

== Life and career ==
Francis was born in Cibola County, New Mexico.

In 1966, Francis was elected to the New Mexico lieutenant governorship, succeeding Mack Easley. He served until 1970, when he was succeeded by Roberto Mondragón.

Francis died in September 2001 at his son's home in Henderson, Nevada, at the age of 88.
