= John D. Floros =

John Floros

President of New Mexico State University
- In office July 1, 2018 – January 7, 2022
- Preceded by: Garrey Carruthers (Chancellor)

Personal details
- Born: Greece
- Education: Agricultural University of Athens (BS, MS); University of Georgia (PhD)

John D. Floros is a food scientist and academic administrator whose research focuses on food engineering, food processing, and food packaging. He is a professor of food process engineering and packaging at New Mexico State University (NMSU), where he also served as president from 2018 to 2022. Previously, he was dean of the College of Agriculture and director of K-State Research and Extension at Kansas State University, and head of the Department of Food Science at Pennsylvania State University. He served as president of the Institute of Food Technologists from 2007 to 2008.

== Early life and education ==
Floros was born and raised in Greece. After earning a Bachelor's and Master's of Science in food science and technology from the Agricultural University of Athens, Floros relocated to the United States to earn his Ph.D. in food science and technology from the University of Georgia.

Before beginning his academic career in the United States, Floros worked in Greece's food-processing industry. From 1977 to 1981, he was a production supervisor at Asteris, Inc., a fruit and vegetable processing facility. From 1981 to 1983, he served as plant manager at a tomato processing manufacturing facility owned by Ilia’s Central Union of Agricultural Cooperatives.

== Career ==
During his PhD studies, Floros served as a research assistant in the University of Georgia's Department of Food Science and Technology. After completing his doctorate in 1988, he joined Purdue University as an assistant professor of food process engineering and packaging. He was promoted to associate professor in 1993 and professor in 1998.

Floros worked as a senior research engineer at the Nestlé Research and Development Center in New Milford, Connecticut. He was also elected a professor of food science, packaging, and engineering at the Aristotle University of Thessaloniki in Greece in 1999.

In 2000, Floros joined Pennsylvania State University as head of the Department of Food Science and professor of food science, packaging, and engineering. He led the department until 2012, when he was appointed dean of the College of Agriculture at Kansas State University. At Kansas State, he also became director of K-State Research and Extension. His responsibilities included academic administration, research leadership, agricultural outreach, and collaboration with industry, community and government organizations.

In 2018, Floros became the 28th president of New Mexico State University. During his tenure, the university developed the LEADS 2025 strategic plan, which focused on student success, research, outreach, and institutional effectiveness. University communications during his presidency also highlighted efforts to stabilize enrollment, increase research expenditures, expand fundraising, and strengthen community engagement.

In November 2021, the NMSU Faculty Senate approved a resolution of no confidence in Floros and Provost Carol Parker. The student government also approved a no-confidence resolution. The resolutions raised concerns about administrative leadership, university spending, and shared governance. The Board of Regents of the university ordered an Audit of the allegations in the Resolutions of No-Confidence, which found almost all of them to be “unsubstantiated.” Floros announced on January 7, 2022, that he would step down as president as the university reorganized its leadership structure under Chancellor Dan Arvizu. He subsequently returned to the faculty as a professor of food process engineering and packaging.

Floros served as president of the Institute of Food Technologists (IFT) from 2007 to 2008. From 2009 to 2013, he served on the U.S. Food and Drug Administration’s Science Board; and in 2017-2018, he co-chaired the National Academies of Sciences, Engineering and Medicine’s Executive Committee on “Science Breakthroughs to Advance Food and Agricultural Research.

== Research ==
Floros' research focuses on the application of chemical engineering, applied mathematics, statistical methods, and food science to food processing and packaging. His work examines food quality and safety, shelf-life extension, preservation of product characteristics, and the efficiency of food manufacturing operations.

Floros has used mathematical modeling and statistical methods to study food processing. His research has examined thermal and non-thermal processing, the effects of processing conditions on food quality and shelf life, and the optimization of processes used in the production of tomatoes and other fruits and vegetables.

He has also applied response surface methodology to food production, using statistical analysis to assess processing variables and determine conditions that meet requirements for product quality, safety, and production efficiency.

Floros' research has examined food packaging, including the physical properties of packaging films and the transfer of chemical compounds between packaging materials and food. His work has addressed migration and sorption phenomena and their effects on food quality and shelf life.

He has also studied active food packaging, including oxygen scavengers, moisture absorbers and antimicrobial packaging films. His publications have examined the operation of these systems and their use in controlling food deterioration and maintaining product quality and safety.

Floros' research has included the evaluation of processing and packaging technologies designed to improve food safety. This work has involved the effects of processing conditions on microorganisms, the use of antimicrobial packaging materials, and the relationship between food processing, packaging integrity, and product stability.

His work also focuses on thermal and non-thermal food-processing methods, aseptic processing and packaging, and the development of new products and equipment for food manufacturing and food-service operations.

Floros has written on the contribution of food science and technology to food production and global food supply. In a 2010 review co-authored with other food scientists, he examined the development of food production and processing technologies and their role in meeting the food needs of a growing population. The review also discussed technological approaches to improving food production, processing, safety, and availability.

== Selected publications ==
- FLOROS, JOHN D.; CHINNAN, MANJEET S. (1990). "Diffusion Phenomena during Chemical (NaOH) Peeling of Tomatoes". Journal of Food Science. 55 (2): 552–553. doi:10.1111/j.1365-2621.1990.tb06808.x. ISSN 0022-1147.
- FLOROS, JOHN D.; EKANAYAKE, ATHULA; ABIDE, GEORGE P.; NELSON, PHILLIP E. (1992). "Optimization of a Diced Tomato Calcification Process". Journal of Food Science. 57 (5): 1144–1148. doi:10.1111/j.1365-2621.1992.tb11284.x. ISSN 0022-1147.
- GUILLOU, ANNE A.; FLOROS, JOHN D. (1993). "Multiresponse Optimization Minimizes Salt in Natural Cucumber Fermentation and Storage". Journal of Food Science. 58 (6): 1381–1389. doi:10.1111/j.1365-2621.1993.tb06188.x. ISSN 0022-1147.
- HAN, JUNG HOON; FLOROS, JOHN D. (1998). "Simulating Diffusion Model and Determining Diffusivity of Potassium Sorbate Through Plastics to Develop Antimicrobial Packaging Films". Journal of Food Processing and Preservation. 22 (2): 107–122. doi:10.1111/j.1745-4549.1998.tb00808.x. ISSN 0145-8892.
- Ozen, Banu F; Floros, John D (2001). "Effects of emerging food processing techniques on the packaging materials". Trends in Food Science & Technology. 12 (2): 60–67. doi:10.1016/s0924-2244(01)00053-x. ISSN 0924-2244.
- <OZDEMIR, MURAT; FLOROS, JOHN D. (2004). "Active Food Packaging Technologies". Critical Reviews in Food Science and Nutrition. 44 (3): 185–193. Bibcode:2004CRFSN..44..185O. doi:10.1080/10408690490441578. ISSN 1040-8398. PMID 15239372.
- Floros, John D.; Newsome, Rosetta; Fisher, William; Barbosa-Cánovas, Gustavo V.; Chen, Hongda; Dunne, C. Patrick; German, J. Bruce; Hall, Richard L.; Heldman, Dennis R.; Karwe, Mukund V.; Knabel, Stephen J.; Labuza, Theodore P.; Lund, Daryl B.; Newell-McGloughlin, Martina; Robinson, James L. (2010-08-26). "Feeding the World Today and Tomorrow: The Importance of Food Science and Technology". Comprehensive Reviews in Food Science and Food Safety. 9 (5): 572–599. Bibcode:2010CRFSF...9..572F. doi:10.1111/j.1541-4337.2010.00127.x. ISSN 1541-4337. PMID 33467827.
- TRINETTA, VALENTINA; FLOROS, JOHN D.; CUTTER, CATHERINE N. (2010-04-15). "SAKACIN A-CONTAINING PULLULAN FILM: AN ACTIVE PACKAGING SYSTEM TO CONTROL EPIDEMIC CLONES OF LISTERIA MONOCYTOGENES IN READY-TO-EAT FOODS". Journal of Food Safety. 30 (2): 366–381. doi:10.1111/j.1745-4565.2010.00213.x. ISSN 0149-6085.
- Committee on Science Breakthroughs 2030: A Strategy for Food and Agricultural Research; Board on Agriculture and Natural Resources; Board on Atmospheric Sciences and Climate; Board on Life Sciences; Water Science and Technology Board; Division on Earth and Life Studies; Food and Nutrition Board; Health and Medicine Division; Board on Environmental Change and Society (2019-03-21). Science Breakthroughs to Advance Food and Agricultural Research by 2030. Washington, D.C.: National Academies Press. doi:10.17226/25059. ISBN 978-0-309-47392-7.
