= Cubero, New Mexico =

- Census-designated place
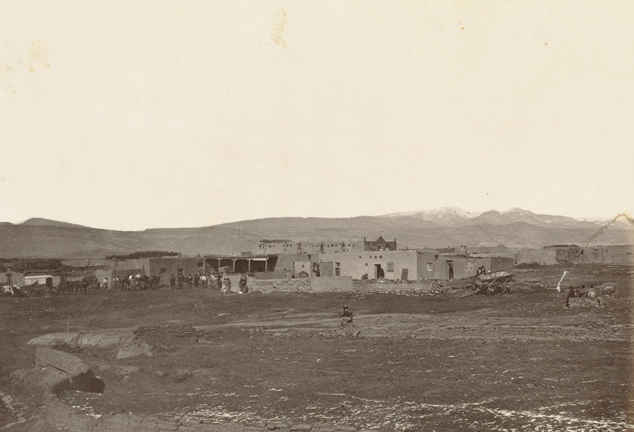
- The Mexican town of Cubero, ca. 1867

- Location within New Mexico
- Coordinates: 35°05′25″N 107°31′05″W
- Country: United States
- State: New Mexico
- County: Cibola

Area
  - Total: 9.57 sq mi (24.78 km^{2})
  - Land: 9.57 sq mi (24.78 km^{2})
  - Water: 0 sq mi (0.00 km^{2})
- Elevation: 6,208 ft (1,892 m)

Population (2020)
  - Total: 281
  - Density: 29.4/sq mi (11.34/km^{2})
- Time zone: UTC-7 (Mountain (MST))
  - Summer (DST): UTC-6 (MDT)
- ZIP code: 87014
- Area code: 505
- GNIS feature ID: 2584085

Cubero is a census-designated place in Cibola County, New Mexico, United States. As of the 2020 census, Cubero had a population of 281. Cubero has a post office with ZIP code 87014.

== History ==
The town was founded by Mexicans and was located along the route of the Santa Fe Railroad's first transcontinental rail line through the Southwestern United States.

== Demographics ==
Historical population
Census	Pop.	Note	%±
2020	281		—
U.S. Decennial Census

== Geography ==
=== Climate ===
Climate data for Cubero, New Mexico, 1991–2020 normals, extremes 1977–present
Month	Jan	Feb	Mar	Apr	May	Jun	Jul	Aug	Sep	Oct	Nov	Dec	Year
Record high °F (°C)	70 (21)	75 (24)	91 (33)	88 (31)	97 (36)	104 (40)	103 (39)	100 (38)	98 (37)	90 (32)	78 (26)	71 (22)	104 (40)
Mean maximum °F (°C)	62.3 (16.8)	66.1 (18.9)	74.3 (23.5)	80.9 (27.2)	88.7 (31.5)	97.2 (36.2)	98.3 (36.8)	94.7 (34.8)	90.9 (32.7)	82.3 (27.9)	71.7 (22.1)	62.3 (16.8)	99.6 (37.6)
Mean daily maximum °F (°C)	49.0 (9.4)	53.5 (11.9)	61.5 (16.4)	68.7 (20.4)	77.7 (25.4)	88.3 (31.3)	89.9 (32.2)	87.1 (30.6)	81.3 (27.4)	70.5 (21.4)	58.2 (14.6)	48.3 (9.1)	69.5 (20.8)
Daily mean °F (°C)	33.7 (0.9)	37.5 (3.1)	44.1 (6.7)	51.2 (10.7)	59.8 (15.4)	69.8 (21.0)	73.6 (23.1)	71.2 (21.8)	64.5 (18.1)	53.1 (11.7)	41.4 (5.2)	32.9 (0.5)	52.7 (11.5)
Mean daily minimum °F (°C)	18.4 (−7.6)	21.6 (−5.8)	26.7 (−2.9)	33.7 (0.9)	41.8 (5.4)	51.2 (10.7)	57.4 (14.1)	55.2 (12.9)	47.6 (8.7)	35.8 (2.1)	24.7 (−4.1)	17.5 (−8.1)	36.0 (2.2)
Mean minimum °F (°C)	3.1 (−16.1)	6.7 (−14.1)	11.2 (−11.6)	19.3 (−7.1)	28.5 (−1.9)	38.6 (3.7)	49.4 (9.7)	47.2 (8.4)	33.7 (0.9)	20.1 (−6.6)	9.3 (−12.6)	0.1 (−17.7)	−2.6 (−19.2)
Record low °F (°C)	−13 (−25)	−27 (−33)	−1 (−18)	10 (−12)	20 (−7)	31 (−1)	42 (6)	40 (4)	26 (−3)	3 (−16)	3 (−16)	−16 (−27)	−27 (−33)
Average precipitation inches (mm)	0.55 (14)	0.44 (11)	0.49 (12)	0.48 (12)	0.57 (14)	0.47 (12)	1.92 (49)	1.89 (48)	1.19 (30)	0.81 (21)	0.57 (14)	0.62 (16)	10.00 (254)
Average snowfall inches (cm)	3.9 (9.9)	2.4 (6.1)	1.4 (3.6)	0.7 (1.8)	0.0 (0.0)	0.0 (0.0)	0.0 (0.0)	0.0 (0.0)	0.0 (0.0)	0.6 (1.5)	1.4 (3.6)	4.6 (12)	15.0 (38)
Average precipitation days (≥ 0.01 in)	2.6	2.6	2.2	2.1	2.6	3.0	8.3	8.2	5.2	3.2	2.4	2.3	44.7
Average snowy days (≥ 0.1 in)	1.4	1.2	0.6	0.3	0.0	0.0	0.0	0.0	0.0	0.2	0.6	1.6	5.9
Source 1: NOAA
Source 2: National Weather Service
