= Bataan Memorial Building =

- New Mexico Territorial and State Capitol
- U.S. National Register of Historic Places
- NM State Register of Cultural Properties
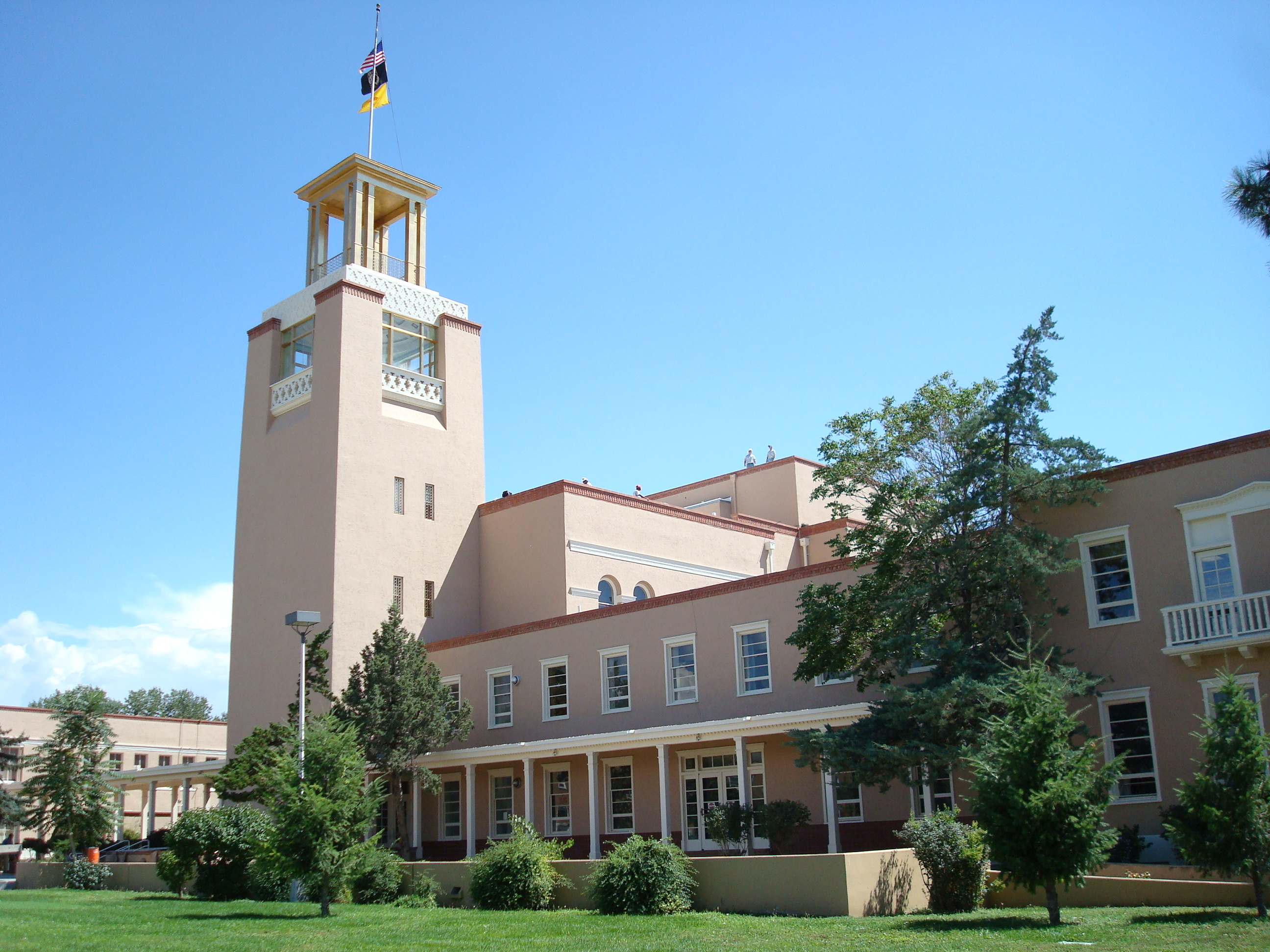
- The building in 2007

- Location within New Mexico Location within the United States
- Location: 407 Galisteo Street; Santa Fe, New Mexico
- Coordinates: 35°41′2″N 105°56′32″W
- Built: 1900
- Architect: Isaac Hamilton Rapp (original); Trost & Trost (1923 addition); Willard C. Kruger (1952 additions and remodeling)
- Architectural style: Territorial Revival
- NRHP reference No.: 100011470
- NMSRCP No.: 2088

Significant dates
- Added to NRHP: February 28, 2025
- Designated NMSRCP: December 6, 2024

The Bataan Memorial Building is a state government building in Santa Fe, New Mexico, which formerly served as the New Mexico Territorial Capitol from 1900 to 1912 and State Capitol from 1912 to 1966. Since being replaced by the present New Mexico State Capitol, the building has housed various state government offices. It was listed on the New Mexico State Register of Cultural Properties in 2024 and the National Register of Historic Places in 2025.

The building had a series of additions completed in 1910, 1923, and 1952. During the 1952 project, the dome and portico of the old capitol were removed and the entire complex was remodeled in the Territorial Revival style, largely obscuring the original architecture. However, some details, such as the arched windows on the third floor, are still visible.

The former capitol was renamed in 1968 to honor over 800 New Mexicans who died during the Battle of Bataan and subsequent Bataan Death March during World War II. A memorial, consisting of an eternal flame and a concrete insignia which originally marked the headquarters of the 200th Coast Artillery at Fort Bliss, was dedicated at the southeast corner of the grounds in 1966.

== History ==
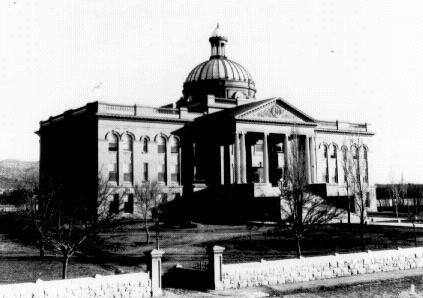
The Territorial Capitol, viewed from approximately the same angle as above, as it appeared when built

The Bataan Memorial Building was New Mexico's third Territorial Capitol, replacing an earlier building which was completed in 1886 and destroyed only six years later by a fire which was believed to have been set intentionally. The building was uninsured and its loss cost the territory over $200,000. The United States Courthouse in Santa Fe was used as a temporary capitol while the new permanent building was being constructed.

The new capitol was designed by Isaac Hamilton Rapp and completed in 1900. After the costly loss of the previous building, the new capitol was completed on a shoestring budget of less than $140,000, using salvaged materials and unpaid convict labor from the Penitentiary of New Mexico to save money. The building was three stories high with a silver dome, cupola, and neoclassical portico. The first story was constructed from sandstone reused from the old capitol, while the second and third floors were yellow brick and the portico was Indiana limestone. It was dedicated on June 4, 1900.

A two-story annex, housing offices on the first floor and the Territorial law library on the second floor, was added to the rear of the capitol in 1910. That same year, the United States Congress passed an Enabling Act authorizing New Mexico to organize a state government and apply for statehood. In October and November, 1910, the capitol hosted the constitutional convention which drafted the Constitution of New Mexico. On January 6, 1912, at 1:35 PM, President William Taft signed the proclamation admitting New Mexico as the 47th state of the Union.

In 1922–23, a two-story brick addition designed by the firm of Trost & Trost was built to the east of the 1910 annex. This building contained offices for the state Public Health Bureau and Highway Department. The Santa Fe New Mexican reported that, prior to construction of the new building, the capitol was so overcrowded that temporary workspaces had been set up in hallways and in the House and Senate chambers when the legislature was not in session.

A major project to expand and modernize the capitol complex was undertaken in 1949–1952 under the supervision of architect Willard C. Kruger. A new Executive Building, housing the offices of the Governor, Secretary of State, and Bureau of Revenue, was built on the west (front) side of the old capitol. This necessitated demolition of the original portico and steps. The older buildings were also remodeled to match the Executive Building, including removal of the capitol dome, which had sometimes been criticized as not in keeping with the "Santa Fe style". Kruger, the architect, initially planned to work in the Pueblo Revival style, but ultimately decided that Territorial Revival architecture was better suited to an office building with a large number of windows. Because the removal of the dome meant there was no longer a place to mount a flagpole, he also added a five-story tower at the north end of the building.
