= Alice M. King =

American children's advocate (1930–2008)

Alice King

First Lady of New Mexico
- In role January 1, 1991 – January 1, 1995
- Governor: Bruce King
- Preceded by: Kathy Carruthers
- Succeeded by: Dee Johnson
- In role January 1, 1979 – January 1, 1983
- Governor: Bruce King
- Preceded by: Clara Apodaca
- Succeeded by: Elaine Anaya
- In role January 1, 1971 – January 1, 1975
- Governor: Bruce King
- Preceded by: Ida Jo Anaya Cargo
- Succeeded by: Clara Apodaca

Personal details
- Born: Alice Marie Martin; May 13, 1930 Moriarty, New Mexico
- Died: December 7, 2008 (aged 78) Albuquerque, New Mexico
- Resting place: Stanley Cemetery; Stanley, New Mexico
- Party: Democratic
- Spouse: Bruce King (m. 1947)
- Children: Bill King; Gary King

Alice Marie Martin King (May 13, 1930 – December 7, 2008) was an American children's rights advocate and former First Lady of New Mexico as the wife of three-term Governor Bruce King. The longest-serving first lady in New Mexico's history, Alice King helped to create the New Mexico Children, Youth, and Families Department, a cabinet-level state agency, and modernize the New Mexico's Children's Code, a series of laws designed to protect at-risk children and regulate the juvenile justice system. King also established the first official Office of the First Lady in 1990s, with offices in the New Mexico State Capitol. She became the first woman to be inducted into the New Mexico Women's Hall of Fame.
