= Clara Apodaca =

American patron

Secretary of the New Mexico Department of Cultural Affairs
- In office July 1985 – July 1987
- Governor: Toney Anaya; Garrey Carruthers
- Preceded by: Jill Cooper Udall
- Succeeded by: Helmuth Naumer

First Lady of New Mexico
- In role January 1, 1975 – January 1, 1979
- Governor: Jerry Apodaca
- Preceded by: Alice King
- Succeeded by: Alice King

Personal details
- Born: Clara R. Melendres; 1934 (age 91–92) Doña Ana, New Mexico, U.S.
- Party: Democratic
- Spouse: Jerry Apodaca (m. 1956, divorced)
- Children: Five

Clara R. Apodaca (born 1934 in Doña Ana, New Mexico) is an American patron of the arts, nonprofit executive, and politician. Apodaca served as the First Lady of New Mexico from 1975 to 1979 during the tenure of her then-husband, Governor Jerry Apodaca. In April 1975, First Lady Apodaca founded and opened the Governor's Gallery in the New Mexico State Capitol, featuring the works of Georgia O'Keeffe in the inaugural exhibition.

Apodaca also served as Secretary of the New Mexico Department of Cultural Affairs, then known as the Office of Cultural Affairs, under both Governor Toney Anaya and Governor Garrey Carruthers from 1985 to 1987, where she oversaw the opening of the New Mexico Museum of Natural History and Science. She then moved to Washington D.C., serving in the United States Department of the Treasury from 1993 to 2001, as well as the DC Commission on the Arts and Humanities and the White House Millennium Commission.

== Biography ==
Clara Melendres was born in 1934 in Doña Ana, New Mexico. She is a 14th-generation New Mexican and member of a prominent Hispanic family who lived in the state prior to the Treaty of Guadalupe Hidalgo, which ceded the area to the United States. Apodaca was raised in Las Cruces, New Mexico, and an unincorporated area of Doña Ana outside of the city, and graduated from Union High School (now known as Las Cruces High School) as class homecoming queen. She enrolled at New Mexico College of Agriculture and Mechanic Arts (present-day New Mexico State University) to pursue secondary education, but dropped out in June 1955 at the end of her Junior year to get a job.

In 1956, Apodaca was hired as a stenographer for the United States Army Signal Corps's supply department on the White Sands Proving Ground, now called the White Sands Missile Range. In March 1956, Apodaca was crowned "Miss Nike 1956" in the White Sands Proving Ground's beauty pageant. One month later, she competed as White Sands' beauty contestant at the Truth or Consequences Fiesta. She was a pageant finalist at the event hosted by actor Tab Hunter, but came in second place to Beverly Sikes of Texas.

An old high school boyfriend, Jerry Apodaca, heard she was competing at the Truth or Consequences Fiesta. They reconnected and married on August 18, 1956, at a wedding held at Saint Genevieve's Catholic Church in Las Cruces. The couple moved to Albuquerque, so Jerry Apodaca could finish college, and had five children over the next seven years. The family returned to Las Cruces in 1961, where Clara Apodaca raised the children and worked in the family insurance business, but she was unable to finish her bachelor's degree at New Mexico State University.

=== First Lady of New Mexico ===
Apodaca entered politics while campaigning on behalf of her husband, who was elected to the first of four consecutive terms in the New Mexico House of Representatives in 1966. Jerry Apodaca was elected governor in the 1974 New Mexico gubernatorial election, becoming the state's first Hispanic governor since Octaviano Ambrosio Larrazolo in 1921.

Clara Apodaca served as New Mexico's first lady from 1975 to 1979. The new first lady sought to promote the arts and soon came across a potential project within the New Mexico State Capitol. In early 1975, Apodaca noticed an underused "governor's reception area" on the fourth floor of the Capitol building, which was mostly used as a seating area by journalists and other members of the media. Apodaca conceived the idea of a new, potential art gallery in fourth floor space. Though it was called the "governor's reception area", the room actually belonged to the New Mexico Legislature, which had to grant the first lady permission to convert it into a gallery. Apodaca quickly received permission from the Legislature and worked to renovate it in just a few months.

First Lady Apodaca's Governor's Gallery on the fourth floor formally opened in April 1975, just a few months after she had conceptualized the idea. The Governor's Gallery's inaugural opening exhibition featured the works of Georgia O'Keeffe, one of the country's most famous painters at the time. O'Keeffe, who was in her 80s at the time. agreed to participate in the exhibition due to her admiration for New Mexico and a personal phone call from Governor Jerry Apodaca at the first lady's behest. Georgia O'Keeffe oversaw the installation of her works, which was opened the public for six weeks. The artist attended the gallery's opening in-person, to the surprise of some observers, and worked the reception line for two hours. Apodaca supervised more than 40 art shows and exhibitions at the Governor's Gallery during her four years as first lady, including a solo exhibition of works by Chiricahua sculptor Allan Houser later in 1975. The Governor's Gallery remains open and active to the present day. Apodaca estimates that millions of visitors have visited the gallery since its opening in 1975. A plaque commemorating Clara Apodaca as the gallery's founder has been installed.

Elsewhere in the Capitol building, Clare Apodaca started a series a "brown bag" concerts and recitals in the rotunda for employees, elected officials, and visitors, featuring a variety of musical genres and dances, including ballet, bluegrass, flamenco, jazz, opera, and musical theater productions. As first lady, Apodaca also served on the women's board for the Museum of New Mexico and the Santa Fe Festival of the Arts' advisory council. She also established the ""First Lady's Day for the Physically Challenged" at the New Mexico State Fair beginning in 1977.

=== Career ===
Clara Apodaca served as the Secretary of New Mexico Department of Cultural Affairs. then called the Office of Cultural Affairs, in the cabinets of Governors Toney Anaya and Garrey Carruthers from July 1985 to July 1987. As secretary, Apodaca oversaw the New Mexico state-owned museums system and the state park system. She created the state museums' new admission system, which charged visitors an entrance fee. The new admission fees were opposed by her boss, Governor Anaya, but had been mandated by the New Mexico Legislature to pay for the upkeep of the museums. Clara Apodaca also oversaw the opening of the New Mexico Museum of Natural History and Science in Albuquerque in 1986.

Apodaca moved to Washington D.C., where she lived for 18 years. She joined the Clinton administration as a special advisor to the United States Secretary of the Treasury from 1993 to 2001. Apodaca also served as a commissioner of the DC Commission on the Arts and Humanities and was appointed to the Millennium Commission by First Lady of the United States Hillary Clinton.

Jerry and Clara Apodaca divorced during the 1990s after a 40-year marriage.

Clara Apodaca returned to New Mexico in the early 2000s. She served as the president and CEO of the National Hispanic Cultural Center Foundation from 2005 until her retirement in 2012.

She remained active following her retirement. She continued to serve on five boards of directors, as of 2017, including the Albuquerque Film and Music Experience Foundation and the Hitachi Foundation.
