= The Diag =

Square at the University of Michigan Central Campus

Coordinates: 42.27666°N 83.73872°W

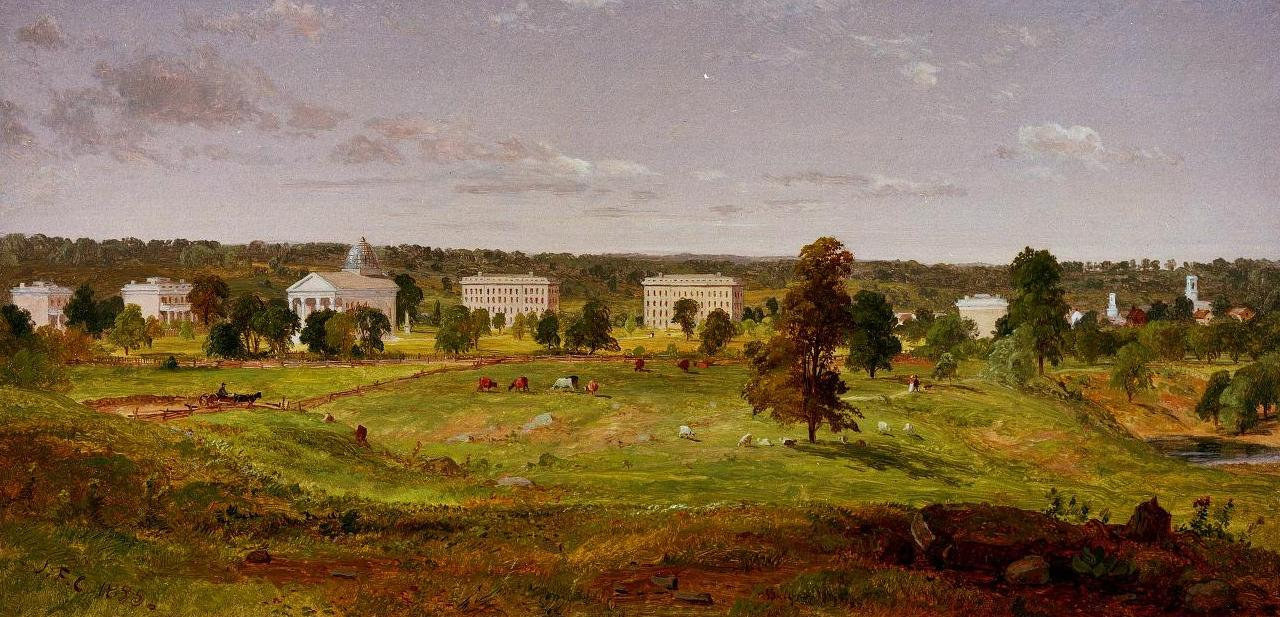
University of Michigan (1855) by Jasper Francis Cropsey, depicting a view of The Diag in 1847 from east to west. From left to right: the Engineering Building (1839–1922), the President’s House (1839), the Medical Building (1848–1914), South College (1849–1950), and Mason Hall (1841–1950)

The Diag (/ˈdaɪ.æɡ/ DY-ag) is the oldest area of the University of Michigan campus in Ann Arbor, Michigan. Originally referred to as the Diagonal Green, the Diag acquires its name from the multitude of sidewalks that traverse or border it in diagonal directions. Numerous historic buildings of the university are positioned in proximity to the Diag.

== History ==
In April 2008, spring commencement ceremonies were held at The Diag, as Michigan Stadium was undergoing construction. In April 2024, The Diag was one of the sites for the nationwide pro-Palestinian encampment.

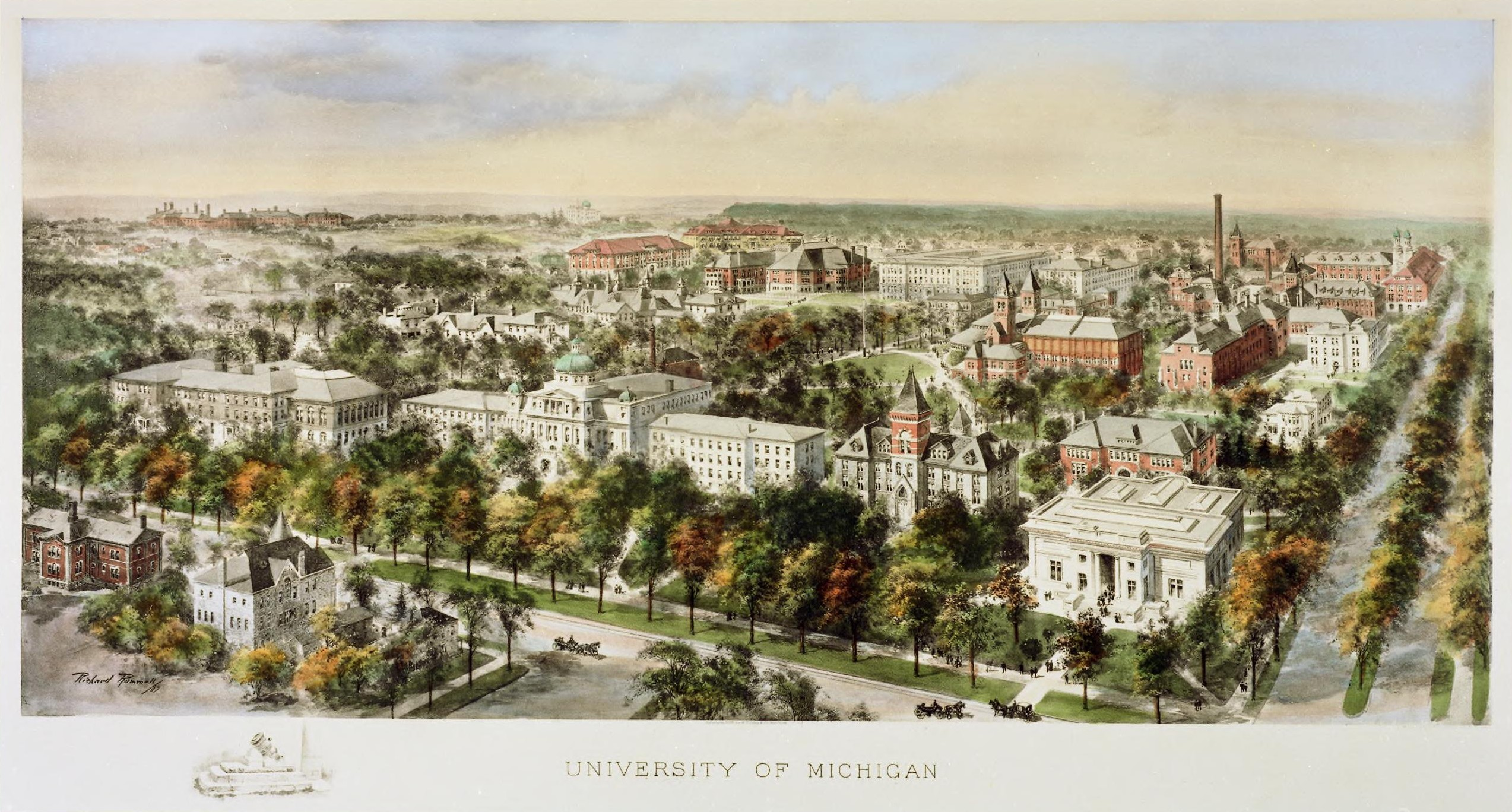
A hand-colored lithograph depicting a view of The Diag by Richard Rummell in 1907

== Current buildings ==
Name	Photograph	Year Built	Architect	Description
President’s House (Southwest Professors' House)		1839	Isaac Thompson and Harpin Lum (supervisors)	One of four faculty residences which were the first structures built for the university on the campus.
Tappan Hall		1893	Spier & Rohns	
Samuel Trask Dana Building		1901	Spier & Rohns	
West Engineering Building		1904	Mason and Kahn	
Alumni Memorial Hall		1908	Donaldson and Meier	
Chemistry Building		1910	Smith, Hinchman and Grylls	
Edward Henry Kraus Building		1915	Albert Kahn	
General Library (Hatcher Graduate Library)		1920	Albert Kahn	Built on the site of the Old Library, the new library incorporated two fireproof bookstacks from the older building.
William L. Clements Library		1923	Albert Kahn	
Angell Hall		1924	Albert Kahn	
East Physics Building		1924	Albert Kahn	
Mason Hall (addition to the Angell Hall complex)		1952	Smith, Hinchman and Grylls	
Haven Hall (addition to the Angell Hall complex)		1952	Smith, Hinchman and Grylls	
Harold T. and Vivian B. Shapiro Library		1958	Albert Kahn Associates	
South Stacks addition to Hatcher Graduate Library		1970	Albert Kahn Associates	
Willard Henry Dow Laboratory (major addition to Chemistry Building)		1988	Harley, Ellington, Pierce, Yee Associates	
Harrison M. Randall Laboratory (major addition to East Physics Building)		1995	Luckenbach/Ziegelman	
Tisch Hall (addition to Angell Hall)		1996	Albert Kahn Associates	
Museum of Art Addition		2008	Allied Works Architecture Inc.	

== Former buildings ==
Name	Photograph	In Use	Architect	Description
Old Engineering Building (Southeast Professors' House)		1839–1922	Isaac Thompson and Harpin Lum (supervisors)	One of four faculty residences which were the first structures built for the university on the campus. Used by the School of Engineering, 1892-1922. Building removed in 1922 to make room for the Clements Library
Northwest Professors' House (Homeopathic Medical School Building)		1839–1914	Isaac Thompson and Harpin Lum (supervisors)	Used as a hospital and classroom building for the Homeopathic Medical School from 1875 to 1890. Building removed in 1914 to make way for the Natural Sciences Building.
Northeast Professors' House (Old Dental School Building)		1839–1908	Isaac Thompson and Harpin Lum (supervisors)	Used by the School of Dentistry from 1891 to 1908. Building razed in 1908 to make room for the new Chemistry Building.
Old Mason Hall		1841–1950	Attributed to Alexander Jackson Davis	Michigan's first instructional building on the Ann Arbor campus, Mason Hall was completed in 1841 and immediately occupied by the newly established College of Literature, Science, and the Arts. Its design inspired North Hall (1851) in Madison, Wisconsin. The architect is unknown, though the structure as built bears some resemblance to other of Alexander Jackson Davis' projects. Located on the Diag, at the current site of Angell Hall, it was demolishedin 1950.
Old Medical Building		1848–1914	Silas H. Douglas (supervisor)	Served as the main instructional building for the Medical School until the construction of the West Medical Building in 1903. Razed in 1914. The Randall Physics Laboratory currently stands on the site of the Old Medical Building.
South College		1849–1950	Attributed to Alexander Jackson Davis	Nearly identical to Mason Hall, from which it was separated by a space of 150 feet
Chemical Laboratory		1856–1980	Albert Jordan	Built in 1856. First chemical laboratory at a state university. Building served medical students and others as both laboratory and classroom. Situated just west and south of the original medical building. In 1908, it became the Economics Building with Pharmacology occupying the north wing. Destroyed by an arson fire Christmas Eve 1981.
Law Building (Old Haven Hall)		1863–1950	Jordan & Anderson	Built in 1863 on the corner of State Street and North University Avenue. In 1863 it was occupied by the Law School, the University Chapel (until 1873) and the General Library (until 1883). It was destroyed by fire in 1950.
University Hall		1871–1950	E. S. Jennison	Central wing built in 1871. Original dome removed and new dome installed in 1896. Demolished in 1950.
University Museum (Romance Languages Building)		1880–1957	William Le Baron Jenney	Originally University Museum, built 1880-1881. Housed the university's collections in anthropology and natural history until 1928 when the new Museums Building was constructed. Housed the Department of Romance Languages after 1928. Building razed in 1958. Museum of Art currently stands on the site of the old University Museum.
Old Library		1881–1918	Ware and Van Brunt	Completed in 1883. An addition was built to the south in 1898. The 1883 portion was torn down in 1918.
Engineering Shops (West Engineering Annex)		1885–1956	Gordon W. Lloyd	Constructed in 1885, occupied in 1886. In 1926, the building name was changed from Engineering Shops to West Engineering Annex. Removed in 1956 to allow for the construction of the Undergraduate Library.
West Physics Building		1888–1966	Pond and Pond	Built 1887-1888. Burned during demolition in the summer of 1966
Anatomical Laboratory		1889–1903	Gordon W. Lloyd	Authorized in 1887, construction completed in 1889. The building stood on the eastern edge of the Diag, directly south of the Old Medical Building. Demolished in 1903.
Central Heating Plant		1894–1959	A. Harvey's Sons Manufacturing Company, Ltd.	Built in 1894. Also called Central Heating Plant and University Heating Plant. Used as an Engineering laboratory from 1914-1923. Then used by the R.O.T.C. as their headquarters from 1923-1942. Demolished in 1959.
Waterman Gymnasium		1894–1977	E.W. Arnold	Built in 1894. Funded by a challenge grant of $20,000.00 by Joshua W. Waterman of Detroit with contributions from others. Demolished in 1977.
Barbour Gymnasium		1896–1977	John Scott and Co.	Built during 1895 and 1896. Demolished in 1977.
