= Jerry Apodaca =

American politician (1934–2023)

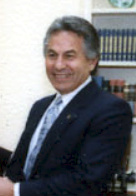

Chair of the President's Council on Physical Fitness and Sports
- In office July 26, 1978 – July 29, 1980
- President: Jimmy Carter
- Preceded by: Jim Lovell
- Succeeded by: Al McGuire

24th Governor of New Mexico
- In office January 1, 1975 – January 1, 1979
- Lieutenant: Robert E. Ferguson
- Preceded by: Bruce King
- Succeeded by: Bruce King

Personal details
- Born: October 3, 1934 Las Cruces, New Mexico, U.S.
- Died: April 26, 2023 (aged 88) Santa Fe, New Mexico, U.S.
- Party: Democratic
- Spouse: Clara Melendres (m. 1956)
- Education: University of New Mexico, Albuquerque (BS)

Military service
- Allegiance: United States
- Branch/service: United States Marine Corps
- Unit: United States Marine Corps Reserve

Jerry Apodaca (October 3, 1934 – April 26, 2023) was an American politician of the Democratic Party who served as the 24th governor of New Mexico from 1975 to 1979 and chair of the president's council on physical fitness and sports from 1978 to 1980.

== Early life ==
Apodaca graduated from the University of New Mexico in 1956 with a bachelor of science degree; he was a member of the Phi Delta Theta fraternity. Apodaca would later enter the insurance business.

== Politics ==
In 1965, he was elected to the New Mexico Senate, in which he served for four two-year terms from 1966 to 1974. Apodaca was elected governor of New Mexico as a Democrat in 1974, becoming the first Hispanic governor in the U.S. since 1918, along with neighboring Arizona Governor Raúl Héctor Castro, who was also elected that year. Apodaca narrowly defeated his Republican opponent, Joe Skeen, later a long-term member of the United States House of Representatives from New Mexico. During the campaign, Jimmy Carter, the outgoing governor of Georgia and future President of the United States, came to New Mexico to stump for Apodaca.

Apodaca reorganized the New Mexico state government to create a cabinet system with twelve departments. He consolidated agencies and abolished several boards and commissions. Apodaca's reorganization plan was passed by the legislature in March 1977, but it did not go into effect officially until April 1978. It was presented as a more efficient, effective, and rational means of governing state agencies without the contradictions of state commissions formed by the legislature often in cross purposes. One of the first appointments Apodaca made was Dr. Charles Becknell to be director of the Governor's Council on Criminal Justice Planning. Between 1976 and 1977 the planning staff selected by Dr. Becknell, were ideologically committed to rehabilitation and inmate rights. One of the first significant initiatives of the Governor's Council under Becknell's leadership was the development of Criminal Justice Standards and Goals for New Mexico that were based on National Standards and Goals initiated by the federal government in 1973. This attention to national standards would put New Mexico in a better position to receive federal funds. However, that was the very reason it was opposed by local prison administrators. Receiving money from the federal government meant paperwork requiring accountability for how the money was spent as well as matching funds a conservative legislature resisted. Coinciding with the 1976 Standards and Goals Project was a second major initiative of the Governor's Council under the leadership of Becknell. A comprehensive Corrections Master Plan for New Mexico was developed with a consulting group, Approach Associates, from Berkeley, California. The Corrections Master Plan called for a coordinated corrections system, increased programming for rehabilitation, greater emphasis on community-based corrections, and a comprehensive classification system.

The corner stone of the Corrections Master Plan was development of an Intensive Classification Center (ICC). The ICC would give the central corrections agency control over inmate movement, which by law had been controlled exclusively by the administration of the Penitentiary of New Mexico. The ICC would be empowered to classify inmates identified as first time in prison and convicted of violent or non-violent crimes. This would prevent housing violent criminals with non-violent criminals and would be the first step in assuring inmate safety, at least in their cells. The ICC would be in the position to manage inmate population over the whole state, avoiding overcrowding in any one institution.

The Intensive Classification Center (ICC) was opposed by the Corrections Commission chaired by Bud Richards. Before Governor Apodaca left as governor he was able to negotiate 8 million dollars approved for construction of the ICC. The bill that was drafted for legislative approval asked for $13.4 million. The Chairman of the Corrections Commission, contacted state Senator Aubrey Dunn to tell him that the Corrections Commission (one of the commissions that would lose this policy making decision power in 3 months under reorganization) would not approve this allocation of funds. Charles Becknell called Bud Richards and said, "Bud, you're killing our ICC" and Commission Chairman Richards said, "You're damn right, Charles, I'm killing it."...so the ICC was killed." As Colvin states in his book in conclusion to this attempt for prisoner classification and population management on page 125, "This incident underscores the conflict-filled atmosphere under which the corrections administration was operating during 1977 and 1978."

=== Post–governorship ===
In 1978, President Carter appointed Apodaca, who was constitutionally ineligible to seek reelection as governor, as the chairman of the President's Council on Physical Fitness. After his term as governor, Apodaca became involved in publishing Hispanic-audience periodicals.

In 1982, he attempted to run for the United States Senate for the seat held by then-incumbent Harrison Schmitt, a Republican and former astronaut. However, he missed his chance in the Democratic primary when then-Attorney General Jeff Bingaman defeated him soundly 51%-39%. The primary had been largely amicable as Apodaca and Bingaman concentrated their fire on Schmitt. Bingaman would go onto defeat Schmitt and serve till January 2013, when he retired after five successive statewide wins.

In 1998, made another unsuccessful attempt at political redemption. Apodaca ran against the former Mayor of Albuquerque Martin Chavez, then State Representative Gary King, and State Auditor Roger Vigil, in the Democratic primary for Governor. Apodaca received only 10% of the vote.

Apodaca was a member of the University of New Mexico Board of Regents from 1985 to 1991.

== Death ==
On April 26, 2023, Apodaca died in Santa Fe, New Mexico, after years of declining health. He was 88.

== Legacy ==
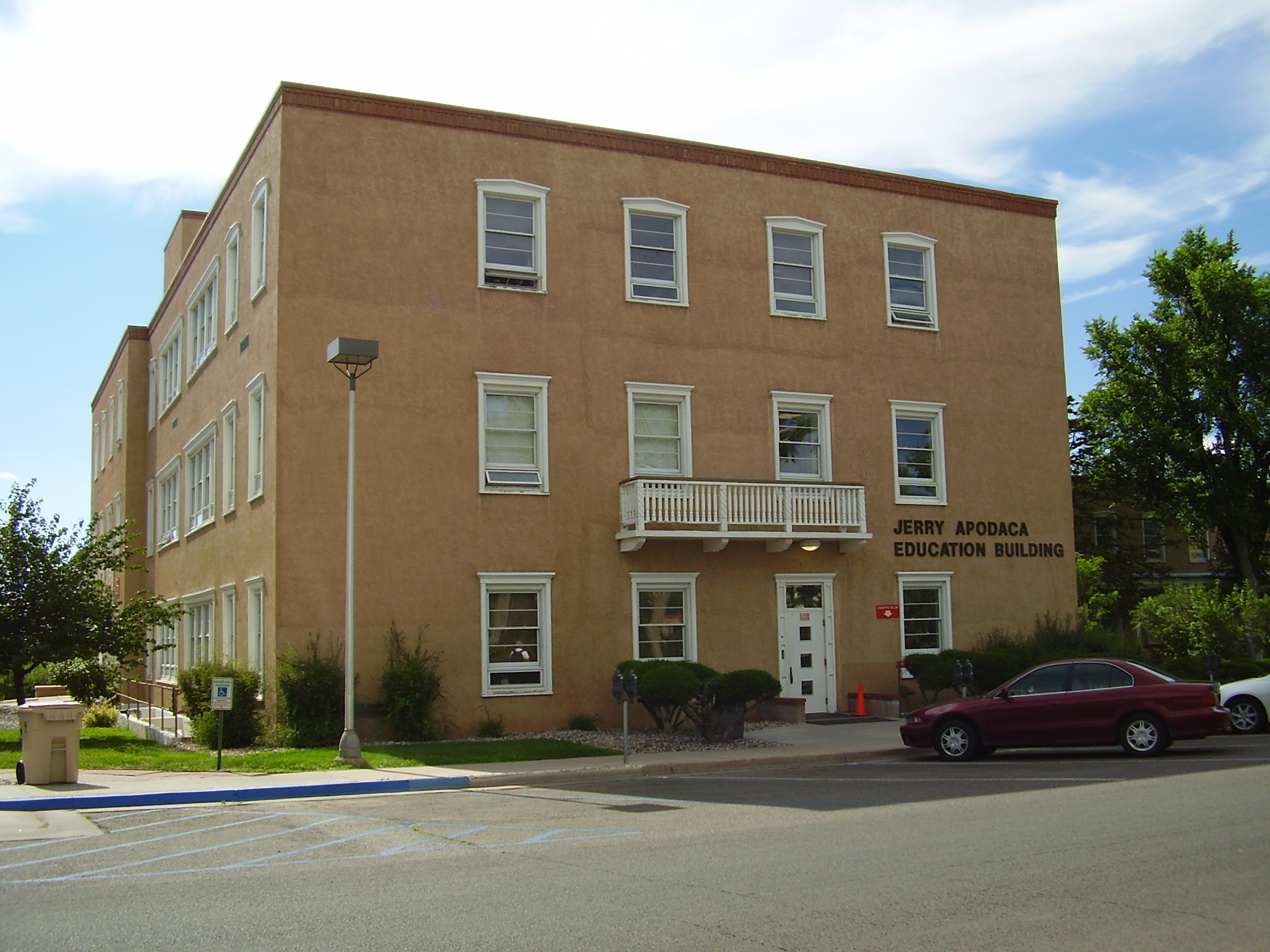
Jerry Apodaca Education Building, the headquarters of the New Mexico Department of Education in Santa Fe, New Mexico.

In 2004, the headquarters building of the New Mexico Department of Education was renamed for Apodaca.

One of the centers of the Ben Luján Leadership and Public Policy Institute as of 2009 is called the Jerry Apodaca Public Policy Center.

== See also ==
- List of minority governors and lieutenant governors in the United States

Party political offices
Preceded by Bruce King	Democratic nominee for Governor of New Mexico; 1974	Succeeded by Bruce King
Political offices
Preceded by Bruce King	Governor of New Mexico; 1975–1979	Succeeded by Bruce King
