= 1974 New Mexico gubernatorial election =

- November 5, 1974
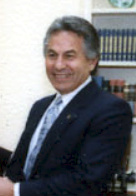

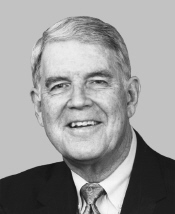
Nominee	Jerry Apodaca	Joe Skeen
Party	Democratic	Republican
Popular vote	164,172	160,430
Percentage	49.94%	48.80%
- County results Apodaca: 50–60% 60–70% 70–80% Skeen: 50–60% 60–70%
Governor before election
Bruce King
Democratic
Elected Governor
Jerry Apodaca
Democratic

The 1974 New Mexico gubernatorial election took place on November 5, 1974, to elect the governor of New Mexico. Due to term limits, incumbent Democrat Bruce King was ineligible to seek a second term as governor. Democrat Jerry Apodaca narrowly defeated Republican Joe Skeen. This election saw Hidalgo County vote for a Republican gubernatorial candidate for the first time.

== Primary election ==
=== Democratic primary ===
The Democratic primary was won by State Senator Jerry Apodaca.

==== Results ====
Democratic primary results
Party	Candidate	Votes	%
Democratic	Jerry Apodaca	45,477	30.58%
Democratic	Tibo J. Chavez	35,090	23.61%
Democratic	Odis Echols	25,760	17.33%
Democratic	Bobby M. Mayfield	22,806	15.35%
Democratic	Drew Cloud	12,707	8.55%
Democratic	Boston Witt	6,798	4.57%
Total votes		148,636	100.00%

=== Republican primary ===
The Republican primary was won by former State Senator Joe Skeen.

==== Results ====
Republican primary results
Party	Candidate	Votes	%
Republican	Joe Skeen	28,227	55.43%
Republican	John P. Eastham	15,003	29.46%
Republican	James L. Hughes	4,758	9.34%
Republican	Walter E. Bruce	2,913	5.72%
Republican	Scattering	26	0.05%
Total votes		50,927	100.00%

== General election ==
=== Results ===
1974 New Mexico gubernatorial election
Party	Candidate	Votes	%	±%
Democratic	Jerry Apodaca	164,172	49.94%	−1.32%
Republican	Joe Skeen	160,430	48.80%	+2.43%
American Independent	Gene Gonzales	4,140	1.24%	
	Scattering	78	0.02%	
Majority		3,742	1.14%	
Total votes		328,742	100.00%	
Democratic hold		Swing	-3.75%	

=== Results by county ===
County	Jerry Apodaca Democratic		Joe Skeen Republican		Gene Gonzales AIP		Margin		Total votes cast
County	#	%	#	%	#	%	#	%	Total votes cast
Bernalillo	49,287	45.65%	56,799	52.61%	1,820	1.69%	-7,512	-6.96%	107,960 (Note: Includes 54 write-in votes)
Catron	433	40.73%	617	58.04%	13	1.22%	-184	-17.31%	1,063
Chaves	5,068	34.04%	9,744	65.44%	75	0.50%	-4,676	-31.40%	14,890 (Note: Includes 3 write-in votes)
Colfax	1,909	46.87%	2,128	52.25%	34	0.83%	-219	-5.38%	4,073 (Note: Includes 2 write-in votes)
Curry	2,828	35.83%	5,014	63.53%	50	0.63%	-2,186	-27.70%	7,892
De Baca	428	41.88%	588	57.53%	6	0.59%	-160	-15.66%	1,022
Doña Ana	11,511	55.49%	9,007	43.42%	225	1.08%	2,504	12.07%	20,745
Eddy	7,162	52.08%	6,517	47.39%	74	0.54%	645	4.69%	13,753
Grant	4,117	54.25%	3,395	44.74%	77	1.01%	722	9.51%	7,589
Guadalupe	1,550	71.40%	606	27.91%	15	0.69%	944	43.48%	2,171
Harding	254	41.23%	360	58.44%	2	0.32%	-106	-17.21%	616
Hidalgo	629	47.19%	688	51.61%	16	1.20%	-59	-4.43%	1,333
Lea	4,389	39.48%	6,666	59.96%	62	0.56%	-2,277	-20.48%	11,117
Lincoln	1,168	35.95%	2,049	63.07%	31	0.95%	-881	-27.12%	3,249 (Note: Includes 1 write-in vote)
Los Alamos	2,640	39.41%	3,932	58.70%	126	1.88%	-1,292	-19.29%	6,699
Luna	2,005	43.25%	2,578	55.61%	53	1.14%	-573	-12.36%	4,636
McKinley	5,019	60.87%	3,021	36.64%	206	2.50%	1,998	24.23%	8,246
Mora	1,516	62.52%	902	37.20%	7	0.29%	614	25.32%	2,425
Otero	4,167	47.60%	4,478	51.15%	109	1.25%	-311	-3.55%	8,754
Quay	1,609	42.20%	2,174	57.02%	30	0.79%	-565	-14.82%	3,813
Rio Arriba	7,210	78.10%	1,974	21.38%	48	0.52%	5,236	56.72%	9,232
Roosevelt	1,912	36.44%	3,296	62.82%	39	0.74%	-1,384	-26.38%	5,247
San Juan	5,855	40.42%	8,382	57.86%	249	1.72%	-2,527	-17.44%	14,487
San Miguel	5,495	69.33%	2,354	29.70%	77	0.97%	3,141	39.63%	7,926
Sandoval	4,069	61.07%	2,476	37.16%	116	1.74%	1,593	23.91%	6,663
Santa Fe	14,154	64.15%	7,706	34.92%	193	0.87%	6,448	29.22%	22,065 (Note: Includes 12 write-in votes)
Sierra	924	37.33%	1,514	61.17%	37	1.49%	-590	-23.84%	2,475
Socorro	2,420	58.41%	1,689	40.77%	34	0.82%	731	17.64%	4,143
Taos	4,618	73.30%	1,635	25.95%	47	0.75%	2,983	47.35%	6,300
Torrance	1,152	44.39%	1,415	54.53%	28	1.08%	-263	-10.13%	2,595
Union	783	38.74%	1,206	59.67%	32	1.58%	-423	-20.93%	2,021
Valencia	7,891	58.27%	5,520	40.76%	131	0.97%	2,371	17.51%	13,542
Total	164,172	49.94%	160,430	48.80%	4,062	1.24%	3,742	1.14%	328,742

==== Counties that flipped from Republican to Democratic ====
- Socorro

==== Counties that flipped from Democratic to Republican ====
- Catron
- Colfax
- Curry
- De Baca
- Hidalgo
- Lea
- Luna
- Otero
- Quay
- Roosevelt
- Sierra
- Torrance
- Union
