= Columbian School (Raton, New Mexico) =

- U.S. National Register of Historic Places
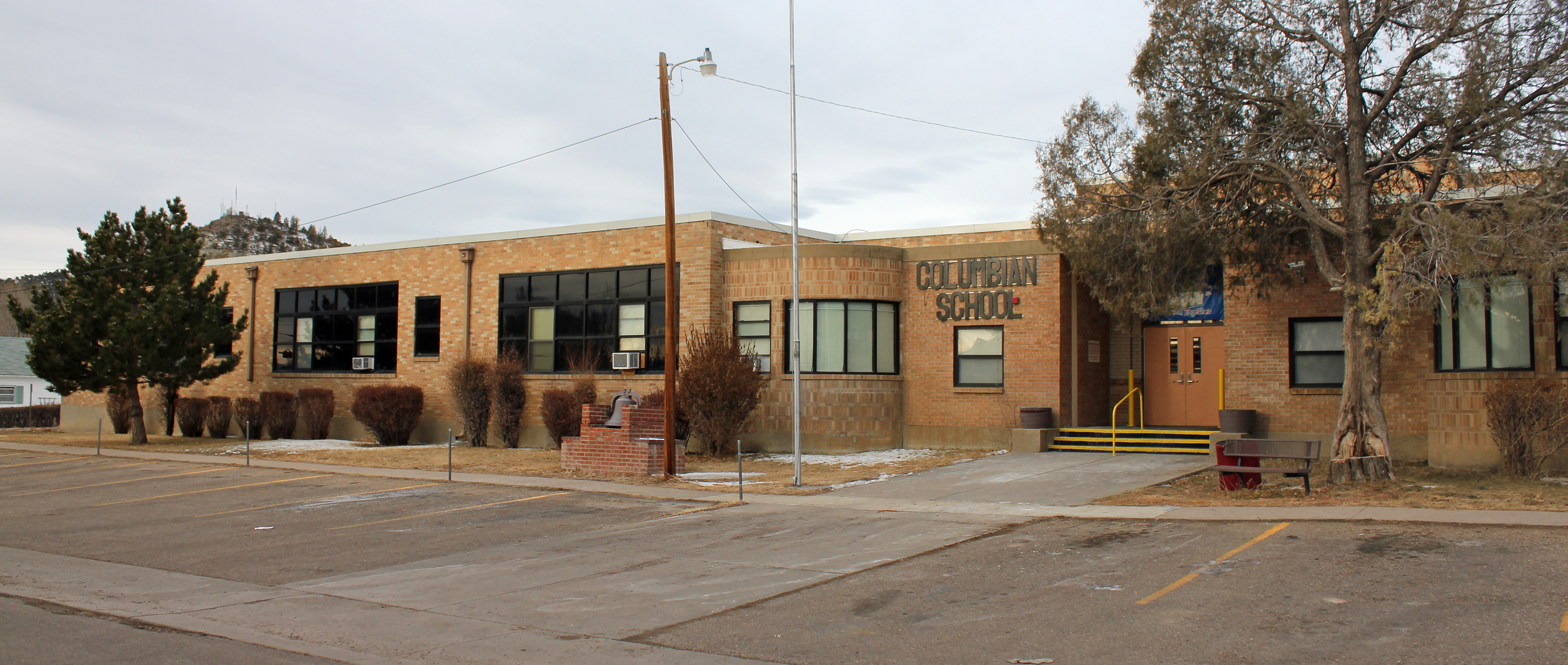

- Location within New Mexico
- Location: 700 N. 2nd St., Raton, New Mexico
- Coordinates: 36°54′36″N 104°26′13″W
- Area: 1 acre (0.40 ha)
- Built: 1939
- Architect: Willard C. Kruger
- Architectural style: Moderne
- MPS: New Deal in New Mexico MPS
- NRHP reference No.: 96000261
- Added to NRHP: March 15, 1996

The Columbian School in Raton, New Mexico, at 700 N. 2nd St., is a Moderne-style school which was built as a Works Progress Administration project in 1939. It was listed on the National Register of Historic Places in 1996.

It was designed by architect Willard C. Kruger. Additions to the school in 1950 and 1970 do not detract from the historical character.
