= Longfellow School (Raton, New Mexico) =

- U.S. National Register of Historic Places
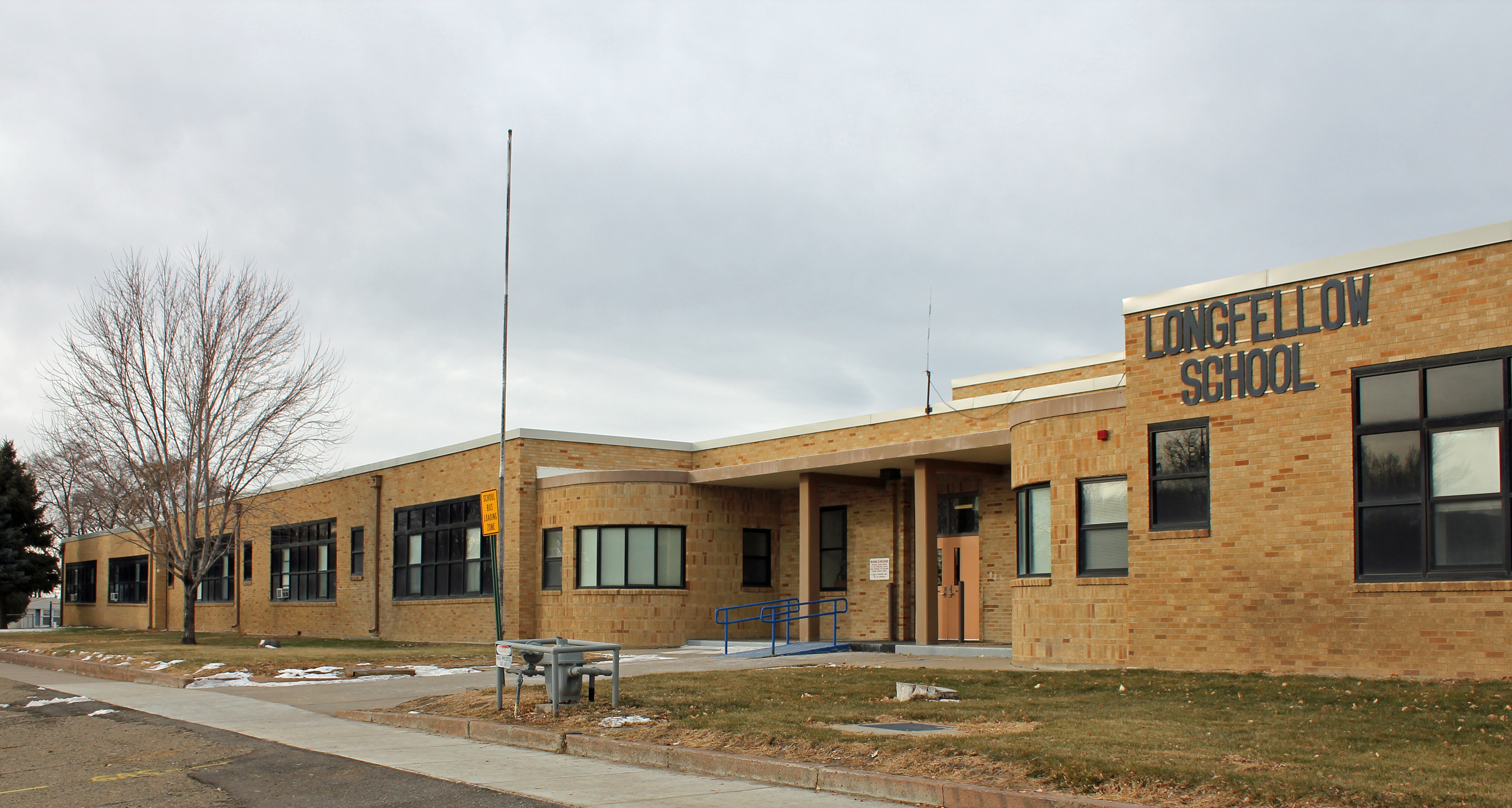

- Location within New Mexico
- Location: 700 E. 4th ST., Raton, New Mexico
- Coordinates: 36°53′53″N 104°26′04″W
- Area: 0.1 acres (0.040 ha)
- Built: 1939
- Architect: Kruger, William C.
- Architectural style: Moderne
- MPS: New Deal in New Mexico MPS
- NRHP reference No.: 96000262
- Added to NRHP: March 15, 1996

The Longfellow School in Raton, New Mexico, at 700 E. 4th St., is an elementary school which was built in 1939 as a Works Progress Administration project. It was listed on the National Register of Historic Places in 1996.

It was designed by architect William C. Kruger in a modest Moderne style. It is a one-story brick building. It was extended by additions of four classrooms to the south in the 1960s and a library to the rear, but these do not detract from its historic character.
