= Willard C. Kruger =

American architect

Willard Carl Kruger (1910–1984) was an American architect born in Sperry, Texas, who grew up in Raton, New Mexico. He founded W. C. Kruger and Associates, which was an American architectural and engineering firm, based in Santa Fe, New Mexico. The firm worked mostly in New Mexico, and designed a number of Los Alamos buildings, as part of the Manhattan Project.

Kruger graduated with an engineering degree from Oklahoma Agricultural and Mechanical College in 1934, then worked in New Mexico's State Planning division. He served as New Mexico's "State Architect" from 1936 to 1937. Kruger headed the New Mexico state's group of architects within the Federal Emergency Relief Administration (FERA) New Deal agency, in Santa Fe.

He was several times later misidentified as "William C. Kruger". (Note: He was misidentified in NRIS database as "William C. Kruger" in listings for Clayton Public Schools Historic District, Columbian School (Raton, New Mexico), and Longfellow School (Raton, New Mexico).)

== Notable works ==
A number of works by Kruger or his firm are listed on the National Register of Historic Places, as noted.

- Clayton High School and Junior High School (1935–41), Clayton, New Mexico, NRHP-listed
- Carrie Tingley Hospital for Crippled Children (1937), Truth or Consequences, New Mexico, NRHP-listed
- Clayton Public Library (1939), Clayton, New Mexico, NRHP-listed
- Columbian School (1939), Raton, New Mexico, NRHP-listed
- Los Alamos United States Post Office (1948), Los Alamos, NRHP-listed
- Longfellow School (1939), Raton, New Mexico, NRHP-listed
- Raton Junior-Senior High School (1939), Raton, New Mexico, NRHP-listed
- Las Vegas Municipal Building (1940), Las Vegas, New Mexico, NRHP-listed
- Old New Mexico State Capitol expansion and remodeling (1949–1952), Santa Fe, New Mexico, NRHP-listed
- Tierra Amarilla Air Force Station (1950–52), near Tierra Amarilla, New Mexico, NRHP-listed
- New Mexico Bank & Trust Building (1961), Albuquerque, New Mexico
- New Mexico State Capitol (1966), Santa Fe, New Mexico
- University of New Mexico Humanities Building (1974), Albuquerque, New Mexico
