= Clayton Public Schools Historic District =

Historic district in New Mexico, United States

- U.S. National Register of Historic Places
- U.S. Historic district
- NM State Register of Cultural Properties
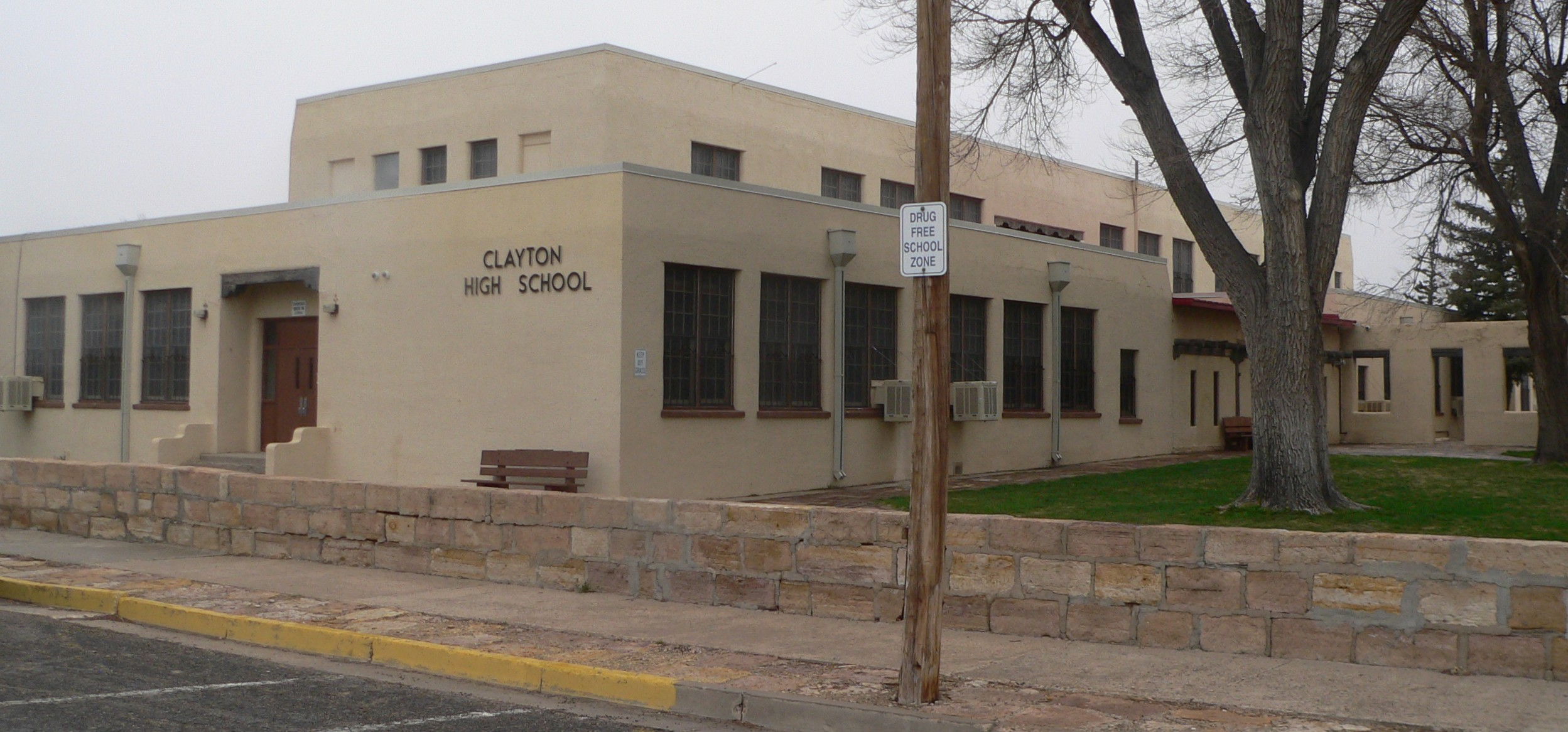
- High-school building

- Location within New Mexico
- Location: Four blocks in SE Clayton centered on 6th and Cedar Sts., Clayton, New Mexico
- Coordinates: 36°26′59″N 103°10′33″W
- Area: 7 acres (2.8 ha)
- Built: 1935
- Built by: WPA
- Architect: William C. Kruger
- Architectural style: Pueblo Revival
- MPS: New Deal in New Mexico MPS
- NRHP reference No.: 96000269
- NMSRCP No.: 1623

Significant dates
- Added to NRHP: March 15, 1996
- Designated NMSRCP: January 26, 1996

The Clayton Public Schools Historic District is a 7-acre (2.8 ha) historic district consisting of four blocks in southeast Clayton, New Mexico, centered on 6th and Cedar Sts. Also known as Clayton Public Schools-Campus No. 1, its oldest buildings were built in 1935. It includes work designed by Willard C. Kruger and other New Mexico architects in Pueblo Revival style and built by the Works Progress Administration. It was listed on the National Register of Historic Places in 1996; the listing included seven contributing buildings, four contributing structure and four other contributing sites.

Kruger, who served as "State Architect" of New Mexico for one year, also led the state's FERA group of architects. In the project termed "perhaps the most remarkable concentration of WPA-funded school buildings", Kruger's group "designed an entire four-block junior and senior high school complex for the town of Clayton". The project eventually included a high school, a junior high school, agricultural and manual arts buildings, a gymnasium/auditorium, a football stadium, and more facilities. The project was embraced by Raymond Huff, schools superintendent, who also found ways to use Works Project Administration funding for related arts and services projects. For Union County, hard-hit by Dust Bowl storms, the project was important and provided work at one point or another for 6,000 out of the 10,000 population.

== See also ==
- National Register of Historic Places listings in Union County, New Mexico
