= Los Alamos United States Post Office =

- United States Post Office-Los Alamos, New Mexico
- U.S. National Register of Historic Places
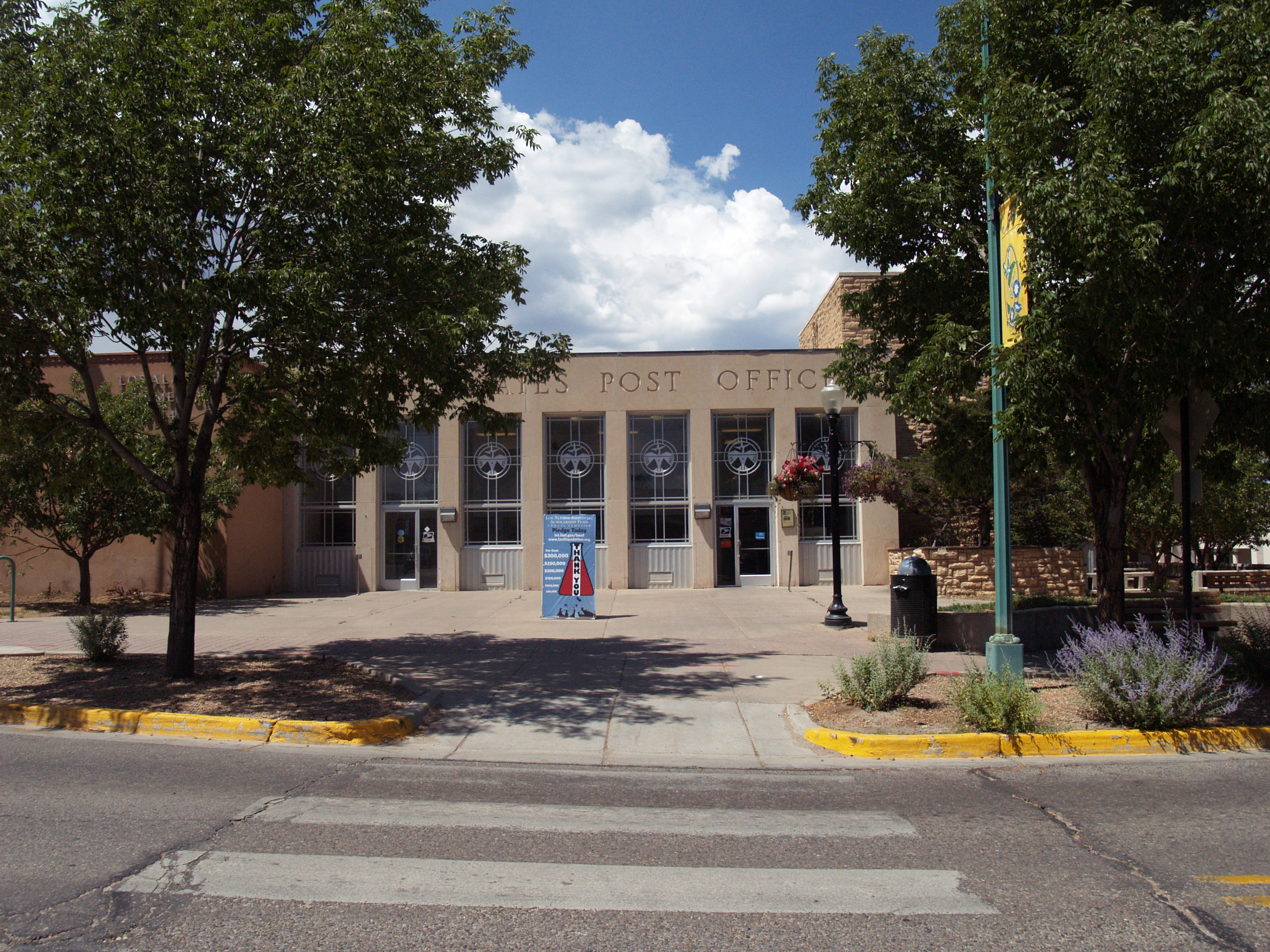

- Location within New Mexico
- Location: 199 Central Park Sq., Los Alamos, New Mexico
- Coordinates: 35°52′54″N 106°18′04″W
- Built: 1948
- Architect: W.C. Kruger and Associates
- NRHP reference No.: 15000493
- Added to NRHP: August 3, 2015

The Los Alamos United States Post Office, at 199 Central Park Sq. in Los Alamos, New Mexico, was listed on the National Register of Historic Places in 2015 as United States Post Office-Los Alamos, New Mexico.

It was built in 1948, as part of a Community Center funded by the U.S. Atomic Energy Commission (AEC). Control of the property was transferred to the postal service in 1947, but ownership was not transferred to the USPS until 1963. The post office has a series of aluminum ornamental thunderbird grilles in its windows.

It was listed after 11 years of effort.

It was designed by architects W.C. Kruger and Associates and is a one-story and basement building with a mixture of Modern and Territorial Revival design.
