= Clayton Public Library =

Historic building in New Mexico, U.S.

- U.S. National Register of Historic Places
- NM State Register of Cultural Properties
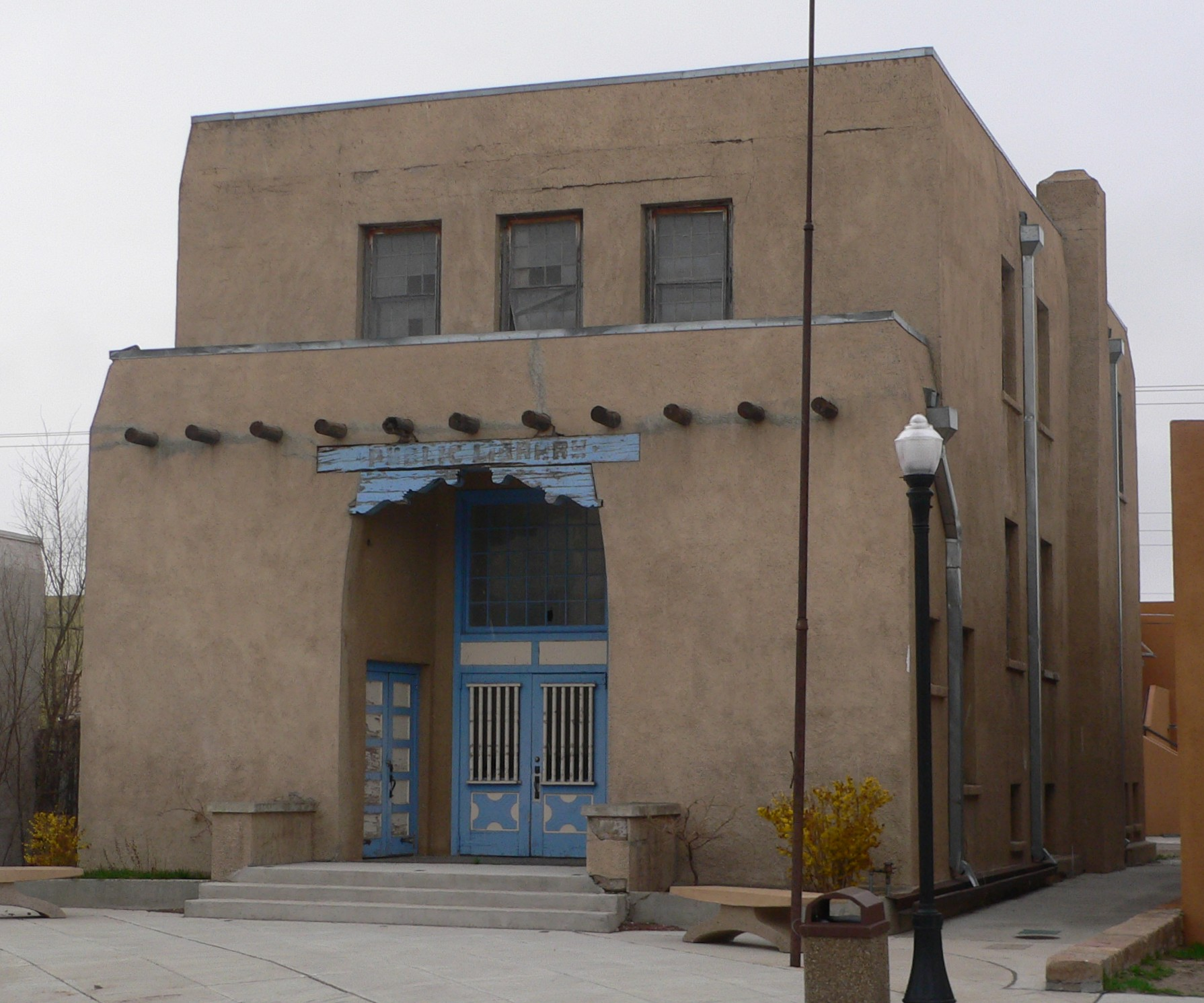
- D. D. Monroe Civic Building in 2015

- Location within New Mexico
- Location: 116 Walnut St., Clayton, New Mexico
- Coordinates: 36°27′3″N 103°10′56″W
- Area: less than one acre
- Built: 1939
- Architect: Willard C. Kruger, et al.
- Architectural style: Pueblo Revival
- MPS: New Deal in New Mexico MPS
- NRHP reference No.: 02001550
- NMSRCP No.: 1814

Significant dates
- Added to NRHP: December 20, 2002
- Designated NMSRCP: April 5, 2002

The Clayton Public Library, at 116 Walnut St. in Clayton, New Mexico, was built in 1939 as a New Deal construction work. It was designed by Willard C. Kruger in Pueblo Revival architecture. It is now known as the D.D. Monroe Civic Building. It has served historically as a library, as a meeting hall, and as a clubhouse.

It was listed as one of the top 10 most endangered historic buildings in New Mexico in 2002.

It was listed on the National Register of Historic Places in 2002.

The Albert W. Thompson Memorial Library at 17 Chestnut Street currently serves as Clayton's public library. It holds about 18,000 volumes and circulates about 12,000 annually.

== See also ==
- National Register of Historic Places listings in Union County, New Mexico
