= Odis Echols =

American politician

Odis Leonard Echols, Jr. (May 28, 1930 – March 28, 2013) was an American politician, lobbyist, and radio broadcaster.

Born in Clovis, New Mexico, Echols graduated from Texas Tech University, Echols and his father, Odis "Pops" Echols, were radio broadcasters. Echols served in the New Mexico State Senate 1966–77. He died in Albuquerque, New Mexico.
