= E. S. Jennison =

American architect

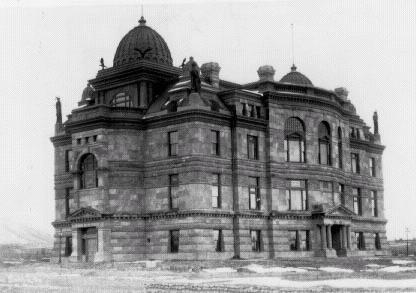
New Mexico Territorial Capitol Building, Santa Fe, NM. 1886. Burned 1892.

Edwin Shannon Jennison (1832-1895), better known as E. S. Jennison, was an American architect from Chicago, Illinois.

Jennison was born in 1832 in Walpole, New Hampshire. He later relocated to Michigan, where he attended the University of Michigan, class of 1868. He immediately opened an architect's office in Chicago. He remained active in his profession until his death in 1895.

He is most notable for his design of New Mexico's first Capitol Building.

== Works ==
- Singer Building, State & Washington Sts., Chicago, IL (1868) - Burned 1871 (Great Chicago Fire).
- Hale Building, 31 N. State St., Chicago, IL (1870) - Burned 1871.
- University Hall, University of Michigan, Ann Arbor, MI (1871) - Demolished 1950.
- Hale Building, 31 N. State St., Chicago, IL (1872) - Demolished 1890s.
- Singer Building, State & Washington Sts., Chicago, IL (1873) - Burned 1877.
- Kalamazoo High School, Kalamazoo, MI (1881) - Burned 1897.
- New Mexico Territorial Capitol Building, Santa Fe, NM (1886) - Burned 1892.
- Building, 382-384 Clark St., Chicago, IL (1892) - Demolished.
