= New Mexico State Capitol =

State capitol building of the U.S. state of New Mexico

Coordinates: 35.6823°N 105.9397°W

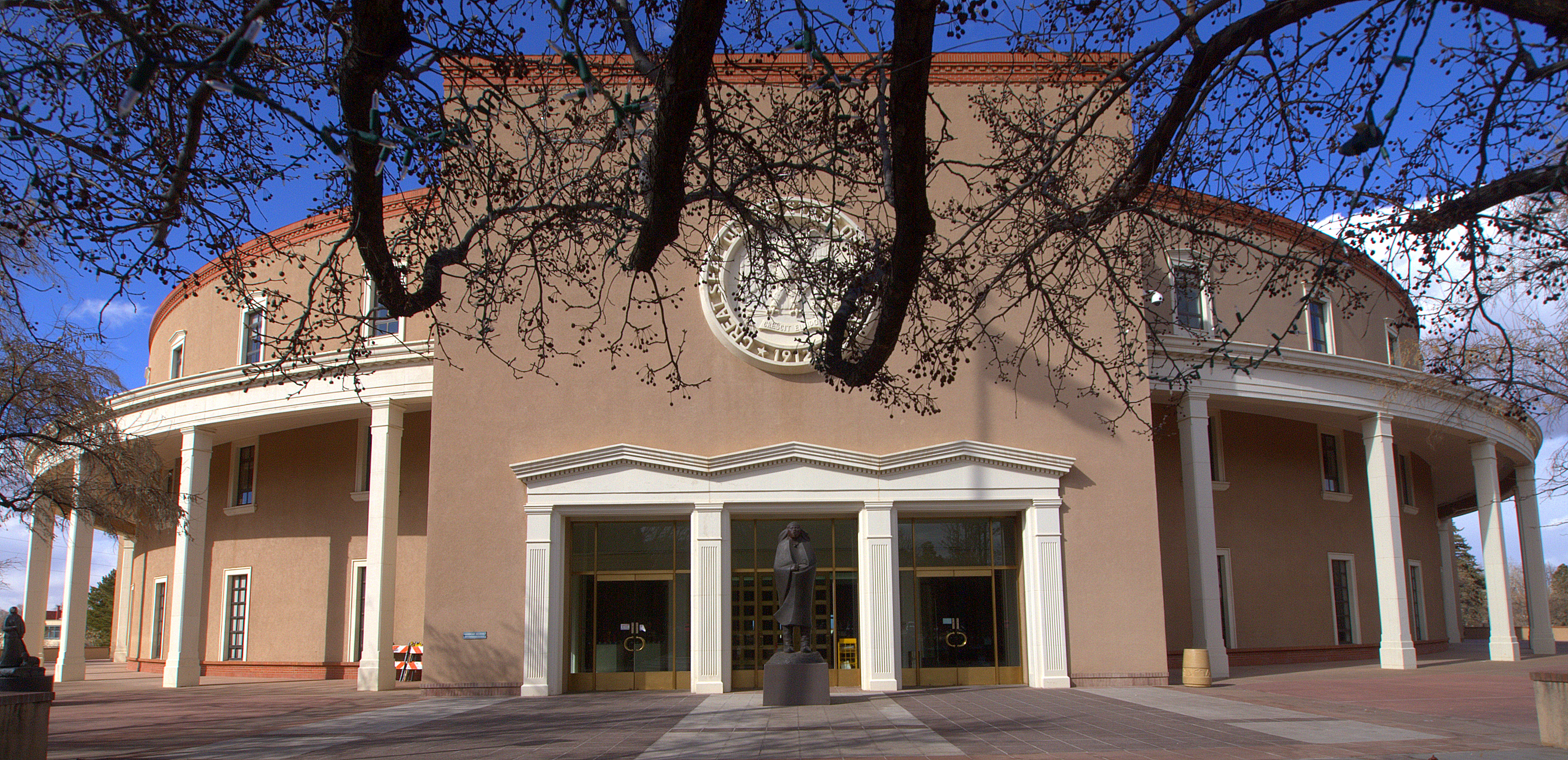
- Interactive map of the New Mexico State Capitol area

General information
- Architectural style: New Mexico territorial style, Greek Revival, Pueblo Revival
- Location: 490 Old Santa Fe Trail, Santa Fe, New Mexico 87501
- Inaugurated: December 8, 1966; 59 years ago
- Cost: $4,676,860

Design and construction
- Architect: W.C. Kruger

The New Mexico State Capitol is the seat of government of the U.S. state of New Mexico, located in its capital city of Santa Fe. It houses both chambers of the New Mexico Legislature and the offices of the Governor, Lieutenant Governor, and Secretary of State. The building is one of only eleven state capitols without a dome, and the only circular state capitol in the United States, for which it is commonly known as "the Roundhouse".

New Mexico has had four territorial and state capitols, including the oldest in the U.S., the Palace of the Governors, which was built in 1610. The current capitol building, constructed between 1964 and 1966, is the newest of any U.S. state after Hawaii and Florida. Designed by local architect W.C. Kruger, the New Mexico State Capitol features the state's distinctive New Mexico territorial style, which blends the neoclassical elements of most state capitols with regional indigenous, Spanish, and Mexican influences.

Located in central Santa Fe, the New Mexico State Capitol is part of the Capitol Complex that includes the main offices of other executive agencies and the seat of the New Mexico Supreme Court and New Mexico Court of Appeals. The state capitol is situated in landscaped campus that includes monuments, memorials, and a public art collection throughout its grounds.

== Design and construction ==
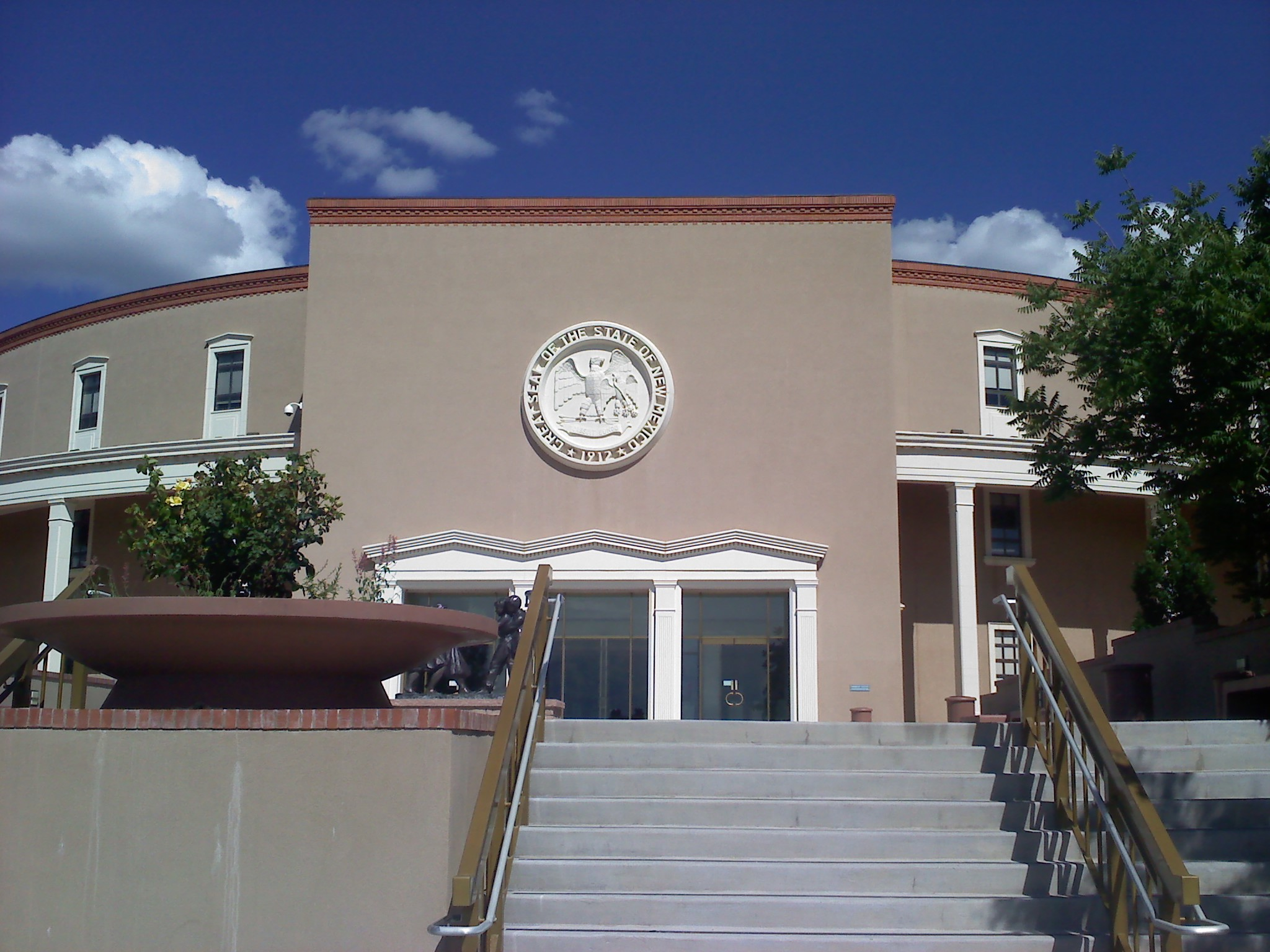
The eastern entrance of the capitol building.

The New Mexico State Capitol was designed to resemble the Zia sun symbol when viewed from above, with four entrance wings that protrude from the main cylindrical volume.

Architecturally, the Capitol is a blend of New Mexico Territorial Revival style and neoclassical influences. Above each entrance is a stone carving of the State Seal of New Mexico. The building has four levels, one of which is below ground.

Dedicated on December 8, 1966, the building was designed by W.C. Kruger and constructed by Robert E. McKee. Its extensive marblework was installed by the New Mexico Marble and Tile Company. The capitol contains 232,346 square feet (22,000 m^{2}) and was built for the cost of $4,676,860, or $20 per square foot ($215/m^{2}).

The capitol houses the New Mexico Legislature. The first floor (below ground) contains the semicircular House and Senate chambers, which are not accessible to the public. The second story, which is the ground floor, includes galleries where visitors can view the House and Senate chambers. The House gallery seats 281 people and is located on the south side of the building. The Senate gallery, which seats 206 people, is on the north side of the building. The two upper floors are mainly offices, with legislative committee offices on the third floor and the offices of the Governor, Lieutenant Governor, and Legislative Council Service on the fourth floor.

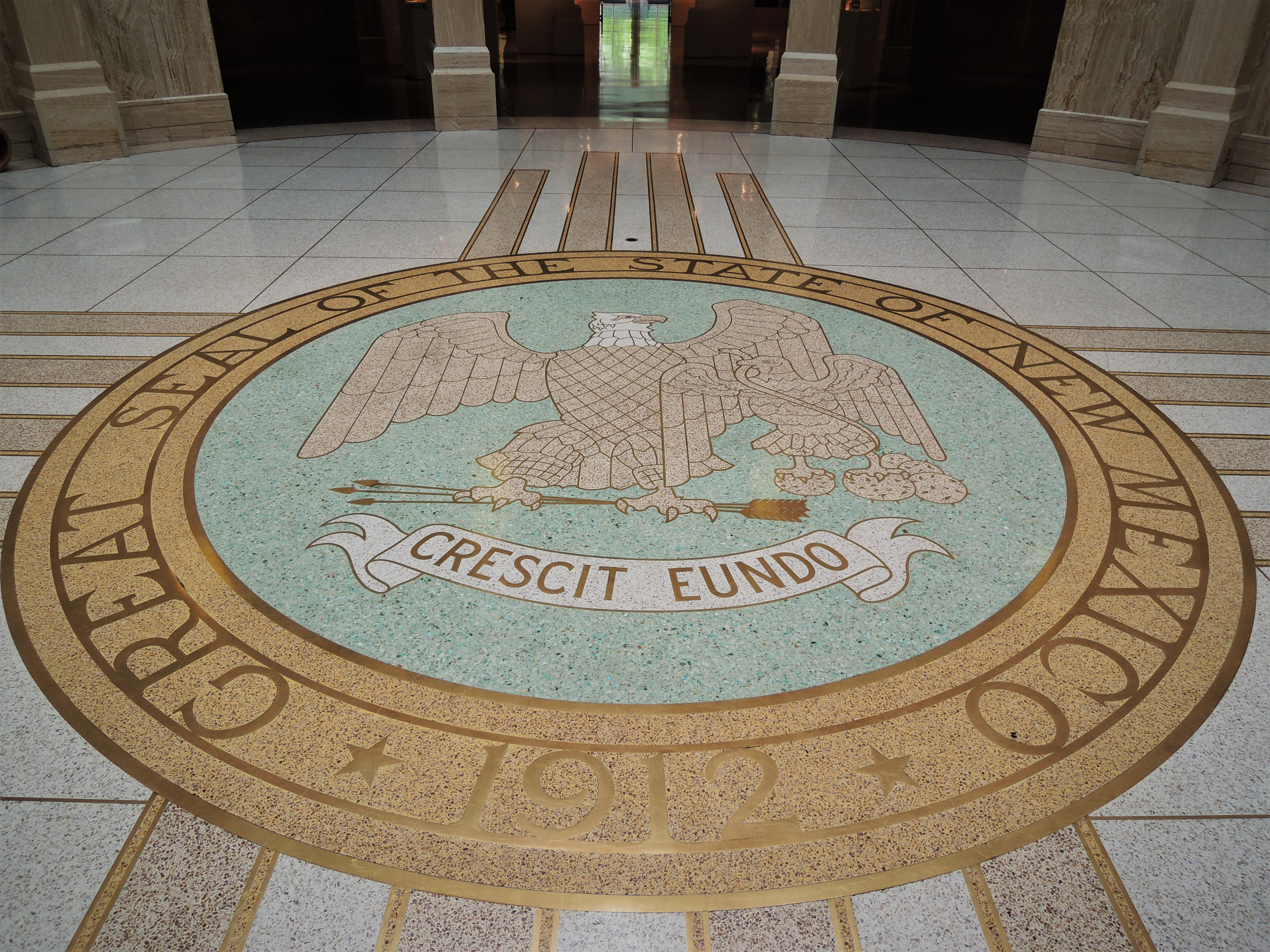
Great Seal - floor of Capitol Rotunda

The Rotunda in the center of the building is 49 feet (15 m) in diameter and 60 feet (18 m) high, spanning the second, third, and fourth floors. The Rotunda is finished with Travertine marble native to New Mexico and inlaid with a turquoise and brass mosaic of the Great Seal of New Mexico. The ceiling skylight is designed to resemble an Indian basket weave, with blue and pale pink stained glass representing the sky and the earth, respectively. The flags of New Mexico's 33 counties are on permanent display on the fourth-floor balcony.

Surrounding the capitol is a lush 6.5-acre (2.6 ha) garden boasting more than 100 varieties of plants, including roses, plums, almonds, nectarines, Russian olive trees, and sequoias. Statues of native Pueblo peoples carrying pottery and hunting dot the property.

A renovation in 1992 included expansion of the committee rooms, asbestos abatement, mechanical and electrical improvements and greater accessibility for handicapped people. The building was rededicated on December 4, 1992.

== Artwork ==
=== Capitol Art Foundation ===
The Legislature created the Capitol Art Foundation in 1991, which has since become one of the building's most endearing features. The Foundation was created to assist in the acquisition of art for permanent, public exhibition in the State Capitol. The Collection features contemporary masterworks by artists who live and work in New Mexico. The Capitol Art collection is housed throughout the public areas of the building on all four floors. The Collection consists of a wide range of media, styles and traditions, including handcrafted furniture groupings. The mission of the Capitol Art Foundation is to collect, preserve, exhibit, interpret and promote appreciation of works of art that represent the history, cultures and art forms of the people of New Mexico.

=== Governor's Gallery ===
The Governor's Gallery is located on the fourth floor of the New Mexico State Capitol. The gallery was founded and opened in April 1975 by First Lady of New Mexico Clara Apodaca as a space to educate the public about the artistic heritage of the state. The first exhibition featured paintings by Georgia O'Keeffe, who attended the gallery's opening. It rotates exhibitions several times a year, with the annual Governor's Awards for Excellence in the Arts exhibition held every fall.

== History ==
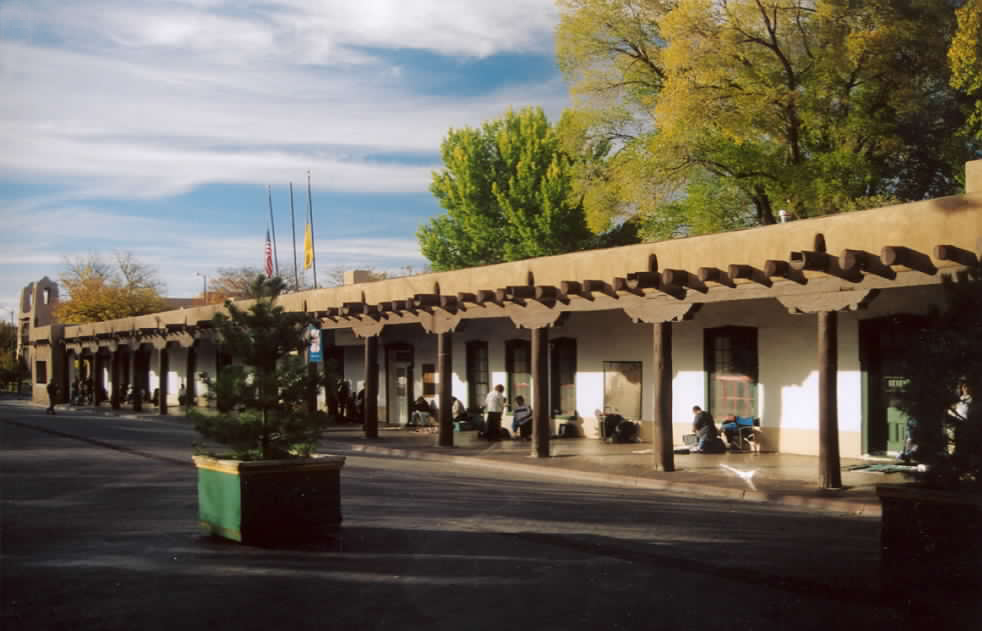
The Palace of the Governors

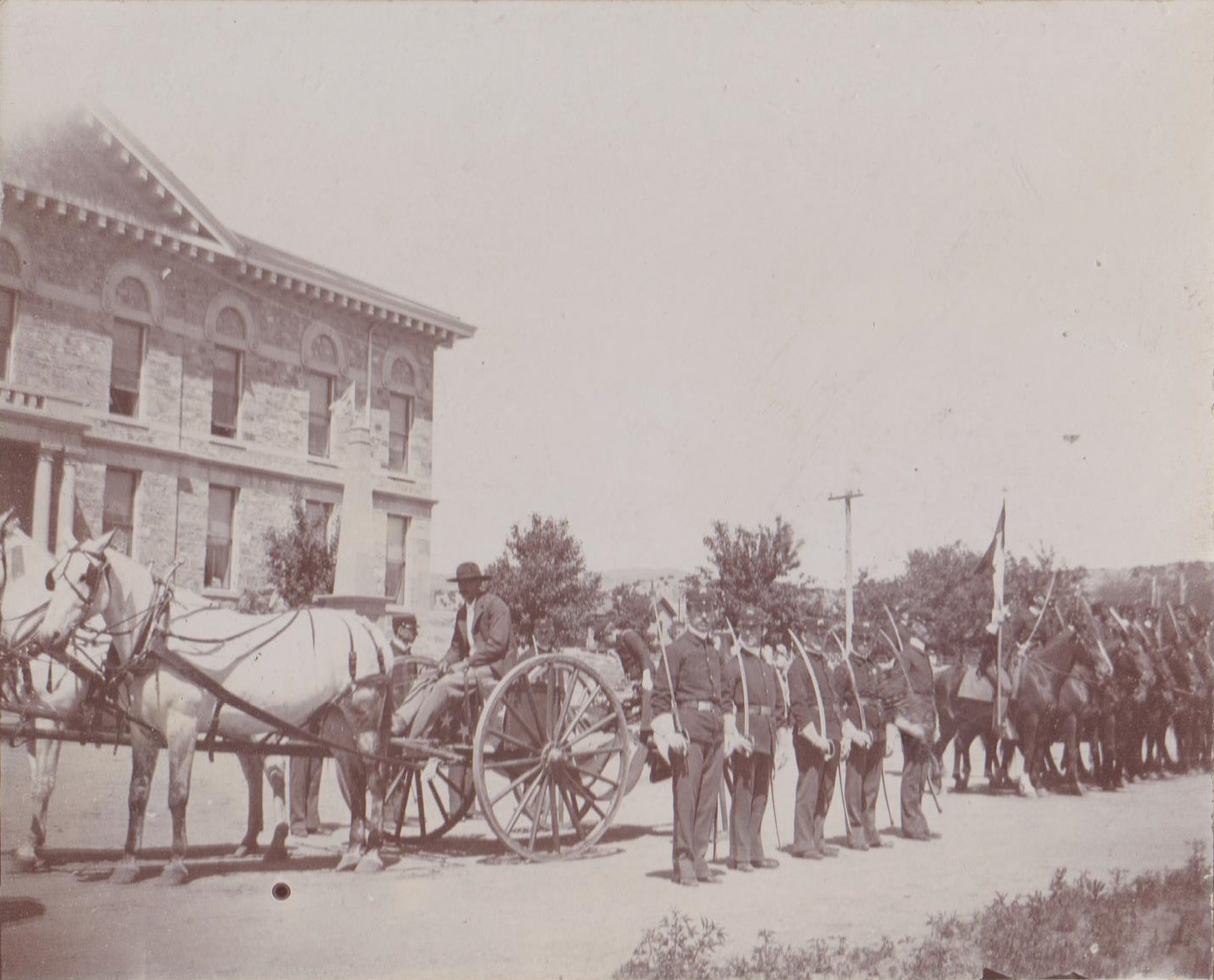
U.S. Cavalry at the Santa Fe Territorial Capitol dedication ceremony on June 4, 1900. The 1850 Territorial Courthouse building is at left.

The Roundhouse is the fourth capitol building of New Mexico. Built in 1966, it is the third newest capitol in the U.S. (after those of Hawaii and Florida, completed in 1969 and 1978, respectively). New Mexico also has the oldest capitol building in the country, the Palace of the Governors.

=== Palace of the Governors ===
Built in 1610 by the Spanish, the Palace of the Governors is located on the Santa Fe Plaza. It was the house of government in Santa Fe for nearly three centuries, during periods of Spanish and Mexican rule. When New Mexico was annexed by the United States in 1846, it became the first territorial capitol and was used as such for forty years. Now a museum, the Palace is the only capitol in the U.S. that has housed the governments of three different nations.

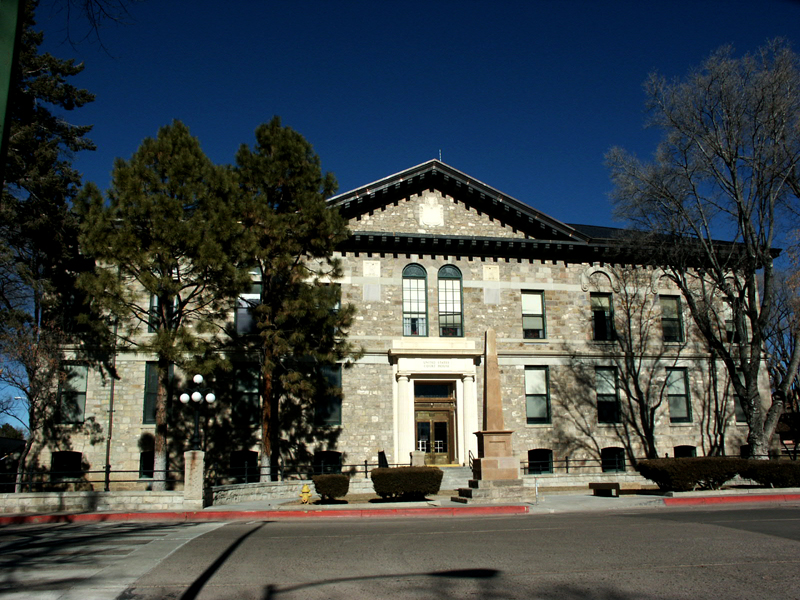
Federal Courthouse

=== 1850 Capitol (federal courthouse) ===
In anticipation of New Mexico's statehood, work began on a new capitol building in 1850. However, funding for its construction was quickly exhausted, and in 1855 work on the project was halted with only the first story of the building completed. It remained in this state until 1886, when the second story and roof were finally finished. However, by this time a new territorial capitol was already being constructed, so the old building was never officially used as the capitol. (It did temporarily house the territorial government between 1892 and 1900.) Instead, it became the Territorial (later Federal) Courthouse. This building still stands in its original form.

=== 1886 Capitol ===
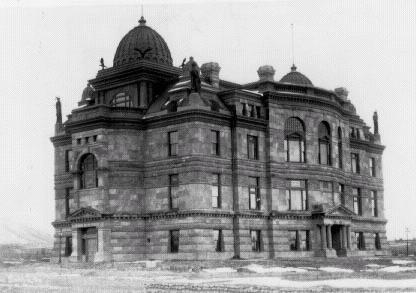
1886 Capitol Building

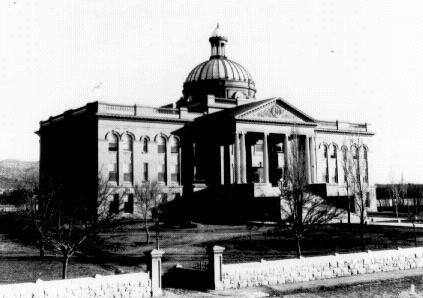
1900 Capitol Building

In 1886, a new building replaced the antiquated Palace of the Governors as the territorial capitol. Four stories high, the monumental building was constructed from sandstone quarried in Lamy and topped by colossal bronze statues representing Liberty, Justice, Commerce and Industry. It was designed by Chicago architect E. S. Jennison. Six years after its opening, on the evening of May 12, 1892, a fire began and destroyed the structure, though bystanders were able to save most of the archives, books, and furniture. The building was uninsured and its loss cost the territory over $200,000.

An investigation concluded the fire was set deliberately, as it reportedly broke out in two separate areas simultaneously and a crucial emergency hose seemed to have been sabotaged. The identity and motive of the perpetrator were never determined.

=== 1900 Capitol (Bataan Memorial Building) ===
The next capitol building, designed by Isaac Rapp, was not completed until 1900. In the meantime, the government was housed in the Territorial Court House, and the adjoining judicial offices. After the costly loss of the previous building, the new capitol was completed on a shoestring budget of less than $140,000, using salvaged materials and unpaid convict labor from the Penitentiary of New Mexico to save money. The building was three stories high with a silver dome, cupola, and neoclassical portico. The first story was constructed from sandstone reused from the old capitol, while the second and third floors were yellow brick and the portico was Indiana limestone. It was dedicated on June 4, 1900.

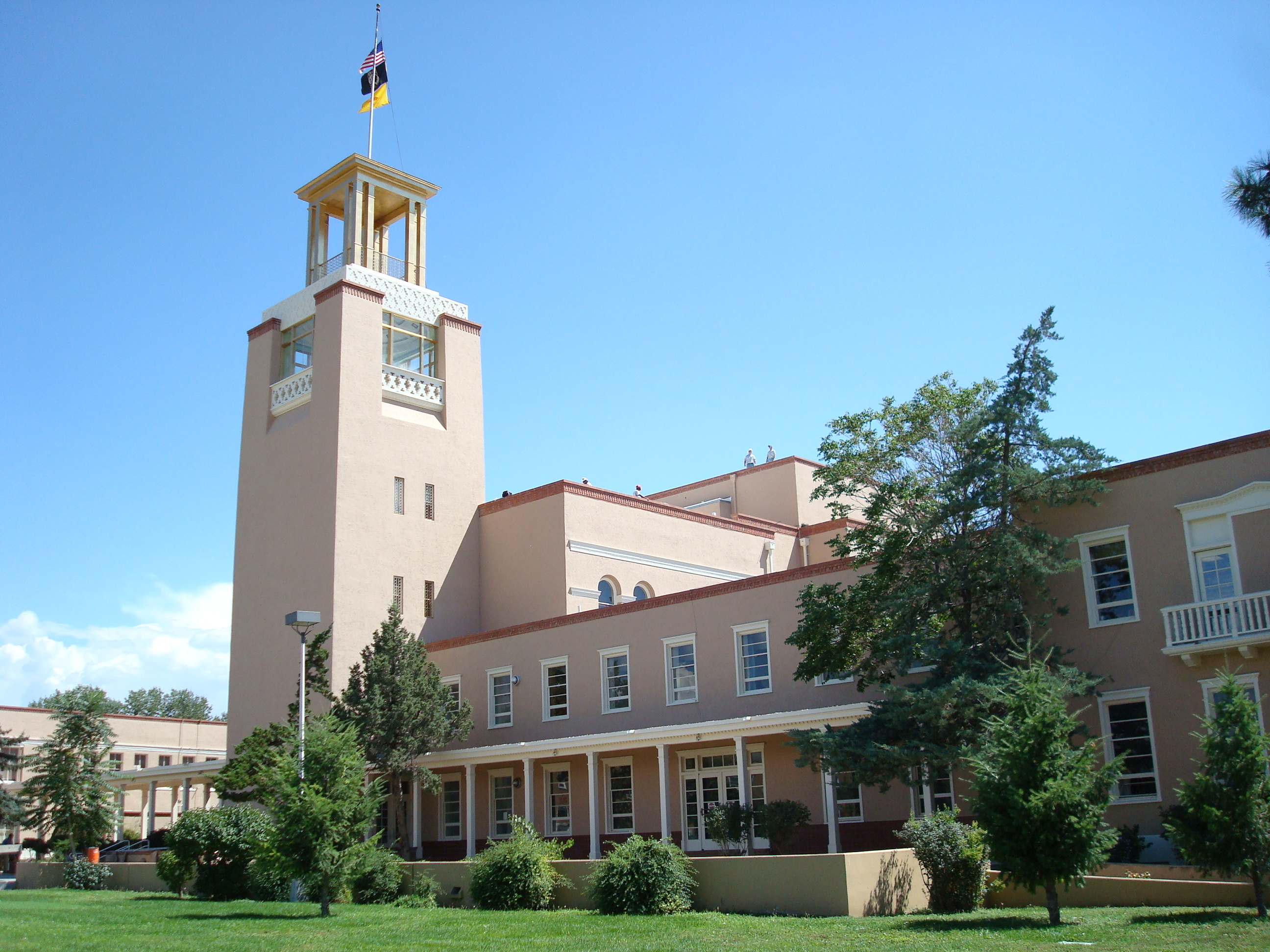
The modern Bataan Memorial Building with the Territorial Revival design.

During the next several decades, various additions were built adjacent to the capitol building. In 1950 a major project was begun to unify the architectural appearance of all the buildings in the government complex to the Territorial Revival style. The dome, which had often been criticized as not appropriate for the state, was removed and a 105-foot (32 m) tower was added at the north end of the building. The building is now known as the Bataan Memorial Building, to commemorate the Bataan Death March. It houses numerous offices of the State Government. The old capitol is almost entirely obscured by the later additions, or in the case of the pedimented portico, removals, but its third story arched windows are still recognizable.

== Gallery ==
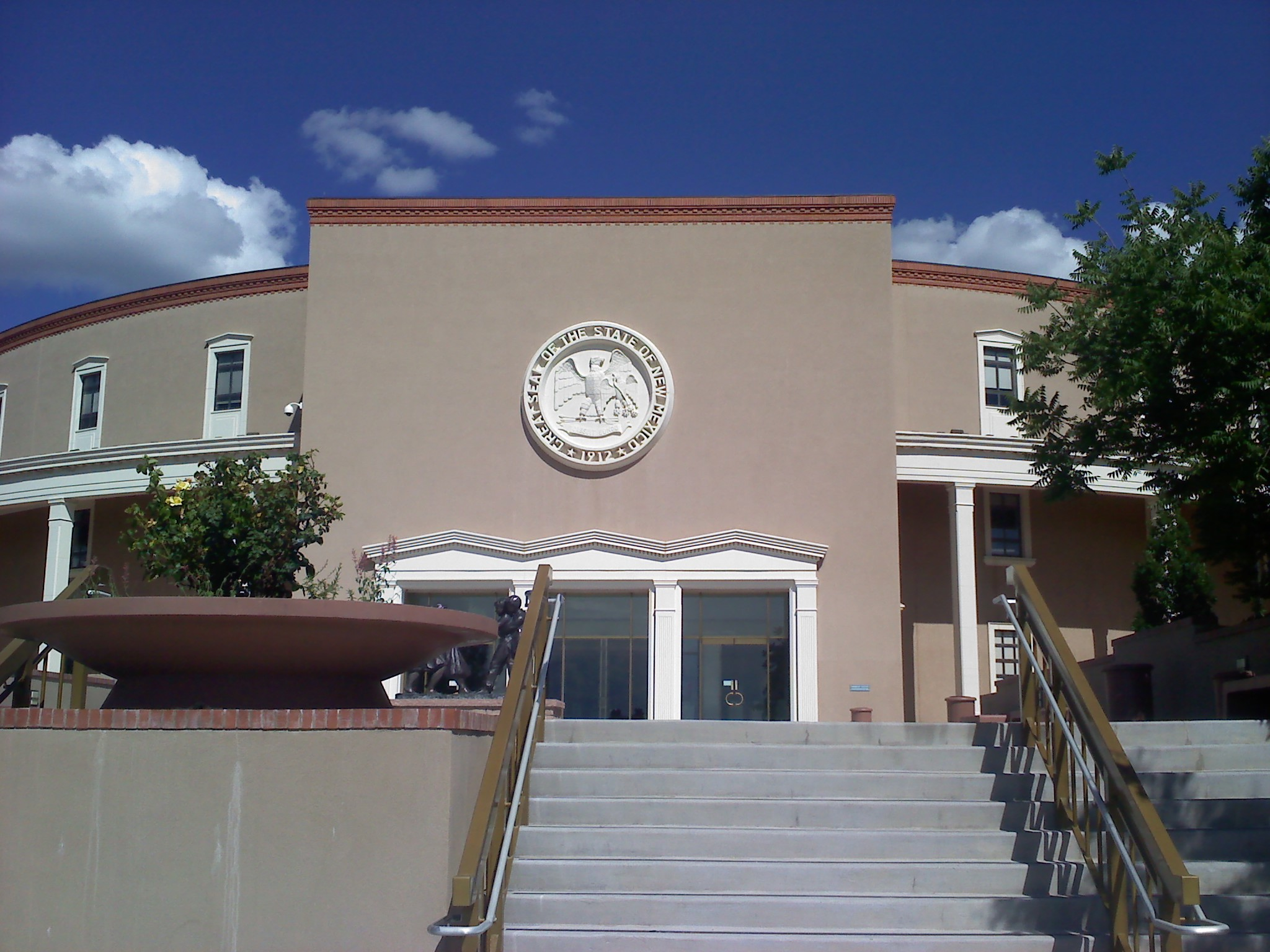
East entrance

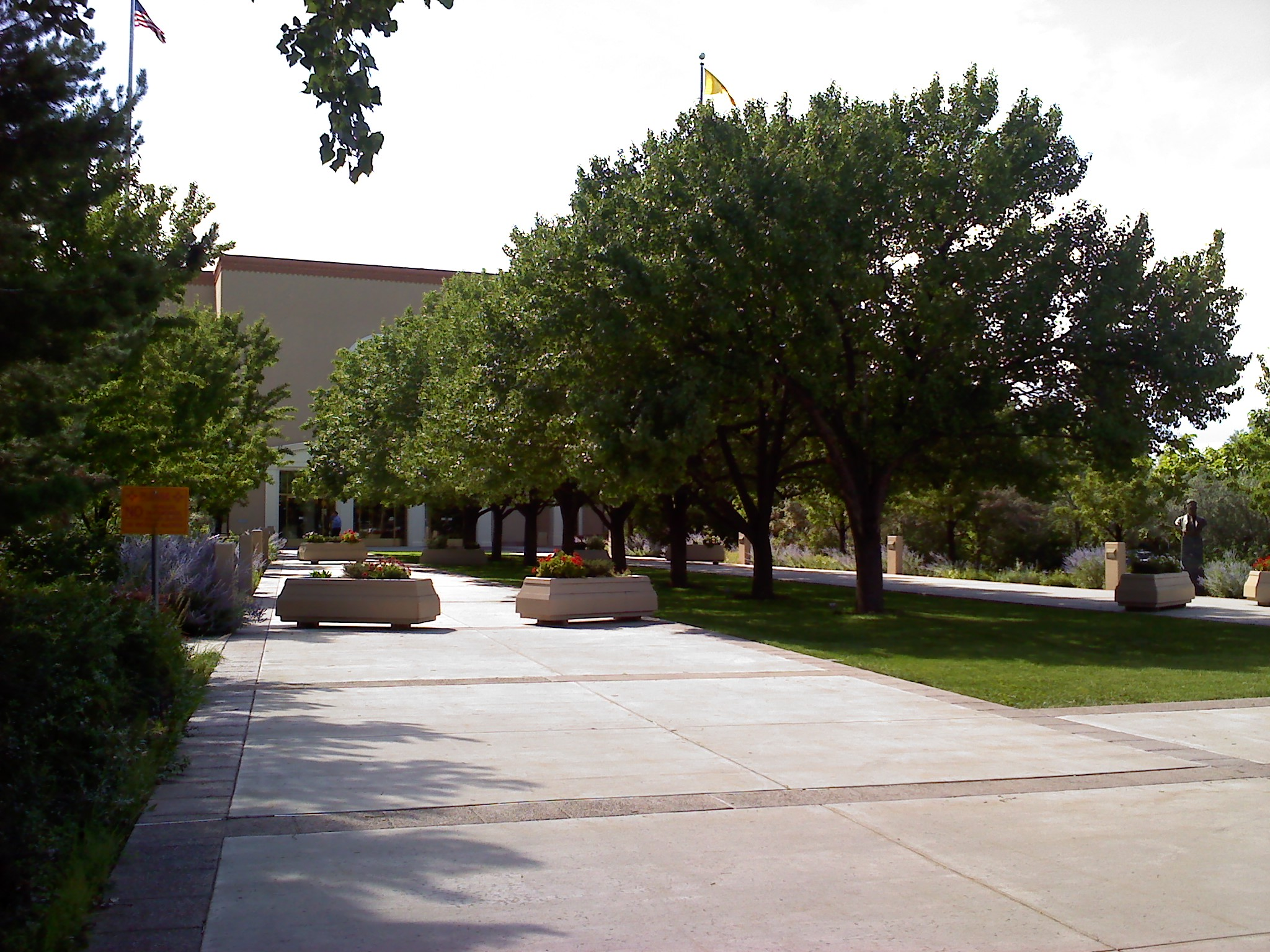
West entrance

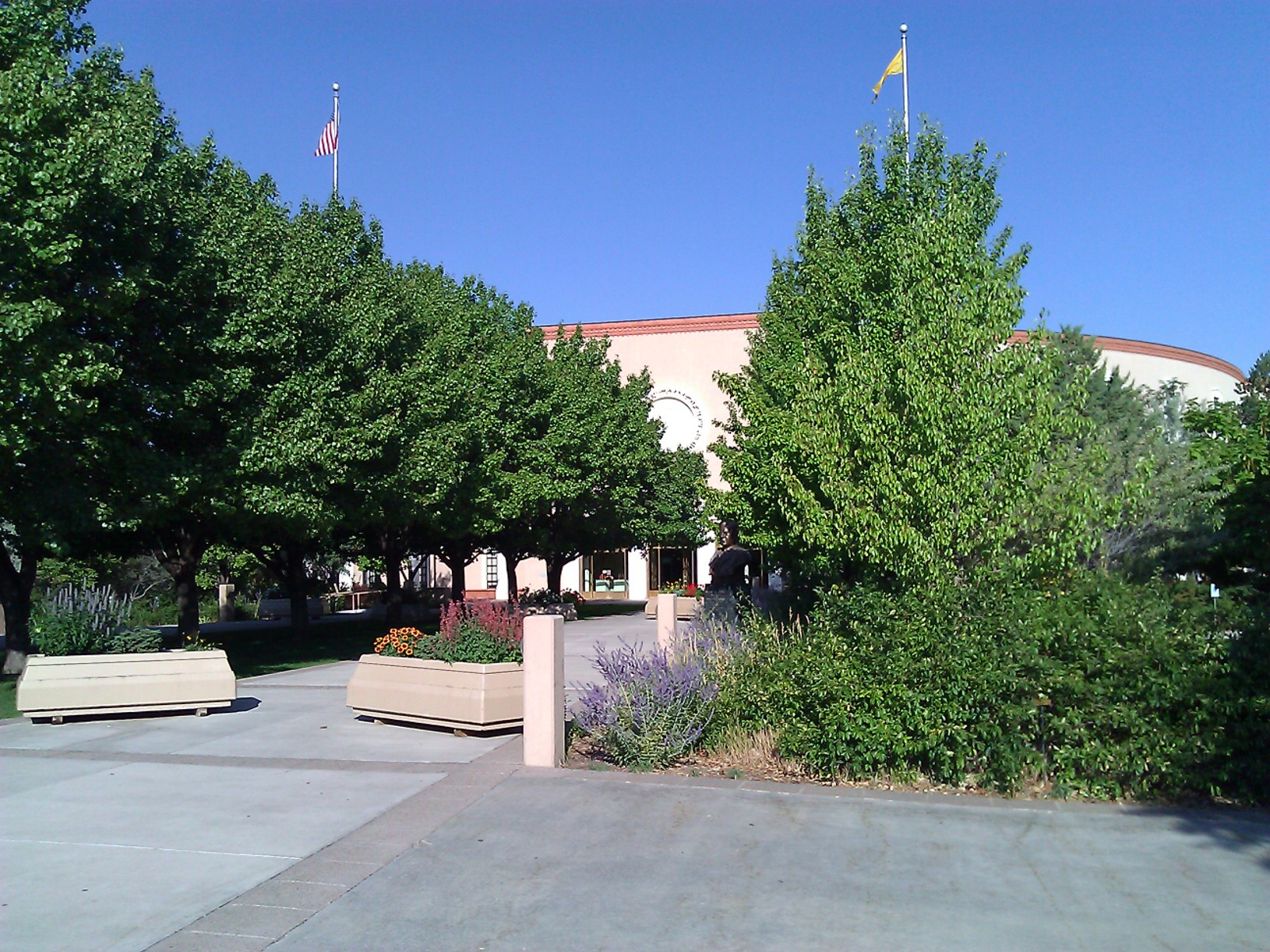
Capitol Gardens

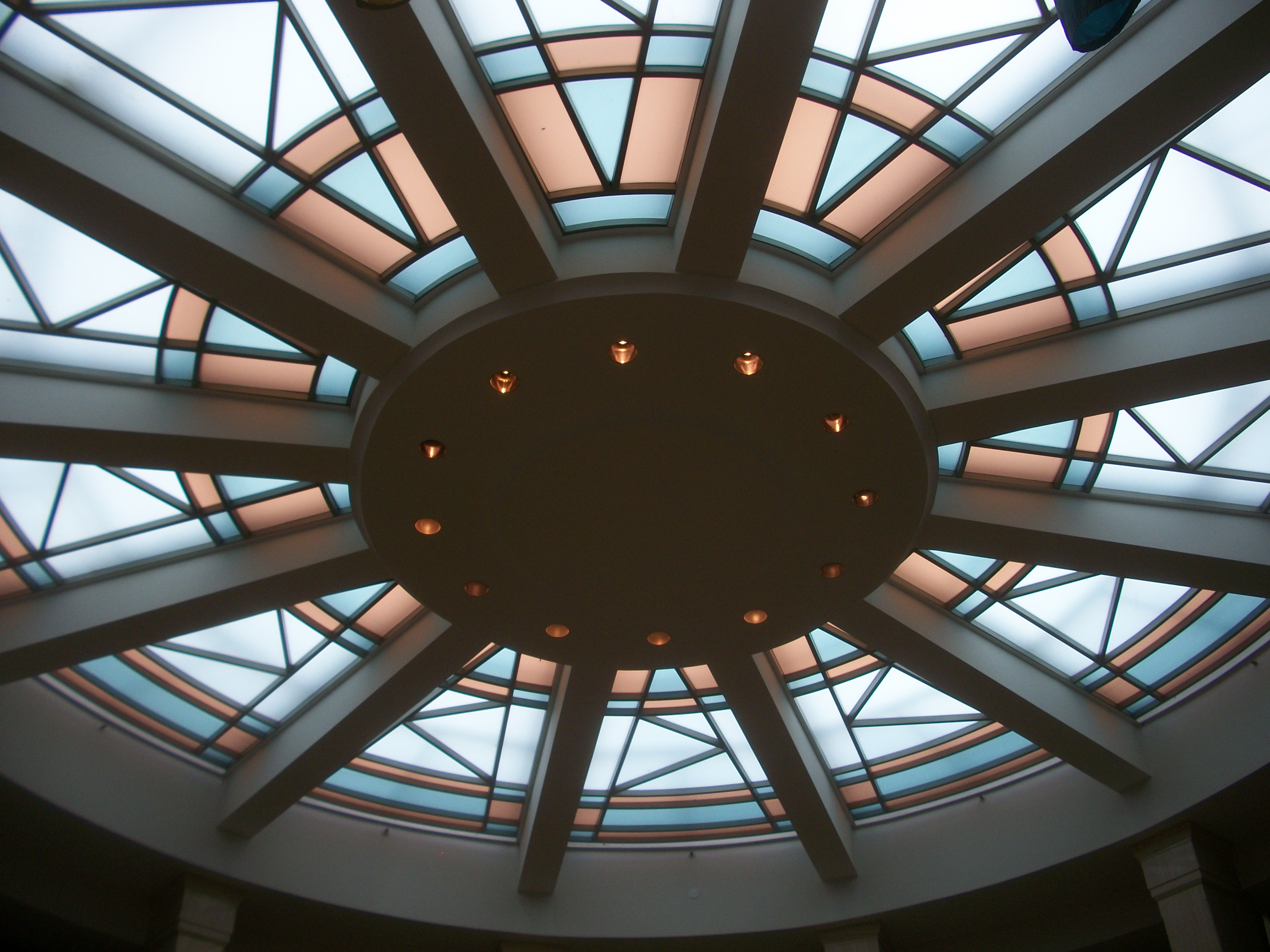
Capitol rotunda

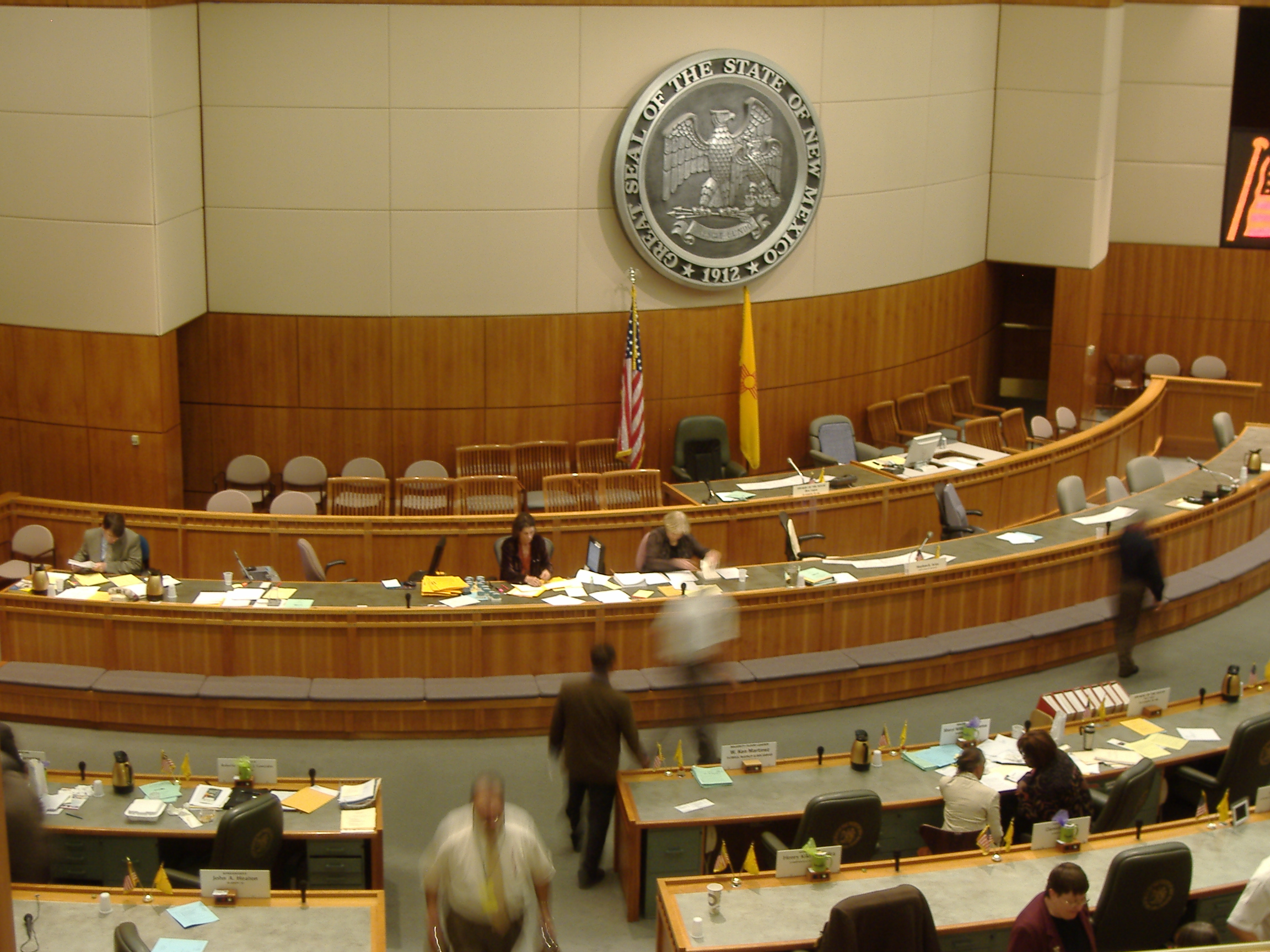
Interior of the Senate Chamber

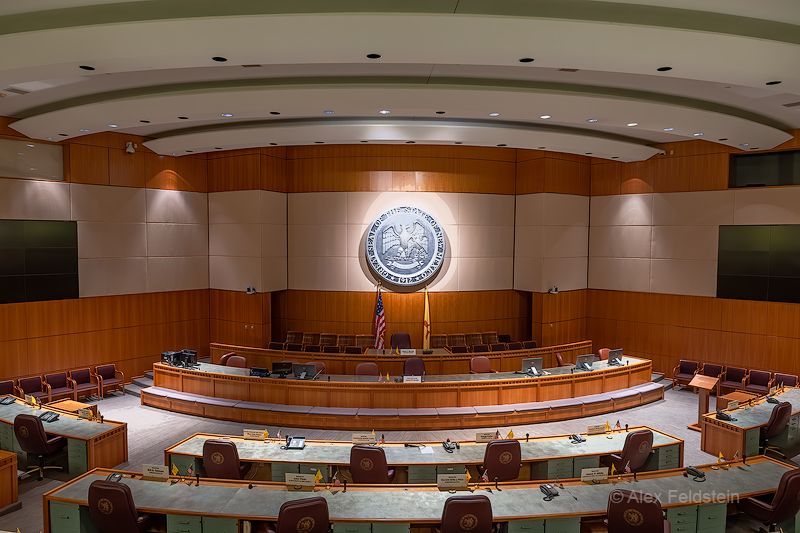
New Mexico Senate chambers

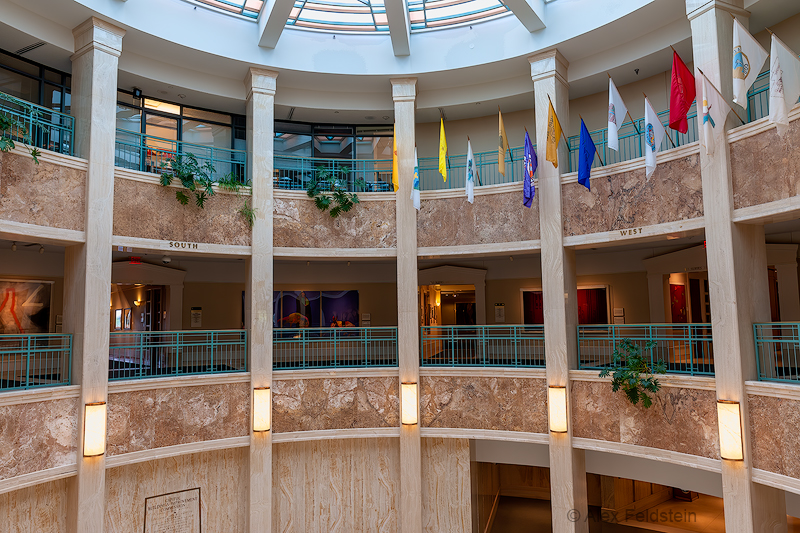
New Mexico Capitol Rotunda

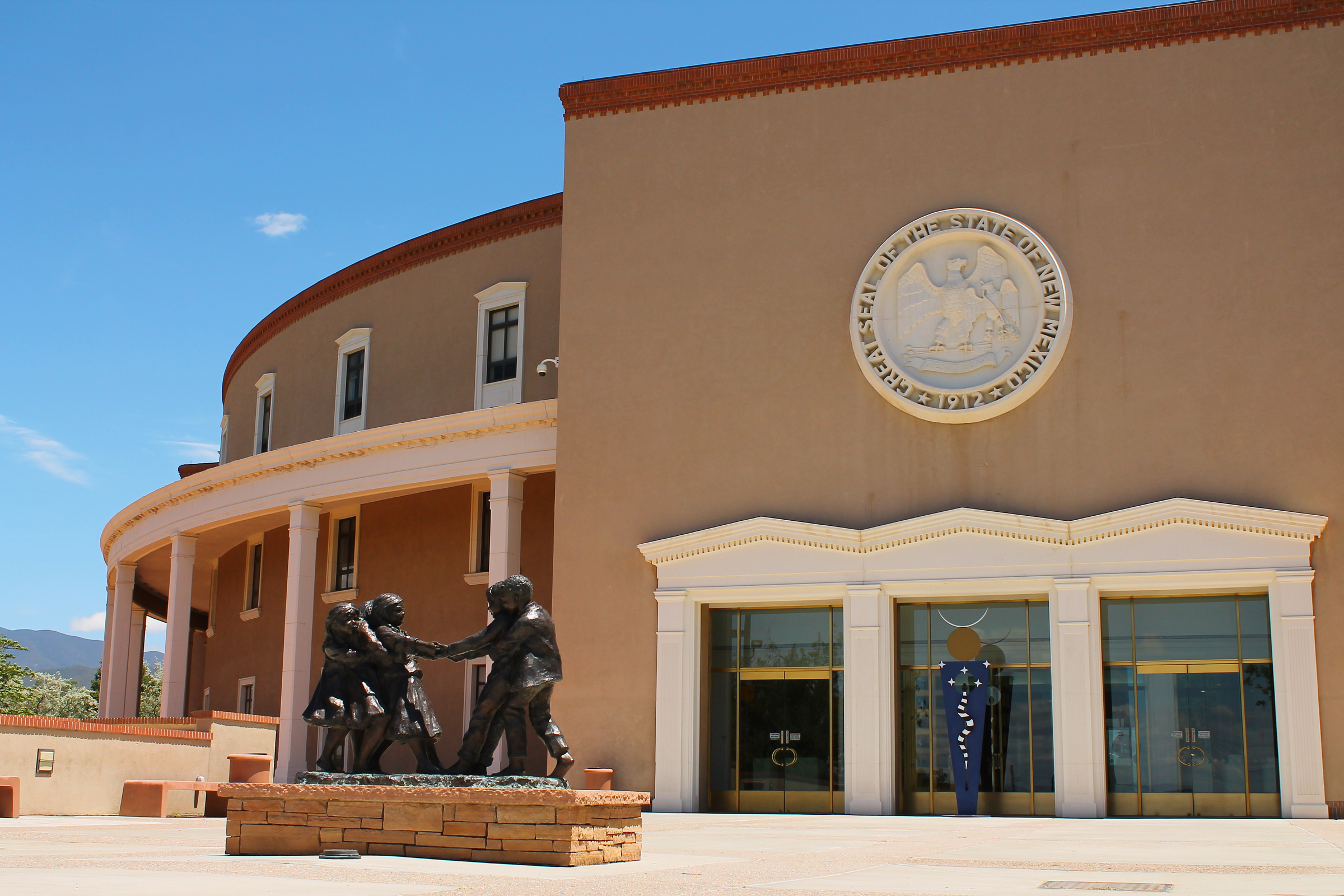
Alternate view of the east entrance

== See also ==
- List of New Mexico state legislatures
- List of state and territorial capitols in the United States
