= Satti (surname) =

Satti is a surname that may refer to people from the Satti tribe or other people, which include:

- C. John Satti (1895–1968), American politician
- Dorothy Satti (1901–1960), American politician
- Ghulam Murtaza Satti, Pakistani politician
- Marina Satti (born 1986), Greek singer, songwriter and music producer
- Roberto Satti (born 1945), Italian singer, musician and film actor
- Satinder Satti, Indian television host
- Satpal Singh Satti, Indian politician
- Tauseef Satti (born 1980), New Zealand-based cricketer
- Mohamed Hamad Satti, Sudanese physician (1914–2005)
