= Bates Woods =

Woodland trails park in Connecticut, US

- Interactive map of Bates Woods
- Type: Urban park
- Location: New London, CT
- Coordinates: 41.354°N 72.121°W
- Area: 85 acres (340,000 m^{2})
- Established: 1912

Bates Woods is approximately 85 acres of historic woodland trails around wetlands and ancient rock ledges in northwest New London, Connecticut. The park accounts for nearly half of the city's 221 acres of public open space, or about 6 percent of New London's total land area.

A BioBlitz surveying event in 2003 identified 1,691 species in Bates Woods in less than 24 hours, including the goldcap moss-eater moth (Epimartyria auricrinella), which has been called a living fossil. Stone walls and other park features date to the Works Progress Administration and earlier centuries.

Connecticut State Archaeologist Nicholas F. Bellantoni has noted the possibility that evidence of American Indian life could be uncovered in Bates Woods, particularly where stone outcroppings would have provided shelter for migrating tribes.

== History ==
=== Pre-twentieth century ===
The natural history of Bates Woods goes back millennia before it was known as Bates Woods. For centuries after the founding of New London in 1646, the area known today as Bates Woods was called Cedar Swamp. The Cedar Swamp is mentioned in the "Incorporation of the City of New London" in its municipal code; the land of John Ashcraft is mentioned, too, after whom Ashcraft Road is named, which feeds into the main eastern entrance of the park today. In the 18th century, Joshua Hempstead, in his Diary of Joshua Hempstead of New London, Connecticut, Covering a Period of Forty-seven Years, from September 1711, to November, 1758, makes many mentions of his work in the old Cedar Swamp.

In the 19th century, Frances Manwaring Caulkins, the most well-known historian of the city, makes 9 mentions of the Cedar Swamp in her History of New London, Connecticut: From the First Survey of the Coast in 1612 to 1860. Of swamps in New London, Caulkins says they "have enjoyed the reputation of being haunted — not generally, however, by ghosts of the dead, but by living bugbears — such as old Indians, deserters from English ships, witches, and trampers."

=== Twentieth century ===
Fast forward to the twentieth century and Bates Woods was purchased by park commissioner George S. Palmer on April 2, 1912 at a cost of $8,000 “for [the] purposes of a public park.” A year earlier, the local newspaper reported that “20 men [were] at work to quarry and cut the stone in what is called Bates Woods” for the spire at St. Mary’s Star of the Sea church on Huntington street in downtown New London.

The purchase of 100 acres in Bates Woods for a “picturesque public park” signaled a watershed year for New London, as the city bought hundreds of acres of land for a comprehensive park system that was being designed by landscape architect John Nolen.

During its first decade as a park, however, concern began to grow that Bates Woods was not being properly managed. High school students called for improving the park, and The Tattler section of The Day newspaper expressed a desire for a “bigger and broader policy in the matter of maintaining city parks.”

In 1934 plans were announced to create an ice skating pond. This would involve creating a dam and clearing away the trees and stumps.

Just 3 years later in July 1937, 50 WPA workers were contracted to create the skating pond, as well as a bridge and dam. The pond was created to accommodate hundreds of skaters, as well as being shallow to increase safety. It would even include an area for hockey matches, the skating pond was set to open that winter.

In 1979, the Eastern Connecticut Resource Conservation & Development Area Environmental Review Team provided a report calling for the closure of the landfill in Bates Woods, claiming it would be the perfect area for recreation fields (such as tennis and baseball fields), citing stone-free land with excellent drainage. The only limitation was that the dump would need to be closed in accordance with State Solid Waste Management regulations.

In 1982, Public Works Director Andrew H. Sims outlined a plan, using $224,000 in federal cash, to close the 20-year-old city landfill and construct a playground and recreational fields. This would provide much-needed recreation for the nearly 2000 children living in the city’s north end.

In December 1988, following intense public pressure, the city council voted to permanently close the landfill. However, illegal dumping by the public works department continued, as did other infractions, such as the dumping of debris into Truman Brook during the construction of the recreation fields the following year.

In 2025, the City finalized a plan for a solar array project in the Park. A driveway has been constructed to provide access to the former landfill for the array's construction. The array will consist of 3,000 panels and was approved by the City’s Planning and Zoning Commission earlier in 2025.

The community group Bates Friends Forever advocates for the protection of the Park. The group is volunteer-driven, regularly organizing clean-ups and engaging New Londoners.

== Environment ==
=== Geology and Soils ===
The park's subsurface consists of glacial till and metamorphic bedrock outcrops, typical of southeastern Connecticut. The Environmental Review Team Report(1979) identified several areas of shallow soils over bedrock and low-lying depressions containing poorly drained wetland soils. The report also noted remnants of past human disturbance, including localized landfill deposits and erosion from informal trails, that have since been partially revegetated by secondary forest growth.
