= William Adams (Dedham) =

William Adams (May 27, 1650 – August 17, 1685) was minister of the First Church and Parish in Dedham.

== Early life ==
He was born in Ipswich, Massachusetts on May 27, 1650, and graduated from Harvard College in 1671. His parents, William Adams Jr., and his wife, whose maiden name was likely Star, both died by the time Adams was nine years old. After that, he was raised by two uncles. He began a diary by writing that he was "born a sinner into an evil world," a notion that demonstrated a Calvanistic religious philosophy as well as a suspicion that God was punishing him. After being denied entrance into Harvard in August 1667, he returned a month later with his uncle and was accepted. He was graduated in August 1671.

== Ministry ==
Two weeks after graduating from Harvard, John Allin, the minister in Dedham, died. Adams was asked to preach on several occasions following Allin's death, having been somewhat acquainted with the community beforehand.

After three calls, he finally accepted to be ordained as minister in Dedham on December 3, 1673. As there was no official parsonage, he rented the house of his predecessor. Two of his sermons survive, including one given before the Great and General Court and another given in Dedham on November 21, 1678. His tenure in Dedham was mostly calm, save for some complaints about seating arrangements in the meetinghouse and delays in paying his salary.

He died August 17, 1685. Prayers at funerals were not customary in that day but one was offered at his, one of the first ever recorded in New England. He is buried in the Old Village Cemetery in the tomb of Timothy Dwight.

== Family ==
On October 21, 1674, Adams married Mary Manning of Cambridge. They had three children, Mary, Eliphalet, and William. Mary died on June 24, 1679. On March 29, 1680, he married Alice Bradford of Plymouth. They had four more children: Elizabeth, Alice, William, and Abiel, who was born after Adams' death. The first son named William died before his first birthday, as did daughter Mary. Eliphalet Adams served as a minister in New London, Connecticut.

== Works cited ==
- Smith, Frank (1936). A History of Dedham, Massachusetts. Transcript Press, Incorporated.
- Worthington, Erastus (1827). The history of Dedham: from the beginning of its settlement, in September 1635, to May 1827. Dutton and Wentworth.
- Caulkins, Frances Manwaring (1849). Memoir of the Rev. William Adams, of Dedham, Mass: and of the Rev. Eliphalet Adams, of New London, Conn. Metcalf and Company.
- Hanson, Robert Brand (1976). Dedham, Massachusetts, 1635-1890. Dedham Historical Society.
