= Coast Guard Station New London =

US Coast Guard station in Connecticut

Coordinates: 41°20′44″N 72°05′36″W

Coast Guard Station New London is a United States Coast Guard station located in New London, Connecticut. It is a unit of Coast Guard Sector Long Island Sound and is located next to Fort Trumbull.

== History ==
The first fort was constructed on the site in 1775. In 1798, the State of Connecticut ceded the property to the Federal government of the United States, and the site has housed military buildings since then. Stone buildings near Fort Trumbull began to house the United States Revenue Cutter Service School of Commissioned Officers in 1910. In 1915, the Revenue Cutter Service was merged with the United States Life-Saving Service to form the United States Coast Guard, and the School of Commissioned Officers became the United States Coast Guard Academy. The Academy moved to its present-day campus in New London in 1932, and the old campus became Coast Guard Operating Base Fort Trumbull.

The base was important during the Prohibition era and World War II. The Coast Guard was a small force at the beginning of Prohibition, but it was greatly enlarged starting in 1924 in order to intercept rumrunning ships, and New London became the nation's largest Coast Guard base within two years.

In 1948, the Coast Guard transferred 13.62 acres of Fort Trumbull buildings to the Department of the Navy but retained buildings 45 and 12 and pier 2 as a tenant. The 1995 Base Realignment and Closure Commission (BRAC) recommended that the New London Detachment of the Naval Undersea Warfare Center be disestablished and the facility be transferred to the Coast Guard after the closure. This recommendation was adopted, and the location was returned to the Coast Guard in April 1997, after the New London detachment closed. The Navy Submarine Base, New London, Magnetic Silencing Facility remains at the station as a tenant of the Coast Guard.

Today, Station New London is part of Coast Guard Sector Long Island Sound within the First Coast Guard District. Units housed at the station conduct search and rescue, recreational boating safety, maritime law enforcement, military readiness, pollution response, and port security activities, including enforcing two permanent security zones established along the Thames River. Since September 2015 the 87 foot US Coast Guard cutter Albacore (WPB-87309) has been based upriver at the United States Coast Guard Academy. The unit personnel complement is one officer, 45 active duty enlisted personnel, 13 Coast Guard reservists, and 10 Coast Guard Auxiliarists.

== See also ==
- United States Coast Guard Academy
- Naval Submarine Base New London
