= Ellen Culver Potter =

American physician

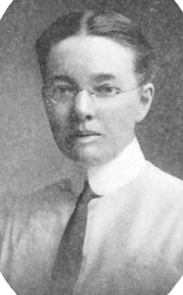
- Ellen Culver Potter, from a 1911 yearbook.
- Born: August 5, 1871; New London, Connecticut
- Died: February 9, 1958 (aged 86); Philadelphia
- Occupations: Physician, public health official

Ellen Culver Potter (August 5, 1871 – February 9, 1958) was an American physician and public health official.

== Early life ==
Potter was born in New London, Connecticut, the daughter of Thomas Wells Potter and Ellen Harris Culver Potter. She studied art as a young woman in Boston and New York City, and Europe. She worked at a settlement house in Chinatown, and started a settlement house in Norwich, Connecticut.

Potter graduated from the Woman's Medical College of Pennsylvania in 1903, and was an officer in the school's alumnae association.

== Career ==
Potter taught gynecology courses at the Woman's Medical College of Pennsylvania, and was medical director of the school's hospital. She also taught social hygiene at Bryn Mawr College. She worked in the Philadelphia school system as a medical inspector, and in 1920 became head of the Division of Child Health for the state of Pennsylvania. From 1921 to 1923, she served as head of the state's Bureau of Children. Potter was appointed Pennsylvania's Secretary of Welfare in 1923, by governor Gifford Pinchot, and was the first American woman to hold a secretary position in a state governor's cabinet. Her department oversaw public childcare, state hospitals, county jails, and other institutions. She served in this position until 1927.

In New Jersey, she was medical director of the New Jersey Training School from 1927 to 1937, medical director of the State Department of Institutions and Agencies from 1930 to 1946), and deputy welfare commissioner from 1946 to 1949. She was also superintendent of the Woman’s Reformatory and State Home for Girls. She was president of the New Jersey Welfare Council.

On the national level, Potter was president of the American Medical Women's Association (AMWA) from 1929 to 1930, and served on the President’s Commission on Social Security. She consulted for the Wickersham Commission on prisons and parole. She was a fellow of the American College of Physicians, the American Public Health Association. She was active in the League of Women Voters and the YWCA. She testified several times at Congressional hearings, on maternal health in 1921 and on medical staff shortages in 1941.

In 1936, Potter received an honorary Doctor of Laws degree from Rutgers College. She won American Public Welfare Association's W. S. Terry Memorial Award in 1948. From 1941 to 1943, she was acting president of her alma mater, the Woman's Medical College.

== Personal life ==
Potter died in 1958, aged 86 years, at the Woman's Medical College Hospital in Philadelphia. Her papers are the archives of the Drexel University College of Medicine.
