= Dorothy Satti =

American politician (1901–1960)

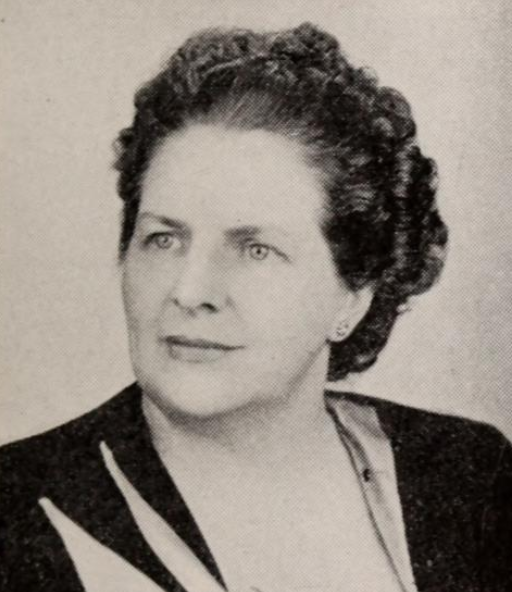

Member of the Connecticut House of Representatives from New London
- In office 1945–1947 Serving with Perry Shafner
- Preceded by: William C. Fox Jr. Griswold Morgan
- Succeeded by: Hubert W. Ryan; John M. Kamercia

Personal details
- Born: Dorothy May Heffernan; August 31, 1901 Brooklyn, New York, U.S.
- Died: September 28, 1960 (aged 59) Oswegatchie, New York, U.S.
- Party: Democratic
- Spouse: C. John Satti (m. 1925)
- Children: 4
- Education: Adelphi College

Dorothy May Satti (née Heffernan; August 31, 1901 – September 28, 1960) was an American politician who served in the Connecticut House of Representatives from 1945 to 1947, representing the city of New London as a Democrat.

== Personal life ==
Dorothy May Heffernan was born on August 31, 1901, in Brooklyn, New York. She was a graduate of Erasmus Hall High School and of Adelphi University, where she earned a bachelor's degree in 1923. She did postgraduate research at Columbia University and worked as a schoolteacher before marrying politician and physician C. John Satti, who would later serve as secretary of the state of Connecticut. The two were married in New York on June 25, 1925, and subsequently moved to New London, Connecticut. They had four children.

== Political career ==
A Democrat, Satti was elected to the Connecticut House of Representatives in 1944, and she served one term representing the city of New London alongside fellow Democrat Perry Shafner. She did not run for reelection in 1946, instead campaigning for the 18th district of the Connecticut State Senate. Satti's campaign was unsuccessful, and she was defeated by Republican candidate Robert P. Anderson.

== Death ==
Satti died of a cerebral embolism on September 28, 1960, at her summer home in Oswegatchie, New York. She was 59.
