= Sara Crawford Maschal =

American politician

Member of the Connecticut House of Representatives from Norwalk
- In office 1939–1941 Serving with William N. Garofalo
- Preceded by: Elbert W. Clark; Patrick H. Lyden
- Succeeded by: J. Garvan Cavanagh; Fred W. Buckley

Personal details
- Party: Republican
- Education: Connecticut College

Sara Crawford Maschal was an American politician who served in the Connecticut House of Representatives from 1939 to 1941, representing the town of Norwalk as a Republican.

== Personal life ==
Maschal was the second child of John and Sara Crawford. The younger Sara was known as Sally and married Webster Maschal. She and her sisters Janet and Susan all attended Connecticut College, with Maschal graduating in 1925.

== Political career ==
Maschal was a member of the Republican Party. Upon winning election in 1938, Maschal became the first woman to represent Norwalk in the Connecticut House of Representatives. Maschal and her mother were the first mother and daughter to have both served in the Connecticut General Assembly. Maschal unsuccessfully ran for reelection in 1940.

By 1967, Maschal and her husband moved to Laguna Hills, California. Maschal died in 1983.
