= James R. Newby =

American Civil War veteran

James Newby
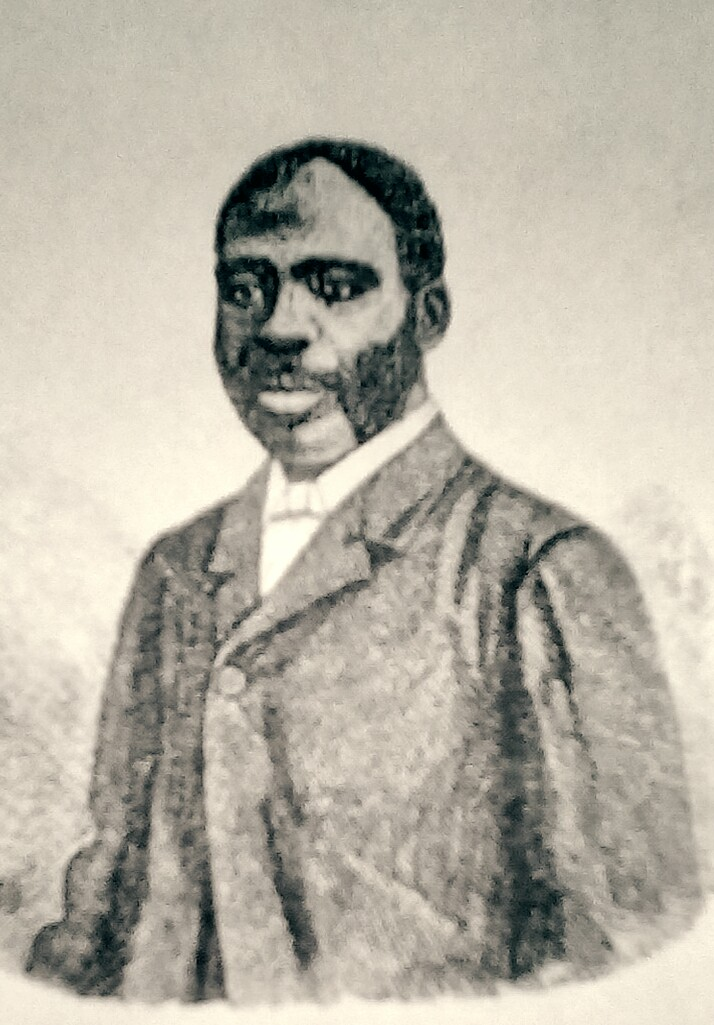
- Born: c. 1843; Connecticut, US
- Died: After 1884
- Occupation(s): American Civil War veteran; missionary

James Newby (c. 1843 – after 1884) was an American Civil War veteran who served in the first regiment of volunteer African Americans in the United States and a 19th-century African-American missionary to present-day Nigeria, Cameroon, and Liberia.

== Biography ==
=== Early life ===
Newby was born about 1843 in Connecticut. His father Aaron was a slave born in South Carolina who was freed because he was on a visit to Pennsylvania with his mistress after the Act of Emancipation for the Middle States had passed.

Newby grew up in New London, Connecticut and went to Wilberforce School/Wilberforce Institution and a boarding-school at Oberlin College in Oberlin, Ohio. He was sent to the navy to be a naval apprentice (first black naval apprentice) for fire-raising at the age of 11 and returned home to New London three years later and was involved in slave-running to Canada. He joined the infamous Mazeppa Club.

=== Family ===
James was married on 30 September 1880, in Manhattan, to Annie, the eldest daughter of Sir Robert Tainsh (A. Tainsh, author of An Improved Manual of Universal History, from the Creation of the World to the end of the 18th century published 1875), and worked as a missionary in Liberia, where his wife died. He returned to Britain through ill health.

=== Mariner and adventurer ===
He went to sea in the 1850s and was involved in the attempted rescue of Anthony Burns (1854). He sailed in the Marret attempt at circumnavigating the world in the smallest ship ever. He then went wild horse hunting in Mexico and joined Colonel John C. Frémont crossing the Rocky Mountains to California. He became a jig-dancer/sand-dancer and joined the original Christy's Minstrels (later Moore and Burgess of London). He sailed on the USS Niagara when she laid the first transatlantic telegraph cable (1858) and then again on the Niagara to Japan.

=== United States Civil War ===
In the American Civil War he fought in the 54th Massachusetts Volunteer Infantry from 1863 to 1865.

=== United States Navy ===
He was on the USS Wateree, a US naval gunboat, which was carried onshore by a tsunami following the 1868 Arica earthquake – he states this to have been at Callao but it appears that this incident actually happened more than 600 miles further south at Arica after the ship had left Callao.

=== Africa, Asia and Europe travels ===
He went to India at the time of the Indian rebellion of 1857 (Indian Mutiny).

He decided to tour Europe, and after visiting Greece (Olympic Games) and Germany (gambling at Baden-Baden), arrived in Edinburgh, Scotland, where he was converted through street evangelism of "Revivalists" Meek and Mitchell. He preached in the open air and churches in Edinburgh, studied at Henry Grattan Guinness' Harley House missionary training college in London and went to Nigeria and Cameroon as a missionary with the Anglicans, sailing with Bishop Samuel Ajayi Crowther on 20 July 1876. There he worked among Igbo people and visited mission stations at Fernando Po, Old Calabar, and Victoria (Limbe, Cameroon). After working in the Cameroons he arrived back in England 1879 after illness.

He is referred to as the "late Rev James Newby", and as having been in Africa in 1879, in Thomas Lewis Johnson's Twenty-Eight Years a Slave, or the Story of My Life in Three Continents, published in 1909, and as still living in 1884 – speaker at the Christian Institute, Bothwell Street, Glasgow.

Most of what is known about Newby's life comes from The Prodigal Continent and Her Prodigal Son and Missionary: Or the Adventures, Conversion, and African Labours of the Rev James R Newby which is cited in Judith Becker and Brian Stanley (eds), Europe as the Other: External Perspectives on European Christianity, with the caveat "a questionable account which invites closer scholarly enquiry".

== Sources ==
- Autobiography: Newby, James R; McHardie, Elizabeth; Allan, Andrew: The Prodigal Continent and Her Prodigal Son and Missionary: Or the Adventures, Conversion, and African Labours of the Rev James R Newby; with Special Chapters on Africa and Its Condition. London: Morgan and Scott, 1885
- Autobiography of a fellow-missionary: Thomas Lewis Johnson: Twenty-Eight Years a Slave, or the Story of My Life in Three Continents, Bournemouth: W. Math and Sons Limited, Printers and Publishers, 1909.
