= Sara Crawford =

American politician (1876–1949)

Sara Buek Crawford
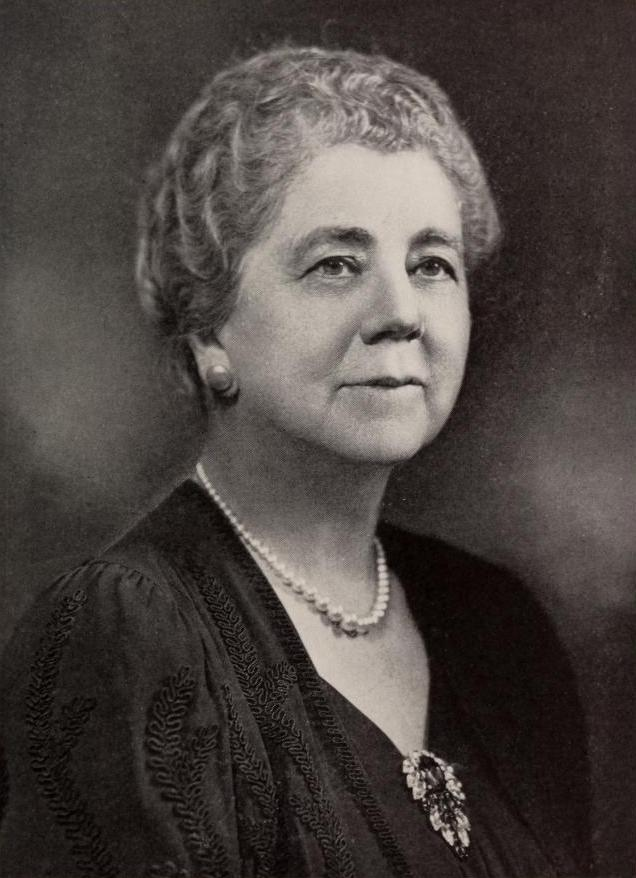
- Crawford in 1940

Secretary of State of Connecticut
- In office January 4, 1939 – 1941
- Governor: Raymond E. Baldwin
- Preceded by: C. John Satti
- Succeeded by: Chase G. Woodhouse

Personal details
- Born: Sara Augusta Buek; November 2, 1876 New York City, US
- Died: August 9, 1949 (aged 72) Norwalk, Connecticut, US
- Party: Republican
- Relatives: Sara Crawford Maschal (daughter)
- Occupation: Politician

Sara Augusta Buek Crawford (November 2, 1876 – August 9, 1949) was an American politician from Connecticut affiliated with the Republican Party. She served as Secretary of the State of Connecticut from 1939 to 1941, ousting Democratic incumbent C. John Satti to become the first woman to hold that office in the state's history. Crawford had previously served as a member of the Connecticut House of Representatives from 1925 to 1927 and again from 1931 to 1937.

Sara Augusta Buek was born in New York City to Charles and Sarah Rafferty Buek. She married realtor John Crawford in 1899, with whom she had three children, Janet, Sara, and Susan. The family lived in Westport, Connecticut.

A suffragist, Crawford was an early member of the Westport Equal Franchise League. She served as president of the Westport Republican Women's Club for eight years and vice chair of the Republican Town Committee for twelve years. She was elected to the Connecticut House of Representatives from 1925 to 1927 and 1931–1937, then served as Secretary of State of Connecticut between 1939 and 1941. Crawford was the first in a long series of women to serve as Secretary of the State of Connecticut, an office traditionally held by women after 1939.

Crawford and her daughter Sara Crawford Maschal became the first mother–daughter pair to serve in the Connecticut House of Representatives, when the latter won election in 1938, from Norwalk.

Crawford died on August 9, 1949, aged 72, at Norwalk Hospital.

== See also ==
- List of female state secretaries of state in the United States
