= Eliphalet Adams =

The Reverend Eliphalet Adams

Orders
- Ordination: February 9, 1709 by Gurdon Saltonstall

Personal details
- Born: March 26, 1677 Dedham, Massachusetts
- Died: October 4, 1753 (aged 76) New London, Connecticut
- Parents: Rev. William Adams; Mary Manning
- Spouse: Lydia Pygan (m. 1709)
- Education: Harvard University

Eliphalet Adams (/əˈlaɪfəlɛt/; March 26, 1677 — October 4, 1753) was an eminent minister of New London, Connecticut. He graduated from Harvard University in 1694. He was ordained February 9, 1709, and died on October 4, 1753, aged 76. Dr. Chauncy spoke of him as a great "Hebrician".

He published a sermon on the death of Rev. James Noyes of Stonington; election sermons, 1710 and 1733; a discourse, occasioned by a distressing storm on March 3, 1717; a thanksgiving sermon in 1721 and gave a sermon on the death of Gov. Leverett Saltonstall I in 1724.

He spoke at the ordinations of William Gager, May 27, 1725 and Thomas Clap, 1726; and at a discourse before a society of young men in 1727.
