= C. John Satti =

American politician and physician (1895–1968)

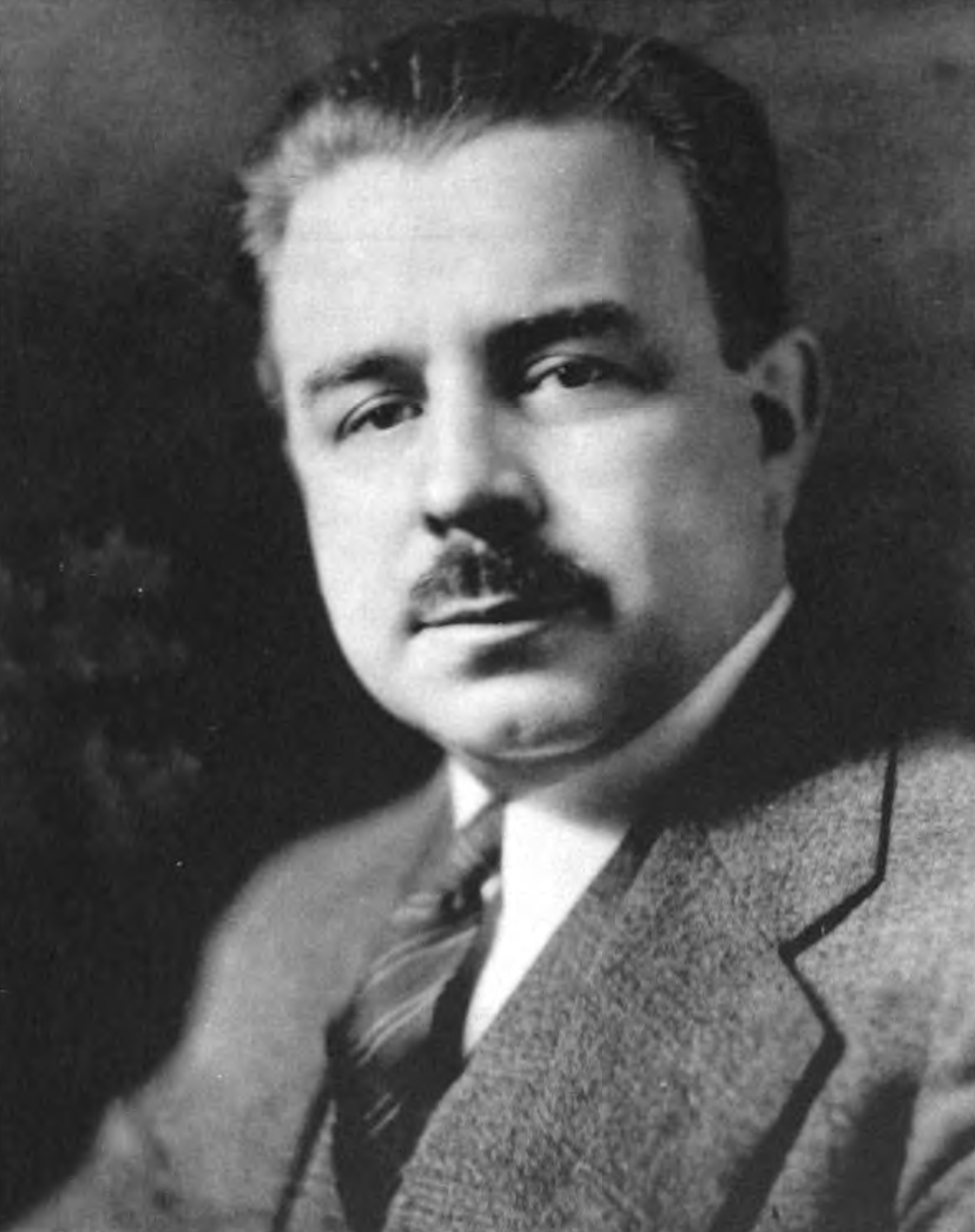
- Satti in 1938

Secretary of the State of Connecticut
- In office January 1935 – January 1939
- Governor: Wilbur Lucius Cross
- Preceded by: John A. Danaher
- Succeeded by: Sara B. Crawford

Personal details
- Born: December 4, 1895 New London, Connecticut, US
- Died: May 7, 1968 (aged 72) New London, Connecticut, US
- Party: Democratic
- Spouse: Dorothy Satti (m. 1925; died 1960)
- Education: Rhode Island State College; Yale School of Medicine
- Occupation: Politician, physician

Charles John Satti (December 4, 1895 – May 7, 1968) was an American politician and physician. He was a Democratic party leader of New London and was Secretary of the State of Connecticut from 1935 to 1939. He commonly went by C. John Satti.

== Early life and education ==
Satti was born on December 4, 1895, in New London, Connecticut, to Charles and Maria Danesi Satti. Both parents were Italian immigrants from Tuscany. He graduated from Bulkeley School in 1915, attended Rhode Island State College, and received his MD from the Yale School of Medicine in 1923. He was a resident at King County Hospital in Brooklyn from 1923 to 1925 and then joined New Haven Hospital. In 1925, he launched a private practice in New London and remained in active practice for more than forty years. Satti was a long-time president of the New London Medical Association and a member of the city board of education and chamber of commerce, the Yale Alumni Association, and various Italian-American societies.

== Political career ==
Satti led the New London Italian American Democratic Club in the 1930s, building a strong political base and wresting partial control of the city's Democratic Party from the Irish Americans. He was long-time Democratic town chair in New London and served on the Democratic State Central Committee and as a delegate to the Connecticut Constitutional Convention of 1965.

Satti was elected Secretary of the State of Connecticut in 1934, ousting Republican incumbent John A. Danaher. Satti won reelection in 1936 but lost his second reelection campaign in 1938 to Republican nominee Sara B. Crawford of Westport. In a year when Republicans swept the statewide elections, Crawford garnered 203,949 votes to Satti's 192,706 votes.

== Personal life ==
Satti married Dorothy May Heffernan of Brooklyn on June 25, 1925. The couple had four children: John, Robert, Eleanor, and Dianna Maria Satti. Robert became an attorney and public prosecutor, while John became a physician after graduating from the University of Bologna. Dorothy Satti was the first woman to serve as a New London County commissioner. She died in 1960. C. John Satti died on May 7, 1968, at Lawrence + Memorial Hospital in New London at the age of 72.

Political offices
Preceded by John A. Danaher	Secretary of State of Connecticut; 1935–1939	Succeeded by Sara B. Crawford
