= Tauseef Satti =

Pakistani cricketer

Tauseef "Tazz" Satti (born 5 March 1980) is a former cricketer who played List A cricket for the Islamabad Cricket Association and Hawke Cup cricket for Northland Cricket Association (New Zealand). He moved to New Zealand in 2002, where he was a professional for Sydenham Cricket Club, Christchurch (2002–2005) and Northland Cricket Association (2007–2011).

Satti is also a developer of cricket gear brand Tazz Cricket.
