= New London, Connecticut =

City in Connecticut, United States

New London
- City
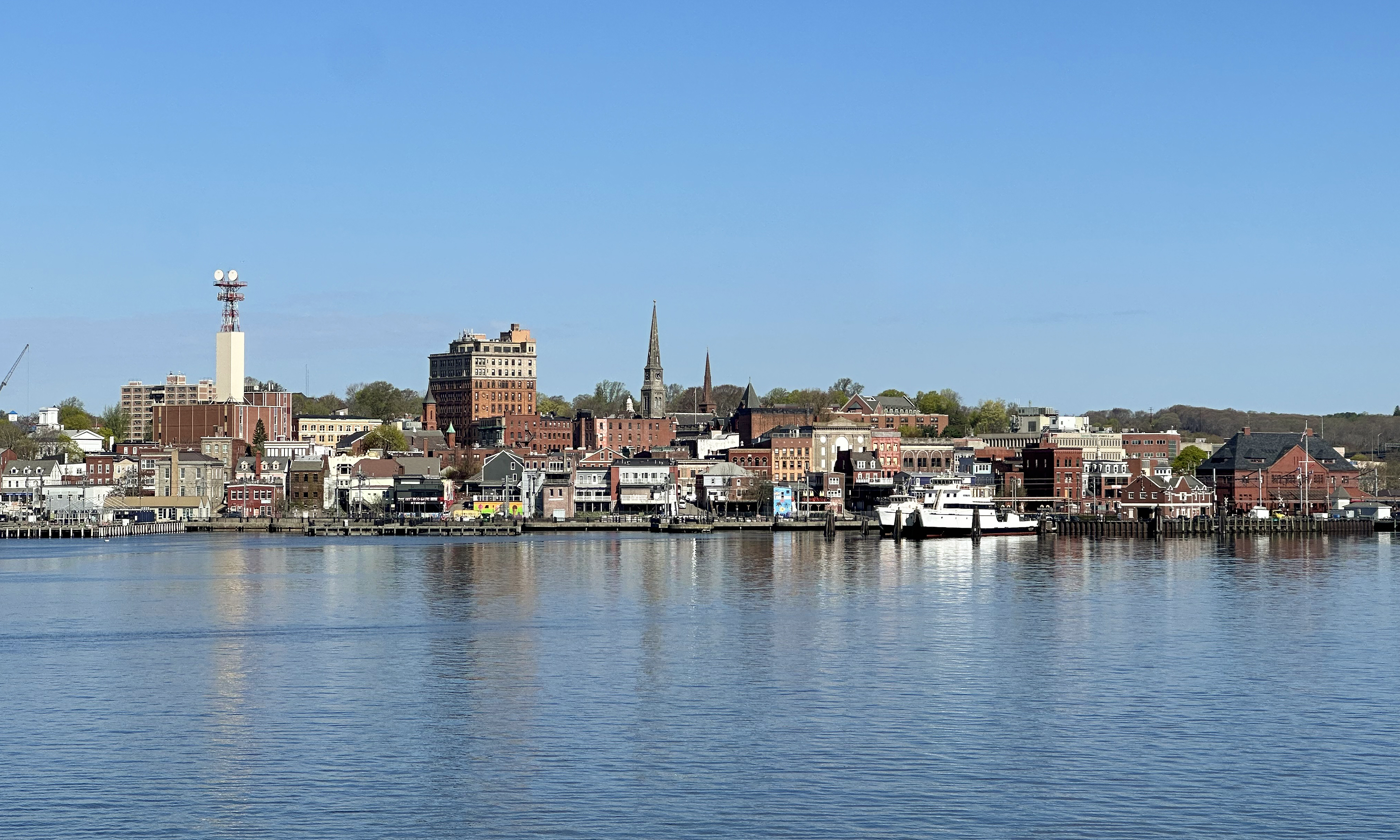
- New London waterfront (2023)

- Seal
- Nickname: The Whaling City
- Motto: Mare Liberum
- Coordinates: 41°21′20″N 72°05′58″W
- Country: United States
- U.S. state: Connecticut
- County: New London
- Region: Southeastern CT
- Settled: 1646 (Pequot Plantation)
- Named: 1658 (New London)
- Incorporated (city): 1784
- Named for: London, England

Government
  - Type: Mayor–council
  - Mayor: Michael E. Passero (D)

Area
  - City: 10.59 sq mi (27.43 km^{2})
  - Land: 5.61 sq mi (14.52 km^{2})
  - Water: 4.98 sq mi (12.91 km^{2})
  - Urban: 123.04 sq mi (318.66 km^{2})
- Elevation: 56 ft (17 m)

Population (2020)
  - City: 27,367
  - Density: 4,868/sq mi (1,879.6/km^{2})
  - Metro: 274,055
- Time zone: UTC−5 (EST)
  - Summer (DST): UTC−4 (EDT)
- ZIP Code: 06320
- Area codes: 860/959
- FIPS code: 09-52280
- GNIS feature ID: 0209237
- Airport: Groton–New London Airport
- Website: newlondonct.gov

New London is a seaport city and a port of entry on the northeast coast of the United States, located at the outlet of the Thames River in New London County, Connecticut, which empties into Long Island Sound. The city is part of the Southeastern Connecticut Planning Region.

New London is home to the United States Coast Guard Academy, Connecticut College, Mitchell College, and The Williams School. The Coast Guard Station New London and New London Harbor is home port to both the Coast Guard's cutter Coho and their tall ship Eagle. The city had a population of 27,367 at the 2020 census. The Norwich–New London metropolitan area includes 21 towns and 274,055 people.

== History ==
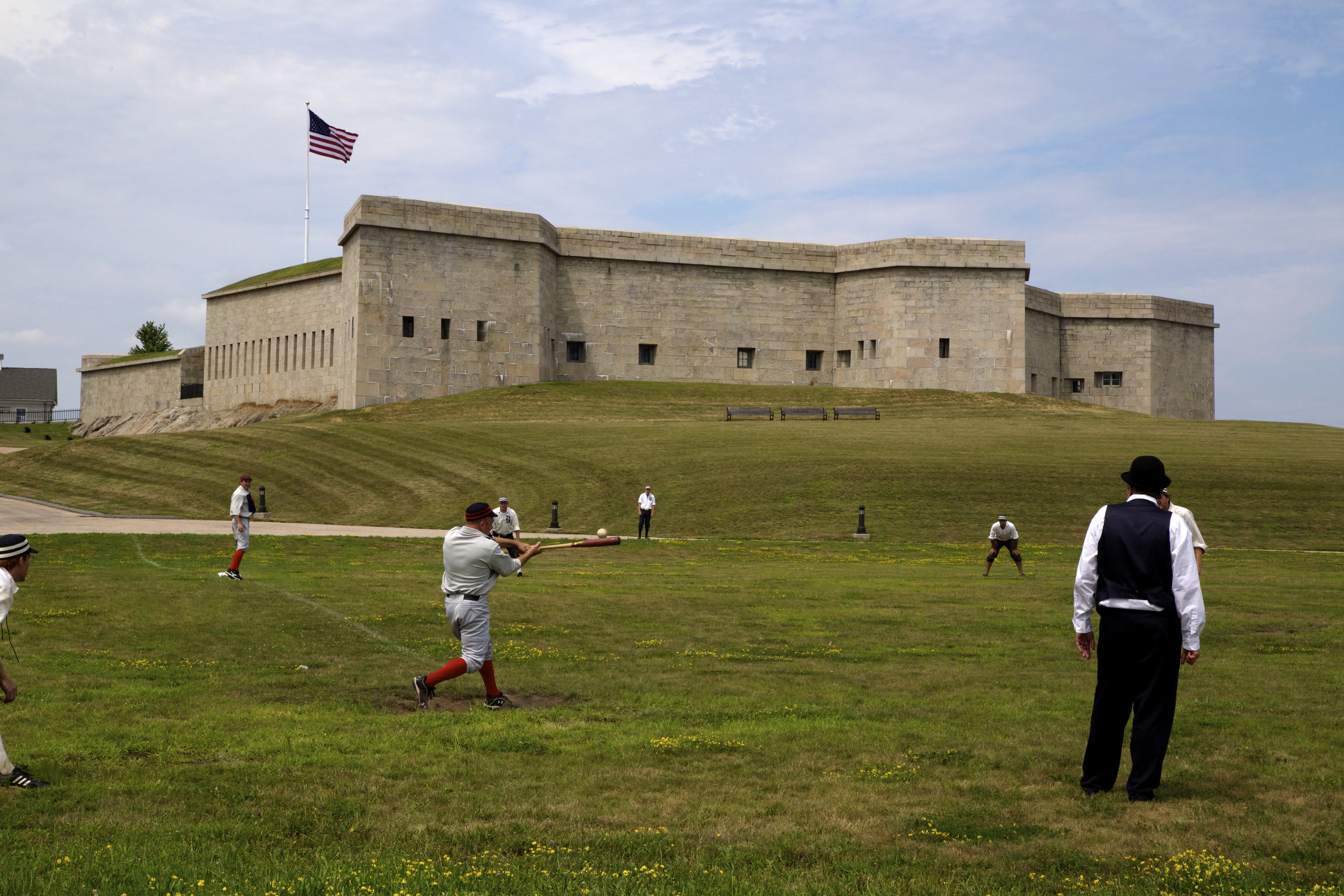
Fort Trumbull, originally built on this site in 1777. The present structure was built between 1839 and 1852.

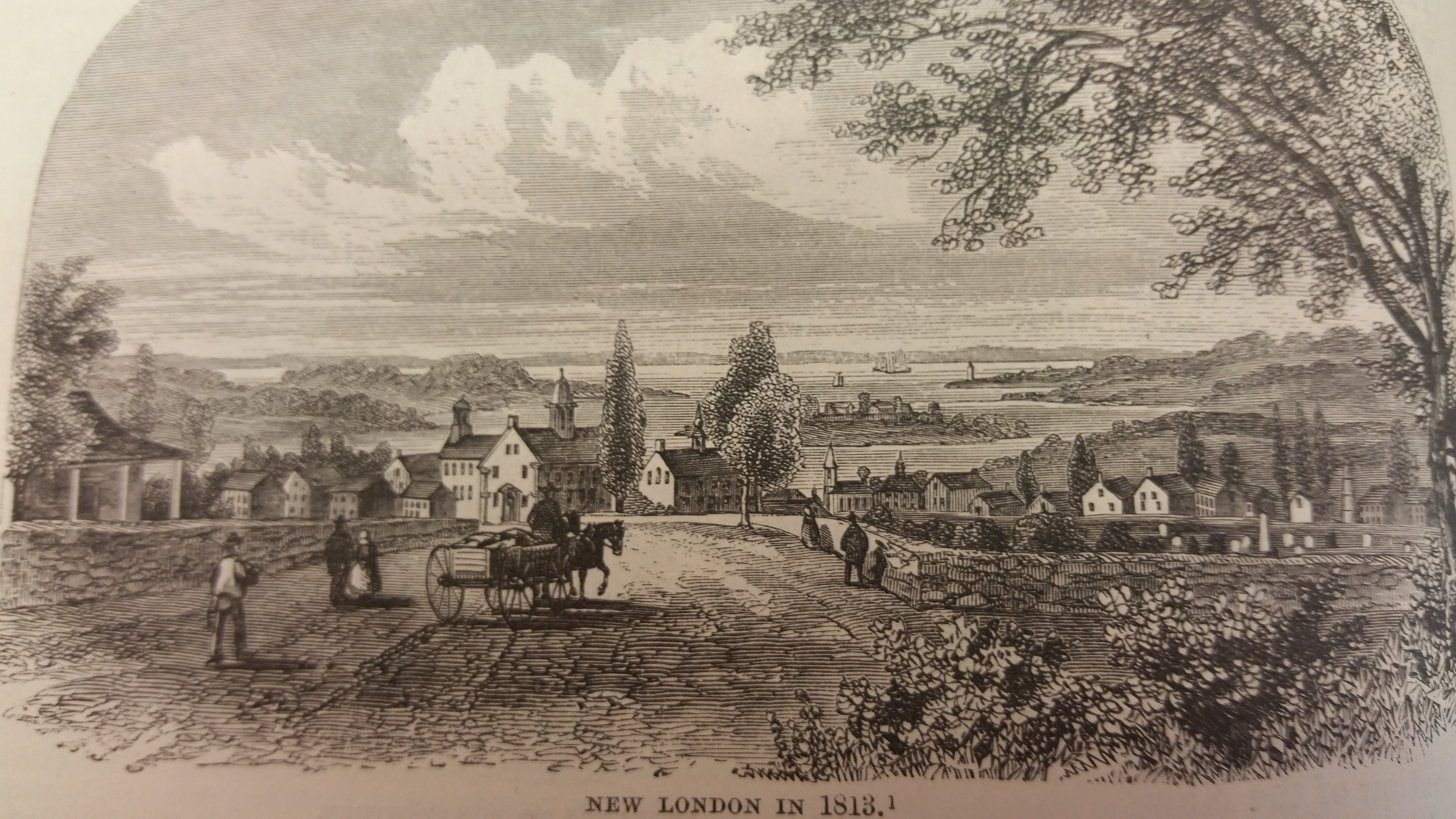
New London in 1813

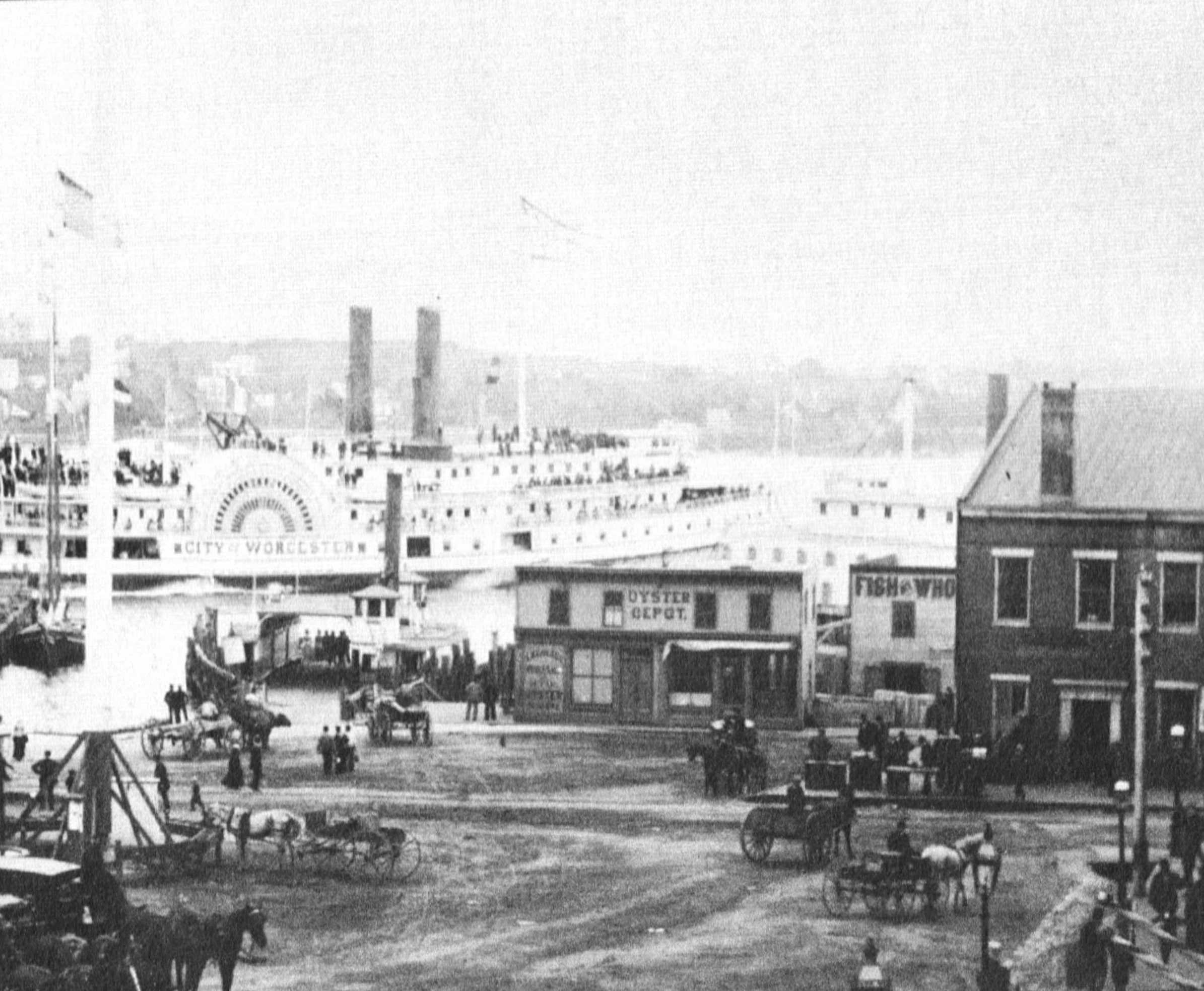
The Parade in 1883, with a railroad station built in 1864 at right (replaced by New London Union Station in 1887) and ferryboats in the river

=== Colonial era ===
The area was called Nameaug by the Pequot Indians. John Winthrop, Jr. founded the first English settlement here in 1646, making it about the 13th town settled in Connecticut. Inhabitants referred to it informally as Nameaug or as Pequot after the tribe. In the 1650s, the colonists wanted to give the town the official name of London after London, England, but the Connecticut General Assembly wanted to name it Faire Harbour. The citizens protested, declaring that they would prefer it to be called Nameaug if it could not be officially named London. The legislature relented, and the town was officially named New London on March 24, 1658.

=== American Revolution ===
The harbor was considered to be the best deep water harbor on Long Island Sound, and consequently New London became a base of American naval operations during the American Revolutionary War and privateers where it has been said no port took more prizes than New London with between 400–800 being credited to New London privateers including the 1781 taking of supply ship Hannah, the largest prize taken during the war. Famous New Londoners during the American Revolution include Nathan Hale, William Coit, Richard Douglass, Thomas and Nathaniel Shaw, Gen. Samuel Parsons, printer Timothy Green, and Bishop Samuel Seabury.

New London was raided and much of it burned to the ground on September 6, 1781, in the Battle of Groton Heights by Norwich native Benedict Arnold in an attempt to destroy the Patriot privateer fleet and supplies of goods and naval stores within the city. It is often noted that this raid on New London and Groton was intended to divert General George Washington and the French Army under Rochambeau from their march on Yorktown, Virginia. The main defensive fort for New London was Fort Griswold, located across the Thames River in Groton. It was well known to Arnold, who had already informed the British of this so that they could avoid its artillery fire. British and Hessian troops subsequently attacked and captured New London's Fort Trumbull, while other forces moved in to attack Fort Griswold across the river, then held by Lieutenant-Colonel William Ledyard. The British suffered great casualties at Fort Griswold before the Americans were finally forced to surrender—whereupon Arnold's men stormed into the fort and slaughtered most of the American troops who defended it, including Ledyard. All told, more than 52 British and 83 American soldiers were killed, and more than 142 British and 39 Americans were wounded, many mortally. New London suffered over 6 defenders killed and 24 wounded, while Arnold's men suffered an equal amount.

Connecticut's independent legislature made New London one of five cities simultaneously brought from de facto to formalized incorporations in its January session of 1784.

=== 19th century ===
After the War of 1812 began, the Royal Navy established a blockade of the East Coast of the United States, including New London. During the war, American forces unsuccessfully attempted to destroy the British ship of the line HMS Ramillies while it was lying at anchor in New London's harbor with torpedoes launched from small boats. This prompted the captain of Ramillies, Sir Thomas Hardy, 1st Baronet, to warn the Americans to cease using this "cruel and unheard-of warfare" or he would "order every house near the shore to be destroyed". The fact that Hardy had been previously so lenient and considerate to the Americans caused them to abandon such attempts with immediate effect.

For several decades beginning in the early 19th century, New London was one of the three busiest whaling ports in the world, along with Nantucket and New Bedford, Massachusetts. The wealth that whaling brought into the city furnished the capital to fund much of the city's present architecture. The New Haven and New London Railroad connected New London by rail to New Haven and points beyond by the 1850s. The Springfield and New London Railroad connected New London to Springfield, Massachusetts, by the 1870s.

Many distinctive structures built in the 19th century remain, but the First Church built in 1853 collapsed in January 2024.

=== Military presence ===
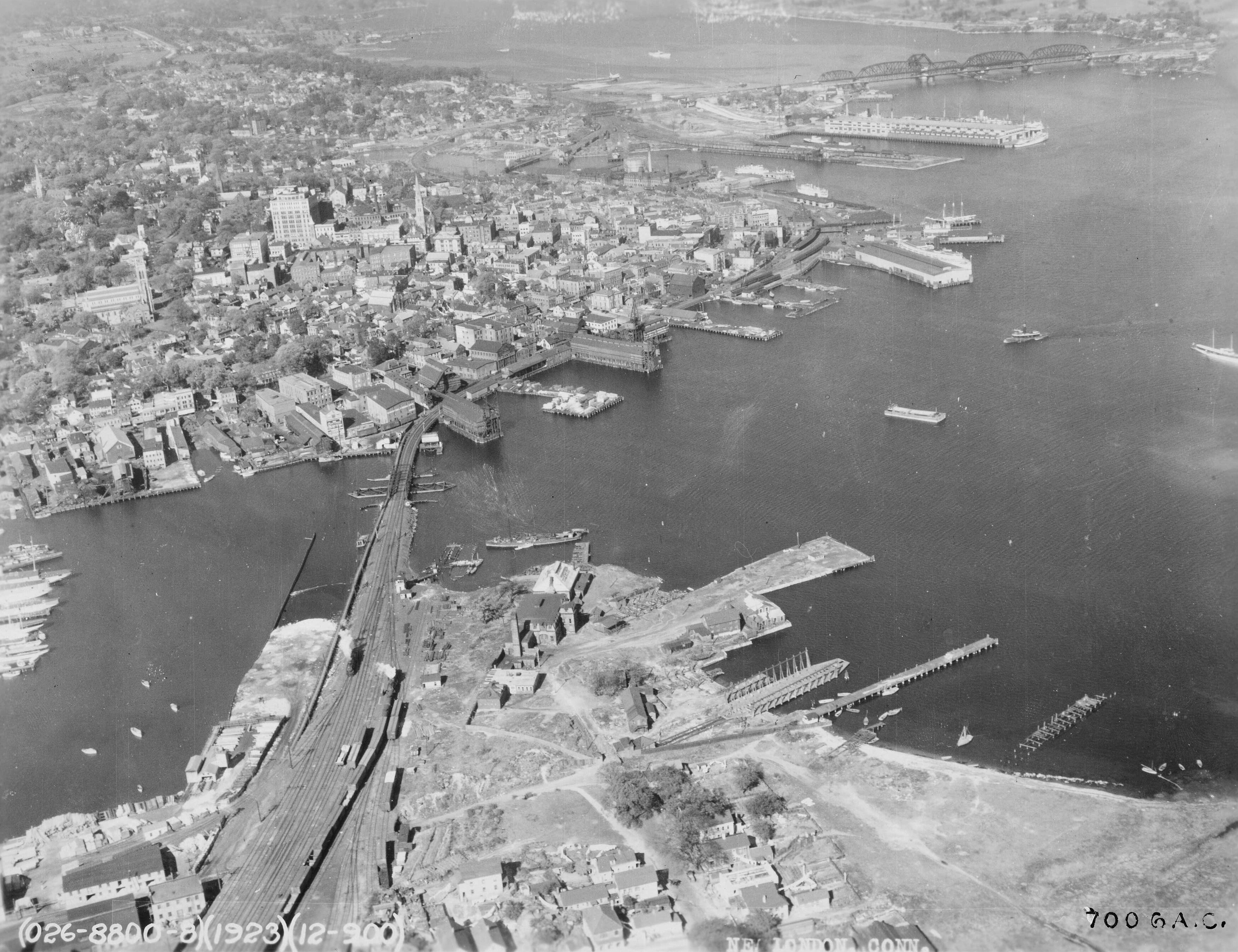
View of New London, 1930s

Several military installations have been part of New London's history, including the United States Coast Guard Academy and Coast Guard Station New London. Most of these military installations have been located at Fort Trumbull. The first Fort Trumbull was an earthwork built 1775–1777 that took part in the Revolutionary War. The second Fort Trumbull was built 1839–1852 and still stands. During the Red Summer of 1919, there were a series of racial riots between white and black Navy men stationed in New London and Groton.

By 1910, the fort's defensive function had been superseded by the new forts of the Endicott Program, primarily located on Fishers Island. The fort was given to the Revenue Cutter Service and became the Revenue Cutter Academy. The Revenue Cutter Service was merged into the United States Coast Guard in 1915, and the Academy relocated to its current site in 1932.

During World War II, the Merchant Marine Officers Training School was located at Fort Trumbull. From 1950 to 1990, Fort Trumbull was the location for the Naval Underwater Sound Laboratory, which developed sonar and related systems for US Navy submarines. In 1990, the Sound Laboratory was merged with the Naval Underwater Systems Center in Newport, Rhode Island, and the New London facility was closed in 1996.

The Naval Submarine Base New London is physically located in Groton, but submarines were stationed in New London during World War II and from 1951 to 1991. The submarine tender Fulton and Submarine Squadron 10 were based at State Pier in New London during this time. Squadron Ten was usually composed of eight to ten submarines and was the first all-nuclear submarine squadron. In the summer of 1960, peace activists from around the country gathered in New London to protest the all-nuclear submarines being based there. Participants held daily vigils and marches, handed out leaflets and talked with workers. Unable to achieve their goals by the end of the summer, some activists stayed in Connecticut and established the New England Committee for Non-Violent Action.

USS Fulton was decommissioned, after 50 years of service, in 1991 and Submarine Squadron 10 was disbanded at the same time. In the 1990s, State Pier was rebuilt as a container terminal.

=== Fort Trumbull ===
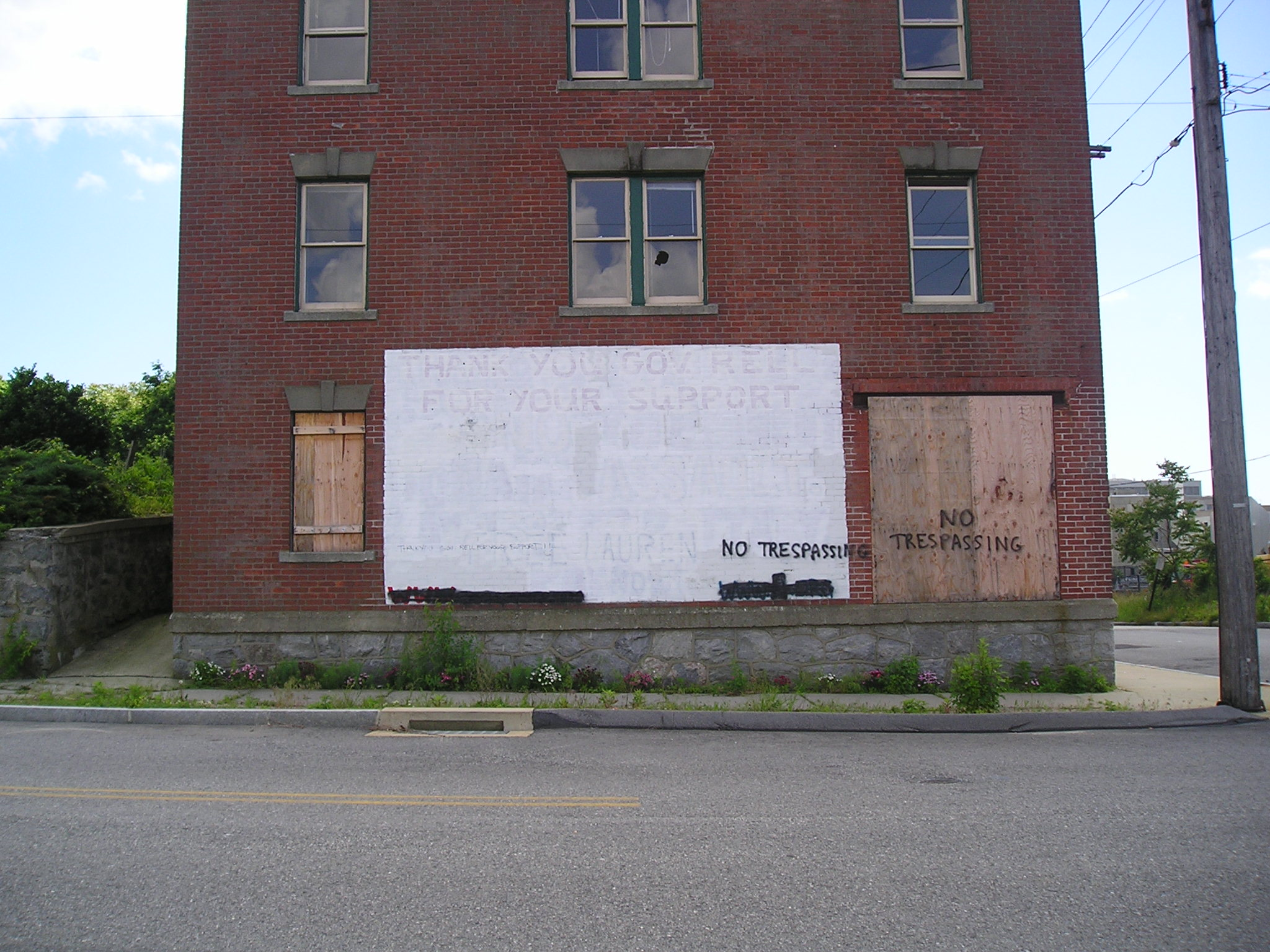
One of the few remaining houses in the Fort Trumbull neighborhood, June 10, 2007

The neighborhood of Fort Trumbull once consisted of nearly two-dozen homes, but they were seized by the City of New London using eminent domain. This measure was supported in a 5–4 ruling in the 2005 Supreme Court case Kelo v. City of New London, and the homes were ultimately demolished by the city as part of an economic development plan. The site was slated to be redeveloped under this plan, but the chosen developer was not able to get financing and the project failed. The empty landscape of the Fort Trumbull area has been widely characterized as an example of government overreach and inefficiency.

== Geography ==
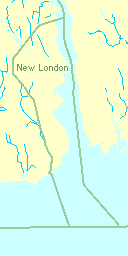
49% of New London's area is water.

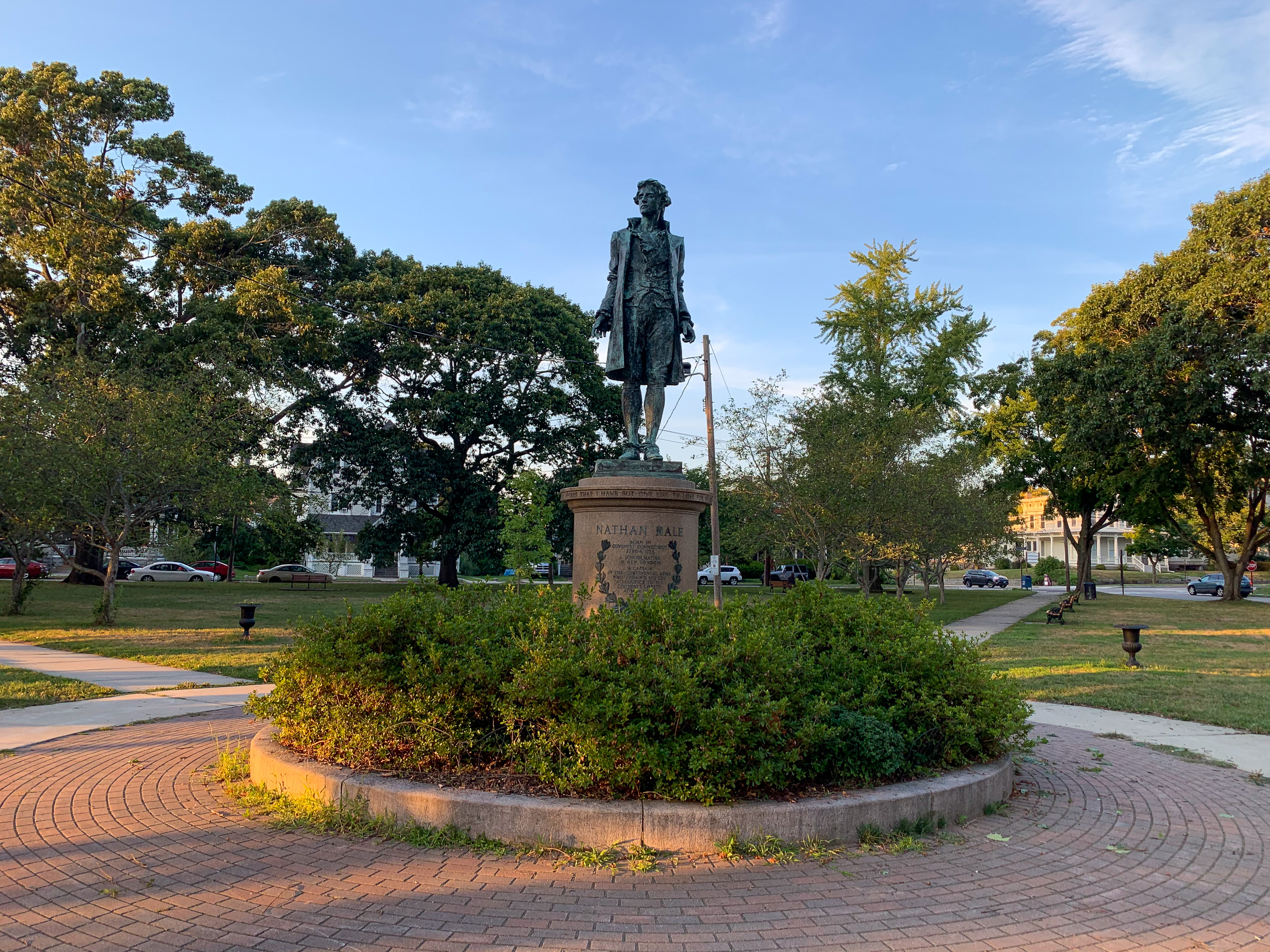
A statue of Nathan Hale in Williams Park

In terms of land area, New London is one of the smallest cities in Connecticut. Of the whole 10.76 square miles (27.9 km^{2}), nearly half is water; 5.54 square miles (14.3 km^{2}) is land.

The town and city of New London are coextensive. Sections of the original town were ceded to form newer towns between 1705 and 1801. The towns of Groton, Ledyard, Montville, and Waterford, and portions of Salem and East Lyme, now occupy what had earlier been the outlying area of New London.

New London is bounded on the west and north by the town of Waterford on the east by the Thames River and Groton and on the south by Long Island Sound.

=== Principal communities ===
- Downtown New London
- Ocean Beach

Other minor communities and geographic features include Bates Woods Park, Fort Trumbull, Glenwood Park, Green's Harbor Beach, Mitchell's Woods, Pequot Colony, Riverside Park, Old Town Mill.

=== Towns created from New London ===
New London originally had a larger land area when it was established. Towns set off since include:

- Stonington in 1649
  - This large area ran from the Mystic River to the Pawcatuck River, including Pawcatuck, Wequetequock, and the easterly half of Mystic. It stretched inland from Long Island Sound to Lantern Hill.
  - North Stonington was created from the northern half of Stonington in 1807.
- Groton in 1705
  - Ledyard (originally North Groton) created from a part of Groton in 1836.
- Montville in 1786.
  - Salem created from parts of Montville, Colchester, and Lyme in 1819
- Waterford in 1801.
  - East Lyme created from parts of Waterford and Lyme in 1839.
- Fishers Island officially left Connecticut and became part of New York in 1879.

=== Climate ===
Using the Köppen climate classification New London has a warm temperate climate. This zone is defined as having a monthly mean temperature above 26.4 °F (−3 C) but below 64.4 °F (18 C) in the coldest month.

The city experiences long, hot and humid summers, and cool to cold winters with snowfall on occasion. The city averages 2,300 hours of sunshine annually (higher than the USA average). New London lies in the broad transition zone between continental climates to the north in New England and southern Canada, and the humid subtropical climates to the south along the lower East Coast.

From May to late September, the southerly flow from the Bermuda High creates hot and humid tropical weather conditions. Daytime heating produces occasional thunderstorms with heavy but brief downpours. Daytime highs in summer are normally near 80 °F, with occasional heat waves bringing high temperatures into the 90's °F. Spring and Fall are mild in New London, with daytime highs in the 55° to 70 °F range and lows in the 40° to 50 °F range. The seaside location of the city creates a long growing season compared to areas inland. The first freeze in the New London area is normally not until early November, almost two weeks later than parts of northern Connecticut. Winters are cool with a mix of rainfall and snowfall, or mixed precipitation. New London normally sees fewer than 25 days annually with snow cover. In mid-winter, there can be large differences in low temperatures between areas along the coastline and areas well inland, sometimes as much as 15 °F.

Tropical cyclones (hurricanes/tropical storms) have struck Connecticut and the New London metropolitan area, although infrequently. Hurricane landfalls have occurred along the Connecticut coast in 1903, 1938, 1944, 1954 (Carol), 1960 (Donna), 1985 (Gloria). Tropical Storm Irene (2011) also caused moderate damage along the Connecticut coast, as did Hurricane Sandy (which made landfall in New Jersey) in 2012.

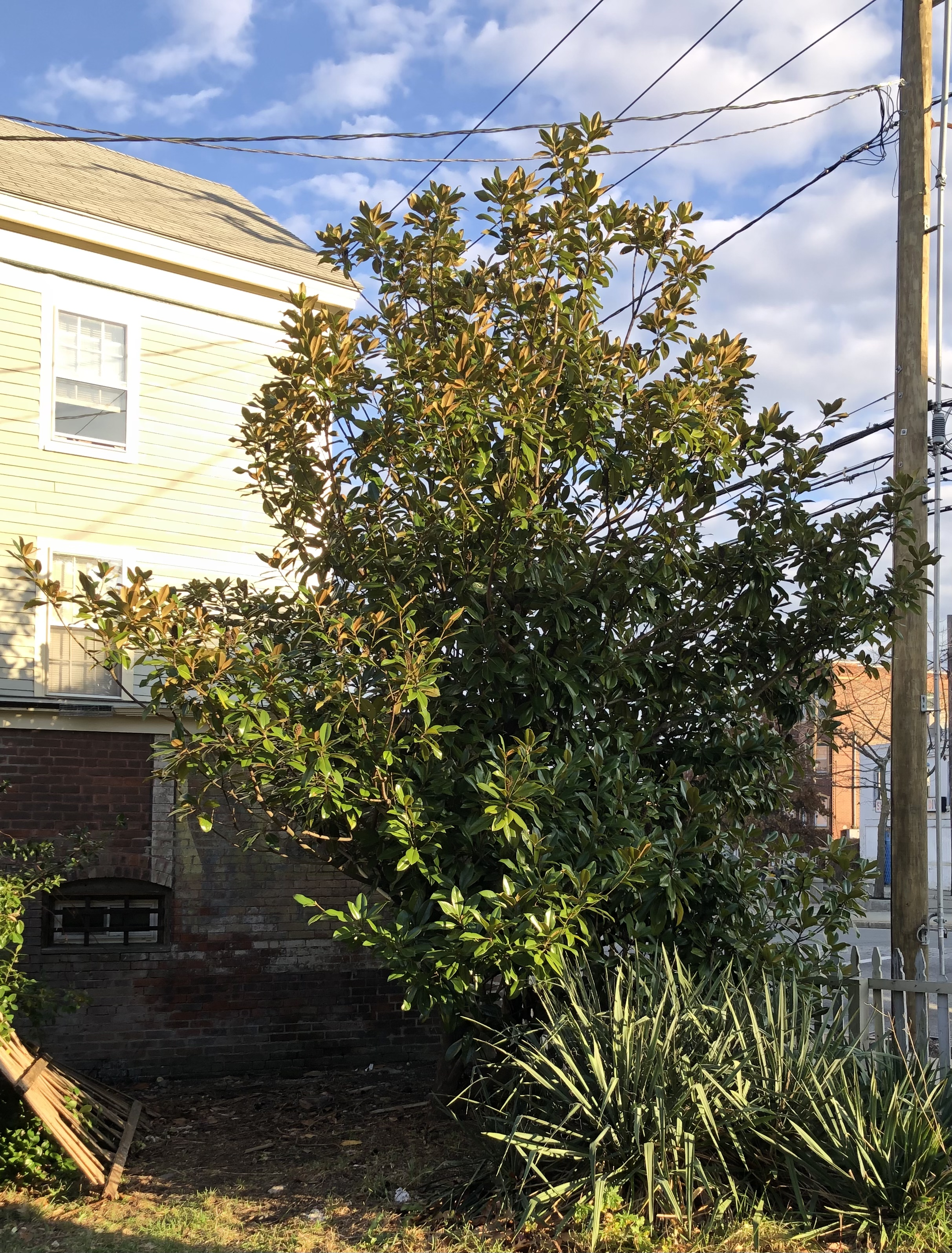
Mature Magnolia grandiflora on the north side of Bank Street (intersection with Montauk Avenue) in New London, Connecticut.

The Connecticut shoreline (including New London) lies within the broad transition zone where so-called "subtropical indicator" plants and other broadleaf evergreens can successfully be cultivated. New London averages about 90 days annually with freeze, about the same as Baltimore, Maryland. As such, many varieties of southern magnolia, needle palms, loblolly and longleaf pines, crape myrtles, Aucuba japonica, Camellia, trunking yucca, hardy bananas, monkey puzzle, various types of evergreen hollies, many East Asian (non-holly) broadleaf evergreen trees and shrubs, and certain varieties of figs are grown in private and public gardens.

The growing season is quite long in New London. Like much of coastal Connecticut and Long Island, NY, it averages close to 210 frost free days. The new 2023 USDA Garden Zone Map has New London in zone 7a. New London falls into the same garden zone as locations like Wilmington, Delaware, or Harrisburg, Pennsylvania. By the mid-to-late 21st century, the area is expected to fall within USDA zone 8 according to some models.

Climate data for New London (Groton) 1991–2020 normals, extremes 1957–2021
Month	Jan	Feb	Mar	Apr	May	Jun	Jul	Aug	Sep	Oct	Nov	Dec	Year
Record high °F (°C)	69 (21)	67 (19)	78 (26)	88 (31)	91 (33)	95 (35)	101 (38)	99 (37)	93 (34)	87 (31)	79 (26)	69 (21)	101 (38)
Mean maximum °F (°C)	56.6 (13.7)	55.8 (13.2)	65.5 (18.6)	73.6 (23.1)	81.9 (27.7)	88.0 (31.1)	91.6 (33.1)	88.7 (31.5)	84.7 (29.3)	76.5 (24.7)	67.4 (19.7)	60.0 (15.6)	92.6 (33.7)
Mean daily maximum °F (°C)	38.8 (3.8)	40.8 (4.9)	47.3 (8.5)	56.9 (13.8)	66.4 (19.1)	75.2 (24.0)	80.8 (27.1)	79.8 (26.6)	73.6 (23.1)	63.3 (17.4)	53.2 (11.8)	44.1 (6.7)	60.0 (15.6)
Daily mean °F (°C)	31.3 (−0.4)	32.9 (0.5)	39.5 (4.2)	48.9 (9.4)	58.1 (14.5)	67.3 (19.6)	73.4 (23.0)	72.5 (22.5)	65.8 (18.8)	55.2 (12.9)	45.5 (7.5)	36.8 (2.7)	52.3 (11.3)
Mean daily minimum °F (°C)	23.8 (−4.6)	24.9 (−3.9)	31.6 (−0.2)	40.9 (4.9)	49.9 (9.9)	59.3 (15.2)	65.9 (18.8)	65.1 (18.4)	58.0 (14.4)	47.1 (8.4)	37.9 (3.3)	29.5 (−1.4)	44.5 (6.9)
Mean minimum °F (°C)	4.1 (−15.5)	6.9 (−13.9)	14.7 (−9.6)	29.0 (−1.7)	38.1 (3.4)	46.8 (8.2)	56.0 (13.3)	54.2 (12.3)	43.6 (6.4)	32.2 (0.1)	26.6 (−3.0)	14.2 (−9.9)	1.5 (−16.9)
Record low °F (°C)	−14 (−26)	−12 (−24)	0 (−18)	14 (−10)	30 (−1)	38 (3)	47 (8)	41 (5)	29 (−2)	22 (−6)	8 (−13)	−10 (−23)	−14 (−26)
Average precipitation inches (mm)	3.91 (99)	3.42 (87)	4.92 (125)	4.40 (112)	3.67 (93)	3.93 (100)	3.42 (87)	4.19 (106)	4.29 (109)	4.42 (112)	3.75 (95)	4.59 (117)	48.91 (1,242)
Average snowfall inches (cm)	5.8 (15)	8.3 (21)	3.9 (9.9)	0.8 (2.0)	0.0 (0.0)	0.0 (0.0)	0.0 (0.0)	0.0 (0.0)	0.0 (0.0)	0.0 (0.0)	0.5 (1.3)	5.2 (13)	24.5 (62)
Average precipitation days (≥ 0.01 in)	11.4	9.7	11.5	11.6	11.9	9.5	9.7	9.3	10.2	10.4	10.0	12.4	127.6
Average snowy days (≥ 0.1 in)	3.1	2.7	1.7	0.3	0.0	0.0	0.0	0.0	0.0	0.0	0.2	1.9	9.9
Source: NOAA

Historical population
Census	Pop.	Note	%±
1800	5,150		—
1810	3,238		−37.1%
1820	3,330		2.8%
1830	4,335		30.2%
1840	5,519		27.3%
1850	8,991		62.9%
1860	10,115		12.5%
1870	9,576		−5.3%
1880	10,537		10.0%
1890	13,757		30.6%
1900	17,548		27.6%
1910	19,659		12.0%
1920	25,688		30.7%
1930	29,640		15.4%
1940	30,456		2.8%
1950	30,551		0.3%
1960	34,182		11.9%
1970	31,630		−7.5%
1980	28,842		−8.8%
1990	28,540		−1.0%
2000	25,671		−10.1%
2010	27,620		7.6%
2020	27,367		−0.9%
U.S. Decennial Census

== Demographics ==
=== 2020 census ===
As of the 2020 census, New London had a population of 27,367. The median age was 33.5 years. 18.9% of residents were under the age of 18 and 13.1% of residents were 65 years of age or older. For every 100 females there were 97.0 males, and for every 100 females age 18 and over there were 95.5 males age 18 and over.

100.0% of residents lived in urban areas, while 0.0% lived in rural areas.

There were 10,724 households in New London, of which 26.5% had children under the age of 18 living in them. Of all households, 26.7% were married-couple households, 27.6% were households with a male householder and no spouse or partner present, and 36.2% were households with a female householder and no spouse or partner present. About 39.4% of all households were made up of individuals and 12.4% had someone living alone who was 65 years of age or older.

There were 12,119 housing units, of which 11.5% were vacant. The homeowner vacancy rate was 2.3% and the rental vacancy rate was 7.8%.

Racial composition as of the 2020 census
Race	Number	Percent
White	13,174	48.1%
Black or African American	4,746	17.3%
American Indian and Alaska Native	302	1.1%
Asian	671	2.5%
Native Hawaiian and Other Pacific Islander	35	0.1%
Some other race	4,538	16.6%
Two or more races	3,901	14.3%
Hispanic or Latino (of any race)	9,326	34.1%

=== Recent economic estimates ===
According to the 2018–2022 American Community Survey, the median income for a household in the city was $56,237, and the median income for a family was $65,357. About 21.5% of the population was below the poverty line, including 36.4% of those under age 18 and 11.1% of those age 65 or over.

== Economy ==
New London was one of the world's three busiest whaling ports for several decades beginning in the early 19th century, along with Nantucket and New Bedford, Massachusetts. The wealth that whaling brought into the city furnished the capital to fund much of the city's present architecture. The city subsequently became home to other shipping and manufacturing industries, but had gradually lost most of its industrial heart. The State Pier (south of the Gold Star Memorial Bridge) is being converted to support some of the offshore wind power in the United States.

== Arts and culture ==
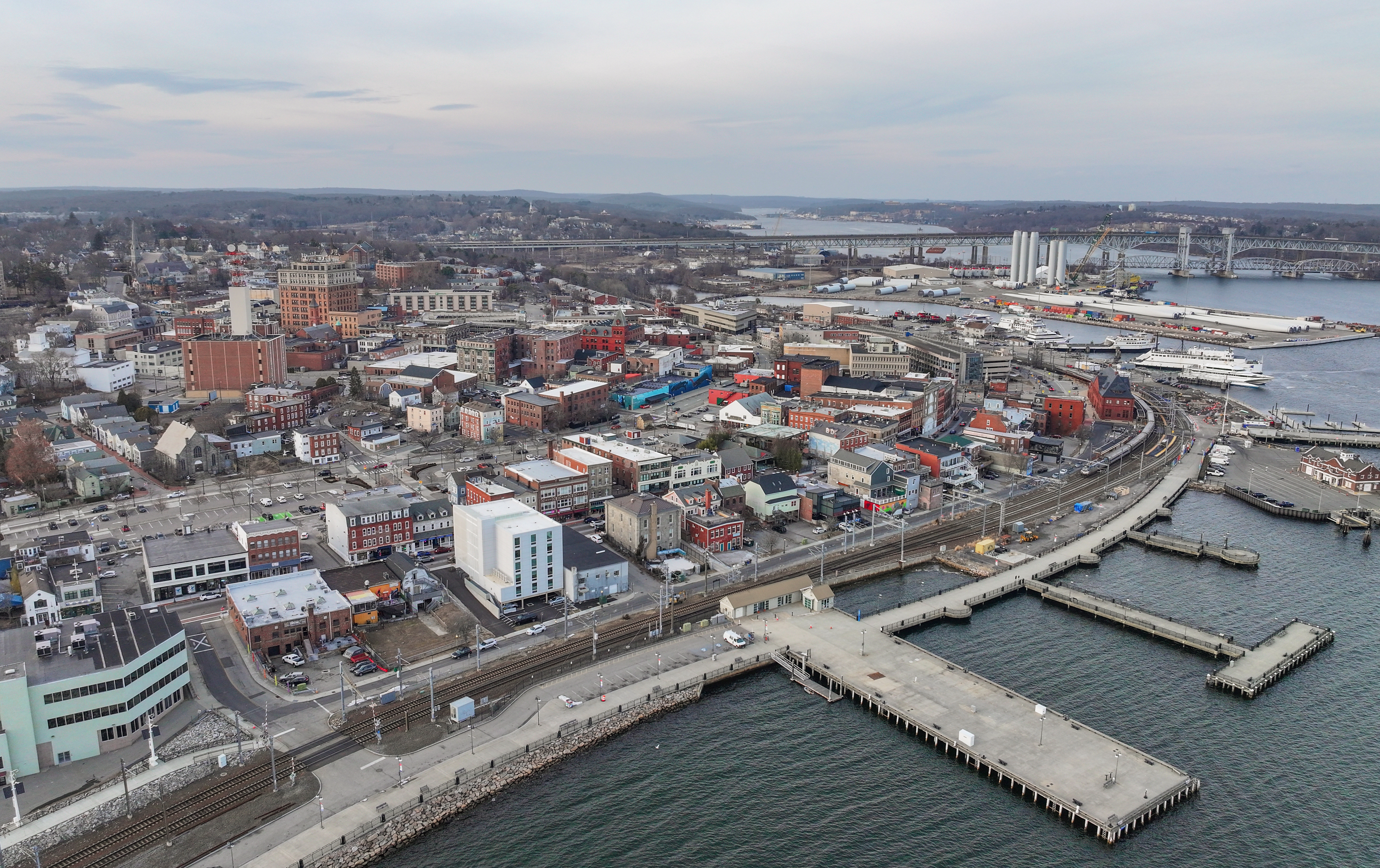
Aerial view of downtown

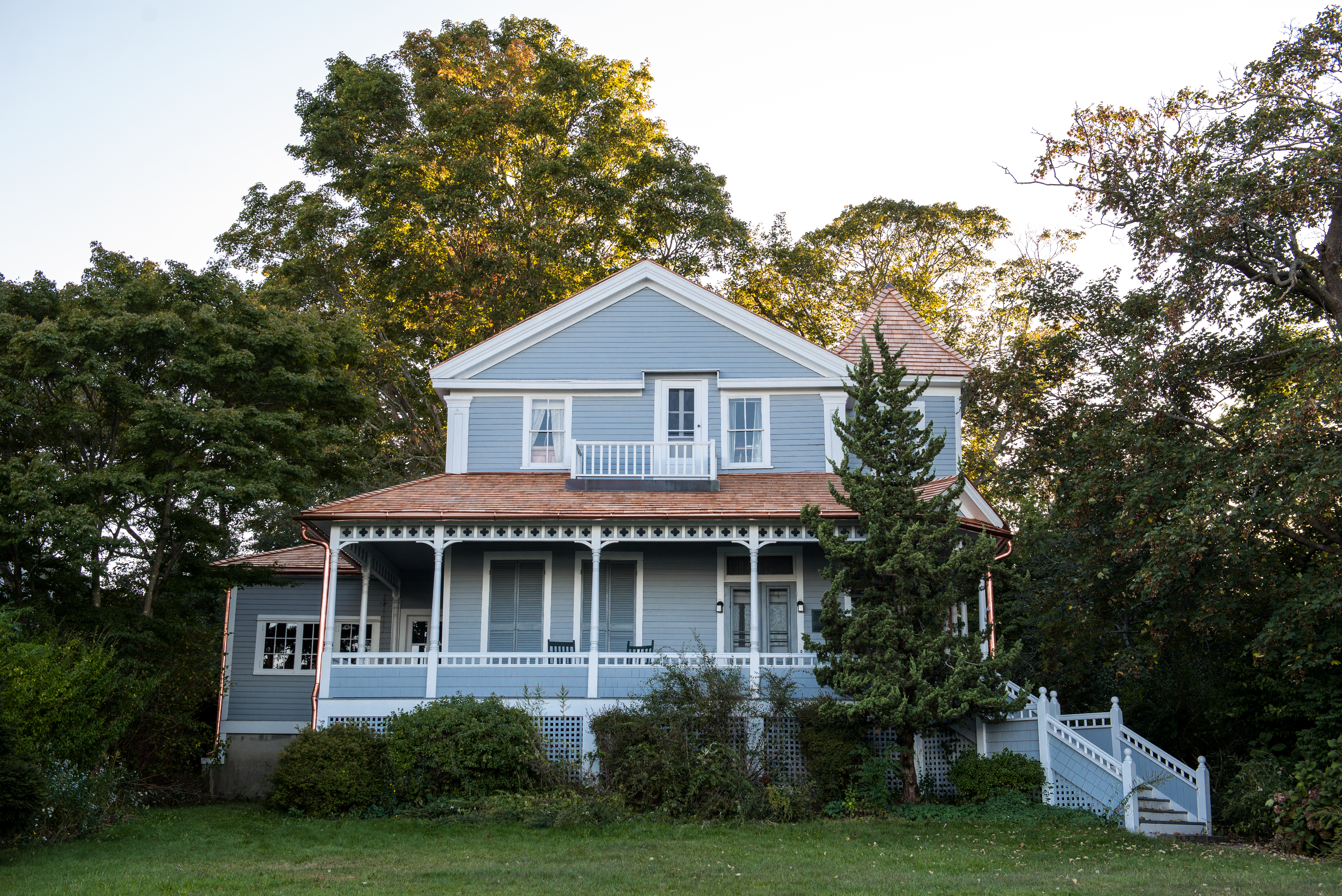
Monte Cristo Cottage, boyhood home of Eugene O'Neill

=== Eugene O'Neill ===
Nobel laureate and Pulitzer Prize-winning playwright Eugene O'Neill (1888–1953) lived in New London and wrote several plays in the city. An O'Neill archive is located at Connecticut College, and the family home, Monte Cristo Cottage, is a museum and national historic landmark operated by the Eugene O'Neill Theater Center.

=== Music ===
Notable artists and ensembles include:

- Eastern Connecticut Symphony Orchestra, founded in 1946 and led by Toshiyuki Shimada, who is also conductor of the Yale Symphony Orchestra in New Haven.
- The Idlers of the United States Coast Guard Academy, an all-male vocal group specializing in sea shanties and patriotic music.
- United States Coast Guard Band, founded in 1925 with the assistance of John Philip Sousa. Stationed at the United States Coast Guard Academy and attracting talented musicians from all parts of the country, the band is the official musical representative of the nation's oldest continuous seagoing service.
- The Can Kickers, a folk punk band.

=== Literature ===
In her Scenes in My Native Land, 1845, Lydia Sigourney includes the poem Sunrise at New London with descriptive passages relating to the district.

=== Sites of interest ===
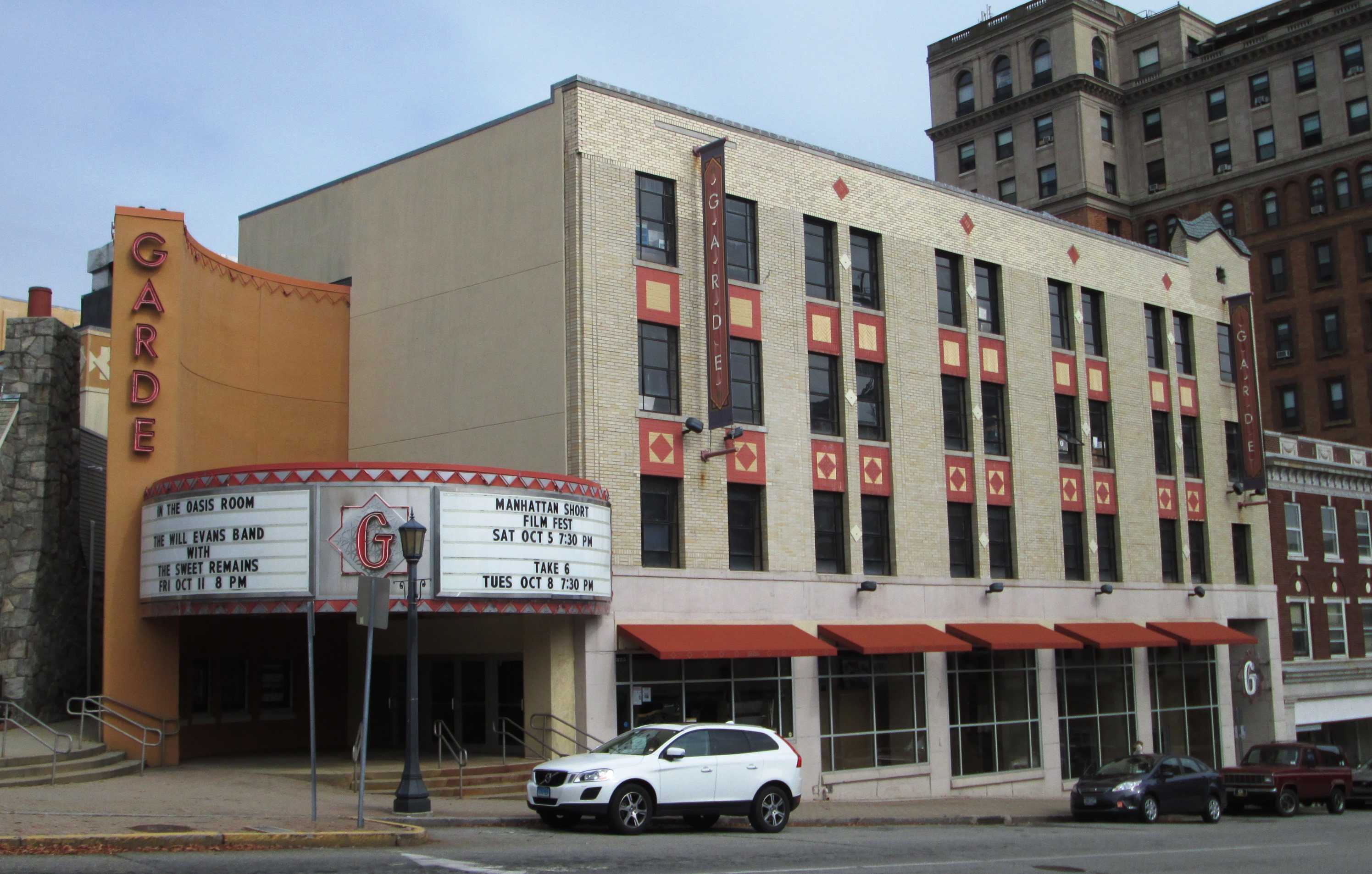
The Garde Arts Center in 2013

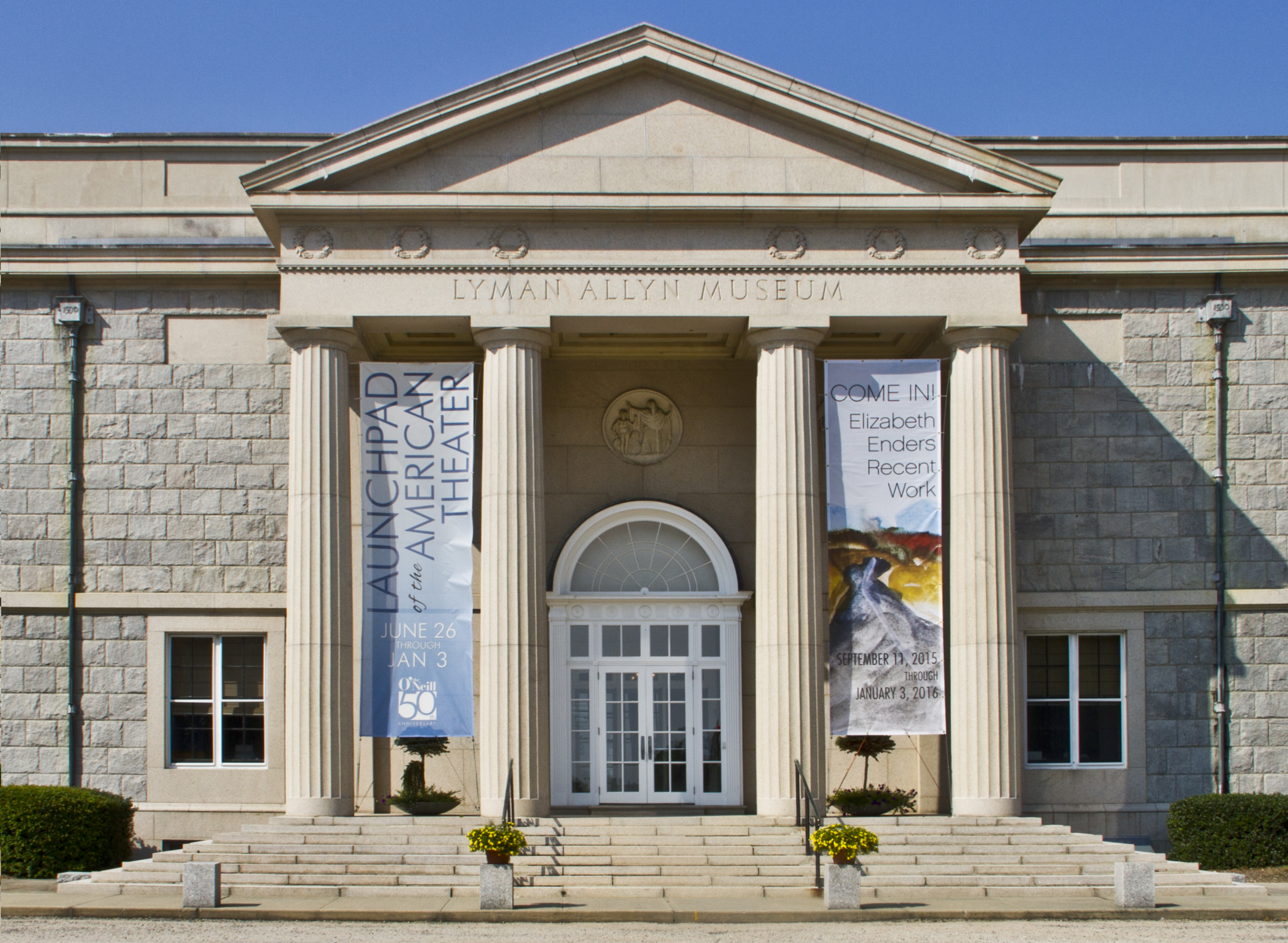
Lyman Allyn Art Museum, designed by Charles A. Platt

- Lyman Allyn Art Museum
- Ocean Beach Park
- New London County Historical Society, Shaw-Perkins Mansion (1758)
- New London Maritime Society, U.S. Custom House (1833), landing site of Amistad (1839)
- Fishers Island (7 miles off the coast of New London, but part of New York)
- Connecticut College Arboretum
- Fort Griswold (Groton)
- Fort Trumbull
- United States Coast Guard Academy
- Coast Guard Station New London
- Flock Theatre
- Garde Arts Center
- Hygienic Arts Gallery
- Joshua Hempsted House (1678)
- Monte Cristo Cottage & Eugene O'Neill Theater Center (Waterford)
- USS Nautilus (Groton)
- Ye Antientist Burial Ground
- Winthrop Mill (1650)
- Former Second Congregational Church (1870)
- The Pequot Chapel (1872)

== Government ==
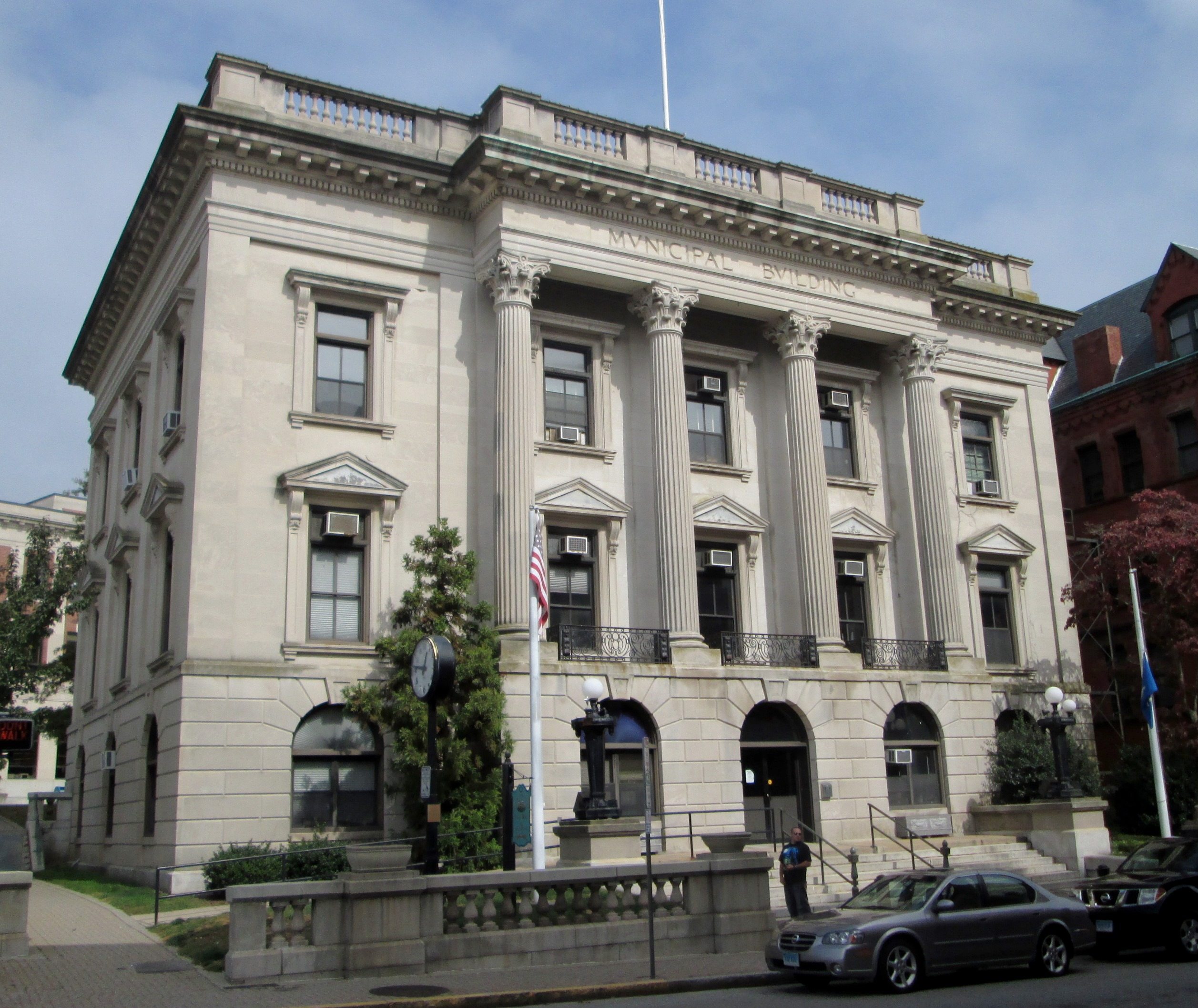
Municipal Building on State Street in New London (2013)

In 2010, New London changed their form of government from council-manager to strong mayor-council after a charter revision. Distinct town and city government structures formerly existed and technically continue; however, they now govern exactly the same territory and have elections on the same ballot on Election Day in November.

== Transportation ==
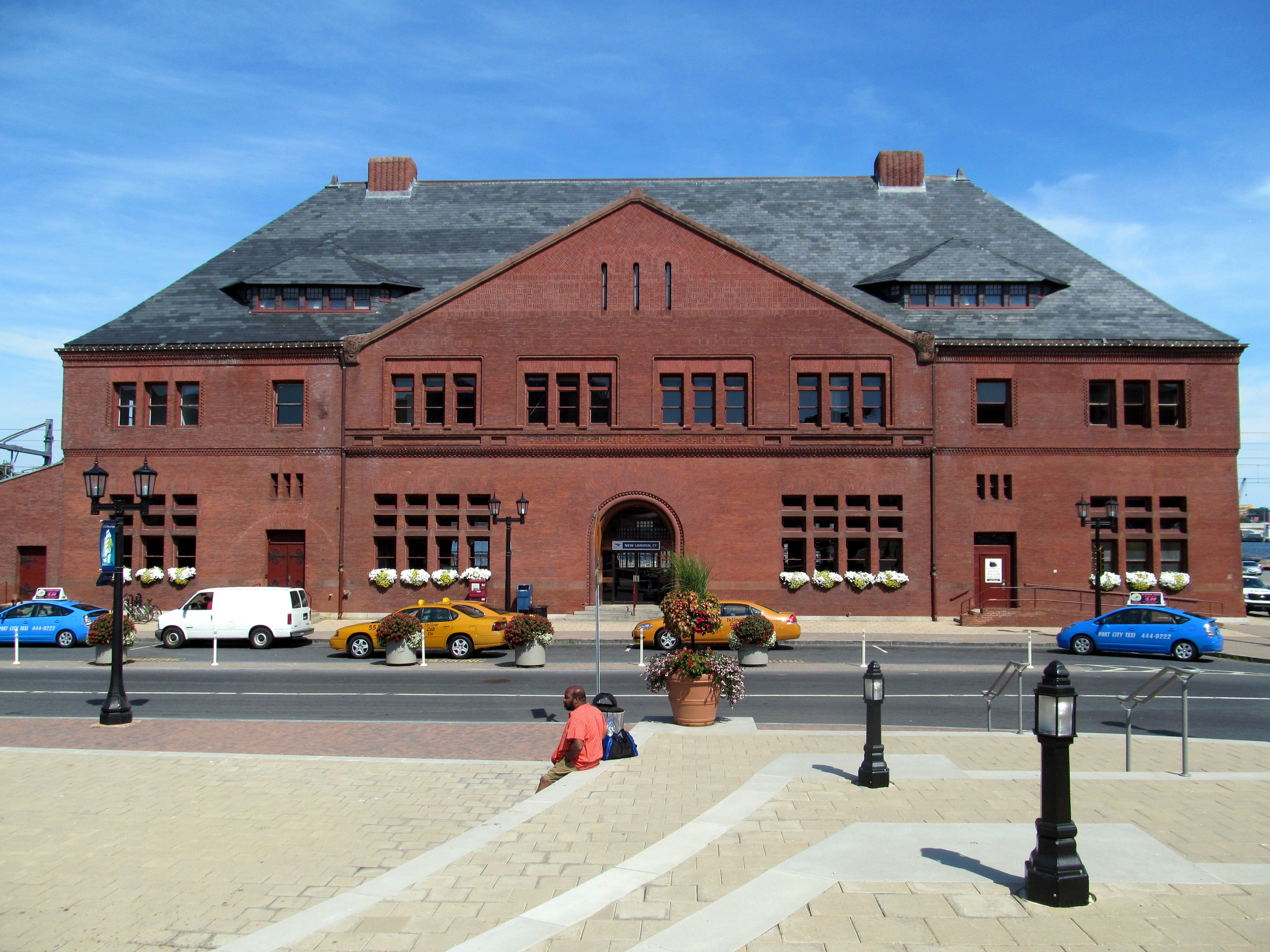
New London Union Station, designed by H.H. Richardson

Bus service includes regional Southeast Area Transit buses, Estuary Transit District buses, and interstate Greyhound Lines buses. Interstate 95 passes through New London.

New London Union Station is served by Amtrak's Northeast Regional rail service, and Shore Line East commuter rail service. The Providence and Worcester Railroad and New England Central Railroad handle freight.

Ferries include Cross Sound Ferry to Long Island, the Fishers Island Ferry to Fishers Island, and the Block Island Ferry to Block Island. New London is also visited by cruise ships.

The Groton-New London Airport, a general aviation facility, is located in Groton. Scheduled commercial flights are available at T. F. Green Airport and Tweed New Haven Regional Airport.

== Notable people ==
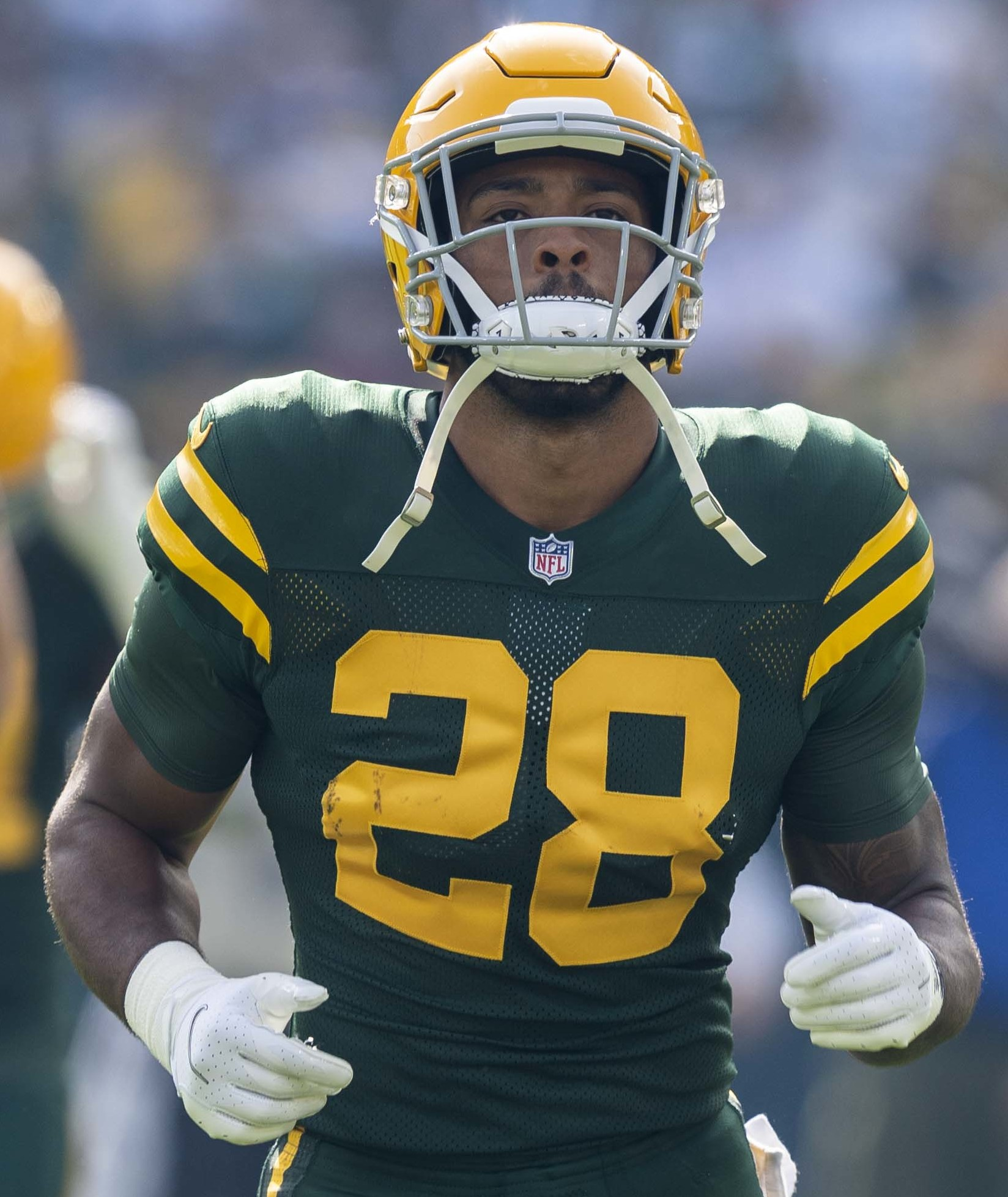
A. J. Dillon

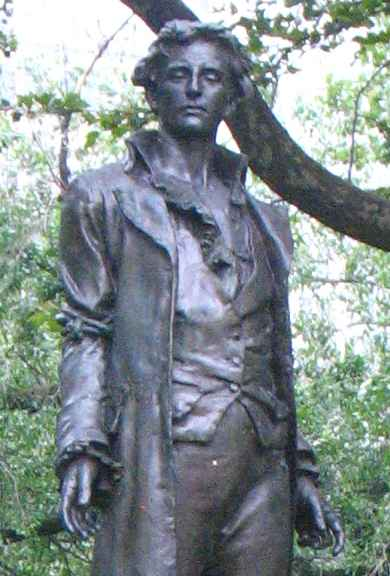
Nathan Hale

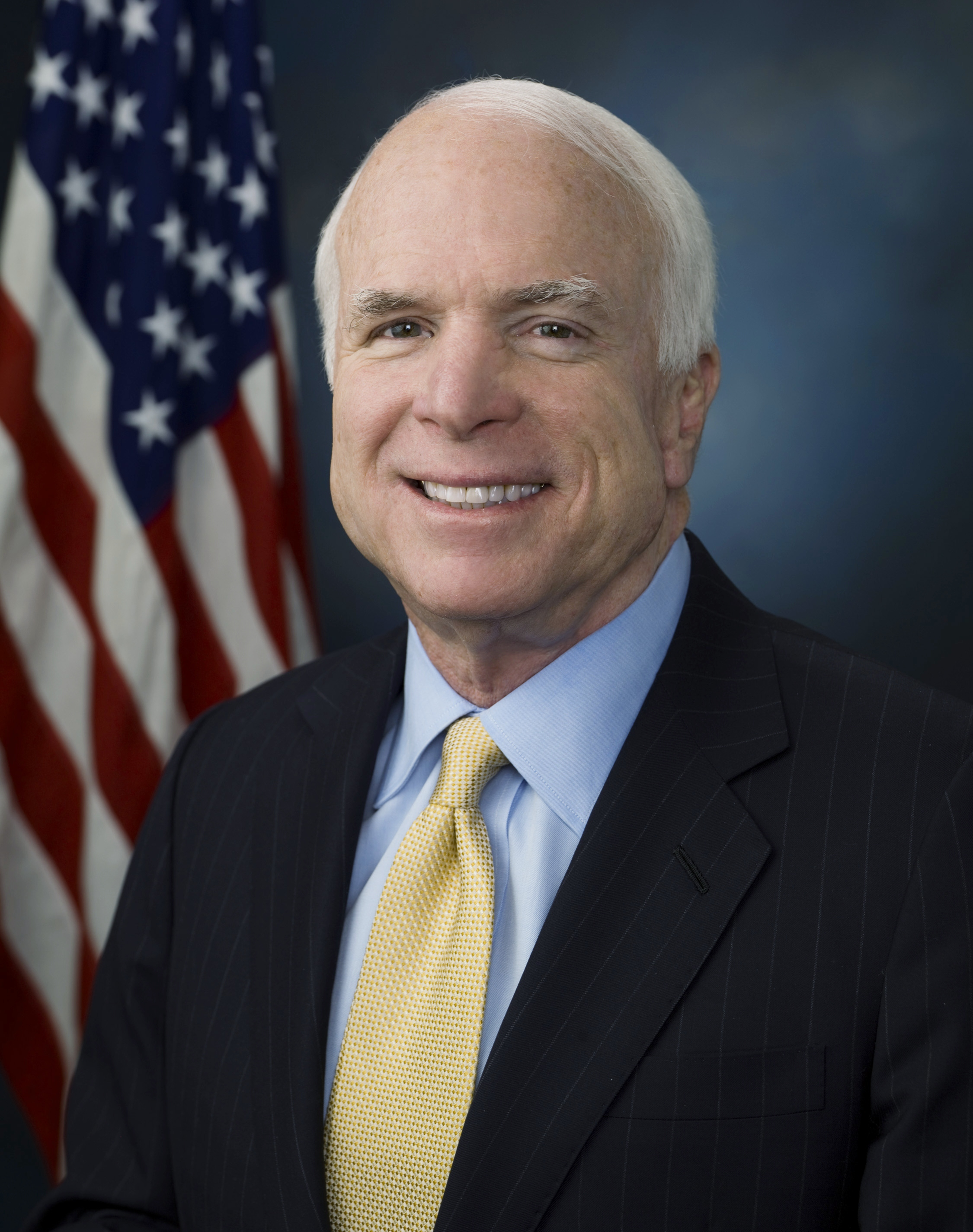
John McCain

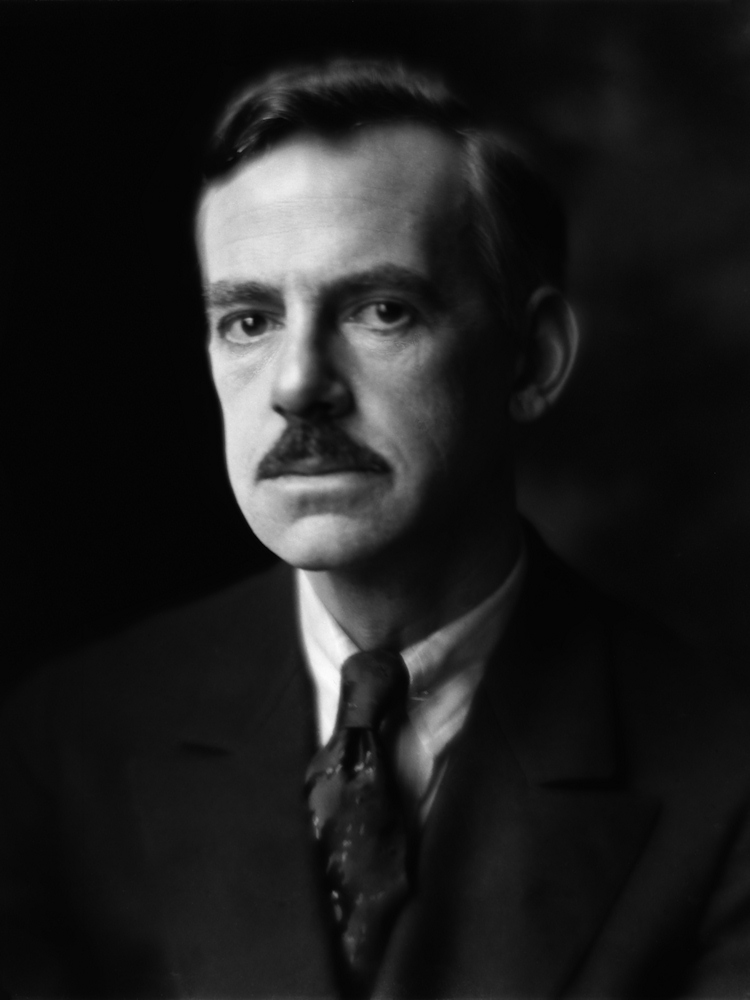
Eugene O'Neill

- Eliphalet Adams (1677–1753), clergyman
- Theresa Andrews (born 1962), winner of two Olympic gold medals
- Peter C. Assersen (1839–1906), Rear Admiral in the United States Navy
- James Avery (1620–1700), politician and military commander
- Valerie Azlynn (born 1980), actress
- Scott Barlow (born 1992), pitcher for the Cleveland Guardians
- Nathan Belcher (1813–1891), congressman
- James M. Bell (1837–1919), U.S. Army brigadier general, retired to New London
- Augustus Brandegee (1828–1904), judge, congressman, abolitionist
- Frank B. Brandegee (1864–1924), congressman and senator
- Amy Brenneman (born 1964), actress
- Henry Burbeck (1754–1848), brigadier general
- Daniel Burrows (1756–1858), congressman
- John Button (soldier) (1772–1861), American-born Upper Canada settler (founder of Buttonville, Ontario), sedentary Canadian militia officer and founder of the 1st York Light Dragoons
- William Colfax (1756–1838), soldier and settler
- Frances Manwaring Caulkins (1795–1869), historian, genealogist, author
- Thomas Humphrey Cushing (1755–1822), brigadier general in the War of 1812 and collector of customs
- John M. K. Davis (1844–1920), U.S. Army brigadier general; lived in New London during his retirement
- Harry Daghlian (1921–1945), physicist at Los Alamos National Lab, first person to die as a result of a criticality accident
- Brian Dayett, New York Yankees/Chicago Cubs Major League Baseball player
- A. J. Dillon (born 1998), American football running back
- David Dorfman (born 1955), choreographer
- Richard Douglass (1746–1828), cooper and soldier
- Grace L. Drake, Ohio state legislator
- Doug DuBose (born 1964), NFL player
- Kris Dunn (born 1994), point guard for the Los Angeles Clippers
- Larry Elgart (1922–2017), musician
- John Ellis (born 1948), baseball player
- Elsie Ferguson (1883–1961), stage and film actress
- Richard P. Freeman (1869–1944), congressman
- William Goddard (publisher) (1740–1817), Co-founded US Post Office with Benjamin Franklin
- L. Patrick Gray (1916–2005), lawyer and Watergate figure
- Nathan Hale (1755–1776), schoolmaster and patriot
- Doc Hammer (born 1967), multimedium artist and co-creator of the Venture Brothers
- Matt Harvey (born 1989), MLB pitcher for the Cincinnati Reds
- Richard "Skip" Arthur Hayward (born 1947), first tribal chairman of the Mashantucket Pequot Indian Tribe
- Glenne Headly (1955–2017), actress
- Barkley L. Hendricks (born 1945), painter
- Jedediah Huntington (1743–1818), Revolutionary War General and New London Customs Collector
- Linda Jaivin (born 1955), Australian author
- Sarah Kemble Knight (1666–1727), diarist, teacher and businesswoman
- Madeline Kripke (1943–2020), book collector
- John Law (1796–1873), congressman
- Bryan F. Mahan (1856–1923), congressman
- Richard Mansfield (1857–1907), actor
- Gaten Matarazzo (born 2002), actor
- John McCain (1936–2018), senator and Republican presidential nominee (lived in New London as a child when his father, John S. McCain, Jr., worked at the naval submarine base)
- Lansing McVickar (1895–1945), career officer with the United States Army
- Thomas Minor (1608–1690), founder and early New England diarist
- Casey Neistat (born 1981), filmmaker
- James R Newby (born 1844), was a Civil War veteran who served in the first regiment of volunteer African Americans in the United States and a 19th-century African-American missionary to present-day Nigeria, Cameroon, and Liberia
- Hannah Ocuish (1774–1786), believed to be the youngest person executed in the United States
- James O'Neill (1847–1920), actor, father of Eugene O'Neill
- Eugene O'Neill (1888–1953), playwright
- Walter Palmer (1585–1661), founder
- Elias Perkins (1767–1845), congressman
- Mary Philips (1901–1975), actress
- Edward Clark Potter (1857–1923), sculptor
- Ellen Culver Potter (1871–1958), physician, public health official
- Mildred Towne Powell (1886–1977), politician
- Renee Prahar (1879–1962), sculptor
- Art Quimby (1933–2010), basketball player
- Jordan Reed (born 1990), tight end for the Washington Redskins
- Tim Riordan (born 1960), gridiron football player
- Dawn Robinson (born 1965), singer
- Dudley Saltonstall (1738–1796), naval officer
- "Magic Dick" Salwitz (born 1945), musician
- Thomas R. Sargent III (1914–2010), Vice Admiral in the United States Coast Guard
- C. John Satti (1895–1968), Secretary of the State of Connecticut
- Samuel Seabury (1729–1796), bishop
- Signe Margaret Stuart (b. 1937), artist
- Benjamin Stark (1820–1898), senator
- Sigmund Strochlitz (1916–2006), activist and Holocaust survivor
- Dana Suesse (1909–1987), composer, songwriter, musician
- Ron Suresha (born 1958), author and editor
- Flora M. Vare, (1874–1962), Pennsylvania State Senator from 1925 to 1928
- Cassie Ventura (born 1986), singer
- John T. Wait (1811–1899), former U.S. Representative for Connecticut
- Thomas M. Waller (1839–1924), Mayor of New London and 51st Governor of Connecticut
- John A. Tibbits (1844–1893), founder of The Day and Speaker of the Connecticut House of Representatives
- Mary Way (1769–1833), portrait miniaturist
- John Winthrop the Younger (1606–1676), statesman and founder
- Tyson Wheeler (born 1975), former Denver Nuggets basketball player
- Abisha Woodward (1752–1809), early American lighthouse builder

== Mayors of New London ==
Notable mayors include:

- Richard Law (1784–1806)
- Elias Perkins (1829–1832)
- Noyes Billings (1835–1837)
- John Perkins Cushing Mather (1845–1850)
- Hiram Willey (1862–1865)
- Augustus Brandegee (1871–1873)
- Thomas M. Waller (1873–1879)
- Bryan F. Mahan (1903–1909, 1909–1915)
- Ernest E. Rogers (1915–1918)
