= Mary Xavier Mehegan =

Irish-American Catholic nun

Mother Mary Xavier Mehegan, S.C.

Mary Xavier Mehegan, S.C. (born Catharine Mehegan; 1825) was an Irish-American Catholic sister who founded the Sisters of Charity of Saint Elizabeth and opened New Jersey's first four-year college for women, what is now Saint Elizabeth University.

== Early life ==
She was born Catharine Mehegan in Ireland in 1825, one of the ten children of Patrick Mehegan and Joanna Miles. Along with a sister, Margaret, she emigrated to the United States in 1842, settling in New York City. In 1846 she joined the Sisters of Charity there, who had been founded by Mother (now Saint) Elizabeth Ann Bayley Seton in Maryland. A native of New York, in 1817 Seton sent sisters from the motherhouse in Emmitsburg, Maryland, to her native city. Taking the name by which she is now known, Catharine Mehegan joined the Sisters of Charity of New York and took her annual religious vows for the first time on 25 March 1847.

In 1853 James Roosevelt Bayley became the first Bishop of Newark, with the Pro-Cathedral of St. Patrick serving as its seat. The step-nephew of Mother Seton, he sought a congregation of women religious to care for orphaned children and to operate parochial schools in the Diocese of Newark. Neither the Sisters of Charity in Emmitsburg, MD nor any of its offshoots was able to provide sisters for his diocese. He found five young women who wished to become Sisters of Charity and sent them to the Sisters of Charity of Cincinnati for a year of formation. Upon their return, the Sisters of Charity of New York agreed to help establish an order of Sisters of Charity in New Jersey, with the understanding that in a few years each Sister of Charity of New York would be free either to remain in New Jersey or to return to New York. Fortunately, Sister Mary Xavier Mehegan and Sister Mary Catharine Nevin cast their lot with the new congregation in New Jersey.

== New Jersey ==
In 1858 Bishop Bayley requested of their superiors in Emmitsburg that the Sisters in New Jersey be established as an independent congregation, with Mehegan as Mother Superior. She and Sister Mary Catharine, along with five recruits for the new religious institute, took their vows on that 19 July, at that time the feast day of St. Vincent de Paul, whose Rule of Life they followed. This feast was to become the traditional day for the annual renewal of their vows held by the Sisters. Approval of the new institute was received on 29 September 1859 and Mehegan was formally appointed the first Mother Superior of the new congregation, to be known as the Sisters of Charity of Saint Elizabeth (in honor of the bishop's aunt and their foundress). Mehegan was to serve in this office until her death in 1915. At the time, they kept the religious habit and Constitutions of the Sisters in New York. Later in 1880, at the request of the bishop, they replaced the black widow's cap of Mother Seton with a black veil. In less than a year the first Catholic hospital in New Jersey was opened at St. Mary's, Newark.

On 2 July 1860, the motherhouse was removed to the old Chegaray mansion at Madison, which had recently been vacated by Seton Hall College. The Academy of Saint Elizabeth was opened the same year. During the Civil War Sisters of Charity cared for soldiers on both sides in emergency hospitals set up at the train stations in Newark and Trenton.

Mother Xavier served as Mother General for 56 years. Under her leadership, the Sisters opened parish schools, academies, hospitals, a day nursery, orphanages, a home for the incurably ill, and a residence for working women.

In 1899 Mehegan founded the College of Saint Elizabeth (renamed in 2020 as Saint Elizabeth University), which was the first four-year women's college in New Jersey. This was among the first women's colleges in the nation. Her Sisters moved beyond New Jersey to serve in Connecticut, Massachusetts and New York State by the time of her death on 24 June 1915.

== See also ==
- Academy of St. Elizabeth
