= Dan Clark (disambiguation) =

Dan Clark (born 1976) is an English actor, stand-up comedian, scriptwriter and television director.

Dan Clark may also refer to:

- Dan Clark (ice hockey) (born 1957), Canadian hockey player
- Dan Clark (motivational speaker) (born 1955), American author, CEO, and motivational teacher
- Dan Clark (Canadian football) (born 1988), Canadian football offensive lineman

== See also ==
- Dan Clarke (born 1983), British auto racing driver
- Daniel Clark (disambiguation)
- Danny Clark (disambiguation)
