= Jason Hewlett =

American actor (born 1978)

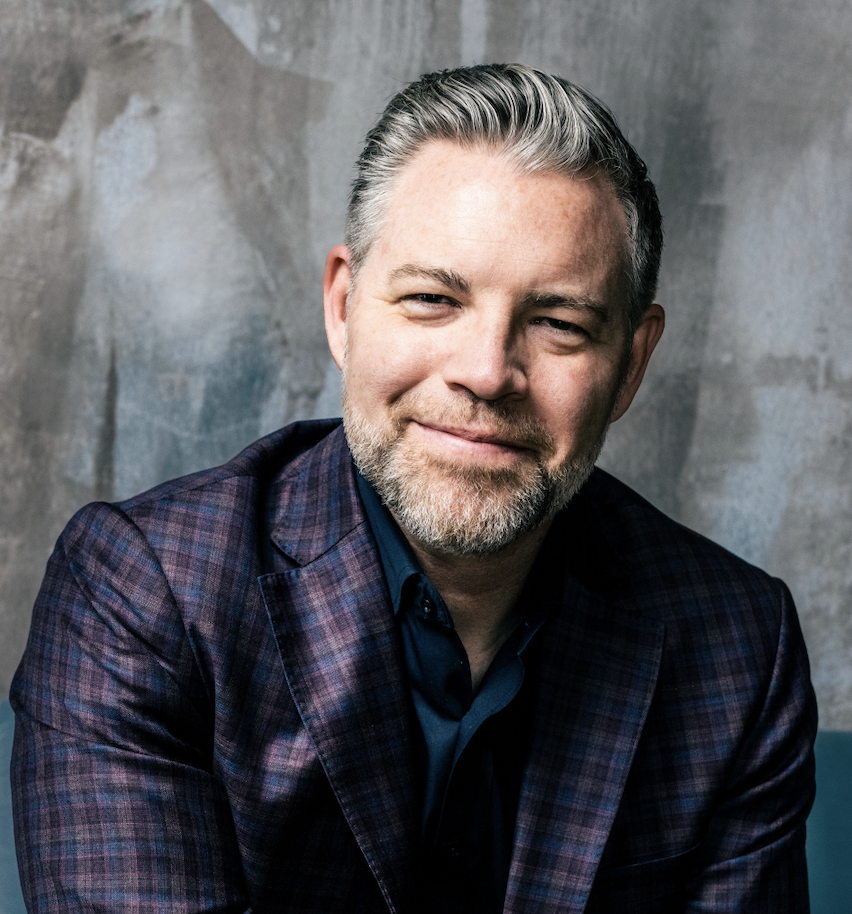
- Born: 1978 (age 47–48); Salt Lake City, Utah
- Occupations: Speaker, entertainer, author, impressionist, and corporate events headliner
- Notable work: The Promise To The One.
- Spouse: Tami Spenst Hewlett
- Children: Ella Rae Hewlett Jason "Redford" Hewlett II Royal Hewlett Romney Hewlett
- Parent(s): John and Marsha Hewlett
- Website: jasonhewlett.com

Jason Hewlett (born 1978) is an American speaker, entertainer, author, impressionist, and corporate headliner.

== Personal life ==
Jason Hewlett was born in Salt Lake City, Utah, in 1978 to John and Marsha Hewlett. Hewlett's mother, formerly Marsha Redford, is a cousin of actor Robert Redford. He is married to Tami Spenst Hewlett and has 4 children.

Jason Hewlett attended The Waterford School, where his singing talent was first discovered by a teacher who heard him out in the school hallway. Singing since he was young, Hewlett started the Troubadours, a renowned choir program at Waterford. In addition, Hewlett served as the 1997 student body president.

Hewlett's Great Grandfather, Lester Franklin Hewlett, was President of the Mormon Tabernacle Choir from 1938 to 1962, during which time the choir won a Grammy in 1959 for its recording of “The Battle Hymn of The Republic” in the vocal group/chorus category, of which Hewlett's Great-Grandmother, Margaret Stewart Hewlett was a choir member.

== Career ==
Hewlett began his professional career after his post-high school service as a Mormon missionary in the Florianópolis, Brazil Mission, which ended in 1999. One of his early gigs was as a half-time entertainer for University of Utah & Brigham Young University basketball games. In 2001, he began working with the Las Vegas-based Legends in Concert as both a Ricky Martin and Elton John impersonator.

In 2002, he left Legends and worked professionally, and became a corporate events headliner. Devin Thorpe of Forbes said: "He’s become one of the most sought after corporate entertainers in the business because his fall-off-your-chair funny material is absolutely safe for work."

In 2004, Hewlett was courted by multiple Las Vegas casinos to manage and create his one-man show. Based on creative differences and demands that he change his act from family-appropriate to more adult, he turned down all offers and continued performing at corporate events and speaking to youth in school assemblies.

In 2011, Hewlett announced his retirement from public events and now performs and speaks solely for corporate and youth events, occasionally allowing his draw to be used for charitable causes and fundraisers, although he performs privately for numerous charities on a regular basis.

In 2014, Hewlett performed his one-man show for the National Speakers Association Foundation Event. The same year he was invited to perform a US Military Tour throughout the Middle East and Southwest Asia on US Military stations and bases in Kuwait, Bahrain, Djibouti, Addis-Ababa, and Afghanistan during wartime for Armed Forces Entertainment along with other Latter Day Saints Artists including David Archuleta, Dan Clark, and Dean Kaelin.

In 2016, Hewlett was invited by the National Speakers Association to be the Keynote Speaker for the national Influence conference for his peers. At this same event, he was inducted into the Speaker Hall of Fame as one of the youngest recipients to be named a CPAE (Council of Peers Award of Excellence).

In 2023, Hewlett spoke in front of hundreds of aspiring young medical professionals at the HOSA State Leadership Conference, inspiring students to find their “signature moves”, as they continue to embark in their future health professions.

As of Augist 2024, Hewlett's career primarily consists of keynote speeches, where he uses storytelling and comedy to inspire audiences around the world. He has performed over 2,000 of these presentations for Fortune 500 companies.

In September 2024, Hewlett's father leveraged his position as an event sponsor to get Hewlett a spot as the opening entertainer on Tucker Carlson's Tour Across America stop in Utah. Hewlett was then invited to complete the tour. Hewlett opened fourteen shows, sharing the stage with Glenn Beck, Kid Rock, Robert F. Kennedy Jr., then-Senator JD Vance, Donald Trump Jr., and President Donald Trump. Hewlett reported that he found himself agreeing with much of what he was hearing on the tour. He later reported that he lost all of his corporate opportunities and events for 2025 due to these actions. In his blog, Hewlett states that, "With President Donald J. Trump as our Leader, as chosen by the popular vote and electoral process, the golden age of our country will return."

=== Acting ===
In 1997 Hewlett played the lead role in "Crayoluv", a short film by director Tucker Dansie.

=== Religious ===
Hewlett is a member of The Church of Jesus Christ of Latter-day Saints, also referred to as Mormons. He references his religion in his speaking and performing as a comedy routine in order to make everyone feel connected rather than segregated.

=== Author ===
He published Signature Moves: How To Stand Out in a Sit Down World in 2014 by Peak Bagger Publishing. His book The Promise To The One was published by Sound Wisdom. The eBook launched May 13, 2020 as the #1 Hot Release in the category of Spiritual Self-Help on Amazon. Paperback and Audiobook versions of the book launched on August 7, 2020.

=== Musician ===
He published the album, “Good To Me,” and the song, “My 8-ft. Tall Doll (The Chewbacca Song).”

== Controversies and viral post ==
On December 1, 2015, Hewlett's Facebook post about seeing his wife at retail store Target became a viral internet post the world over, as it got headlined in news outlets and media as, “Man Cheats on Wife - Breaks The Internet". Within 24 hours of posting, it was featured on the Today Show web site, within 48 hours it had been highlighted as the top story on BusinessInsider, GoogleAds, Yahoo!, and in People magazine. Within 72 hours the Hewlett couple's story was appearing on news outlets from Italy to Singapore and Australia, among others, as well as the family received multiple Reality TV Show offers from Hollywood producers (all of which were turned away), and Hewlett's name was trending higher than Kim Kardashian as the top trending name in the world. As favorable as the attention was at first, Hewlett was also accused of creating “click-bait” with his post, and received multiple negative reviews of his writing, specifically from Cosmopolitan, The TV show The View, and multiple popular bloggers. His post was shared by celebrities such as George Takei, Zooey Deschanel, and boxer Manny Pacquiao. The original post on his Facebook Page has reached over 35 million views and more than 238,000 shares and on his personal profile over 82,000 shares.

== Awards and recognition ==
- Best Specialty Act or Variety Performance in the Arts & Entertainment Category, Best of State Awards - Utah (2010).
- Best Individual Vocalist in the Arts & Entertainment Category, Best of State Awards - Utah (2013).
- Certified Speaking Profession (CSP) designation by the National Speakers Association (less than 5% of speakers receive) (2014).
- Outstanding Eagle Scout Award from the National Eagle Scout Association (only 1250 have been awarded since its introduction in 2011 through 2015).
- The STAR Award from the SCERA Center for the Arts in Orem, Utah (lifetime achievement award - 2016).
- Speaker Hall of Fame aka CPAE (Council of Peers Award for Excellence) induction from the National Speakers Association (less than 1% of speakers) (2016).
- The Promise to the One was #1 on Amazon on the day of its release
