= Mildred Allen =

Mildred Allen may refer to:

- Mildred Allen (physicist) (1894–1990), American physicist
- Mildred Allen (soprano) (1932–2021), American operatic soprano
- Mildred P. Allen (1908–1961), American politician in Connecticut
