= Daniel Clark =

Daniel Clark may refer to:

- Daniel Clark (actor) (born 1985), American actor
- Daniel Clark (basketball) (born 1988), British basketball player
- Daniel Clark (Connecticut colonial leader) (1622–1710)
- Daniel Clark Sr. (1732–1800), American merchant and slave trader
- Daniel Clark (New Hampshire politician) (1809–1891), U.S. senator
- Daniel Clark (Louisiana politician) (c. 1766–1813), first Delegate from Orleans Territory to the United States House of Representatives
- Daniel F. Clark (1954–2014), Pennsylvania politician
- Daniel Kinnear Clark (1822–1896), British railway engineer
- Daniel B. Clark (1890–1961), American cinematographer
- Daniel Clark, shoemaker (d.1744) murder victim in Britain, victim of Eugene Aram

== See also ==
- Dan Clark (disambiguation)
- Danny Clark (disambiguation)
- Dan Clarke (born 1983), British autoracer
