= Alice Leopold =

American politician, social activist and government official (1906–1982)

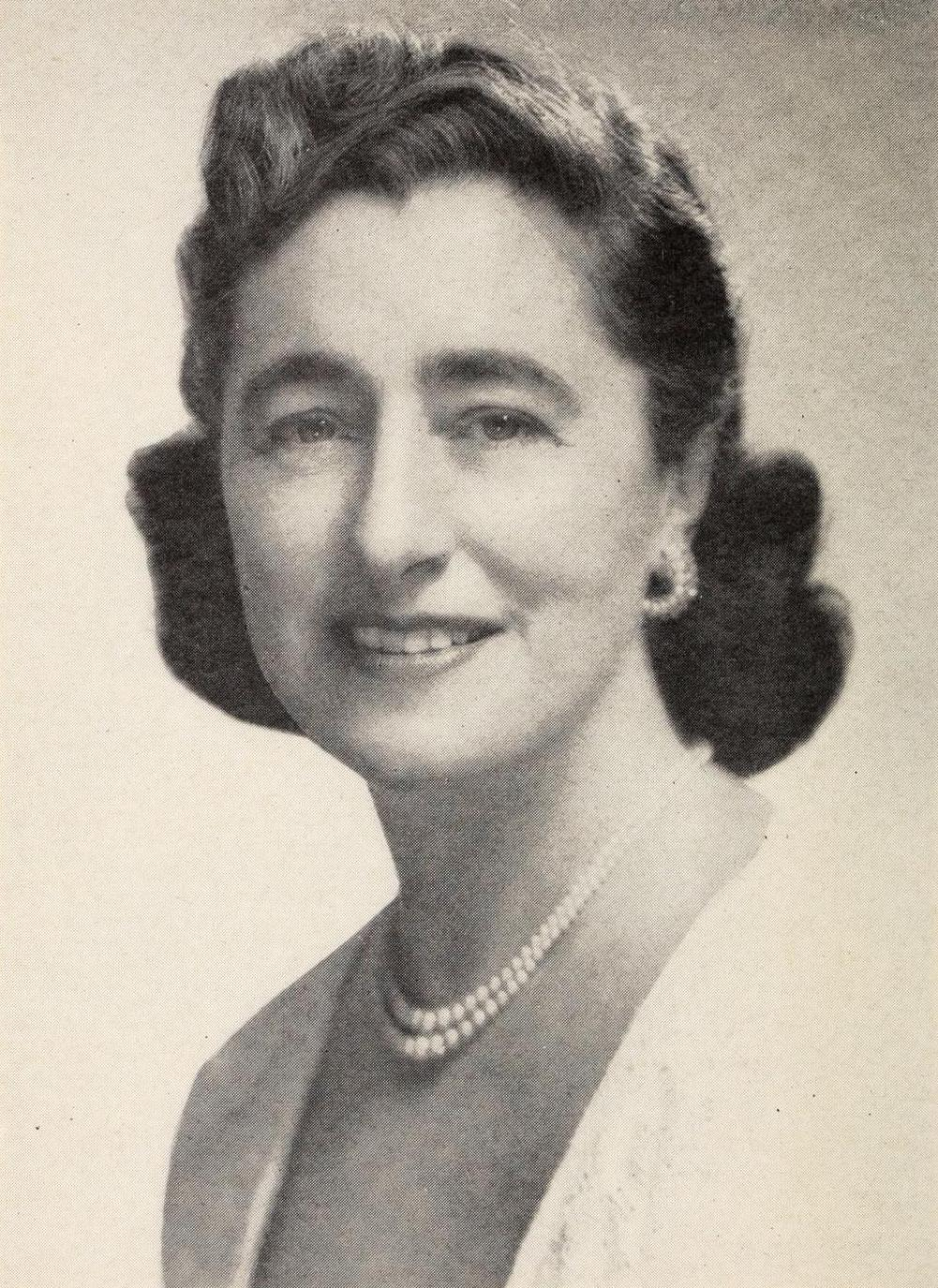
- Leopold in 1951

3rd Director of the United States Women's Bureau
- In office 1953–1961
- President: Dwight Eisenhower
- Preceded by: Frieda S. Miller
- Succeeded by: Esther Peterson

61st Secretary of the State of Connecticut
- In office 1951–1953
- Governor: John Davis Lodge
- Preceded by: Winifred McDonald
- Succeeded by: Charles B. Keats

Personal details
- Born: Alice Koller Leopold; May 9, 1906 Scranton, Pennsylvania, US
- Died: March 23, 1982 (aged 75) Alexandria, Virginia, US
- Party: Republican

Alice Koller Leopold (May 9, 1906 – March 23, 1982) was an American politician, social activist, and government official. She served as Secretary of the State of Connecticut from 1951 to 1953 and as Director of the United States Women's Bureau from 1953 to 1961.

== Early life and business career ==
Alice Koller was the daughter of E. Leonard Koller (1872-1953) and Leonora Edwards Koller (1881-1942). Born in Scranton, Pennsylvania, she graduated from Goucher College in Towson, Maryland in 1927 having double-majored in English and economics. After a training course, she became an assistant buyer for Hutzler's, a major Baltimore department store. She soon advanced to being personnel director, first for the female employees and then for all employees. She was later personnel director for B. Altman and Company, a New York City department store.

In 1931, Koller married New York advertising executive Joseph Leopold and became a homemaker, raising the couple's two children, Robert (1934-2004) and John. While raising her sons she started a successful toy company based on designs she had made herself for places to park toy vehicles.

== Political career ==
While her sons were in the Weston, Connecticut public schools, Alice Leopold organized a hot lunch program for the students and became the president of the local Parent Teacher Association. She also worked with the League of Women Voters. In 1949, Leopold was elected as a Republican to the Connecticut House of Representatives from Weston. She introduced a minimum wage law which passed in the next session and an equal pay law which was passed in that session. In 1950, she was elected Secretary of State. In 1953, her office produced a general revision of election laws which successfully passed the legislature.

In November 1953, Leopold resigned to be director of the United States Women's Bureau, first as a recess appointment by President Dwight D. Eisenhower and then confirmed by the Senate in January 1954. Eisenhower probably replaced the previous director, Frieda S. Miller, in an effort to mute Women's Bureau opposition to the Equal Rights Amendment. Leopold focused the Bureau more on the problems of professional women and on women re-entering the workforce after raising children, as she had herself. In 1954, she was given the additional title of Assistant to the Secretary of Labor for Women's Affairs. In 1956, she persuaded Eisenhower to add a call for equal pay to his State of the Union address, and the call was repeated for the remainder of Eisenhower's administration.

In 1958, Leopold was given an honorary Doctor of Laws by Rutgers University. She received Rockford College's Jane Addams Medal in 1960, an award given to women who, like Addams, "are pioneers in their professions, outstanding in character, and recognized for their contributions to the arts, sciences, and society".

During the Nixon administration, Leopold served on a Health Services Industry Committee which was intended to develop measures to reduce inflation in the health care industry. She is listed as living in San Francisco, California, at the time.

== Burial ==
Leopold died on March 23, 1982, at Alexandria Hospital in Alexandria, Virginia. Leopold is buried in the Chestnut Hill Cemetery in Glen Rock, Pennsylvania with her parents. Some of her papers are in the Schlesinger Library at Harvard University.

Political offices
Preceded by Winifred McDonald	Secretary of the State of Connecticut; 1951–1953	Succeeded by Charles B. Keats
