= Institute of Women's Professional Relations =

The Institute of Women's Professional Relations was a center that aimed to collect and disperse a wide array of information about employment opportunities for women in professional fields.

Within professional careers, women lost some of the advances that had been made before the Great Depression. During the Great Depression, women found fewer job positions in business than in the 1920s. Women were entering the workforce at this time, but were paid significantly lower wages than men, and worked in mainly clerical, domestic, or factory sectors. Its purpose was to provide accurate and accessible information and make people consider the political and social role that women play in the workforce and in their education, by providing conferences and publications.

The institute was originally located at North Carolina College for Women in Greensboro, North Carolina. In 1934, the center was moved to Connecticut College. Chase Woodhouse was the director of the institute and helped relocate it to Connecticut, working closely with the president of the college at the time, Katherine Blunt, to relocate the institute.

The move to Connecticut College was seen to be advantageous for the institute because of the proximity to New York City which has libraries with a plethora of resources as well as being close to the New York service bureau. Within the first year of moving the institute to Connecticut College, the Institute made many accomplishments. There was a wide distribution of work information and resources through offices and lectures, talks were given by the director at six professional societies, seven universities, and three outside organizations, as well as newspaper releases, publications in eight books and magazines.

Although there was some money being brought into the institute, it was severely underfunded, and so the possibility for the institute to meet its demands were very limited due to the financial situation.

Each year between 1935 and 1944, the institute held conferences on various topics. Some were more general, focusing on a wide range of topic, but some were more specific such as public service, chemistry, photography, post-war demands, etc. These conferences brought together representatives of colleges and universities, businesses and governments to discuss common barriers that women faced, while attempting to meet the occupations that met both economic and social needs for satisfying work.

== Organization of the Institute ==
- Director - Mrs. Chase Going Woodhouse
- Chairman of the Board- Mrs. Catherine Filene Shouse

== Conferences ==
- Consumer Relations: The Work of the Home Economist in Business (n.d.)
- Career Conference Program (1935)
- Conference on Opportunities in Public Service (1939)
- Conference on Photography- Profession, Adjunct, Recreation (1940)
- Conference on Work Opportunities in the Field of American Fashion Design (1941)
- Conference on War Demands for Trained Personnel (1942)
- Conference on War and Post-War Demands for Trained Personnel (1943)
- Conference on War and Post-War Employment and Its Demands for Educational Adjustments (1944)
