= Thomas R. Ball =

American politician (1896–1943)

Thomas Raymond Ball

Member of the U.S. House of Representatives from Connecticut's 2nd district
- In office January 3, 1939 – January 3, 1941
- Preceded by: William J. Fitzgerald
- Succeeded by: William J. Fitzgerald

Personal details
- Born: February 12, 1896 New York City, U.S.
- Died: June 16, 1943 (aged 47) Old Lyme, Connecticut, U.S.
- Resting place: Duck River Cemetery, Old Lyme, Connecticut, U.S.
- Party: Republican

Military service
- Allegiance: United States
- Branch/service: United States Army
- Unit: 7th New York Infantry; Fortieth United States Engineers
- Battles/wars: World War I

Thomas Raymond Ball (February 12, 1896 – June 16, 1943) was a U.S. representative from Connecticut.

== Early life ==
Born in New York City, Ball attended the public schools, Anglo-Saxon School in Paris, France, Heathcote School in Harrison, New York, and the Art Students League in New York City. He engaged as a designer in 1916.

== World War I ==
During the First World War, he served in the Depot Battalion, Seventh New York Infantry (in 1917) and overseas with the Camouflage Section, Fortieth United States Engineers (from 1918 to 1919). After the war, he relocated to Old Lyme, Connecticut, and engaged in architectural pursuits.

== Political career ==
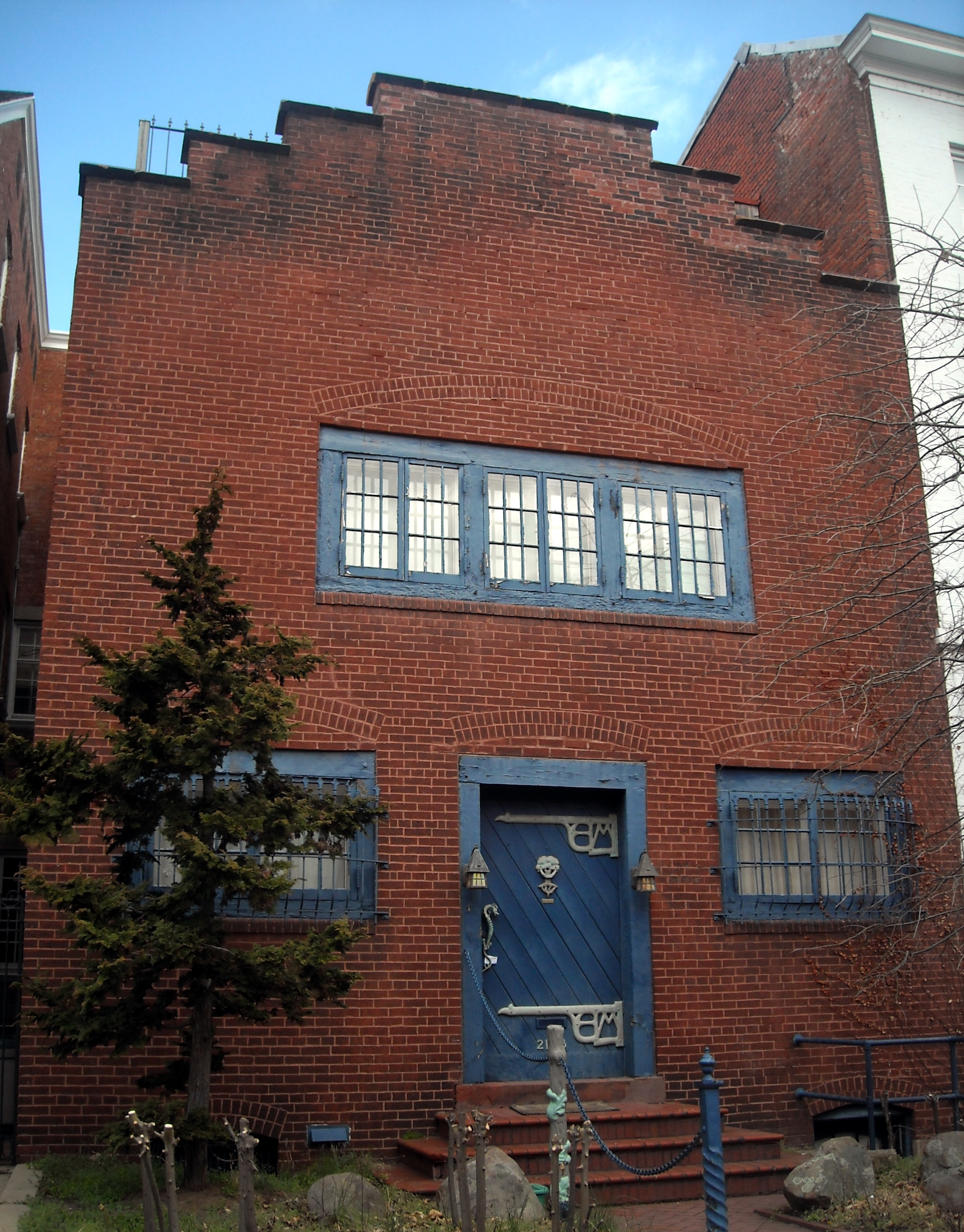
Ball's former residence in Washington, D.C.

Ball served as member of the board of education, and as served as selectman of Old Lyme, Connecticut, from 1926 to 1938. He also served in the State house of representatives from 1927 to 1937.

Ball was elected as a Republican to the Seventy-sixth Congress (January 3, 1939 – January 3, 1941). He was an unsuccessful candidate for reelection in 1940 to the Seventy-seventh Congress, after which he resumed his former pursuits at Old Lyme.

== Death ==
Ball died in Old Lyme on June 16, 1943.

U.S. House of Representatives
Preceded by William J. Fitzgerald	Member of the U.S. House of Representatives from Connecticut's 2nd congressional district 1939–1941	Succeeded by William J. Fitzgerald
