= Winifred McDonald =

American politician

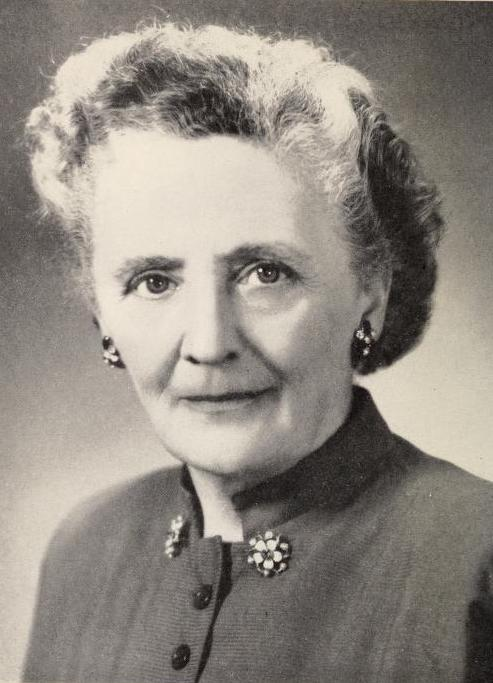

Secretary of the State of Connecticut
- In office January 5, 1949 – 1951
- Governor: Chester Bowles
- Preceded by: Frances B. Redick
- Succeeded by: Alice Leopold

Personal details
- Born: Winifred Weis; June 8, 1888 Waterbury, Connecticut, US
- Died: February 23, 1976 (aged 87) Waterbury, Connecticut
- Party: Democratic
- Education: Saint Elizabeth University (BA)
- Occupation: Politician, teacher

Winifred Genevieve McDonald (June 8, 1888 – February 23, 1976) was an American politician and teacher who served as Secretary of the State of Connecticut from 1949 to 1951. A Democrat from Waterbury, she ousted Republican incumbent Frances B. Redick in 1948. McDonald narrowly lost her reelection bid to Republican nominee Alice Leopold in 1950.

== Early life and education ==
McDonald was born Winifred Weis to parents Charles X. and Mary (McGuiness) Weis on June 8, 1888. She and her parents were all born in Waterbury, Connecticut. She attended parochial schools before earning her Bachelor of Arts degree summa cum laude from Saint Elizabeth University in 1910. She taught English at Ansonia High School and Crosby High School.

== Political career ==
In 1940, McDonald began serving as a member of the Democratic State Central Committee from the 15th Senate District, as well as a member of the Democratic Town Committee of Waterbury—the first time women were allowed on the committee. She became vice chair of the town committee in 1947 and chair in 1954 and again in 1960, the year she retired from politics.

A charter member of the Waterbury Women's Democratic Club, she served as president of the New Haven County Democratic Federated Women's Club, chair of the Waterbury and New Haven County Council of Catholic Women, and president of the Saint Elizabeth College Alumna Association. She was active in child welfare and social services. McDonald was one of the first women in the state to serve on a grand jury and was the first woman from Waterbury to run for state office.

In her first bid for elected office in 1948, McDonald ran for Secretary of the State of Connecticut. She defeated Republican incumbent Frances Burke Redick by only 500 votes out of more than 860,000 cast. In 1949, she urged local officials to extend voting hours to allow Jewish voters to get to the polls after sunset, when Yom Kippur observance concluded.

McDonald narrowly lost her reelection bid in 1950 to Republican nominee Alice Leopold, losing by 400 votes.

== Personal life ==
In 1912, she married Waterbury lawyer Edward J. McDonald. They had two sons, Edward Jr. and Robert J. McDonald.

McDonald died at Waterbury Hospital on February 23, 1976, at the age of 87. She was interred at the New Saint Joseph's Cemetery in Waterbury.

Political offices
| Preceded by Frances B. Redick | Secretary of State of Connecticut; 1949–1951 | Succeeded by Alice Leopold |
