= Chase G. Woodhouse =

American educator and politician (1890–1984)

Chase Woodhouse
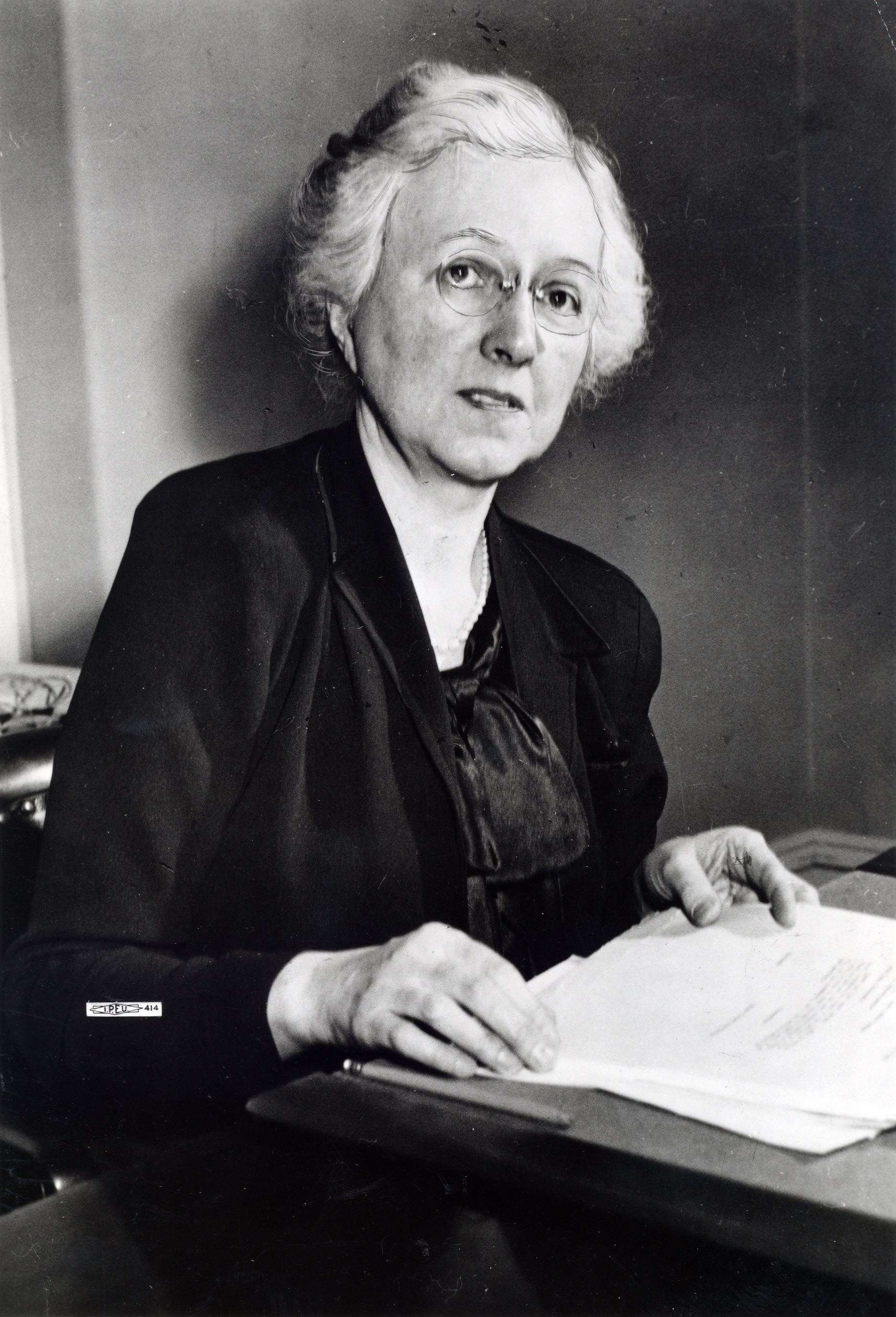

Secretary of the House Democratic Caucus
- In office January 3, 1949 – January 3, 1951
- Leader: John McCormack
- Preceded by: Position established
- Succeeded by: Edna Kelly

Member of the U.S. House of Representatives from Connecticut's 2nd district
- In office January 3, 1949 – January 3, 1951
- Preceded by: Horace Seely-Brown
- Succeeded by: Horace Seely-Brown
- In office January 3, 1945 – January 3, 1947
- Preceded by: John McWilliams
- Succeeded by: Horace Seely-Brown

Secretary of the State of Connecticut
- In office January 8, 1941 – January 6, 1943
- Governor: Robert Hurley
- Preceded by: Sara Crawford
- Succeeded by: Frances Burke Redick

Personal details
- Born: Chase Going; March 3, 1890 Victoria, British Columbia, Canada
- Died: December 12, 1984 (aged 94) New Canaan, Connecticut, U.S.
- Party: Democratic
- Spouse: Edward Woodhouse
- Children: 2
- Education: McGill University (BA, MA); University of Berlin (attended); University of Chicago (attended)

Chase Going Woodhouse (March 3, 1890 – December 12, 1984) was an American politician, feminist, suffragist and educator. She served as a member of the United States House of Representatives representing the second congressional district of Connecticut, becoming the second congresswoman from Connecticut, the first elected as a Democrat, and the first woman born outside the United States in either chamber of the U.S. Congress.

== Early life and education ==
Woodhouse was born to American parents in Victoria, British Columbia, Canada. She attended Science Hill School in Shelbyville, Kentucky, and finished in 1908. She went to study at McGill University, earning a Bachelor of Arts degree with honors in 1912 and a Masters of Arts degree with Honors in 1914, both in Economics. She then studied at the University of Berlin and the University of Chicago. After graduating from McGill University, she began her career as a college professor and spent part of it as a well-known political figure in the women's suffrage movement and later in the Democratic Party of the State of Connecticut. While serving as a fellow in political economics at the University of Chicago, Chase Going met and eventually married a professor of government there, Edward Woodhouse. They had two children, Noel and Margaret.

== Political career ==
In her early professional career, she was a senior economist at the Bureau of Home Economics, United States Department of Agriculture, from 1926 to 1928. Shortly after moving to New London, Connecticut in 1934, Woodhouse registered to vote as a Democrat. In 1940, she was the first Democratic woman to be elected as Secretary of State for Connecticut, serving one term. She also served as chair of the New London, Democratic Town Committee in 1942 and 1943. During World War II Woodhouse was a consultant for the National Roster of Scientific and Specialized Personnel, War Manpower Commission, from 1942 to 1944. As a feminist leader, she became president of the Connecticut Federation of Democratic Women's Clubs, which is the oldest federation of Democratic Women's Clubs in the nation, from 1943 to 1948.

While teaching economics at Connecticut College, Woodhouse began her electoral campaign for the United States Congress. She was elected as a Democrat to the Seventy-Ninth Congress and served from January 3, 1945, to January 3, 1947. She defeated Republican John D. McWilliams from Norwich, with a plurality of 3,046 compared to McWilliams' plurality of 2,492. In this election many cities in Eastern Connecticut, like Norwich and New London, voted Democratic for Woodhouse, while smaller towns voted Republican. While in office, she was a political activist for women's advancement in careers beyond education, focusing on combining motherhood and feminism. Woodhouse introduced the bill, "H.R. 1584", to the subcommittee of the House Committee on Education and Labor, which identified unequal labor practices and wages between men and women. She ran for reelection to the Eightieth Congress in November 1946 but was defeated by Republican Horace Seely-Brown Jr. While out of office, she resumed her women's advocacies. She became executive director of the Women's Division of the Democratic National Committee (DNC), based in Washington, D.C., in 1947 and 1948. Democrats, like President Harry Truman believed Woodhouse was a valuable link to women voters and encouraged this appointment. Woodhouse then successfully ran again for Congress, defeating Seely-Brown, and served in the Eighty-First Congress from January 3, 1949, to January 3, 1951. She was also a visiting expert on the staff of General Lucius D. Clay, Allied Military Governor of Germany, in 1948. She was defeated for reelection to the Eighty-Second Congress by Seely-Brown in the November 1950 elections.

Woodhouse was appointed to the Banking and Currency Committee while serving in Congress. She was special consultant to the Director of Price Stabilization, from 1951 to 1953. Woodhouse began serving as the director of the Auerbach Service Bureau for Connecticut Organizations in Hartford in 1954. She was also a member of the Permanent Commission on the Status of Women and served on the Connecticut Humanities Council. She served as a delegate to the Connecticut State Constitutional Convention in 1965. In 1967, she was chairman of the Governor's Committee on the Status of Women. She then served as a member of the Advisory Committee to the State Department of Community Affairs from 1967 until 1972. Woodhouse was also a member of Comprehensive Health Planning Council, the Steering Committee of the Connecticut Mental Health Planning Project, the Advisory Council to the Board of Mental Health, and the State Commission of Housing and New Communities.

As a staunch feminist, Woodhouse regularly contributed to Planned Parenthood and was an early proponent of environmental legislation. She earned the prestigious Ella T. Grasso Award for Outstanding Service at the end of her professional career.

== Career in education ==
Woodhouse served on the economics faculty of Smith College, Northampton, Massachusetts, from 1918 to 1925. She was on the faculty of Connecticut College, New London, Connecticut, from 1934 to 1946. She was managing director of the Institute of Women's Professional Relations at Connecticut College from 1929 until 1946, which she helped found before moving to Connecticut. She also served as the personnel director of the Woman's College, University of North Carolina at Greensboro, the equivalent of dean of women in other colleges, from 1929 through 1934.

== Writings ==
Woodhouse co-wrote three books and numerous articles. As an early feminist, most of her work centered around women's education, equal opportunity and their professional lives. The books she cowrote are Occupations for College Women in 1929, After College- What? in 1933, and Dentistry as an Occupation in 1934. Some of the articles she wrote were included in the American Journal of Sociology. A few of her most famous articles are "The Status of Women", published in the American Journal of Sociology in 1931 and "A Study of 250 Successful Families", published in Social Forces in 1930.

== Death ==
Woodhouse died on December 12, 1984, at age 94 years and 284 days, in New Canaan, Connecticut. She was cremated, and the location of her ashes is unknown.

== See also ==
- Women in the United States House of Representatives

Political offices
| Preceded by Sara Crawford | Secretary of the State of Connecticut; 1941–1943 | Succeeded by Frances Redick |
U.S. House of Representatives
| Preceded by John McWilliams | Member of the U.S. House of Representatives from Connecticut's 3rd congressional district 1945–1947 | Succeeded by Horace Seely-Brown |
| Preceded by Horace Seely-Brown | Member of the U.S. House of Representatives from Connecticut's 1st congressional district 1949–1951 | Succeeded by Horace Seely-Brown |
Party political offices
| New office | Secretary of the House Democratic Caucus; 1949–1951 | Succeeded by Edna Kelly |
