= William J. Fitzgerald =

American politician (1887–1947)

William Fitzgerald

Member of the U.S. House of Representatives from Connecticut's 2nd district
- In office January 3, 1941 – January 3, 1943; January 3, 1937 – January 3, 1939
- Preceded by: Thomas R. Ball; William L. Higgins
- Succeeded by: Thomas R. Ball; John D. McWilliams

Personal details
- Born: March 2, 1887 Norwich, Connecticut, U.S.
- Died: May 6, 1947 (aged 60) Norwich, Connecticut, U.S
- Party: Democratic

William Joseph Fitzgerald (March 2, 1887 – May 6, 1947) was a U.S. representative from Connecticut.

Born in Norwich, Connecticut, to Irish immigrants, Fitzgerald attended St. Patrick's Parochial School in Norwich, Connecticut. He was employed in a foundry as a molder and later served as superintendent from 1904 to 1930. During this time, he served on the State commission to investigate widows' aid in 1916. He served as member of the Connecticut State Senate from 1931 to 1935, and as Deputy State Commissioner of Labor from 1931 to 1936.

Fitzgerald was elected as a Democrat to the Seventy-fifth Congress (January 3, 1937 – January 3, 1939). He was an unsuccessful candidate for reelection in 1938 to the Seventy-sixth Congress. He served as mayor of Norwich, Connecticut, in 1940 and 1941.

Fitzgerald was returned to the Seventy-seventh Congress (January 3, 1941 – January 3, 1943). He was an unsuccessful candidate for reelection in 1942, to the Seventy-eighth Congress. He was appointed on March 1, 1943, as area director and later as State Director of the War Manpower Commission of Connecticut and served until October 1, 1945. He was appointed State Director of the United States Employment Service and served until his resignation in January 1947.

He died at Norwich, Connecticut, May 6, 1947, and was interred in St. Joseph's Cemetery.

U.S. House of Representatives
Preceded by William L. Higgins	Member of the U.S. House of Representatives from Connecticut's 2nd congressional district 1937–1939	Succeeded by Thomas R. Ball
Preceded by Thomas R. Ball	Member of the U.S. House of Representatives from Connecticut's 2nd congressional district 1941–1943	Succeeded by John D. McWilliams
