= Charles J. Prestia =

American politician (1909–1953)

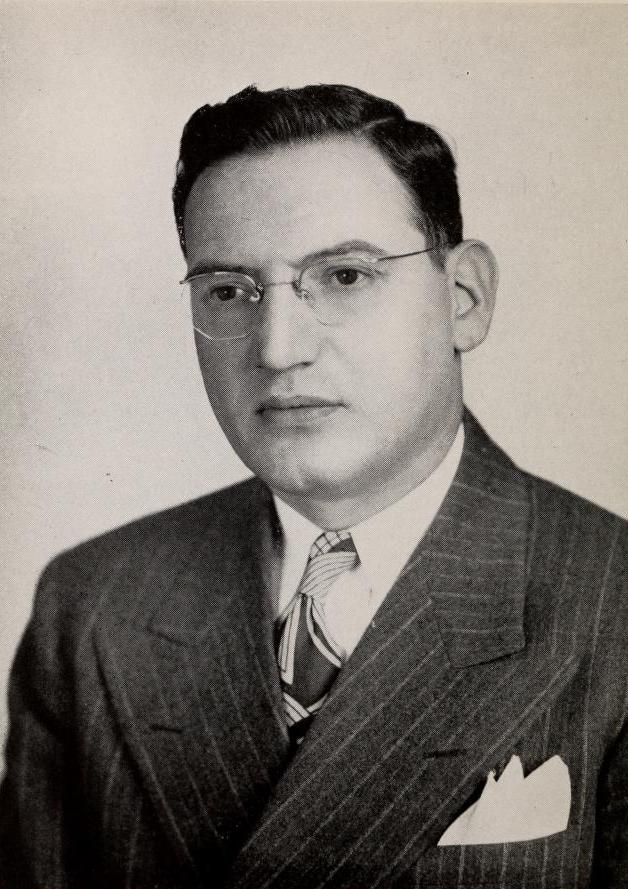
- Prestia in 1946

Secretary of the State of Connecticut
- In office January 3, 1945 – January 3, 1947
- Governor: Raymond E. Baldwin; Charles Wilbert Snow
- Preceded by: Frances B. Redick
- Succeeded by: Frances B. Redick

Personal details
- Born: September 3, 1909 New Britain, Connecticut, US
- Died: January 3, 1953 (aged 43) New Britain, Connecticut
- Party: Democratic
- Education: New Britain High School
- Occupation: Politician, businessman

Charles Joseph Prestia (September 3, 1909 – January 3, 1953) was an American politician and businessman who served one term as Secretary of the State of Connecticut from 1945 to 1947. A Democrat from New Britain, Connecticut, he served as a New Britain city councilor and alderman from 1935 to 1946 and as a Connecticut State Representative in 1935. Prestia also served on the Democratic state central committee and New Britain's Democratic town committee for "a number of years."

Born in New Britain to Italian-American parents Joseph and Lucia Prestia, Prestia graduated from New Britain High School and became vice president of sales at Spring Beverage Works, a local soft drinks company owned by his father. He died after a long illness at New Britain General Hospital at the age of 43. He had chaired the state police board from 1950 until his death.

Political offices
| Preceded by Frances B. Redick | Secretary of State of Connecticut; 1945–1947 | Succeeded by Frances B. Redick |
