= Sisters of Charity of Saint Elizabeth =

Religious congregation in the Catholic Church

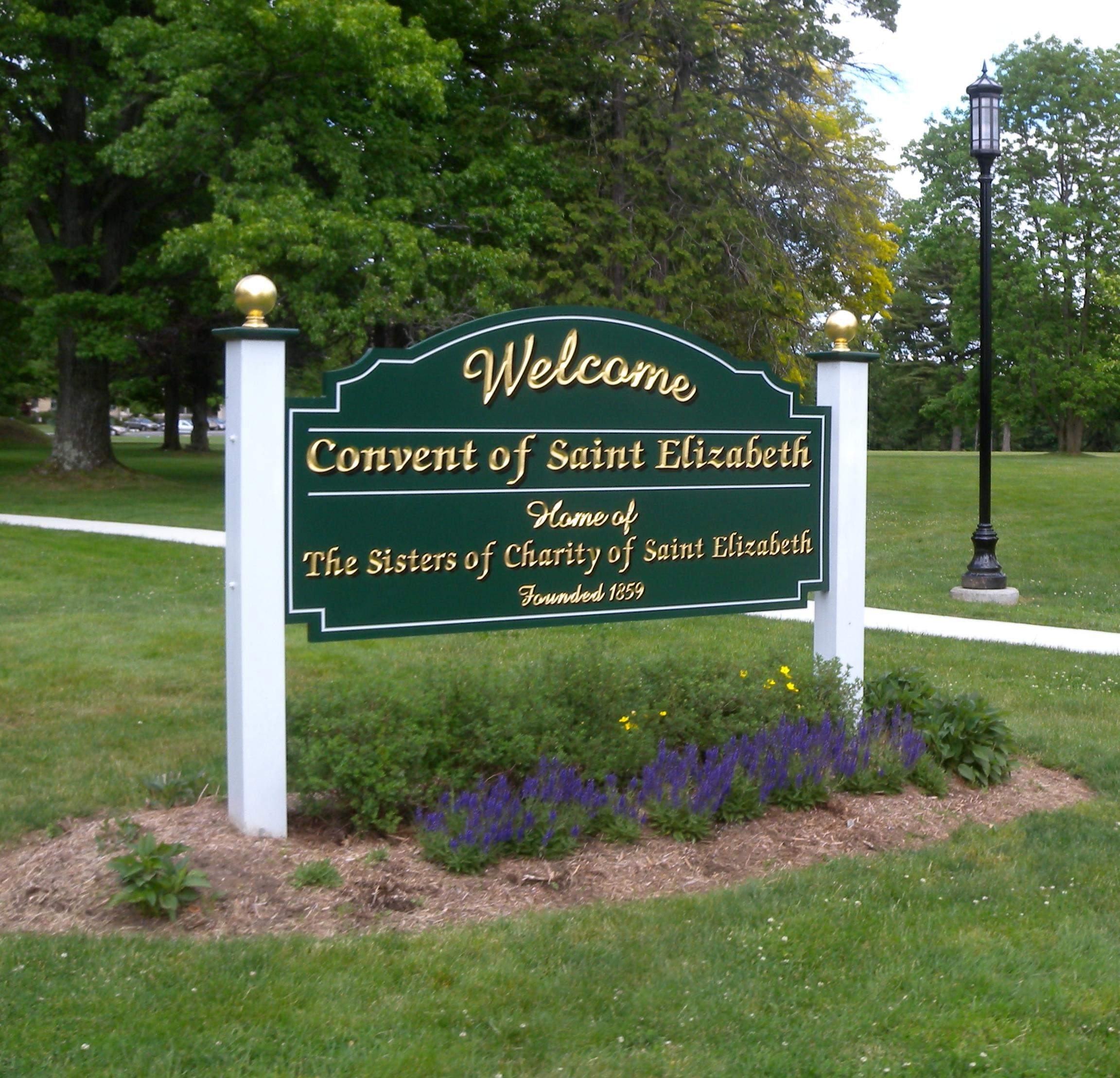
Entrance to the motherhouse

The Sisters of Charity of Saint Elizabeth is a Roman Catholic apostolic congregation of pontifical right, based in the Convent Station area of Morris Township, New Jersey, United States. The religious order was established in 1859 in Newark, New Jersey, following the example of Elizabeth Ann Seton's community that was founded in 1809 in Emmitsburg, Maryland.

== History ==
Mother Mary Xavier Mehegan, S.C.

In 1858, the first bishop of the Roman Catholic Archdiocese of Newark, James Roosevelt Bayley, a nephew of Elizabeth Ann Seton, applied to Mount Saint Vincent's, New York, for sisters to form a separate motherhouse in his diocese. Mary Xavier Mehegan, a member of the Sisters of Charity of New York was placed in charge of St. Mary's, Newark.

At the request of Bishop Bayley, Sister Mary Xavier was appointed superior of the new foundation, with Sister Mary Catherine Nevin as her assistant. The habit and the constitutions of the Sisters of Charity in New York were retained. On 29 September, 1859, the new community was formally opened in St. Mary's, Newark, the first superior general being the Reverend Bernard J. McQuaid, later Bishop of Rochester, New York. Bishop Bayley had strongly advocated a change in the head-dress of the sisters. This, however, was not carried into effect until 1874, when the black cap adopted by Mother Seton was replaced by a white one with a black veil.

=== Education ===
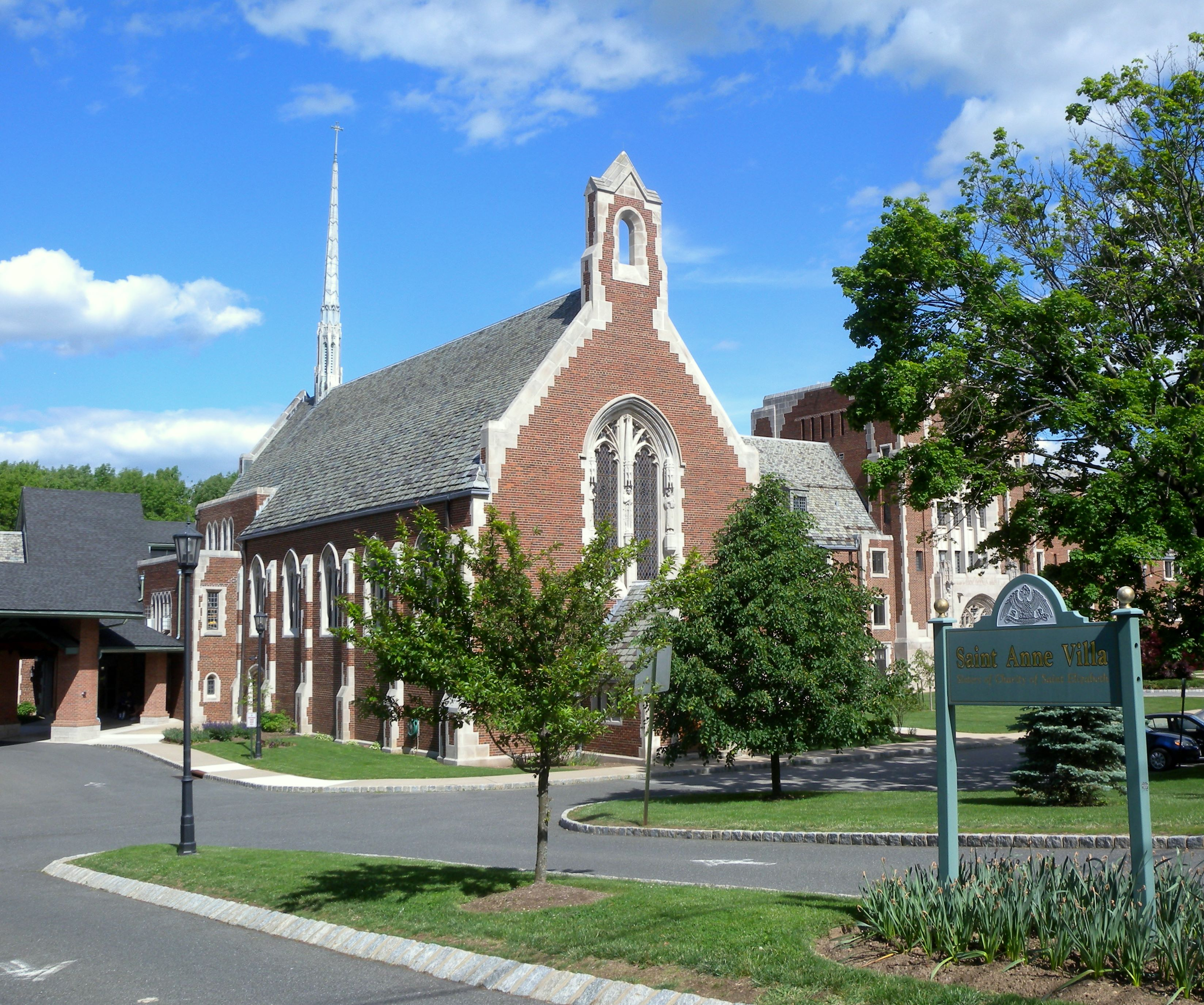
Saint Anne Villa, Morristown

The Sisters of Charity of Saint Elizabeth founded the Academy of Saint Elizabeth, the first secondary school for young women in the state, near Morristown in 1860 during the same year that they established their motherhouse at that location. Eventually, the nearby community became known as Convent Station because of a railway station built during the 1870s with funds provided by the order, to accommodate their needs. In 1899 the religious order also established the College of Saint Elizabeth on the same campus, becoming the first four year liberal arts college for women in New Jersey and one of the first Catholic colleges in the United States to award degrees to women. That same year, they established St. Aloysius Academy, a private school for women, in Jersey City. St. Aloysius closed in 2005.

The Saint Anne Villa is the retirement facility on the campus for members of the order. Later in 1935 the Sisters of Charity also sponsored another academy, Marylawn of the Oranges, a college preparatory school for young women in the Essex County area.

From 1924 until the Communist takeover in 1951, the community maintained missions in Yuanling and Wuki, Hunan, China. The missions included an elementary school, dispensary, and embroidery school, as well as, a hospital, nursing school, and high school for girls. During World War II, when forced to evacuate Hunan, the sisters served as nurses at the US 95th Station Hospital in Kunming.

=== Healthcare ===
During the Civil War, Sisters of Charity cared for soldiers on both sides in emergency hospitals set up at the train stations in Newark and Trenton. In 1867, the sisters founded St. Joseph's Hospital in Paterson. In 1895, they established a School of Nursing.

In August 1904, the Sisters of Charity of Saint Elizabeth, by approval of Bishop John J. O'Connor of Newark, took on the responsibility of planning and organizing a new hospital in the City of Elizabeth. On May 30, 1905, it opened its doors under the name of St. Elizabeth Hospital. Through the years many renovations and relocations took place. In January 2000, St. Elizabeth Hospital and Elizabeth General Medical Center were consolidated to form Trinitas Regional Medical Center, a service healthcare facility serving Eastern and Central Union County. It is also a Catholic teaching hospital. In 1906, at the request of a group of local physicians, the sisters founded the Hospital of Saint Raphael in New Haven, Connecticut. In 2012, it became the St. Raphael Campus of Yale-New Haven Hospital.

St. Raphael's Hospital in Faisalabad, Pakistan was also founded by the Elizabeth sisters.

== Ministry ==
As of 2019, the congregation had 451 vowed members serving in education, health care, pastoral and social service ministries in 15 states and in the U.S. Virgin Islands, El Salvador, Central America and Haiti. The Maris Stella Retreat and Conference Center is located on Barnegat Bay. The Sisters of Charity of Saint Elizabeth congregation is a member of the Sisters of Charity Federation in the Vincentian-Setonian Tradition.

== Notable members ==
- Blessed Miriam Teresa Demjanovich, S.C.
- Mary Xavier Mehegan
