= William L. Higgins =

American politician (1867–1951)

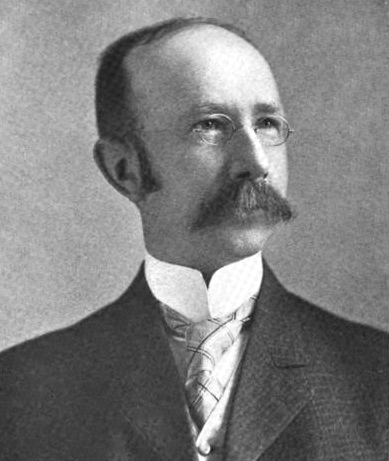

Member of the U.S. House of Representatives from Connecticut's 2nd district
- In office March 4, 1933 – January 3, 1937
- Preceded by: Richard P. Freeman
- Succeeded by: William J. Fitzgerald

Secretary of the State of Connecticut
- In office January 9, 1929 – January 3, 1933
- Governor: John H. Trumbull
- Preceded by: Francis A. Pallotti
- Succeeded by: John A. Danaher

Personal details
- Born: March 8, 1867 Chesterfield, Massachusetts, US
- Died: November 19, 1951 (aged 84) Norwich, Connecticut, US
- Resting place: Chesterfield Center Cemetery, Chesterfield, Massachusetts, US
- Party: Republican
- Education: University of the City of New York
- Occupation: Physician

William Lincoln Higgins (March 8, 1867 – November 19, 1951) was an American politician, physician, and U.S. representative from Connecticut from 1933 to 1937. A Republican from Coventry, Higgins also served four years as Secretary of the State of Connecticut and several terms in the Connecticut General Assembly.

== Biography ==
Born in Chesterfield, Massachusetts, Higgins attended the public schools of Chesterfield and Northampton and Deerfield Academy. He graduated from the medical department of the University of the City of New York in 1890 and commenced the practice of medicine in Willington, Connecticut, the same year. He moved to South Coventry, Connecticut, in 1891.

Higgins served in the Connecticut House of Representatives 1905–1907, 1917, 1919–1921, and 1925–1927. He served as member of the State Senate from 1909–1911. He was the first selectman of Coventry, Connecticut, from 1917–1932. He was the county commissioner of Tolland County, Connecticut, from 1921–1932. He served as Secretary of the State of Connecticut from 1929–1933. He was a delegate to the Republican National Conventions of 1928, 1932, and 1936.

Higgins was elected as a Republican to the Seventy-third and Seventy-fourth US Congresses (March 4, 1933 – January 3, 1937). He was an unsuccessful candidate for reelection in 1936 to the Seventy-fifth Congress.

After exiting politics, he resumed the practice of medicine in Coventry. He died in Norwich, Connecticut, on November 19, 1951 (aged 84). His remains were cremated and interred in Chesterfield Center Cemetery in Chesterfield.

Political offices
Preceded by Francis A. Pallotti	Secretary of the State of Connecticut; 1929–1933	Succeeded by John A. Danaher
U.S. House of Representatives
Preceded by Richard P. Freeman	Member of the U.S. House of Representatives from Connecticut's 2nd congressional district 1933–1937	Succeeded by William J. Fitzgerald
