= Charles B. Keats =

American politician (1905–1978)

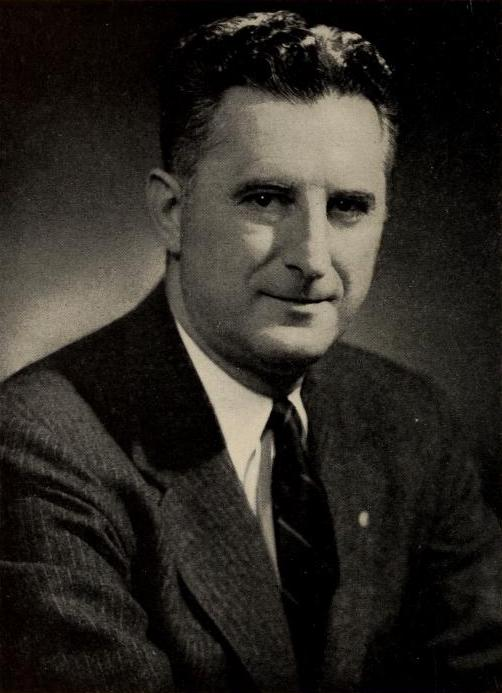

Secretary of the State of Connecticut
- In office December 1, 1953 – January 3, 1955
- Governor: John Davis Lodge
- Preceded by: Alice Leopold
- Succeeded by: Mildred P. Allen

Personal details
- Born: July 21, 1905 Bridgeport, Connecticut, US
- Died: February 18, 1978 (aged 72) Fort Lauderdale, Florida, US
- Party: Republican
- Education: Syracuse University
- Occupation: Politician, journalist

Charles B. Keats (July 21, 1905 – February 18, 1978) was an American politician and journalist who served as Secretary of the State of Connecticut from 1953 to 1955. A Republican from Bridgeport, Connecticut, he worked as a newspaper reporter and editor, Connecticut Republican Party publicity director, gubernatorial press secretary, and deputy secretary of state.

== Life and career ==
Keats was born in Bridgeport and graduated from Syracuse University in 1929, where he taught and coached boxing for two years. He worked as a reporter and editor for newspapers in Bridgeport, New York, and St. Louis from 1931 to 1940, illustrating many of his stories with his own cartoons. He was editor of Connecticut Federationist, the official publication of the Connecticut Federation of Labor. He subsequently worked as publicity director for the Connecticut Republican Party from 1940 to 1951 and as press secretary to Republican governors James L. McConaughy and James C. Shannon from 1947 to 1949.

Keats served as deputy secretary of state from January 1951 to December 1953, when Governor John Davis Lodge appointed him to the office of Secretary. Keats filled the unexpired term of Alice Leopold, who had resigned to lead the United States Women's Bureau. He did not run for a full term, and his political career concluded with his term of office in January 1955.

Keats ran his own public relations firm from 1941 to 1965 and was a partner with his brother, Harold A. Keats, in another public relations firm. In 1963 he retired and moved to Fort Lauderdale, Florida, where he and his brother co-owned a cattle ranch. Keats authored six books, including biographies of Amedeo Modigliani and Peggy Eaton. A lifelong artist who lived briefly in Greenwich Village after college, he painted portraits of Connecticut governors and exhibited his work nationwide.

His wife was Katherine (Kane) Keats of Bridgeport, who predeceased him. They had no children.

Political offices
Preceded by Alice Leopold	Secretary of State of Connecticut; 1953–1955	Succeeded by Mildred P. Allen
