= Horace Seely-Brown Jr. =

American politician (1908–1982)

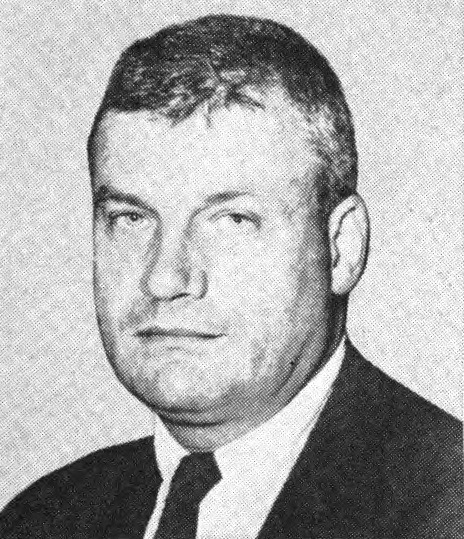

Member of the U.S. House of Representatives from Connecticut's 2nd district
- In office January 3, 1961 – January 3, 1963
- Preceded by: Chester Bowles
- Succeeded by: William L. St. Onge
- In office January 3, 1951 – January 3, 1959
- Preceded by: Chase G. Woodhouse
- Succeeded by: Chester Bowles
- In office January 3, 1947 – January 3, 1949
- Preceded by: Chase G. Woodhouse
- Succeeded by: Chase G. Woodhouse

Personal details
- Born: May 12, 1908 Kensington, Maryland, U.S.
- Died: April 9, 1982 (aged 73) Boca Raton, Florida, U.S.
- Citizenship: United States
- Party: Republican
- Spouse: Rosalie Hicks Seely-Brown
- Children: Horace Seely-Brown III; Rosalie Seely-Brown Parker; Constance Seely-Brown McClellan
- Education: Hamilton College
- Profession: teacher; fruit farmer; politician

Military service
- Allegiance: United States
- Branch/service: United States Navy
- Years of service: February 1943 to January 1946
- Rank: Air operations officer
- Unit: Carrier Aircraft Service Unit No. 2
- Battles/wars: World War II

Horace Seely-Brown Jr. (May 12, 1908 – April 9, 1982) was an American politician and a U.S. representative from Connecticut.

== Biography ==
Seely-Brown was born in Kensington, Maryland.He seems to have invented the hyphenization of his name. Neither his father nor his brother appears to have used hyphens, and Junior was known to all as "Seely." He seems to have invented the hyphenization of his name. Neither his father nor his brother appears to have used hyphens, and Junior was known to all as "Seely." He attended the Hoosac School in Hoosick, New York, and graduated from Hamilton College in Clinton, New York, in 1929. He was a graduate student at Yale University in 1929 and 1930. He married Rosalie Hicks and they had two daughters, Rosalie Seely-Brown Parker and Constance Seely-Brown McClellan, as well as a son, Horace Seely-Brown III.

== Career ==
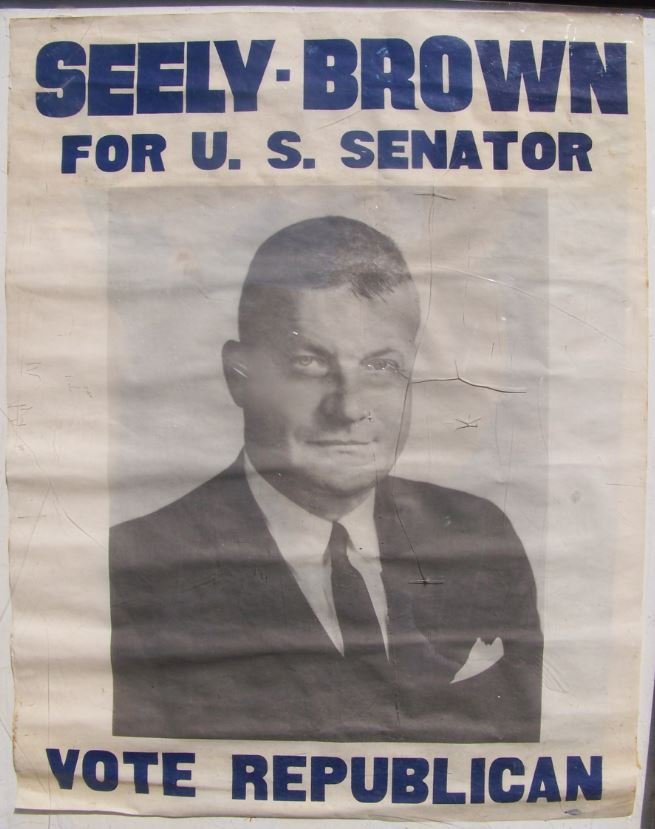
1962 election poster

Seely-Brown was a school teacher in Hoosick from 1930 to 1932, and in New Lebanon, New York, from 1932 to 1934. In 1934, he moved to Pomfret, Connecticut, where he taught, coached, and served as a dorm parent at Pomfret School until 1942. He was a delegate to the Republican state conventions in 1938, 1940, and 1942.

During World War II, Seely-Brown served in the United States Navy as air operations officer, Carrier Aircraft Service Unit No. 2, from February 1943 to January 1946. After the war he engaged in agricultural pursuits.

The second congressional district in Connecticut flipped U.S. House representatives between the two parties every two years from 1938, and 1946 was no different. Seely-Brown unseated the one-term Democrat Woodhouse and was elected as a Republican. In 1948 Woodhouse returned the favor as did Seely-Brown in 1950. He then managed to hang on against a new series of Democrats in 1952, 1954, and 1956, breaking the rhythm of the district. The Democratic year of 1958 and Democrat Chester Bowles cost him his seat. In 1960 Bowles, anticipating a role in the new Kennedy Administration, turned the contest over to a new Democrat, who lost to Seely-Brown by a bare 456 votes. In 1962 Seely-Brown opted to be the Republican candidate for the U.S. Senate seat of retiring Republican Prescott Bush and was defeated in a close race with the Democratic former governor, Abraham Ribicoff, receiving 48% of the vote.

Overall, Seely-Brown served in the Eightieth Congress from January 3, 1947, to January 3, 1949, in the Eighty-second, the Eighty-third, the Eighty-fourth, and the Eighty-fifth congresses, from January 3, 1951, to January 3, 1959, and the Eighty-seventh Congress from January 3, 1961, to January 3, 1963. Seely-Brown voted in favor of the Civil Rights Act of 1957, but voted present on the 24th Amendment to the U.S. Constitution. He supported the Coast Guard Academy, which was in his district, and was the sponsor of four successful public bills, covering the Merchant Marine, the Panama Canal staff, and two local matters. After political office, he resumed agricultural pursuits and resided in Pomfret Center, Connecticut.

== Death ==
Seely-Brown died in Boca Raton, Palm Beach County, Florida, at his winter home, on April 9, 1982 at the age of 73. He is interred at Christ Episcopal Church Cemetery, Pomfret Center, Pomfret, Connecticut.

Party political offices
Preceded by Prescott Bush	Republican nominee for U.S. Senator from Connecticut (Class 3); 1962	Succeeded by Edwin H. May Jr.
U.S. House of Representatives
Preceded by Chase G. Woodhouse	United States Representative for the 2nd Congressional District of Connecticut; 1947–1949	Succeeded by Chase G. Woodhouse
Preceded by Chase G. Woodhouse	United States Representative for the 2nd Congressional District of Connecticut; 1951–1959	Succeeded by Chester Bowles
Preceded by Chester Bowles	United States Representative for the 2nd Congressional District of Connecticut; 1961–1963	Succeeded by William L. St. Onge
