= Hospital of Saint Raphael =

Saint Raphael Campus of Yale New Haven Hospital
- Yale New Haven Hospital

Geography
- Location: 1450 Chapel Street, New Haven, Connecticut, United States
- Coordinates: 41°18′37″N 72°56′34″W

Organization
- Type: Teaching
- Affiliated university: Yale School of Medicine

Services
- Beds: 511 (licensed)

History
- Founded: 1911; 115 years ago

Links
- Website: www.ynhh.org
- Lists: Hospitals in Connecticut

The Hospital of Saint Raphael or Saint Raphael Hospital, located in New Haven, Connecticut, United States, was a 511-bed community teaching hospital founded by the Sisters of Charity of Saint Elizabeth in 1907. On September 12, 2012, Yale-New Haven Hospital acquired Saint Raphael and converted into the Yale-New Haven Hospital Saint Raphael Campus.

== History ==
In 1907, the Sisters of Charity of Saint Elizabeth came to New Haven to start the hospital at the request of a group of local physicians, led by Dr. William F. Verdi. The doctors asked the Sisters of Charity to administer a hospital that would "receive and care for all patients who might apply for admission without regard to creed or race: To extend charity to the sick, poor, and to offer the institution to those of the medical profession who desire to care for their own patients".

A 12-bed hospital, named after St. Rafael, was opened at 1442 Chapel Street in the Barnes Residence in 1907. It was located next to Grace Hospital, a private homeopathic institute. Almost immediately, plans were developed to add more capacity, and the Saint Mary Pavilion was built, opening in 1910. It was built next to the original building and had 135 beds. The Hospital of Saint Raphael opened a School of Nursing and formed its auxiliary.

In the 1910s, the Hospital of Saint Raphael received its first X-ray machine, opened its first pharmacy, and acquired its first motorized ambulance. The flu epidemic of 1918 created a need for more beds, and the hospital expanded to include the new St. Rita's wing. It also opened a modern laboratory, and hired its first full-time anesthesiologist. In 1927, Saint Vincent's Pavilion, an isolation pavilion for children with infectious diseases, became the center of the hospital's pediatric services. A former nurses' dormitory, it was located on George Street.

Sister Louise Anthony Geronemo, a novice Sister of Charity, arrived at the Hospital of Saint Raphael in 1935 to train at the School of Nursing. She went on to serve the hospital in a variety of roles over the next 62 years, including 22 years as hospital administrator.

In 1940, the Hospital of Saint Raphael broke ground on a $1,250,000 addition. With a six-story unit facing Chapel Street and five stories on Sherman Avenue, the bed capacity rose to 430. The hospital opened a School of Medical Technology, one of the first in the nation. It established formal orthopedics, anesthesia, and outpatient departments. This was a training site for World War II U.S. Cadet Nurse Corps.

In the 1950s, the hospital opened Southern New England's first radiation therapy center. It was one of the first community hospitals in New England to perform open-heart surgery.

In the 1960s, the hospital opened one of the first cardiac catheterization labs and cardiac care units in Connecticut. It was the first Catholic hospital in the United States to establish a recognized pastoral care department.

In the 1970s, a longstanding relationship with Yale School of Medicine was formalized, enhancing St. Raphael's role as a community teaching hospital. The Verdi Memorial Building opened in 1976, which expanded and improved upon the hospital's surgical, emergency, and intensive care services.

In the 1980s, Saint Raphael Healthcare System formed and acquired Saint Regis Health Center, a 125-bed skilled nursing facility. The Hospital of Saint Raphael opened the first outpatient chemotherapy/transfusion unit in Connecticut.

In the 1990s, the Father Michael J. McGivney Center for Cancer Care opened. The system grew and became affiliated with Regional Visiting Nurse Agency and Shoreline VNA, both home-care providers. The hospital made the list of 100 Top Hospitals for overall services in 1998 and 1999 through independent, benchmarked studies performed at the time by HCIA, Inc. IBM Watson now maintains this list of hospitals.

In 2013, the Hospital of Saint Raphael was acquired by and became a separate extended campus of Yale New Haven Hospital.

=== Adams Neuroscience Center ===
Currently under construction and set to be open in 2027, the Adams Neuroscience Center will be a new 505,000 sq. foot complex of two towers with 204 in-patient beds. The complex will specialize in treating movement and neurodegenerative disorders as well as strokes. In addition, the project will allow for the demolition of much of the existing East Pavilion of the main Yale New Haven campus, built in 1953 and currently housing 300+ patient beds.
