= Frances Burke Redick =

American politician (1894–1974)

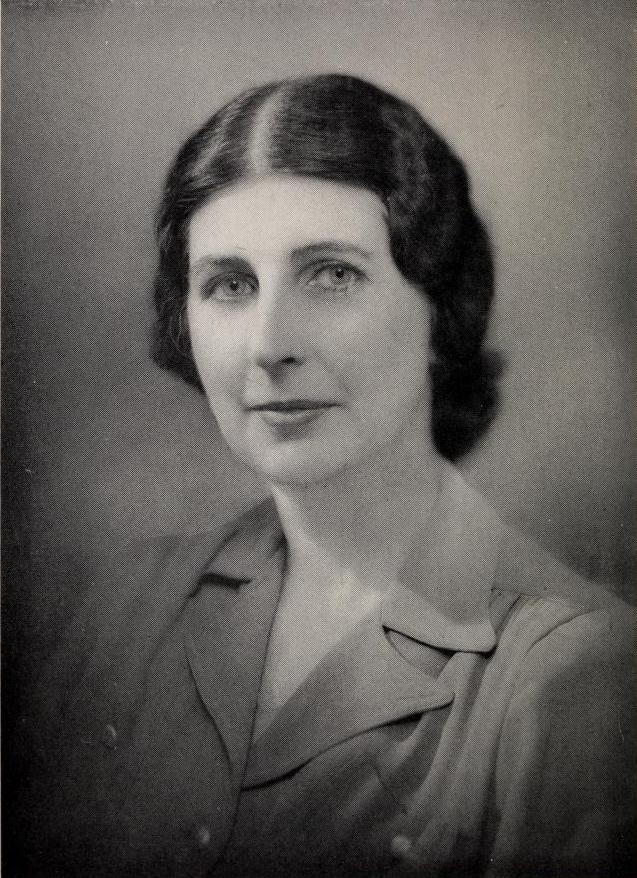
- Redick ca. 1948

Secretary of the State of Connecticut
- In office 1947–1949
- Governor: James L. McConaughy
- Preceded by: Charles J. Prestia
- Succeeded by: Winifred McDonald
- In office 1943–1945
- Governor: Raymond E. Baldwin
- Preceded by: Chase G. Woodhouse
- Succeeded by: Charles J. Prestia

Personal details
- Born: Frances Burke; June 19, 1894 Shekomeko, New York, US
- Died: May 14, 1974 (aged 79) Hartford, Connecticut, US
- Party: Republican
- Occupation: Politician

Frances Burke Redick (June 19, 1894 – May 14, 1974) was an American politician who served as Secretary of the State of Connecticut and as a member of the Connecticut House of Representatives during the 1940s.

Redick was born in Shekomeko, New York, and attended school in Middletown, Connecticut. She then taught in Middletown for four years before working for Travelers Insurance Companies.

In 1940, Redick was elected to the Connecticut House of Representatives from Newington. She served as Connecticut's secretary of state from 1943 to 1945 and from 1947 until 1949. She was also a delegate to the state's constitutional conventions in 1948 and 1965.

Redick was a delegate to the 1948 Republican National Convention. In nominating Raymond Baldwin, she became the first woman to make a nominating speech for a presidential candidate.

Redick died on May 14, 1974.

== See also ==
- List of female state secretaries of state in the United States
