= Teresa Demjanovich =

Ruthenian Greek Catholic religious sister (1901–1927)

Blessed Miriam Teresa Demjanovich SC
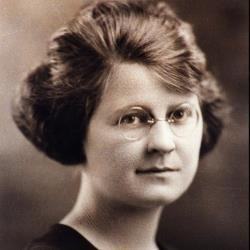
- College yearbook picture of Demjanovich
- Born: March 26, 1901; Bayonne, New Jersey, United States
- Residence: Convent Station, New Jersey, United States
- Died: May 8, 1927 (aged 26); New Jersey, United States
- Venerated in: Catholic Church
- Beatified: 4 October 2014, Newark, New Jersey, United States, by Cardinal Angelo Amato
- Major shrine: Sisters of Charity Motherhouse, Convent Station, New Jersey, United States
- Feast: 8 May

Miriam Teresa Demjanovich, SC (March 26, 1901 – May 8, 1927) was an American Ruthenian Greek Catholic and a member of the Sisters of Charity of St. Elizabeth. For a life of servitude, much spiritual writing and several blessings to those who invoked her after death, she was beatified by the Catholic Church in 2014. The ceremony, held in Newark, New Jersey, was the first such to take place in the United States.

== Early life ==
She was born Teresa Demjanovich in Bayonne, New Jersey, on March 26, 1901, the youngest of the seven children of Alexander Demjanovich and Johanna Suchy, Ruthenian immigrants to the United States from what is now eastern Slovakia. She received Baptism, Chrismation, and First Holy Communion in the Ruthenian Rite of her parents.

Demjanovich grew up beside the oil refineries that mark the landscape of this portion of New Jersey. She completed her grammar school education by the age of eleven, and received her high school diploma in January 1917, from Bayonne High School (at that time located in the present-day Robinson School).

== Career and religious beginning ==
At this time, she wished to become a Carmelite, but stayed in the family home to care for her sick mother. After her mother died in the influenza epidemic of November 1918, she was encouraged by her family to attend the College of Saint Elizabeth at Convent Station, New Jersey. She began her college career in September 1919, majoring in literature, and graduated with highest honors in June 1923.

It is claimed that Demjanovich desired a religious life, but various circumstances made her uncertain which community she should enter. Meanwhile, she accepted a teaching position at the Academy of Saint Aloysius in Jersey City. During her time at the college, many individuals remarked on her humility and genuine piety. She could be found kneeling in the college chapel at all hours and was very devoted to praying the rosary.

Demjanovich was part of the Saint Vincent de Paul Parish choir, the Sodality of Our Lady, and a parish community associated with the National Catholic Welfare Conference. During the summer and fall of 1924, Teresa prayed to discern the direction of her life. She visited the Discalced Carmelite nuns in The Bronx, New York. Because of several health issues including headaches, the Sisters suggested that Demjanovich wait a few years before applying. After consulting with her family, the Sisters then suggested that Demjanovich use her education to serve God in a teaching order.

For the Feast of the Immaculate Conception that year, Demjanovich made a novena and at its conclusion on December 8, decided she was called to enter the Sisters of Charity of St. Elizabeth. Demjanovich planned to enter the convent on 2 February 1925, but her father caught a cold and died on 30 January. Her entrance was delayed until 11 February 1925, the Feast of Our Lady of Lourdes. Her brother, Fr. Charles Demjanovich, and two sisters, accompanied her to the convent. Demjanovich was admitted to the novitiate of the religious congregation and received the religious habit on 17 May 1925. She never received an official transfer of rite, and remained a Byzantine Rite Catholic while serving as a religious sister in a Latin Church congregation.

== Religious life and death ==
As a postulant and novice, Demjanovich taught at the Academy of Saint Elizabeth in Convent Station during 1925–1926. In June 1926, her spiritual director, Father Benedict Bradley, O.S.B., asked her to write the conferences for the novitiate. She wrote 26 conferences which, after her death, were published in a book, Greater Perfection.

In November 1926, after a tonsillectomy, she returned to the convent but could barely walk to her room. After a few days. Demjanovich asked if she could return to the infirmary. Demjanovich's superior, skeptical that someone so young could be so sick, told her, "pull yourself together". When Bradley saw how sick she was, he notified her brother, who called one of their sisters, a nurse. When Demjanovich's sister arrived at the convent, she took Demjanovich to the hospital, where Demjanovich was diagnosed with "physical and nervous exhaustion, with myocarditis and acute appendicitis". Doctors were concerned that she was not strong enough for an operation, and her condition worsened.

Demjanovich's profession of permanent religious vows was made in periculo mortis (danger of death) on 2 April 1927. She was operated on for appendicitis on 6 May and died on 8 May 1927. Her funeral was held 11 May 1927 at Holy Family Chapel in Convent Station, New Jersey, and she was buried at Holy Family Cemetery on the grounds of her order's motherhouse.

Favors and cures attributed to her intercession are continually being reported.

== Cause for canonization ==
The Sisters of Charity petitioned Rome for permission to open a cause for her beatification because of Demjanovich's saintly life, her striving for perfection in her religious life, spiritual writings, and the favors received by others after her death through her intercession with God.

In the latter part of 1945, a communication was received from the Holy See authorizing Thomas H. McLaughlin, Bishop of the Diocese of Paterson, in which the motherhouse of the Sisters of Charity is located, to institute an ordinary informative process concerning Demjanovich's life and virtues. Rev. Stephen W Findlay, O.S.B, of the Delbarton School, near Morristown, New Jersey, was appointed procurator, and the official investigation began early in 1946. The Sister Miriam Teresa League of Prayer was founded in the summer of 1946 to spread the knowledge of her life and mission, and to work for the cause of her beatification. The headquarters for the League is located in the Administration Building of the Sisters of Charity of St. Elizabeth. Silvia Correale is the present Postulator for the Cause of Sister Miriam Teresa in the Congregation for the Causes of Saints.

On Thursday, May 10, 2012, Demjanovich was proclaimed venerable by Pope Benedict XVI. On December 17, 2013, Pope Francis approved the attribution of miraculous healing to the intercession of Demjanovich, opening the way to her beatification. The cause of her beatification involved the restoration of perfect vision to a boy who had gone legally blind because of macular degeneration. Msgr. Giampaolo Rizzotti of the Congregation for the Causes of the Saints added that the miracle took place in 1964. Demjanovich was beatified at a ceremony on October 4, 2014, held at the Cathedral Basilica of the Sacred Heart in Newark. This was the first time a beatification had ever been held in the United States. In 2017, Stanley Rother and Solanus Casey would become the second and third Americans to be beatified in the United States.

The following day, Kurt Burnette, Bishop of the Byzantine Catholic Eparchy of Passaic to which Demjanovich belonged, presided at a Divine Liturgy at the parish of her baptism, Saint John the Baptist Church in Bayonne.

== Veneration ==
According to Sister Marian Jose, S.C., Vice Postulator of the Cause of Sister Miriam Teresa, Demjanovich's message is that “everyone is called to holiness”.

Saint Mary's Catholic Church in Dumont, New Jersey has a newly commissioned painting of Sister Miriam Teresa Demjanovich by Juan Pablo Esteban, a seminarian and artist. The portrait will hang in the vestibule area of the church.

On January 1, 2016, the Blessed Miriam Teresa Demjanovich Parish in Bayonne, New Jersey was established after the merger of St. Mary Star of the Sea and St. Andrew the Apostle churches.

A first-class relic of Blessed Miriam Teresa is part of the Treasures of the Church Exposition.

== Writings ==
- Charles C. Demjanovich, ed. (1928). Greater Perfection: Being the Spiritual Conferences of Sister Miriam Teresa. New York: P.J. Kenedy & Sons. OCLC 7881709.
- Charles C. Demjanovich, ed. (1954). The Seventieth Week. Paterson, New Jersey: St. Anthony Guild Press. OCLC 4338827.
- Meditations on the Stations of the Cross. Convent Station, New Jersey: Sister Miriam Teresa League of Prayer. OCLC 74278575.
- The Sacrifice of the Mass: The Greatest Means of Sanctification. Convent Station, New Jersey: Sister Miriam Teresa League of Prayer.

== Biographies ==
- Harris, Elizabeth (1979) [1959]. Sister Miriam Teresa. Convent Station, New Jersey: Sister Miriam Teresa League of Prayer. OCLC 43262874.
- by a Sister of Charity (1957) [1936]. Sister Miriam Teresa. New York: Benzinger Brothers. OCLC 35232220.
- Conklin, Margaret (1981) [1946]. An American Teresa. Long Island City, NY: Color Graphic Press. OCLC 1957189.
- Chambre, Renée (1970). Soeur Miriam Térèsa, Apôtre de l'unité (in French). Québec. OCLC 301717002.
- Chambre, Marie-Thérèse (1971). Sister Miriam Teresa, Apostle of Unity. Mahwah, NJ: The Unity League. OCLC 309029.
- Maynard, Theodore (1957). Great Catholics in American History. Garden City, NY: Hanover House. pp. 235–242. OCLC 1215895.
- Blaško, Štefan (1984). Miriam Teresa - Faithful in a Little. Toronto: Maria - Magazine. OCLC 70672989.
- Šencik, S.J., Štefan (1974). Kvet z Bardejovských Záhonov (Flowers of the Fields of Bardejov) (in Slovak). Rome. OCLC 7209115.
- Šencik, S.J., Štefan (1981). Ne Ceste Za Väčšou Dokonalosťou (Towards Greater Perfection) (in Slovak). Rome. OCLC 320530682.
- Middleton, Kathleen M. (2000). Bayonne Passages (from the "Images of America" Series). Charleston, SC: Arcadia. pp. 72–75. ISBN 0-7524-0563-2.

== Articles ==
- Ward Miele. "Documents for beatification sent to Congregation officials in Rome". The Catholic Advocate (July 28, 2004). Archived from the original on February 4, 2012.
- Karen DeMasters (July 12, 1998). "Q & A; This Saint May Take A While To March In". The New York Times (July 12, 1998).
- Al Sullivan (31 March 2022). "One step closer to God: Bayonne native on path to possible sainthood". Hudson Reporter (November 8, 2004).
- Brendan I. Koerner. "Saint Makers". U.S. News & World Report (January 11, 1999): 52–60.
- Kevin Coyne (March 23, 2008). "Persevering for a Saint of Their Own". The New York Times (March 23, 2008).
- Al Sullivan (31 March 2022). "Closer to sainthood: Bayonne native is elevated by Pope". Hudson Reporter (August 22, 2012).
