= Saint Elizabeth University =

Catholic university in Morris County, New Jersey, US

Coordinates: 40.781°N 74.438°W

- Former name: College of Saint Elizabeth (1899–2020)
- Motto: Deus Est Caritas (Latin)
- Motto in English: God is love
- Type: Private university
- Established: September 11, 1899; 126 years ago
- Affiliations: Catholic (Sisters of Charity of Saint Elizabeth)
- Academic affiliations: NAICU; CIC; ACCU
- Endowment: US$ $15.7 million
- President: Gary B. Crosby
- Students: 1,141
- Location: Morris Township and Florham Park, New Jersey, U.S.
- Campus: Suburban, 200 acres (0.81 km^{2})
- Colors: Dark Blue and Bright Blue
- Nickname: Eagles
- Sporting affiliations: NCAA Division III – UEC
- Mascot: Eagle
- Website: steu.edu

Saint Elizabeth University (SEU) (formerly College of Saint Elizabeth, CSE) is a private Catholic university in Morris Township, New Jersey, United States. Portions of the campus are also in Florham Park. SEU offers 25 undergraduate degree programs, 16 master's degree programs, and 2 doctoral degree programs.

== History ==
The College of Saint Elizabeth was founded in 1899 by the Sisters of Charity of Saint Elizabeth and was among the first Catholic colleges in the United States to award degrees to women. It is located in a complex which includes the order's motherhouse and convent, as well as a preparatory school for girls.

The college began transitioning into a co-educational institution, starting with the 2016 freshman intake. The final all-female class graduated in 2019. The institution was accorded university status by the New Jersey Department of Education as of July 1, 2020. It was the last women-only college in the state.

The school is named for St. Elizabeth, the cousin of Mary (mother of Jesus). The college was founded by the Sisters of Charity, the order started by Elizabeth Ann Seton (1774–1821), who, after her death, was canonized as the United States' first native-born saint. (Seton Hall University in New Jersey and Seton Hill University in Pennsylvania are named after Elizabeth Ann Seton.)

== Campus ==
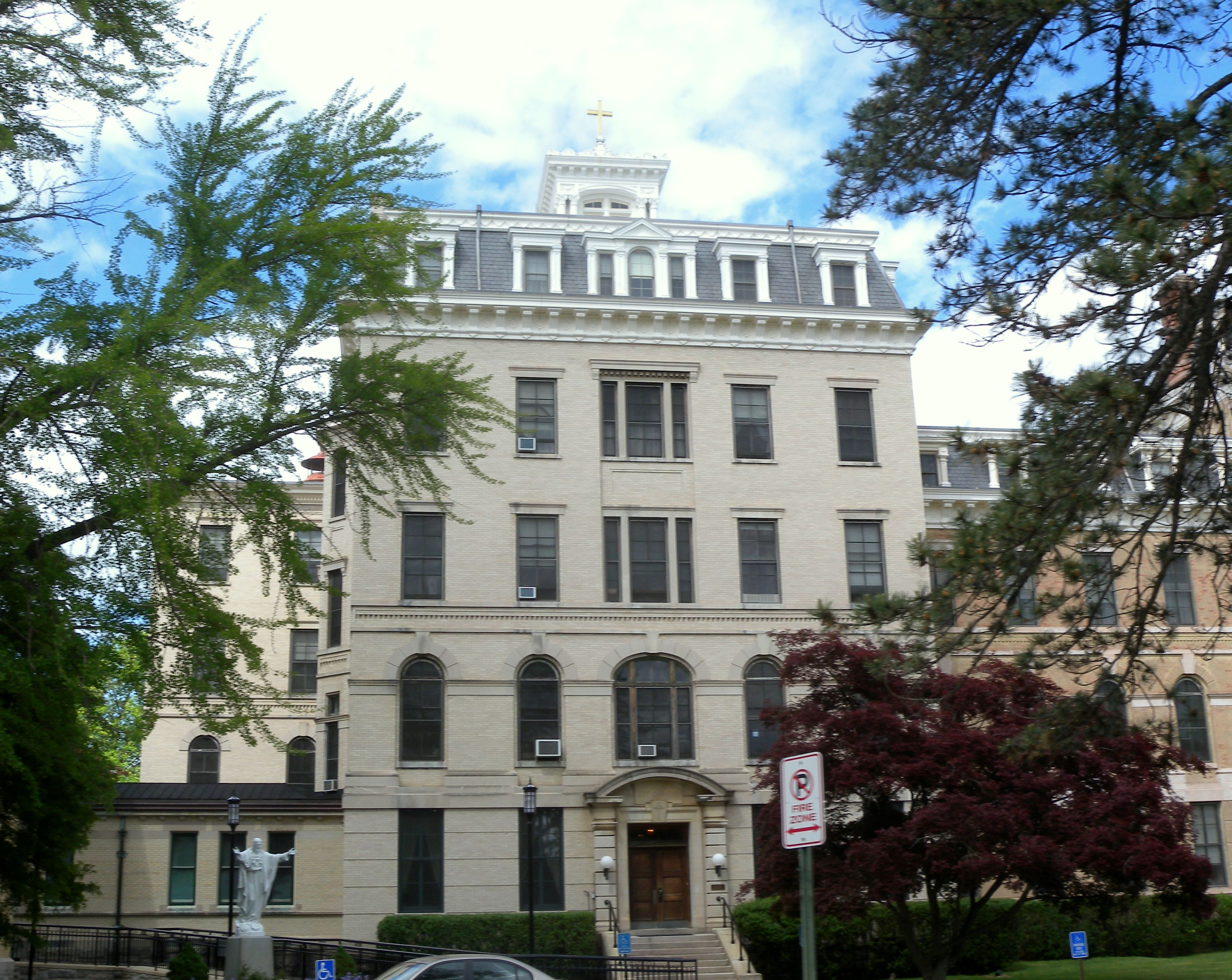
Elizabeth convent

Saint Elizabeth University is located on the campus of the Sisters of Charity of Saint Elizabeth. The 200-acre (0.81 km^{2}) wooded campus is home to the classical Greek amphitheater built into a hillside and the original dairy farm for the complex.

Part of the grounds are in Florham Park Borough. Other parts are in Convent Station, Morris Township.

The Convent Station of NJ Transit, located on the campus of Saint Elizabeth University, provides rail transportation both east and west of Convent Station. The trains are the midtown direct line of the Morris & Essex Lines.

Saint Elizabeth University has eight buildings:

- Santa Rita Hall (Admission, financial aid, administration)
- Henderson Hall (Sciences, nursing, foods and nutrition)
- Saint Joseph Hall (Athletics, dining hall)
- Santa Maria Hall (Classrooms)
- Mahoney Library (Classrooms, Conklin Academic Success Center)
- Annunciation Center (Classrooms, Dolan Performance Hall, academic offices)
- O'Connor Hall (student residence)
- Founders Hall (student residence)

The classical Greek Theatre is used for concerts and performances. The Shakespeare Garden, completed in 1931, and a greenhouse, built in 1911 also sit on the campus.

== Athletics ==
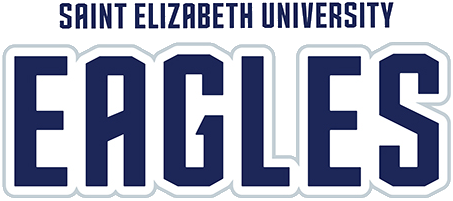
Saint Elizabeth athletics wordmark

The Saint Elizabeth athletic teams are called the Eagles. The university is a member of the Division III ranks of the National Collegiate Athletic Association (NCAA), primarily competing in the United East Conference (UEC) since the 2023–24 academic year; which they were a member on a previous stint from 2009–10 to 2018–19. The Eagles previously competed in the Colonial States Athletic Conference (CSAC) from 2019–20 to 2022–23.

Saint Elizabeth competes in 12 intercollegiate varsity sports: Men's sports include baseball, basketball, cross country, soccer, tennis and volleyball; while women's sports include basketball, cross country, soccer, softball, tennis and volleyball.

== Notable alumni ==
- David Clowney (born 1985), wide receiver who played in the NFL for the New York Jets.
- Sister Carmela Marie Cristiano (1927–2011), Sister of Charity of Saint Elizabeth who served the community as a teacher, social worker and activist, who was the first religious sister to run for office in New Jersey.
- Blessed Miriam Teresa Demjanovich (1901–1927; graduated 1923), Sister of Charity of Saint Elizabeth and author of Greater Perfection, who was beatified in 2014.
- Rita Lenihan (1914–1989), officer in the United States Navy who served as Director of the WAVES and Assistant Chief of Naval Personnel for Women from 1966 to 1970.
- Winifred McDonald (1888–1976; BA 1910), politician and schoolteacher who served as Secretary of the State of Connecticut (1949–1951).
- Shirley Tolentino (1943–2010; BA 1965), the first black woman to serve on New Jersey Superior Court and the first black woman appointed to the Jersey City Municipal Court and to serve as its presiding judge.
- Louise Currie Wilmot (born 1942; BA 1964), United States Navy Rear Admiral, who was the first woman to command a United States Naval base.

== See also ==
- Academy of Saint Elizabeth
