= John D. McWilliams =

American politician

Member of the U.S. House of Representatives from Connecticut's 2nd district
- In office January 3, 1943 – January 3, 1945
- Preceded by: William J. Fitzgerald
- Succeeded by: Chase G. Woodhouse

Personal details
- Born: July 23, 1891 Norwich, Connecticut
- Died: March 30, 1975 (aged 83) Norwich, Connecticut
- Party: Republican

John Dacher McWilliams (July 23, 1891 – March 30, 1975) was a U.S. representative from Connecticut.

He was born in Norwich, Connecticut, to Elizabeth A. (née McClure) and John McWilliams. His father was an immigrant from Ireland. McWilliams attended the public schools and Norwich Free Academy, and graduated from Mercersburg Academy in Pennsylvania in 1910. He worked in the building industry in Norwich, Connecticut. During the First World War, he served as a private in the Twentieth Engineers, United States Army, with overseas service, from March 26, 1918, until discharged on July 1, 1919. He resumed the building business. He served as a selectman of the town of Norwich, Connecticut, from 1935 to 1942.

McWilliams was elected as a Republican to the Seventy-eighth Congress (January 3, 1943 – January 3, 1945). He was an unsuccessful candidate for reelection in 1944 to the Seventy-ninth Congress. He was employed at the electric boat division of General Dynamics Corporation, Groton, Connecticut, from 1950 to 1960. He was employed by the city of Norwich, where he resided until his death thereon March 30, 1975. He was interred in Maplewood Cemetery, Norwich, Connecticut.

U.S. House of Representatives
Preceded by William J. Fitzgerald	Member of the U.S. House of Representatives from Connecticut's 2nd congressional district 1943–1945	Succeeded by Chase G. Woodhouse
