= Danny Clark =

Danny Clark may refer to:

- Danny Clark (baseball) (1894–1937), American baseball player
- Danny Lee Clark (born 1964), American actor, best known for American Gladiators
- Danny Clark (cyclist) (born 1951), Australian racing cyclist and Olympic medalist
- Danny Clark (American football) (born 1977), American football player
- Danny Clark (born 1990) Bournemouth

== See also ==
- Dan Clark (disambiguation)
- Daniel Clark (disambiguation)
