= Daniel Clark (Connecticut colonial leader) =

English-born lawyer and politician (1622–1710))

- Born: c. 1622; Tarvin, Cheshire, England
- Died: August 10, 1710 (aged 87–88); Windsor, Connecticut Colony, British America
- Occupations: Lawyer; militia officer; politician
- Spouses: Mary Newberry; Martha (Pitkin) Wolcott
- Children: 9

Daniel Clark (c. 1622 – 10 August 1710) was an English-born lawyer, militia officer, and politician who was the fourth Secretary of the Colony of Connecticut, from 1658-1664 and 1665-1667, and holder of various offices in colonial Connecticut. He has been known as the "great grandfather of Governors" given the number of his descendants who have held that position in Connecticut and Massachusetts.

Clark was born in Tarvin, Cheshire, England in 1622. In 1639, he immigrated to America with his uncle and resided in Windsor, Connecticut. He was a representative to the General Court from 1657-1661, member of the Court of Assistants from 1662-1664, in addition to serving as Secretary of the Colony. He was also a member of the committee to appoint and commission officers of the militia and the Committee to Advise the Indians. In 1662, he was one of the 19 signers and grantees of the Connecticut Charter, and in 1664 he was commissioned as captain in the Colonial Troops, serving in King Philip's War. He died in Windsor on 10 August 1710.

== Family ==
He was the son of Sabbath Clark (Rector of Tarvin Chapel) and Elizabeth (Overton) Clark (granddaughter of Bishop William Overton and great granddaughter of Bishop William Barlow).

Daniel's first married Mary Newberry, who was the mother of all of his nine children and who died in 1688. Following her death, in 1689 he married Martha (Pitkin) Wolcott, the widow of Simon Wolcott, and became stepfather of her six children, including future Connecticut colonial governor Roger Wolcott, who served as governor from 1750-1754. Clark's great-grandson (through Roger Wolcott, who married Clark's biological granddaughter, Sarah Drake) was Oliver Wolcott, a signer of the Declaration of Independence and the Articles of Confederation, and governor of Connecticut from 1796 until his death a year later. Oliver Wolcott's son, Oliver Wolcott Jr., also served as governor of Connecticut, from 1817-1827, in addition to serving as the second Secretary of the Treasury from 1795-1800. Several other governors of Connecticut, Roger Griswold and Clark Bissell, in addition to a governor of Massachusetts, Roger Wolcott, are also descended from Daniel Clark.

== New England's Last Witch Trial ==
Clark served as the prosecuting attorney on behalf of the Crown against Winifred King Benham and her daughter Winifred of Wallingford in the last witch trial conducted in New England in 1697. They were charged with "having familiarity with Satan the Enemy of God and mankind, and by aid doing many preternatural acts". The Benham women subsequently had the charges dismissed.
