= Academy of Saint Elizabeth =

Catholic high school in Morris County, New Jersey, United States

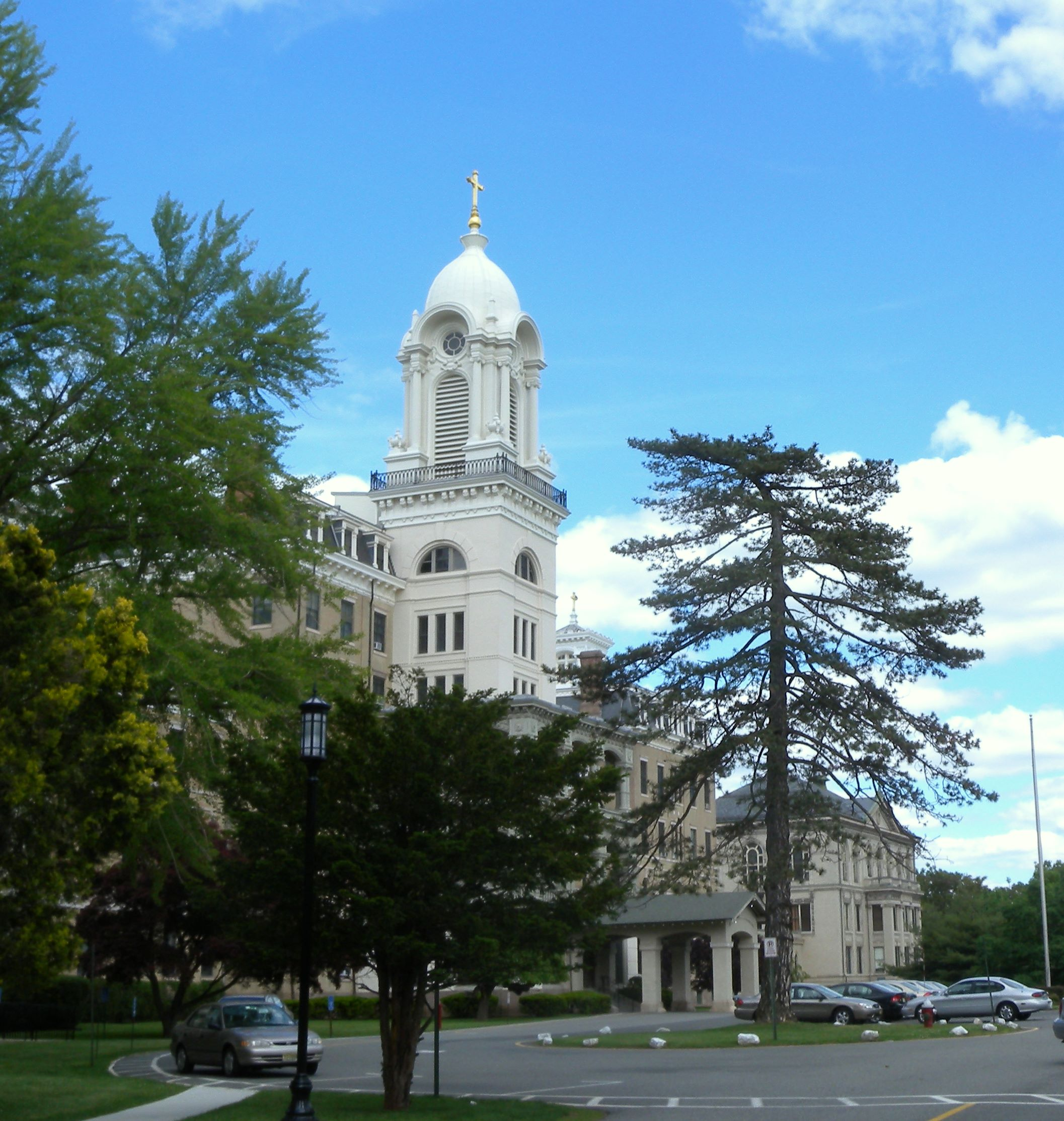
- Administration building

Location
- 2 Convent Road; Morristown (Convent Station), (Morris County), New Jersey 07961; United States; 40.77801°N 74.443388°W

Information
- Type: Private, young women only
- Motto: "Deus est Caritas" ("God is Love")
- Religious affiliation: Roman Catholic
- Patron saint: Saint Elizabeth Ann Seton
- Established: 1860
- Founder: Sisters of Charity
- NCES School ID: A1502315
- Principal: Beth Azar
- Faculty: 27.0 FTEs
- Grades: 9–12
- Enrollment: 208 (as of 2021–22)
- Average class size: 11
- Student to teacher ratio: 7.7:1
- Colors: Blue and Gold
- Athletics conference: Northwest Jersey Athletic Conference
- Mascot: Lizzie
- Nickname: AOSE, SEA, Stez, St. E's
- Team name: Panthers
- Accreditation: Middle States Association of Colleges and Schools
- Newspaper: AOSE Press
- Yearbook: The Beth
- Tuition: $25,150 (as of 2024–25 school year)
- College acceptance rate: 100%
- Slogan: Minds in wisdom, hearts in service, lives in faith
- Student Athletes: 75% of Student Body
- Website: www.aosenj.org

The Academy of Saint Elizabeth is a private college preparatory secondary school for young women located in Convent Station, New Jersey, United States. Established in 1860, the academy is the oldest secondary school for women in New Jersey. The school is within the Roman Catholic Diocese of Paterson but operates independently. The school has been accredited by the Middle States Association of Colleges and Schools Commissions on Elementary and Secondary Schools since 1928 and is accredited until January 2027.

As of the 2021–22 school year, the school had an enrollment of 208 students and 27.0 classroom teachers (on an FTE basis), for a student–teacher ratio of 7.7:1. The school's student body was 89.9% (187) White, 5.3% (11) Hispanic, 2.9% (6) two or more races and 1.9% (4) Black.

The community of Convent Station, which is adjacent to Morristown, was named for the railway station constructed in the 1870s to accommodate the 200-acre (0.81 km^{2}) complex of the Sisters of Charity of Saint Elizabeth that also includes Saint Elizabeth University and Saint Anne's Villa. The religious order was founded in 1859 in Newark, but in 1860 the motherhouse of the new religious order and the academy were established on the site.

The academy is a New Jersey Association of Independent Schools member.

== History ==
The Academy of Saint Elizabeth was founded at Morristown in 1860 by the Sisters of Charity. In 1859, Mother Xavier was commissioned by Bishop James Roosevelt Bayley to establish a school for young women in New Jersey, the first secondary school for young women in the state. The academy was established in Madison in September 1860 in a white-frame building. The renaming of Convent Station would come later when Mother Xavier provided funding in the 1870s for the Convent Station train station just outside the front gate of the school campus.

When the religious order founded the academy, they moved their motherhouse and convent from Newark onto a parcel that was located on the developing "Millionaires Row" that stretched from Loantaka Parkway to the center of Morristown, described as the "inland Newport" because of the numerous wealthy families who built grand homes along the route. In 1865, Morristown changed its incorporation to the new "town" category with a boundary that then excluded their large land holdings. Thirty years later, that boundary line officially delineated two governmental jurisdictions in 1895 when Morristown was formally set off from the rest of Morris Township.

The College of Saint Elizabeth (renamed in 2020 to Saint Elizabeth University) was founded in 1899 as part of the complex and, notably, it is the oldest women's college in New Jersey and one of the first Catholic colleges in the United States to award degrees to women. After the new boundary delineated the governmental jurisdiction of Morristown as a smaller area, a community eventually grew up between Morristown and Madison as a separate entity that eventually took its name from the railway station built on the extensive Saint Elizabeth's property.

The first students entered in 1860; the Registration Ledger of September 1 still resides in the principal's office, as do the records of every succeeding year. The new academy building was completed in 1865, and its first commencement exercises were held on the growing campus. By then, the school had gained a wide reputation for scholarship. It was recognized and accepted throughout the state as an institution of strong academics, culture, and Catholic learning for young women. The Sisters continued to acquire land whenever it became available, allowing for a campus that is today more than 200 acres (0.81 km^{2}) and is also the home of Saint Elizabeth University.

Initially, the academy served as a boarding school with students from many countries, but in the 1970s it became strictly a day school. The dormitories were converted into classrooms.

== Campus ==
Today, the campus covers more than 200 acres (81 ha) and is also the home of Saint Elizabeth University, founded in 1899. Covent Station is an approximately three-minute walk from the academy and many of the students commute via the NJ transit.

The Shakespeare Garden is located in front of the school. St. Elizabeth's recently held a contest to name the garden in the rear of the school and decided on the title, "Sea of Flowers."

The Sisters of Charity live adjacent to the school and frequently participate in activities with the students. The Holy Family Chapel is connected to the academy through the Mother House, and the students attend schoolwide mass there around once a month.

=== School schedule ===
The Academy employs a 6-day rotating schedule (A day, B day, C day, D day, E day, and F day). Schoolwide study periods and activity periods, respectively, are built into three days.

=== Academy life ===
The school day starts with homeroom. During homeroom, the students have time to finish homework, talk with friends and teachers, or eat. The academy offers breakfast every morning. Students wear a uniform consisting of a polo shirt, skirt or pants, socks, and shoes. After morning prayer and announcements, the young women attend morning classes.

After the morning classes, the students and staff come together again for lunch. There are new meals each day, plus everyday access to a salad bar, cookies, fruits, vegetables, and a wide selection of drinks. During the 45-minute luncheon break, students also have the option to meet with clubs. The academy offers more than 25 clubs for students. After lunch, students attend three of their four afternoon classes according to the rotating schedule. The school day ends with afternoon prayers.

=== Traditions ===
At the academy, many different traditions are important to the school. One tradition is Spirit Week. During Spirit Week, students show spirit toward their school by participating in different activities. Another tradition is the Mother-daughter tea. Mothers come with their daughters and all have tea, bond together, and socialize with others. The Alma Mater competition is a competition between all four grades to make videos, skits, or songs to show their love toward the academy and to sing the Alma Mater along with it. The Calendar Party is a tradition where each grade gets a certain season assigned to them and the students create a party to represent something that happens in that season. The academy also has an annual spring trip abroad. The final annual tradition, the Senior Fashion Show, takes place around the end of the year.

=== Transportation ===
Students who attend the academy come from many different municipalities. Some of the students take the train to school. The NJ Transit stop, Convent Station, is at the Academy's front gate. The academy provides bus transportation for students who live in Florham Park, Whippany, Hanover, and East Hanover.

== Athletics ==
The Academy of Saint Elizabeth Panthers compete in the Northwest Jersey Athletic Conference (NJAC), New Jersey Independent Schools Athletic Association (NJISAA), and North Jersey Interscholastic Girls Lacrosse League (NJIGLL). More than 75% of students at the academy partake in at least one interscholastic sport.

The academy offers a range of sports including soccer, volleyball, field hockey, tennis, equestrian sports, basketball, swimming, lacrosse, softball, and track and field.

The school participates as the host school/lead agency for a joint cooperative field hockey team with Morris Catholic High School, while Morris Catholic is the host school for joint cross-country running and ice hockey teams. All of these co-op programs operate under agreements scheduled to expire at the end of the 2023–24 school year.

The swimming team won the state Non-Public B state championship in 1999 and 2005. The 1999 team was awarded the Non-Public B title by the NJSIAA. In 2005, the team won the Non-Public B title with a 107–63 win in the finals against Bishop Eustace. The swim team won six straight Northern Hills Conference Championships (2002–2007) and came in second in the 2007 Morris County Championships.

The academy's basketball team faced Stuart Country Day School in the Prep B tournament finals in the 2017–2018 season.

The tennis team won a division title in the NJAC Independent Division in 2014.

The academy has an equestrian team, which practices through the fall and winter seasons. The team practices and competes at Lord Stirling Stables in Basking Ridge.

== Academics and curriculum ==
The academy requires four years each of mathematics, English, and religious studies. Other requirements are three years each of physical education and social studies. The social studies requirements are one year of world history and two years of U.S. history. The academy also requires three years of sciences; options include biology, chemistry, and physics. It also requires at least two years of the same foreign language (French, Latin, or Spanish), but three total years of a foreign language. At least one full year of art class, five semesters of fitness/wellness, and a full year of technology are required.

Sophomores, juniors, and seniors may take college preparatory, honors, or advanced placement courses, while freshmen are limited to college preparatory and honors courses. College courses include Bioethics and New Testament Honors. The Academy offers Advanced Placement (AP) courses: AP Calculus AB, AP Calculus BC, AP Latin, AP French Language and Culture, AP Spanish Language and Culture, AP English Literature and Composition, AP English Language and Composition, AP Human Geography, AP United States History, AP United States Government and Politics, AP Statistics, AP Biology, AP Chemistry, AP Environmental Science, AP Psychology.

== Scholarships ==
The Catherine C. Murphy Memorial Scholarship is granted annually to an incoming freshman who expresses a need for financial aid.

The Eileen M. O’Rourke Student Activities Scholarship Fund is granted to incoming freshmen who need financial aid and participate in community service.

The Alumni Legacy Scholarship is awarded to any freshman who has a relation to an alumna of the academy. The applicant must fulfill the normal application process and submit an essay explaining why being a legacy of the academy is important to her.

The Class of 1967 Scholarship is awarded to any academy junior who demonstrates academic excellence, completes the proper application form, and submits an essay by the deadline.

The Mother Xavier Merit Scholarship is awarded to ninth-grade students who achieved academic excellence in middle school and have moral ethics that agree with the academy's mission.

== Clubs and extracurriculars ==
Student Ambassadors, SEAsters Baked Goods, Book Club, Bridges Outreach, Business and Entrepreneurship Club, the Pollinators Committee, French Club, Spanish Club, Latin Club, National Honor Society, AOSE Press (the online school newspaper), Senior Prom Committee, Student Council, Yearbook Committee, Toward Boundless Charity (TBC), and Women's Empowerment Club. Academy students perform a spring musical each year.

The academy offers an annual trip to a different destination during spring break. Past trips include Greece (2024), Costa Rica (2023), Australia and New Zealand (2018), Hawaii (2017), and Italy and France (2016). Each spring, the academy hosts an art show to display the work of students who have taken art classes throughout the year.

The academy offers academic summer programs for both incoming freshmen and current students, including Foundations of English and Mathematics, SAT Preparation classes, and art classes such as drawing, painting, and introduction to ceramics. The academy also offers a co-ed Forensic Science summer camp for grades 6–8.

== Notable alumni ==
- Ann McLaughlin Korologos (1941–2023), corporate executive who served as the 19th United States secretary of labor, from 1987 to 1989
- Anne Ryan (1889–1954), abstract expressionist artist associated with the New York School
- UmaSofia Srivastava, beauty pageant titleholder who won Miss Teen USA 2023
