= Secretary of the State of Connecticut =

US constitutional officer

- Seal of the Secretary of the State

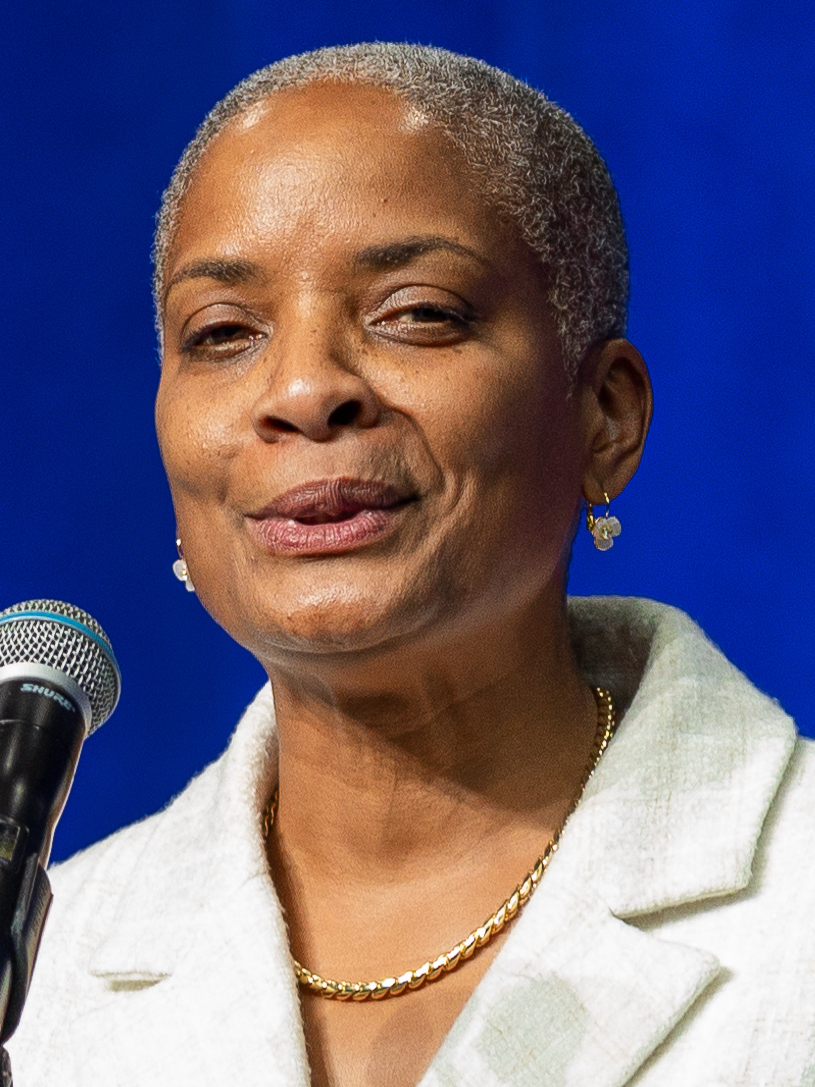
- Incumbent; Stephanie Thomas since January 4, 2023
- Type: Secretary
- Term length: 4 years
- Formation: 1639
- First holder: Edward Hopkins
- Website: Official homepage of the Connecticut Secretary of the State

The secretary of the state of Connecticut is one of the constitutional officers of the U.S. state of Connecticut. (The definite article is part of the legal job title.) It is an elected position in the state government and has a term length of four years.

The current secretary of the state is Stephanie Thomas, a Democrat who has held the office since January 2023 after defeating Republican opponent Dominic Rapini in the 2022 general election.

The Secretary of the State's Office is composed of two divisions:

- The Legislation and Elections Administration Division, which administers elections and ensures compliance with state and federal election laws. This division is also responsible for maintaining governmental records, administering the Seal of Connecticut, and licensing notaries public.
- The Commercial Recording Division, which charters corporations and other business entities, registers trademarks, service marks, and liens under the Uniform Commercial Code, and issues apostilles.

== List of secretaries of state of Connecticut ==
=== Before statehood ===
Name	Town	Term of service	Years of service
Edward Hopkins	Hartford	1639–1641	2 yrs.
Thomas Welles	Hartford	1641–1648	7 yrs.
John Cullick	Hartford, O	1648–1658	10 yrs.
Daniel Clark	Windsor, O	1658–1664, 1665–1667	8 yrs.
John Allyn	Hartford, O	1664–1665, 1667–1696	30 yrs.
Eleazer Kimberly	Glastonbury, O	1696–1709	13 yrs.
William Whiting	Hartford, O	1709	3 mo.
Caleb Stanly	Hartford, O	1709–1712	3 yrs.
Richard Lord	Hartford, O	1712	17 d.
Hezekiah Wyllys	Hartford, O	1712–1735	23 yrs.
George Wyllys	Hartford, O	1735–1796	61 yrs.

=== Since statehood ===
Connecticut ratified the United States Constitution and gained statehood in 1788.

Image	Name	Town	Political party	Term of service
	George Wyllys	Hartford		1788–1796
	Samuel Wyllys	Hartford		1796–1810
	Thomas Day	Hartford		1810–1835
	Royal Ralph Hinman	Southbury		1835–1842
	Noah A. Phelps	Hartford		1842–1844
	Daniel P. Tyler	Pomfret		1844–1846
	Charles W. Bradley	Hartford		1846–1847
	John B. Robertson	New Haven		1847–1849
	Roger H. Mills	N. Hartford	Whig	1849–1850
	Hiram Weed	Danbury	Democratic	1850
	John P. C. Mather	New London	Democratic	1850–1854
	Oliver H. Perry	Fairfield	Whig	1854–1855
	Nehemiah D. Sperry	New Haven	American	1855–1857
	Orville H. Platt	Meriden	American, Republican	1857–1858
	John Boyd	Winchester	Republican	1858–1861
	James Hammond Trumbull	Hartford	Republican	1861–1866
	Leverett E. Pease	Somers	Union	1866–1869
	Hiram Appelman	Groton	Republican	1869–1870
	Thomas M. Waller	New London	Democratic	1870–1871
	Hiram Appelman	Groton	Republican	1871–1873
	D. W. Edgecomb	Fairfield	Republican	1873
	Marvin H. Sanger	Canterbury	Democratic	1873–1877
	Dwight Morris	Bridgeport	Democratic	1877-–1879
	David Torrance	Derby	Republican	1879–1881
	Charles E. Searls	Thompson	Republican	1881–1883
	D. Ward Northrop	Middletown	Democratic	1883–1885
	Charles A. Russell	Killingly	Republican	1885–1887
	Leverett M. Hubbard	Wallingford	Republican	1887–1889
	R. Jay Walsh	Greenwich	Republican	1889–1893
	John J. Phelan	Bridgeport	Democratic	1893–1895
	William C. Mowry	Norwich	Republican	1895–1897
	Charles Phelps	Rockville	Republican	1897–1899
	Huber Clark	Willimantic	Republican	1899–1901
	Charles G. R. Vinal	Middletown	Republican	1901–1905
	Theodore Bodenwein	New London	Republican	1905–1909
	Matthew H. Rogers	Bridgeport	Republican	1909–1913
	Albert Phillips	Stamford	Democratic	1913–1915
	Charles D. Burnes	Greenwich	Republican	1915–1917
	Frederick L. Perry	New Haven	Republican	1917–1921
	Donald J. Warner	Salisbury	Republican	1921–1923
	Francis A. Pallotti	Hartford	Republican	1923–1929
	William L. Higgins	Coventry	Republican	1929–1933
	John A. Danaher	Hartford	Republican	1933–1935
	C. John Satti	New London	Democratic	1935–1939
	Sara B. Crawford	Westport	Republican	1939–1941
	Chase G. Woodhouse	New London	Democratic	1941–1943
	Frances B. Redick	Newington	Republican	1943–1945
	Charles J. Prestia	New Britain	Democratic	1945–1947
	Frances B. Redick	Newington	Republican	1947–1949
	Winifred McDonald	Waterbury	Democratic	1949–1951
	Alice Leopold	Weston	Republican	1951–1953
	Charles B. Keats	Bridgeport	Republican	1953–1955
	Mildred P. Allen	Hartford	Republican	1955–1959
	Ella Grasso	Windsor Locks	Democratic	1959–1971
	Gloria Schaffer	Woodbridge	Democratic	1971–1978
	Henry S. Cohn	West Hartford	Democratic	1978–1979
	Barbara B. Kennelly	Hartford	Democratic	1979–1982
	Maura Melley	Wethersfield	Democratic	1982–1983
	Julia Tashjian	Windsor	Democratic	1983–1991
	Pauline R. Kezer	Plainville	Republican	1991–1995
	Miles S. Rapoport	West Hartford	Democratic	1995–1999
	Susan Bysiewicz	Middletown	Democratic	1999–2011
	Denise Merrill	Mansfield	Democratic	2011–2022
	Mark Kohler	North Haven	Democratic	2022–2023
	Stephanie Thomas	Norwalk	Democratic	2023–present

== See also ==
- Attorney General of Connecticut
