= Mildred P. Allen =

American politician (1907–1961)

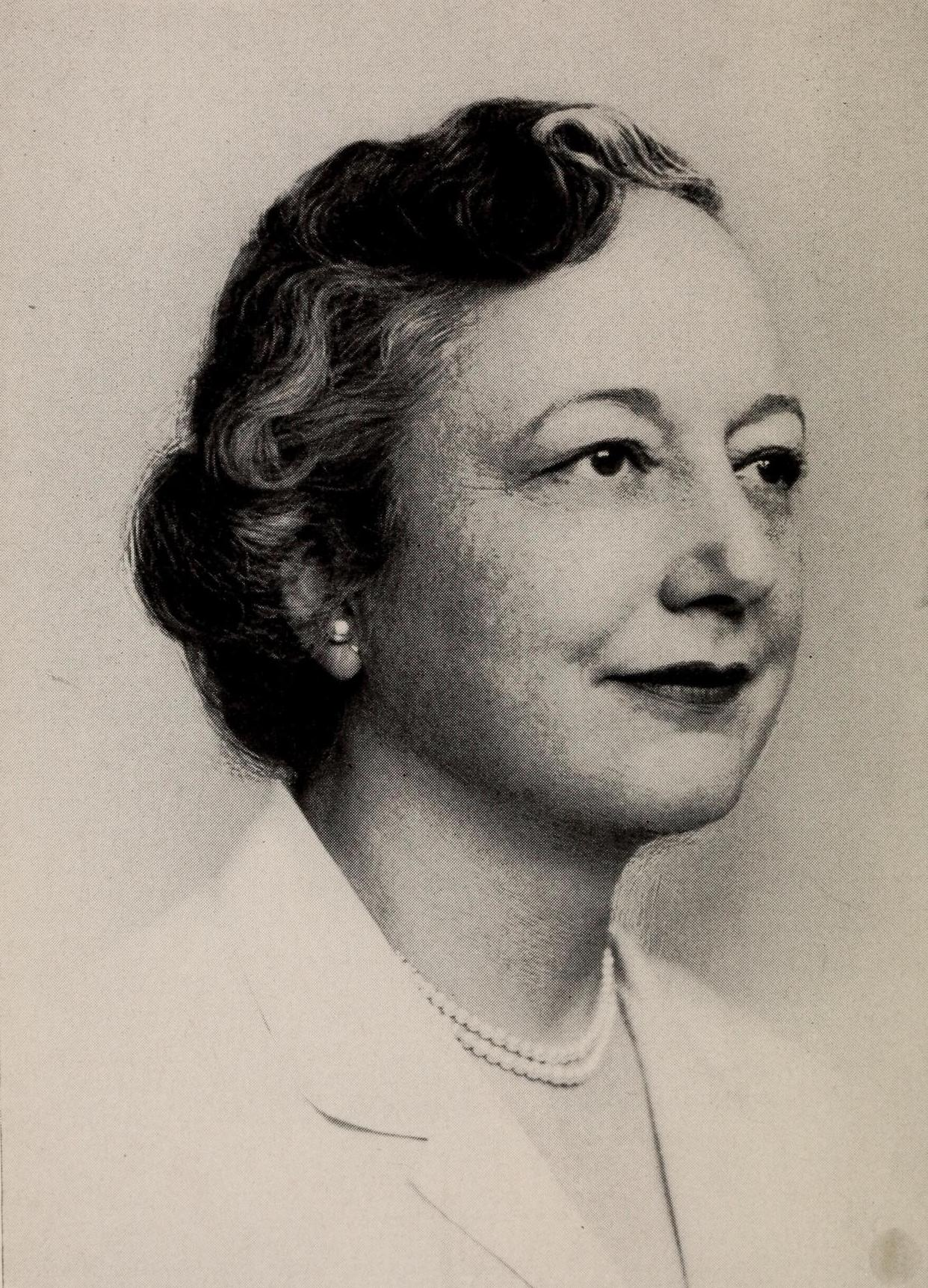
- Allen in 1957

63rd Secretary of the State of Connecticut
- In office 1955–1959
- Governor: Abraham Ribicoff
- Preceded by: Charles B. Keats
- Succeeded by: Ella Grasso

Personal details
- Born: November 7, 1907 Hartford, Connecticut, US
- Died: September 23, 1961 (aged 53) Milton, Massachusetts, US
- Party: Republican
- Occupation: Politician

Mildred Pomeranz Allen (November 7, 1907 – September 23, 1961) was an American politician. A Republican from Hartford, Connecticut, she was the first Jewish woman elected as Secretary of the State of Connecticut (1955–1959).

== Personal life ==
Mildred Pomeranz was born and raised in Hartford, the daughter of Morris and Anna (Landsberg) Pomeranz. Her mother emigrated from Russia before 1900. Mildred had two brothers.

On November 7, 1935 Pomeranz married Edward N. Allen (1891–1972), who was to take over as president of the family Sage-Allen department store in 1941 after his mother's death. They had two children, Normand Francis Allen II (1935–present) and Mary.

== Music ==
Mildred played and taught piano as a young woman; she was a student of R. Augustus Lawson, an African-American concert pianist who became a dean at the Hartt College of Music. As late as 1950 she appeared as a pianist with an ensemble from the Hartford Symphony Orchestra. She was also active in various Hartford-area musical organizations.

== Politics ==
Mildred Allen's husband Edward was the mayor of Hartford from 1947 to 1948 and served as Lieutenant Governor of Connecticut from 1951 to 1955. Mildred, who had been active in civic organizations and Republican women's groups, ran for Secretary of State in 1954 and won by 14,309 votes—the largest margin of any state-level official in that year.

She was also a delegate to the 1956 Republican National Convention from Connecticut.

== Awards and legacy ==
Allen received a distinguished citizen award from the Order Sons of Italy in America in 1958 and an honorary doctorate of laws from the University of Hartford in 1960.

Mildred and Edward Allen were among the "Founders" of the University of Hartford (and Edward served as a trustee); the university was created by the merger of Hillyer College, the Hartford Art School, and The Hartt School in 1957. After Mildred's death more than $40,000 was raised in her memory for the Hartt music library and in 1963 it was dedicated as the Mildred P. Allen Memorial Library.

Political offices
Preceded by Charles B. Keats	Secretary of State of Connecticut; 1955-1959	Succeeded by Ella Grasso
