= Dan Clark (motivational speaker) =

American motivational speaker (born 1955)

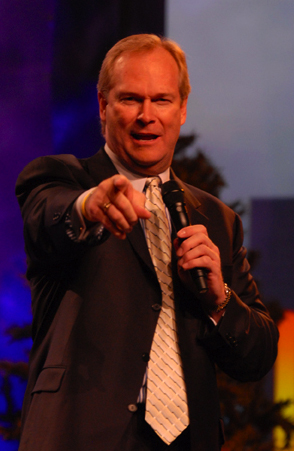
- Dan Clark as the closing main platform speaker at Million Dollar Round Table.
- Born: March 14, 1955 (age 71); Mesa, Arizona
- Occupations: Motivational speaker; author; CEO
- Known for: Chicken Soup for the Soul, Public Speaking

Dan Clark (born March 14, 1955) is an American professional motivational speaker, author, and CEO of Clark Success Systems. Clark is also on the International Board of Governors of Operation Smile and on the National Advisory Board for Operation Kids. Clark is the author of twenty-one books.

== Early life and education ==
Dan Clark was born in Mesa Arizona on March 14, 1955. Clark accepted a scholarship in football and baseball to the University of Utah where he majored in psychology. During a tackling drill Clark cracked the 7th vertebra in his neck and severed the axillary nerve in his right shoulder. Clark recovered full function in a couple of years and was invited to speak to local high school kids about his recovery. From there Clark was invited to speak for Nancy Reagan's "Just Say No" campaign.

== Career ==
In 1980, Clark acted as a consultant at Clark Financial Real Estate Development Corporation. In 1983, he started his own company, Dan Clark and Associates, where he was CEO.

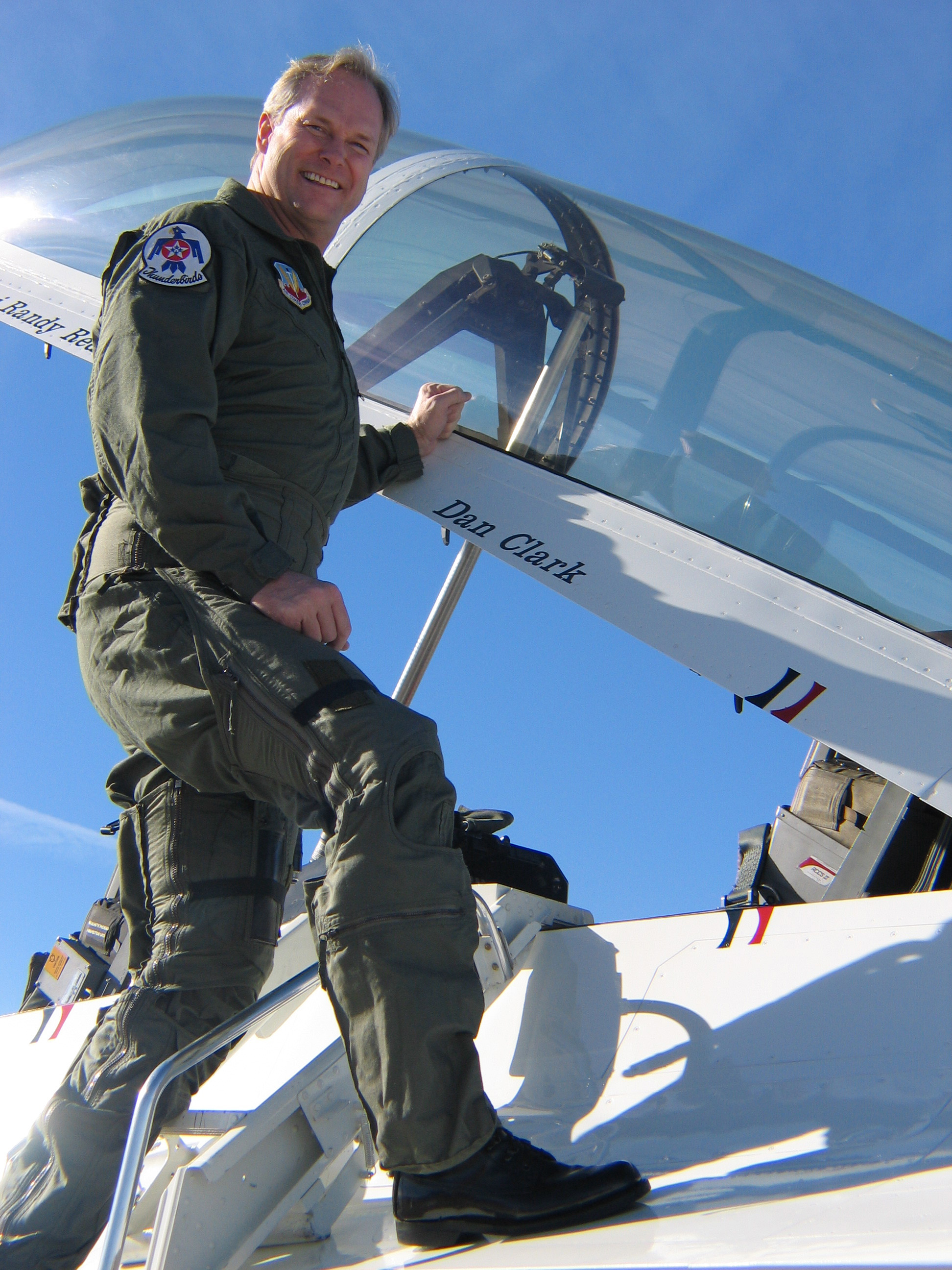
Clark before a flight with the U.S. Air Force Thunderbirds.

In 1991 and 1992, Clark delivered four speeches in the former Soviet Union, where one of his speeches aired live on Moscow One Television, broadcast to all 15 independent Russian states. Clark was also the general session keynote speaker at the United Nations World Congress in Hamburg, Germany, in 1992.

In 2005, Clark traveled to Iraq and Afghanistan and spoke 23 times on 10 bases plus on the USS Harry S. Truman (CVN-75) aircraft carrier.

== Writing career ==
In 1983, Clark published his first book, Getting High - How To Really Do It. His third book, One Minute Messages, consisted of 250 of his own short stories of 24 lines each. Clark would give copies away to people he met on the condition that they promised to buy their own copy to give to someone. The book sold over 150,000 copies.

Clark was approached by Mark Hansen and Jack Canfield, the co-creators of the Chicken Soup for the Soul series, about how he marketed One Minute Messages. Clark became a primary contributing author to the Chicken Soup for the Soul series in 1993, contributing as an author and editor to its first 12 volumes. Clark's Chicken Soup for the College Soul was number two on the New York Times bestseller list in 1999, with over 1,000,000 copies in print. One of Clark's short stories, Puppies for Sale, was turned into a short film starring Jack Lemmon. As of February 2006, Clark has sold over 100,000 copies of Puppies for Sale at his speaking engagements.

== Works ==
- Getting High - How to Really Do It (1983) 5 reprintings
- The Missing Link (1985)
- One Minute Messages (1986) 5 reprintings
- Weathering the Storm (1989)
- Puppies for Sale and Other Inspirational Tales (1997)
- The Best in Customer Service (1996)
- The Best in Leadership (1996)
- Chicken Soup for the College Soul (1999) co-author
- Puppies for Sale Children's Classic (1999)
- The Most Popular Stories by Dan Clark in Chicken Soup for the Soul (2004)
- Forgotten Fundamentals: The Answers are in the Box (2007)
- The Funniest Things Happen When You Look for Laughs (2007)
- Lyrical Poetry (2007)
- Rainbows Follow Rain (2007)
- The Thrill of Teaching (2007)
- Privilege of the Platform: The Art and Science of Public Speaking (2007)
- Wisdom, Rhymes and Wizardry (2007)
- Soul Food Volume I (2008)
- Soul Food Volume II (2008)
- The Art of Significance: Achieving the Level Beyond Success (2013)
