= Political party strength in New Mexico =

Politics in the US state of New Mexico

Political party strength in New Mexico has been divided between the Democratic Party and the Republican Party.

Since the 2008 presidential election the state has been considered a safe blue state.

== Partisan identification in the electorate ==
Party registration as of April 30, 2026
Party	Number of voters	Fraction
Democratic	573,297	40.3%
Republican	443,220	31.2%
Independent / other	406,027	28.6%
Total	1,422,544	100.0%

As of July 2025, New Mexico's registered voters include 570,873 Democrats (42.1%), 436,647 Republicans (32.2%), 26,864 "Other" (2%), and 320,988 Unaffiliated (23.7%).

== Contents ==
The following table indicates the party of elected officials in the U.S. state of New Mexico.

- Governor
- Lieutenant Governor
- Secretary of state
- Attorney general
- State auditor
- State treasurer
- Commissioner of public lands

The table also indicates the historical party composition in the:

- State Senate
- State House of Representatives
- State delegation to the U.S. Senate
- State delegation to the U.S. House of Representatives

For years in which a presidential election was held, the table indicates which party's nominees received the state's electoral votes.

== Pre-statehood (1846–1911) ==
Year	Executive offices					Territorial Legislature		United States Congress
Year	Governor	Secretary of Terr.	Auditor	Treasurer	Comm. of Pub. Lands	Senate	House	Delegate
1846	Charles Bent (Note: Governor of New Mexico Territory.)							
1847	none (Note: Stephen W. Kearny declared New Mexico a territory in 1846 and installed Charles Bent as governor. Congress revoked Kearny's declaration in 1847, and thus New Mexico had no governor from 1847 until 1851.)							
...	none							
1850	none							
1851	James Calhoun (W) (Note: Resigned in 1852 to return to his native state of Georgia)							Richard Hanson Weightman (D) (Note: Delegate from New Mexico Territory.)
1852	William Carr Lane (W)							Richard Hanson Weightman (D)
1853	David Meriwether (D)							José Manuel Gallegos (D)
1854	David Meriwether (D)							José Manuel Gallegos (D)
1855	David Meriwether (D)							José Manuel Gallegos (D)
1856	David Meriwether (D)							Miguel Antonio Otero (D)
1857	Abraham Rencher (D)							Miguel Antonio Otero (D)
...	Abraham Rencher (D)							Miguel Antonio Otero (D)
1860	Abraham Rencher (D)							Miguel Antonio Otero (D)
1861	Henry Connelly (R) (Note: The territory broke into two and then three during Connelly's tenure due to the American Civil War and administrative problems.)							John Sebrie Watts (R)
1862	Henry Connelly (R)							John Sebrie Watts (R)
1863	Henry Connelly (R)							Francisco Perea (R)
1864	Henry Connelly (R)							Francisco Perea (R)
1865	Henry Connelly (R)							José Francisco Chaves (R)
1866	Robert Byington Mitchell (D)							José Francisco Chaves (R)
1867	Robert Byington Mitchell (D)							Charles P. Clever (D)
1868	Robert Byington Mitchell (D)							Charles P. Clever (D)
1869	William A. Pile (R)							José Francisco Chaves (R)
1870	William A. Pile (R)							José Francisco Chaves (R)
1871	Marsh Giddings (R)							José Manuel Gallegos (D)
1872	Marsh Giddings (R)							José Manuel Gallegos (D)
1873	Marsh Giddings (R)							Stephen B. Elkins (R)
1874	Marsh Giddings (R)							Stephen B. Elkins (R)
1875	Samuel Beach Axtell (R) (Note: Suspended by the United States Secretary of the Interior for misconduct in 1878.)							Stephen B. Elkins (R)
1876	Samuel Beach Axtell (R)							Stephen B. Elkins (R)
1877	Samuel Beach Axtell (R)							Trinidad Romero (R)
1878	Lew Wallace (R)							Trinidad Romero (R)
1879	Lew Wallace (R)							Mariano S. Otero (R)
1880	Lew Wallace (R)							Mariano S. Otero (R)
1881	Lionel Allen Sheldon (R)							Tranquilino Luna (R)
1882	Lionel Allen Sheldon (R)							Tranquilino Luna (R)
1883	Lionel Allen Sheldon (R)							Francisco Antonio Manzanares (D)
1884	Lionel Allen Sheldon (R)							Francisco Antonio Manzanares (D)
1885	Edmund G. Ross (D)							Antonio Joseph (D)
...	Edmund G. Ross (D)							Antonio Joseph (D)
1888	Edmund G. Ross (D)							Antonio Joseph (D)
1889	L. Bradford Prince (R)							Antonio Joseph (D)
...	L. Bradford Prince (R)							Antonio Joseph (D)
1892	L. Bradford Prince (R)							Antonio Joseph (D)
1893	William Taylor Thornton (D)							Antonio Joseph (D)
1894	William Taylor Thornton (D)							Antonio Joseph (D)
1895	William Taylor Thornton (D)		Marcelino Garcia	Samuel Eldodt				Thomas B. Catron (R)
1896	William Taylor Thornton (D)		Marcelino Garcia	Samuel Eldodt				Thomas B. Catron (R)
1897	Miguel Antonio Otero (R)	George H. Wallace	Marcelino Garcia	Samuel Eldodt				Harvey Butler Fergusson (D)
1898	Miguel Antonio Otero (R)	George H. Wallace	Marcelino Garcia	Samuel Eldodt				Harvey Butler Fergusson (D)
1899	Miguel Antonio Otero (R)	George H. Wallace	Luis M. Ortiz	Samuel Eldodt	Alpheus Keen			Pedro Perea (R)
1900	Miguel Antonio Otero (R)	George H. Wallace	Luis M. Ortiz	Samuel Eldodt	Alpheus Keen			Pedro Perea (R)
1901	Miguel Antonio Otero (R)	James W. Raynolds	William G. Sargent	John H. Vaughan	Alpheus Keen			Bernard Shandon Rodey (R)
...	Miguel Antonio Otero (R)	James W. Raynolds		John H. Vaughan	Alpheus Keen			Bernard Shandon Rodey (R)
1904	Miguel Antonio Otero (R)	James W. Raynolds		John H. Vaughan	Alpheus Keen			Bernard Shandon Rodey (R)
1905	Miguel Antonio Otero (R)	James W. Raynolds		John H. Vaughan	Alpheus Keen			William Henry Andrews (R)
1906	Herbert James Hagerman (R)	James W. Raynolds		John H. Vaughan	Alpheus Keen			William Henry Andrews (R)
1907	George Curry (R) (Note: Resigned in 1910 to become a framer in the New Mexico Constitutional Convention.)				Alpheus Keen			William Henry Andrews (R)
1908	George Curry (R)							William Henry Andrews (R)
1909	George Curry (R)							William Henry Andrews (R)
1910	William J. Mills (R)							William Henry Andrews (R)
1911	William J. Mills (R)							William Henry Andrews (R)

== Statehood (1911–present) ==
Year	Executive offices							State Legislature		United States Congress			Electoral votes
Year	Governor	Lieutenant Governor	Secretary of State	Attorney General	Auditor	Treasurer	Comm. of Pub. Lands	Senate	House	Senator (Class I)	Senator (Class II)	House	Electoral votes
1912	William C. McDonald (D)	Ezequiel C. De Baca (D)	Antonio J. Lucero (D)	Frank C. Clancy (R)	William G. Sargent (R)	Owen N. Marron (D)	Robert P. Ervien (R) (Note: Died in office.)	16R, 7D, 1Prog	30R, 16D, 3Prog	Thomas B. Catron (R)	Albert B. Fall (R) (Note: Resigned on March 4, 1921 to take office as U.S. Secretary of the Interior.)	1R, 1D	Wilson/ Marshall (D) ✓
1913	William C. McDonald (D)	Ezequiel C. De Baca (D)	Antonio J. Lucero (D)	Frank C. Clancy (R)	William G. Sargent (R)	Owen N. Marron (D)	Robert P. Ervien (R)	16R, 7D, 1Prog	30R, 16D, 3Prog	Thomas B. Catron (R)	Albert B. Fall (R)	Harvey Butler; Fergusson (D)	Wilson/ Marshall (D) ✓
1914	William C. McDonald (D)	Ezequiel C. De Baca (D)	Antonio J. Lucero (D)	Frank C. Clancy (R)	William G. Sargent (R)	Owen N. Marron (D)	Robert P. Ervien (R)	16R, 7D, 1Prog	30R, 16D, 3Prog	Thomas B. Catron (R)	Albert B. Fall (R)	Harvey Butler; Fergusson (D)	Wilson/ Marshall (D) ✓
1915	William C. McDonald (D)	Ezequiel C. De Baca (D)	Antonio J. Lucero (D)	Frank C. Clancy (R)	William G. Sargent (R)	Owen N. Marron (D)	Robert P. Ervien (R)	16R, 7D, 1Prog	33R, 14D, 2Prog	Thomas B. Catron (R)	Albert B. Fall (R)	Benigno C. Hernández (R)	Wilson/ Marshall (D) ✓
1916	William C. McDonald (D)	Ezequiel C. De Baca (D)	Antonio J. Lucero (D)	Frank C. Clancy (R)	William G. Sargent (R)	Owen N. Marron (D)	Robert P. Ervien (R)	16R, 7D, 1Prog	33R, 14D, 2Prog	Thomas B. Catron (R)	Albert B. Fall (R)	Benigno C. Hernández (R)	Wilson/ Marshall (D) ✓
1917	Ezequiel C. De Baca (D)	Washington E. Lindsey (R)	Manuel Martínez (R)	Harry L. Patton (D)	William G. Sargent (R)	H. L. Hall (D)	Robert P. Ervien (R)	14R, 10D	30R, 19D	Thomas B. Catron (R)	Albert B. Fall (R)	William B. Walton (D)	Wilson/ Marshall (D) ✓
1917	Washington E. Lindsey (R) (Note: As lieutenant governor, filled unexpired term.)	vacant	Manuel Martínez (R)	Harry L. Patton (D)	William G. Sargent (R)	H. L. Hall (D)	Fred Muller (R) (Note: Initially appointed to fill vacancy.)	14R, 10D	30R, 19D	Andrieus A. Jones (D)	Albert B. Fall (R)	William B. Walton (D)	Wilson/ Marshall (D) ✓
1918	Washington E. Lindsey (R)	vacant	Manuel Martínez (R)	Harry L. Patton (D)	William G. Sargent (R)	H. L. Hall (D)	Fred Muller (R)	14R, 10D	30R, 19D	Andrieus A. Jones (D)	Albert B. Fall (R)	William B. Walton (D)	Wilson/ Marshall (D) ✓
1919	Octavio Larrazolo (R)	Benjamin F. Pankey (R)	Manuel Martínez (R)	Oscar O. Askren (D)	Edward G. Sargent (R)	Charles U. Strong (R) (Note: Resigned.)	Nelson A. Field (R)	14R, 10D	30R, 19D	Andrieus A. Jones (D)	Albert B. Fall (R)	Benigno C. Hernández (R)	Wilson/ Marshall (D) ✓
1920	Octavio Larrazolo (R)	Benjamin F. Pankey (R)	Manuel Martínez (R)	Oscar O. Askren (D)	Edward G. Sargent (R)	Charles U. Strong (R)	Nelson A. Field (R)	14R, 10D	30R, 19D	Andrieus A. Jones (D)	Albert B. Fall (R)	Benigno C. Hernández (R)	Harding/ Coolidge (R) ✓
1921	Merritt C. Mechem (R)	William H. Duckworth (R)	Manuel Martínez (R)	Harry S. Bowman (D)	Edward L. Safford (R)	Charles U. Strong (R)	Nelson A. Field (R)	14R, 10D	30R, 19D	Andrieus A. Jones (D)	Holm O. Bursum (R)	Néstor Montoya (R)	Harding/ Coolidge (R) ✓
1922	Merritt C. Mechem (R)	William H. Duckworth (R)	Manuel Martínez (R)	Harry S. Bowman (D)	Edward L. Safford (R)	O. A. Matson (R)	Nelson A. Field (R)	14R, 10D	30R, 19D	Andrieus A. Jones (D)	Holm O. Bursum (R)	Néstor Montoya (R)	Harding/ Coolidge (R) ✓
1923	James F. Hinkle (D)	José A. Baca (D)	Soledad Chacón (D)	Milton J. Helmick (D)	Juan N. Vigil (D)	John W. Corbin (D)	Justiniano Baca (D)	14R, 10D	33D, 16R	Andrieus A. Jones (D)	Holm O. Bursum (R)	John Morrow (D)	Harding/ Coolidge (R) ✓
1923	James F. Hinkle (D)	José A. Baca (D)	Soledad Chacón (D)	Milton J. Helmick (D)	Juan N. Vigil (D)	Warren R. Graham Sr. (D)	Justiniano Baca (D)	14R, 10D	33D, 16R	Andrieus A. Jones (D)	Holm O. Bursum (R)	John Morrow (D)	Harding/ Coolidge (R) ✓
1924	James F. Hinkle (D)	José A. Baca (D)	Soledad Chacón (D)	Milton J. Helmick (D)	Juan N. Vigil (D)	Warren R. Graham Sr. (D)	Justiniano Baca (D)	14R, 10D	33D, 16R	Andrieus A. Jones (D)	Holm O. Bursum (R)	John Morrow (D)	Coolidge/ Dawes (R) ✓
1925	Arthur T. Hannett (D)	Edward G. Sargent (R)	Soledad Chacón (D)	John W. Armstrong (D)	Juan N. Vigil (D)	Warren R. Graham Sr. (D)	Edwin B. Swope (D)	13R, 11D	28D, 21R	Andrieus A. Jones (D)	Sam G. Bratton (D) (Note: Resigned on June 24, 1933 to take seat as judge on the U.S. Court of Appeals for the Tenth Circuit.)	John Morrow (D)	Coolidge/ Dawes (R) ✓
1926	Arthur T. Hannett (D)	Edward G. Sargent (R)	Soledad Chacón (D)	Fred E. Wilson (D)	Juan N. Vigil (D)	Warren R. Graham Sr. (D)	Edwin B. Swope (D)	13R, 11D	28D, 21R	Andrieus A. Jones (D)	Sam G. Bratton (D)	John Morrow (D)	Coolidge/ Dawes (R) ✓
1927	Richard C. Dillon (R)	Edward G. Sargent (R)	Jennie Fortune (D)	Robert C. Dow (D)	Miguel A. Otero III (R)	Warren R. Graham Sr. (D)	Benjamin F. Pankey (R)	13R, 11D	28D, 21R	Andrieus A. Jones (D)	Sam G. Bratton (D)	John Morrow (D)	Coolidge/ Dawes (R) ✓
1927	Richard C. Dillon (R)	Edward G. Sargent (R)	Jennie Fortune (D)	Robert C. Dow (D)	Miguel A. Otero III (R)	Warren R. Graham Sr. (D)	Benjamin F. Pankey (R)	13R, 11D	28D, 21R	Bronson M. Cutting (R)	Sam G. Bratton (D)	John Morrow (D)	Coolidge/ Dawes (R) ✓
1928	Richard C. Dillon (R)	Edward G. Sargent (R)	Jennie Fortune (D)	Robert C. Dow (D)	Miguel A. Otero III (R)	Warren R. Graham Sr. (D)	Benjamin F. Pankey (R)	13R, 11D	28D, 21R	Bronson M. Cutting (R)	Sam G. Bratton (D)	John Morrow (D)	Coolidge/ Dawes (R) ✓
1928	Richard C. Dillon (R)	Edward G. Sargent (R)	Jennie Fortune (D)	Robert C. Dow (D)	Miguel A. Otero III (R)	Warren R. Graham Sr. (D)	Benjamin F. Pankey (R)	13R, 11D	28D, 21R	Octavio Larrazolo (R)	Sam G. Bratton (D)	John Morrow (D)	Hoover/ Curtis (R) ✓
1929	Richard C. Dillon (R)	Hugh B. Woodward (R)	E. A. Perrault (R)	Miguel A. Otero III (R)	Victoriano Ulibarrí (R)	Emerson Watts (R)	Benjamin F. Pankey (R)	18R, 6D	37R, 12D	Octavio Larrazolo (R)	Sam G. Bratton (D)	Albert G. Simms (R)	Hoover/ Curtis (R) ✓
1929	Richard C. Dillon (R)	vacant	E. A. Perrault (R)	Miguel A. Otero III (R)	Victoriano Ulibarrí (R)	Emerson Watts (R)	Austin D. Crile (R)	18R, 6D	37R, 12D	Bronson M. Cutting (R)	Sam G. Bratton (D)	Albert G. Simms (R)	Hoover/ Curtis (R) ✓
1930	Richard C. Dillon (R)	vacant	E. A. Perrault (R)	Miguel A. Otero III (R)	Victoriano Ulibarrí (R)	Emerson Watts (R)	Austin D. Crile (R)	18R, 6D	37R, 12D	Bronson M. Cutting (R)	Sam G. Bratton (D)	Albert G. Simms (R)	Hoover/ Curtis (R) ✓
1931	Arthur Seligman (D)	Andrew W. Hockenhull (D)	Marguerite P. Baca (D)	Ernest K. Neumann (D)	Arsenio Velarde (D)	Warren R. Graham Sr. (D)	James F. Hinkle (D)	16R, 8D	28D, 21R	Bronson M. Cutting (R)	Sam G. Bratton (D)	Dennis Chávez (D)	Hoover/ Curtis (R) ✓
1932	Arthur Seligman (D)	Andrew W. Hockenhull (D)	Marguerite P. Baca (D)	Ernest K. Neumann (D)	Arsenio Velarde (D)	Warren R. Graham Sr. (D)	James F. Hinkle (D)	16R, 8D	28D, 21R	Bronson M. Cutting (R)	Sam G. Bratton (D)	Dennis Chávez (D)	Roosevelt/ Garner (D) ✓
1933	Arthur Seligman (D)	Andrew W. Hockenhull (D)	Marguerite P. Baca (D)	Ernest K. Neumann (D)	Arsenio Velarde (D)	Clinton Anderson (D)	Frank Vesely (D)	20D, 4R	41D, 8R	Bronson M. Cutting (R)	Sam G. Bratton (D)	Dennis Chávez (D)	Roosevelt/ Garner (D) ✓
1933	Andrew W. Hockenhull (D)	vacant	Marguerite P. Baca (D)	Ernest K. Neumann (D)	Arsenio Velarde (D)	Clinton Anderson (D)	Frank Vesely (D)	20D, 4R	41D, 8R	Bronson M. Cutting (R)	Carl Hatch (D)	Dennis Chávez (D)	Roosevelt/ Garner (D) ✓
1934	Andrew W. Hockenhull (D)	vacant	Marguerite P. Baca (D)	Ernest K. Neumann (D)	Arsenio Velarde (D)	Clinton Anderson (D)	Frank Vesely (D)	20D, 4R	42D, 7R	Bronson M. Cutting (R)	Carl Hatch (D)	Dennis Chávez (D)	Roosevelt/ Garner (D) ✓
1935	Clyde Tingley (D)	Louis Cabeza de Baca (D)	Elizabeth F. Gonzales (D)	Frank H. Patton (D)	José O. García (D)	James J. Connelly (D)	Frank Vesely (D)	18D, 6R	37D, 12R	Bronson M. Cutting (R)	Carl Hatch (D)	John J. Dempsey (D)	Roosevelt/ Garner (D) ✓
1935	Clyde Tingley (D)	Louis Cabeza de Baca (D)	Elizabeth F. Gonzales (D)	Frank H. Patton (D)	José O. García (D)	James J. Connelly (D)	Frank Vesely (D)	18D, 6R	37D, 12R	Dennis Chávez (D)	Carl Hatch (D)	John J. Dempsey (D)	Roosevelt/ Garner (D) ✓
1936	Clyde Tingley (D)	Louis Cabeza de Baca (D)	Elizabeth F. Gonzales (D)	Frank H. Patton (D)	José O. García (D)	James J. Connelly (D)	Frank Vesely (D)	18D, 6R	37D, 12R	Dennis Chávez (D)	Carl Hatch (D)	John J. Dempsey (D)	Roosevelt/ Garner (D) ✓
1937	Clyde Tingley (D)	Hiram M. Dow (D)	Elizabeth F. Gonzales (D)	Frank H. Patton (D)	José O. García (D)	James J. Connelly (D)	Frank Worden (D)	23D, 1R	47D, 2R	Dennis Chávez (D)	Carl Hatch (D)	John J. Dempsey (D)	Roosevelt/ Garner (D) ✓
1938	Clyde Tingley (D)	Hiram M. Dow (D)	Elizabeth F. Gonzales (D)	Frank H. Patton (D)	José O. García (D)	James J. Connelly (D)	Frank Worden (D)	23D, 1R	47D, 2R	Dennis Chávez (D)	Carl Hatch (D)	John J. Dempsey (D)	Roosevelt/ Garner (D) ✓
1939	John E. Miles (D)	James Murray Sr. (D)	Jessie M. Gonzales (D)	Filo Sedillo (D)	E. D. Trujillo (D)	Rex French (D)	Frank Worden (D)	23D, 1R	42D, 7R	Dennis Chávez (D)	Carl Hatch (D)	John J. Dempsey (D)	Roosevelt/ Garner (D) ✓
1940	John E. Miles (D)	James Murray Sr. (D)	Jessie M. Gonzales (D)	Filo Sedillo (D)	E. D. Trujillo (D)	Rex French (D)	Frank Worden (D)	23D, 1R	42D, 7R	Dennis Chávez (D)	Carl Hatch (D)	John J. Dempsey (D)	Roosevelt/ Wallace (D) ✓
1941	John E. Miles (D)	Ceferino Quintana (D)	Jessie M. Gonzales (D)	Edward P. Chase (D)	E. D. Trujillo (D)	Rex French (D)	H. R. Rodgers (D)	21D, 3R	40D, 9R	Dennis Chávez (D)	Carl Hatch (D)	Clinton Anderson (D)	Roosevelt/ Wallace (D) ✓
1942	John E. Miles (D)	Ceferino Quintana (D)	Jessie M. Gonzales (D)	Edward P. Chase (D)	E. D. Trujillo (D)	Rex French (D)	H. R. Rodgers (D)	21D, 3R	40D, 9R	Dennis Chávez (D)	Carl Hatch (D)	Clinton Anderson (D)	Roosevelt/ Wallace (D) ✓
1943	John J. Dempsey (D)	James B. Jones (D)	Cecilia T. Cleveland (D)	Edward P. Chase (D)	J. D. Hannah (D)	Guy Shepard (D)	H. R. Rodgers (D)	21D, 3R	33D, 16R	Dennis Chávez (D)	Carl Hatch (D)	2D	Roosevelt/ Wallace (D) ✓
1944	John J. Dempsey (D)	James B. Jones (D)	Cecilia T. Cleveland (D)	Clyde P. McCulloh (D)	J. D. Hannah (D)	Guy Shepard (D)	H. R. Rodgers (D)	21D, 3R	33D, 16R	Dennis Chávez (D)	Carl Hatch (D)	2D	Roosevelt/ Truman (D) ✓
1945	John J. Dempsey (D)	James B. Jones (D)	Cecilia T. Cleveland (D)	Clyde P. McCulloh (D)	J. D. Hannah (D)	Guy Shepard (D)	John E. Miles (D)	18D, 6R	30D, 19R	Dennis Chávez (D)	Carl Hatch (D)	2D	Roosevelt/ Truman (D) ✓
1946	John J. Dempsey (D)	James B. Jones (D)	Cecilia T. Cleveland (D)	Clyde P. McCulloh (D)	J. D. Hannah (D)	Guy Shepard (D)	John E. Miles (D)	18D, 6R	30D, 19R	Dennis Chávez (D)	Carl Hatch (D)	2D	Roosevelt/ Truman (D) ✓
1947	Thomas J. Mabry (D)	Joseph Montoya (D)	Alicia Valdéz Romero (D)	Clyde P. McCulloh (D)	E. D. Trujillo (D)	H. R. Rodgers (D)	John E. Miles (D)	18D, 6R	30D, 19R	Dennis Chávez (D)	Carl Hatch (D)	2D	Roosevelt/ Truman (D) ✓
1948	Thomas J. Mabry (D)	Joseph Montoya (D)	Alicia Valdéz Romero (D)	Clyde P. McCulloh (D)	E. D. Trujillo (D)	H. R. Rodgers (D)	John E. Miles (D)	18D, 6R	30D, 19R	Dennis Chávez (D)	Carl Hatch (D)	2D	Truman/ Barkley (D) ✓
1949	Thomas J. Mabry (D)	Joseph Montoya (D)	Alicia Valdéz Romero (D)	Joe L. Martinez (D)	E. D. Trujillo (D)	H. R. Rodgers (D)	Guy Shepard (D)	19D, 5R	36D, 13R	Dennis Chávez (D)	Clinton Anderson (D)	2D	Truman/ Barkley (D) ✓
1950	Thomas J. Mabry (D)	Joseph Montoya (D)	Alicia Valdéz Romero (D)	Joe L. Martinez (D)	E. D. Trujillo (D)	H. R. Rodgers (D)	Guy Shepard (D)	19D, 5R	36D, 13R	Dennis Chávez (D)	Clinton Anderson (D)	2D	Truman/ Barkley (D) ✓
1951	Edwin L. Mechem (R)	Tibo J. Chávez (D)	Beatrice Roach Gottlieb (D)	Joe L. Martinez (D)	Robert D. Castner (D)	R. H. Grissom (D)	Guy Shepard (D)	18D, 6R	46D, 9R	Dennis Chávez (D)	Clinton Anderson (D)	2D	Truman/ Barkley (D) ✓
1952	Edwin L. Mechem (R)	Tibo J. Chávez (D)	Beatrice Roach Gottlieb (D)	Joe L. Martinez (D)	Robert D. Castner (D)	R. H. Grissom (D)	Guy Shepard (D)	18D, 6R	46D, 9R	Dennis Chávez (D)	Clinton Anderson (D)	2D	Eisenhower/ Nixon (R) ✓
1953	Edwin L. Mechem (R)	Tibo J. Chávez (D)	Beatrice Roach Gottlieb (D)	Richard H. Robinson (D)	Robert D. Castner (D)	R. H. Grissom (D)	E. S. Johnny Walker (D)	22D, 9R	28R, 27D	Dennis Chávez (D)	Clinton Anderson (D)	2D	Eisenhower/ Nixon (R) ✓
1954	Edwin L. Mechem (R)	Tibo J. Chávez (D)	Beatrice Roach Gottlieb (D)	Richard H. Robinson (D)	Robert D. Castner (D)	R. H. Grissom (D)	E. S. Johnny Walker (D)	22D, 9R	28R, 27D	Dennis Chávez (D)	Clinton Anderson (D)	2D	Eisenhower/ Nixon (R) ✓
1955	John F. Simms (D)	Joseph Montoya (D) (Note: Resigned in April 1957, after being elected to the U.S. House of Representatives.)	Natalie Smith Buck (D)	Richard H. Robinson (D)	J. D. Hannah (D)	Joseph B. Grant (D)	E. S. Johnny Walker (D)	23D, 9R	51D, 4R	Dennis Chávez (D)	Clinton Anderson (D)	2D	Eisenhower/ Nixon (R) ✓
1956	John F. Simms (D)	Joseph Montoya (D)	Natalie Smith Buck (D)	Richard H. Robinson (D)	J. D. Hannah (D)	Joseph B. Grant (D)	E. S. Johnny Walker (D)	23D, 9R	51D, 4R	Dennis Chávez (D)	Clinton Anderson (D)	2D	Eisenhower/ Nixon (R) ✓
1957	Edwin L. Mechem (R)	Joseph Montoya (D)	Natalie Smith Buck (D)	Fred M. Standley (D)	Ben Chavez (R)	Joseph B. Grant (D)	Murray E. Morgan (D)	24D, 8R	43D, 23R	Dennis Chávez (D)	Clinton Anderson (D)	2D	Eisenhower/ Nixon (R) ✓
1958	Edwin L. Mechem (R)	vacant	Natalie Smith Buck (D)	Fred M. Standley (D)	Ben Chavez (R)	Joseph B. Grant (D)	Murray E. Morgan (D)	24D, 8R	43D, 23R	Dennis Chávez (D)	Clinton Anderson (D)	2D	Eisenhower/ Nixon (R) ✓
1959	John Burroughs (D)	Ed V. Mead (D)	Betty Fiorina (D)	Frank B. Zinn (D)	Robert D. Castner (D)	Joe Callaway (D)	Murray E. Morgan (D)	24D, 8R	60D, 6R	Dennis Chávez (D)	Clinton Anderson (D)	2D	Eisenhower/ Nixon (R) ✓
1960	John Burroughs (D)	Ed V. Mead (D)	Betty Fiorina (D)	Hilton A. Dickson Jr. (D)	Robert D. Castner (D)	Joe Callaway (D)	Murray E. Morgan (D)	24D, 8R	60D, 6R	Dennis Chávez (D)	Clinton Anderson (D)	2D	Kennedy/ Johnson (D) ✓
1961	Edwin L. Mechem (R) (Note: Resigned in order to be appointed to the United States Senate by his successor.)	Tom Bolack (R)	Betty Fiorina (D)	Earl E. Hartley (D)	Robert D. Castner (D)	Joe Callaway (D)	E. S. Johnny Walker (D)	28D, 4R	59D, 7R	Dennis Chávez (D)	Clinton Anderson (D)	2D	Kennedy/ Johnson (D) ✓
1962	Edwin L. Mechem (R)	Tom Bolack (R)	Betty Fiorina (D)	Earl E. Hartley (D)	Robert D. Castner (D)	Joe Callaway (D)	E. S. Johnny Walker (D)	28D, 4R	59D, 7R	Dennis Chávez (D)	Clinton Anderson (D)	2D	Kennedy/ Johnson (D) ✓
1962	Tom Bolack (R)	vacant	Betty Fiorina (D)	Earl E. Hartley (D)	Robert D. Castner (D)	Joe Callaway (D)	E. S. Johnny Walker (D)	28D, 4R	59D, 7R	Edwin L. Mechem (R)	Clinton Anderson (D)	2D	Kennedy/ Johnson (D) ✓
1963	Jack M. Campbell (D)	Mack Easley (D) (Note: The Governor and Lt. Governor of a given political party have been elected on the same ticket since November 1964.)	Alberta Miller (D)	Earl E. Hartley (D)	Alex J. Armijo (D)	Joseph B. Grant (D)	E. S. Johnny Walker (D)	28D, 4R	55D, 11R	Edwin L. Mechem (R)	Clinton Anderson (D)	2D	Kennedy/ Johnson (D) ✓
1964	Jack M. Campbell (D)	Mack Easley (D)	Alberta Miller (D)	Earl E. Hartley (D)	Alex J. Armijo (D)	Joseph B. Grant (D)	E. S. Johnny Walker (D)	28D, 4R	55D, 11R	Edwin L. Mechem (R)	Clinton Anderson (D)	2D	Johnson/ Humphrey (D) ✓
1965	Jack M. Campbell (D)	Mack Easley (D)	Alberta Miller (D)	Boston E. Witt (D)	Alex J. Armijo (D)	Joseph B. Grant (D)	Guyton B. Hays (D)	28D, 4R	59D, 18R	Joseph Montoya (D)	Clinton Anderson (D)	2D	Johnson/ Humphrey (D) ✓
1966	Jack M. Campbell (D)	Mack Easley (D)	Alberta Miller (D)	Boston E. Witt (D)	Alex J. Armijo (D)	Joseph B. Grant (D)	Guyton B. Hays (D)	28D, 4R	59D, 18R	Joseph Montoya (D)	Clinton Anderson (D)	2D	Johnson/ Humphrey (D) ✓
1967	David Cargo (R)	Lee Francis (R)	Ernestine D. Evans (D)	Boston E. Witt (D)	Harold G. Thompson (R)	H. E. Thomas Jr. (R)	Guyton B. Hays (D)	25D, 17R	45D, 25R	Joseph Montoya (D)	Clinton Anderson (D)	2D	Johnson/ Humphrey (D) ✓
1968	David Cargo (R)	Lee Francis (R)	Ernestine D. Evans (D)	Boston E. Witt (D)	Harold G. Thompson (R)	Merrill B. Johns (R)	Guyton B. Hays (D)	25D, 17R	45D, 25R	Joseph Montoya (D)	Clinton Anderson (D)	2D	Nixon/ Agnew (R) ✓
1969	David Cargo (R)	Lee Francis (R)	Ernestine D. Evans (D)	James A. Maloney (D)	Harold G. Thompson (R)	Jesse D. Kornegay (D)	Alex J. Armijo (D)	25D, 17R	44D, 26R	Joseph Montoya (D)	Clinton Anderson (D)	2R	Nixon/ Agnew (R) ✓
1970	David Cargo (R)	Lee Francis (R)	Ernestine D. Evans (D)	James A. Maloney (D)	Harold G. Thompson (R)	Jesse D. Kornegay (D)	Alex J. Armijo (D)	25D, 17R	44D, 26R	Joseph Montoya (D)	Clinton Anderson (D)	2R	Nixon/ Agnew (R) ✓
1971	Bruce King (D)	Roberto Mondragón (D)	Betty Fiorina (D)	David L. Norvell (D)	Frank Olmstead (D)	Jesse D. Kornegay (D)	Alex J. Armijo (D)	28D, 14R	48D, 22R	Joseph Montoya (D)	Clinton Anderson (D)	1R, 1D	Nixon/ Agnew (R) ✓
1972	Bruce King (D)	Roberto Mondragón (D)	Betty Fiorina (D)	David L. Norvell (D)	Frank Olmstead (D)	Jesse D. Kornegay (D)	Alex J. Armijo (D)	28D, 14R	48D, 22R	Joseph Montoya (D)	Clinton Anderson (D)	1R, 1D	Nixon/ Agnew (R) ✓
1973	Bruce King (D)	Roberto Mondragón (D)	Betty Fiorina (D)	David L. Norvell (D)	Frank Olmstead (D)	Jesse D. Kornegay (D)	Alex J. Armijo (D)	30D, 12R	51D, 19R	Joseph Montoya (D)	Pete Domenici (R)	1R, 1D	Nixon/ Agnew (R) ✓
1974	Bruce King (D)	Roberto Mondragón (D)	Betty Fiorina (D)	David L. Norvell (D)	Frank Olmstead (D)	Jesse D. Kornegay (D)	Alex J. Armijo (D)	30D, 12R	50D, 20R	Joseph Montoya (D)	Pete Domenici (R)	1R, 1D	Nixon/ Agnew (R) ✓
1975	Jerry Apodaca (D)	Robert E. Ferguson (D)	Ernestine D. Evans (D)	Toney Anaya (D)	Max R. Sanchez (D)	Edward M. Murphy (D)	Phil R. Lucero (D)	29D, 13R	51D, 19R	Joseph Montoya (D)	Pete Domenici (R)	1R, 1D	Nixon/ Agnew (R) ✓
1976	Jerry Apodaca (D)	Robert E. Ferguson (D)	Ernestine D. Evans (D)	Toney Anaya (D)	Max R. Sanchez (D)	Edward M. Murphy (D)	Phil R. Lucero (D)	30D, 12R	51D, 19R	Joseph Montoya (D)	Pete Domenici (R)	1R, 1D	Ford/ Dole (R) ✗
1977	Jerry Apodaca (D)	Robert E. Ferguson (D)	Ernestine D. Evans (D)	Toney Anaya (D)	Max R. Sanchez (D)	Edward M. Murphy (D)	Phil R. Lucero (D)	33D, 9R	48D, 22R	Harrison Schmitt (R)	Pete Domenici (R)	1R, 1D	Ford/ Dole (R) ✗
1978	Jerry Apodaca (D)	Robert E. Ferguson (D)	Ernestine D. Evans (D)	Toney Anaya (D)	Alvino E. Castillo (D)	Edward M. Murphy (D)	Phil R. Lucero (D)	33D, 9R	48D, 22R	Harrison Schmitt (R)	Pete Domenici (R)	1R, 1D	Ford/ Dole (R) ✗
1979	Bruce King (D)	Roberto Mondragón (D)	Shirley Hooper (D)	Jeff Bingaman (D)	Alvino E. Castillo (D)	Jan Alan Hartkey (D)	Alex J. Armijo (D)	33D, 9R	41D, 29R (Note: A coalition of 11 Democrats and 26 Republicans controlled the House Majority and elected a Democratic Speaker.)	Harrison Schmitt (R)	Pete Domenici (R)	1R, 1D	Ford/ Dole (R) ✗
1980	Bruce King (D)	Roberto Mondragón (D)	Shirley Hooper (D)	Jeff Bingaman (D)	Alvino E. Castillo (D)	Jan Alan Hartkey (D)	Alex J. Armijo (D)	32D, 10R	41D, 29R	Harrison Schmitt (R)	Pete Domenici (R)	1R, 1D	Reagan/ Bush (R) ✓
1981	Bruce King (D)	Roberto Mondragón (D)	Shirley Hooper (D)	Jeff Bingaman (D)	Alvino E. Castillo (D)	Jan Alan Hartkey (D)	Alex J. Armijo (D)	22D, 20R	41D, 29R (Note: A coalition of 10 Democrats and 27 Republicans controlled the House Majority and elected a Democratic Speaker.)	Harrison Schmitt (R)	Pete Domenici (R)	2R	Reagan/ Bush (R) ✓
1982	Bruce King (D)	Roberto Mondragón (D)	Shirley Hooper (D)	Jeff Bingaman (D)	Alvino E. Castillo (D)	Jan Alan Hartkey (D)	Alex J. Armijo (D)	23D, 19R	41D, 29R	Harrison Schmitt (R)	Pete Domenici (R)	2R	Reagan/ Bush (R) ✓
1983	Toney Anaya (D)	Mike Runnels (D)	Clara Padilla Jones (D)	Paul Bardacke (D)	Albert Romero (D)	Earl E. Hartley (D)	Jim Baca (D)	23D, 19R	46D, 24R	Jeff Bingaman (D)	Pete Domenici (R)	2R, 1D	Reagan/ Bush (R) ✓
1984	Toney Anaya (D)	Mike Runnels (D)	Clara Padilla Jones (D)	Paul Bardacke (D)	Albert Romero (D)	Earl E. Hartley (D)	Jim Baca (D)	23D, 19R	47D, 23R	Jeff Bingaman (D)	Pete Domenici (R)	2R, 1D	Reagan/ Bush (R) ✓
1985	Toney Anaya (D)	Mike Runnels (D)	Clara Padilla Jones (D)	Paul Bardacke (D)	Albert Romero (D)	Earl E. Hartley (D)	Jim Baca (D)	21D, 21R (Note: A coalition of 3 Democrats and 21 Republicans controlled the Senate Majority.)	43D, 27R (Note: A coalition of 10 Democrats and 26 Republicans controlled the House Majority and elected a Democratic Speaker.)	Jeff Bingaman (D)	Pete Domenici (R)	2R, 1D	Reagan/ Bush (R) ✓
1986	Toney Anaya (D)	Mike Runnels (D)	Clara Padilla Jones (D)	Paul Bardacke (D)	Albert Romero (D)	James B. Lewis (D)	Jim Baca (D)	22R, 20D (Note: A Democrat switched parties to become a Republican.)	43D, 27R	Jeff Bingaman (D)	Pete Domenici (R)	2R, 1D	Reagan/ Bush (R) ✓
1986	Toney Anaya (D)	Mike Runnels (D)	Clara Padilla Jones (D)	Paul Bardacke (D)	Albert Romero (D)	James B. Lewis (D)	Jim Baca (D)	22R, 20D (Note: A coalition of 19 Democrats and 4 Republicans controlled the Senate Majority during a special session in September 1986.)	43D, 27R	Jeff Bingaman (D)	Pete Domenici (R)	2R, 1D	Reagan/ Bush (R) ✓
1987	Garrey Carruthers (R)	Jack L. Stahl (R)	Rebecca Vigil-Giron (D)	Hal Stratton (R)	Harroll H. Adams (D)	James B. Lewis (D)	W. R. Humphries (R)	21D, 21R (Note: A coalition of 21 Democrats and 3 Republicans controlled the Senate Majority.)	47D, 23R	Jeff Bingaman (D)	Pete Domenici (R)	2R, 1D	Reagan/ Bush (R) ✓
1988	Garrey Carruthers (R)	Jack L. Stahl (R)	Rebecca Vigil-Giron (D)	Hal Stratton (R)	Harroll H. Adams (D)	James B. Lewis (D)	W. R. Humphries (R)	21D, 21R (Note: A coalition of 5 Democrats and 18 Republicans controlled the Senate Majority.)	46D, 24R	Jeff Bingaman (D)	Pete Domenici (R)	2R, 1D	Bush/ Quayle (R) ✓
1989	Garrey Carruthers (R)	Jack L. Stahl (R)	Rebecca Vigil-Giron (D)	Hal Stratton (R)	Harroll H. Adams (D)	James B. Lewis (D)	W. R. Humphries (R)	26D, 16R	45D, 25R	Jeff Bingaman (D)	Pete Domenici (R)	2R, 1D	Bush/ Quayle (R) ✓
1990	Garrey Carruthers (R)	Jack L. Stahl (R)	Rebecca Vigil-Giron (D)	Hal Stratton (R)	Harroll H. Adams (D)	James B. Lewis (D)	W. R. Humphries (R)	25D, 17R	45D, 25R	Jeff Bingaman (D)	Pete Domenici (R)	2R, 1D	Bush/ Quayle (R) ✓
1991	Bruce King (D)	Casey Luna (D)	Stephanie Gonzales (D)	Tom Udall (D)	Robert E. Vigil (D)	David W. King (D)	Jim Baca (D) (Note: Resigned May 19, 1993 to become director of the U.S. Bureau of Land Management.)	26D, 16R	49D, 21R	Jeff Bingaman (D)	Pete Domenici (R)	2R, 1D	Bush/ Quayle (R) ✓
1992	Bruce King (D)	Casey Luna (D)	Stephanie Gonzales (D)	Tom Udall (D)	Robert E. Vigil (D)	David W. King (D)	Jim Baca (D)	26D, 16R	49D, 21R	Jeff Bingaman (D)	Pete Domenici (R)	2R, 1D	Clinton/ Gore (D) ✓
1993	Bruce King (D)	Casey Luna (D)	Stephanie Gonzales (D)	Tom Udall (D)	Robert E. Vigil (D)	David W. King (D)	Ray Powell (D)	27D, 15R	53D, 17R	Jeff Bingaman (D)	Pete Domenici (R)	2R, 1D	Clinton/ Gore (D) ✓
1994	Bruce King (D)	Casey Luna (D)	Stephanie Gonzales (D)	Tom Udall (D)	Robert E. Vigil (D)	David W. King (D)	Ray Powell (D)	27D, 15R	53D, 17R	Jeff Bingaman (D)	Pete Domenici (R)	2R, 1D	Clinton/ Gore (D) ✓
1995	Gary Johnson (R)	Walter Dwight Bradley (R)	Stephanie Gonzales (D)	Tom Udall (D)	Robert E. Vigil (D)	Michael A. Montoya (D)	Ray Powell (D)	27D, 15R	46D, 24R	Jeff Bingaman (D)	Pete Domenici (R)	2R, 1D	Clinton/ Gore (D) ✓
1996	Gary Johnson (R)	Walter Dwight Bradley (R)	Stephanie Gonzales (D)	Tom Udall (D)	Robert E. Vigil (D)	Michael A. Montoya (D)	Ray Powell (D)	27D, 15R	46D, 24R	Jeff Bingaman (D)	Pete Domenici (R)	2R, 1D	Clinton/ Gore (D) ✓
1997	Gary Johnson (R)	Walter Dwight Bradley (R)	Stephanie Gonzales (D)	Tom Udall (D)	Robert E. Vigil (D)	Michael A. Montoya (D)	Ray Powell (D)	25D, 17R	42D, 28R	Jeff Bingaman (D)	Pete Domenici (R)	2R, 1D	Clinton/ Gore (D) ✓
1997	Gary Johnson (R)	Walter Dwight Bradley (R)	Stephanie Gonzales (D)	Tom Udall (D)	Robert E. Vigil (D)	Michael A. Montoya (D)	Ray Powell (D)	25D, 17R	42D, 28R	Jeff Bingaman (D)	Pete Domenici (R)	3R (Note: Democrat Bill Richardson resigned on February 13, 1997. Republican Bill Redmond elected to replace him on May 13, 1997.)	Clinton/ Gore (D) ✓
1998	Gary Johnson (R)	Walter Dwight Bradley (R)	Stephanie Gonzales (D)	Tom Udall (D)	Robert E. Vigil (D)	Michael A. Montoya (D)	Ray Powell (D)	25D, 17R	42D, 28R	Jeff Bingaman (D)	Pete Domenici (R)	3R	Clinton/ Gore (D) ✓
1999	Gary Johnson (R)	Walter Dwight Bradley (R)	Rebecca Vigil-Giron (D)	Patricia A. Madrid (D)	Domingo Martinez (D)	Michael A. Montoya (D)	Ray Powell (D)	25D, 17R	40D, 30R	Jeff Bingaman (D)	Pete Domenici (R)	2R, 1D	Clinton/ Gore (D) ✓
2000	Gary Johnson (R)	Walter Dwight Bradley (R)	Rebecca Vigil-Giron (D)	Patricia A. Madrid (D)	Domingo Martinez (D)	Michael A. Montoya (D)	Ray Powell (D)	25D, 17R	40D, 30R	Jeff Bingaman (D)	Pete Domenici (R)	2R, 1D	Gore/ Lieberman (D) ✗
2001	Gary Johnson (R)	Walter Dwight Bradley (R)	Rebecca Vigil-Giron (D)	Patricia A. Madrid (D)	Domingo Martinez (D)	Michael A. Montoya (D)	Ray Powell (D)	24D, 18R (Note: A coalition of 3 Democrats and 18 Republicans controlled the Senate Majority. The Lieutenant Governor broke the tie.)	42D, 28R	Jeff Bingaman (D)	Pete Domenici (R)	2R, 1D	Gore/ Lieberman (D) ✗
2002	Gary Johnson (R)	Walter Dwight Bradley (R)	Rebecca Vigil-Giron (D)	Patricia A. Madrid (D)	Domingo Martinez (D)	Michael A. Montoya (D)	Ray Powell (D)	24D, 18R	42D, 28R	Jeff Bingaman (D)	Pete Domenici (R)	2R, 1D	Gore/ Lieberman (D) ✗
2003	Bill Richardson (D)	Diane Denish (D)	Rebecca Vigil-Giron (D)	Patricia A. Madrid (D)	Domingo Martinez (D)	Robert E. Vigil (D)	Patrick H. Lyons (R)	24D, 18R	43D, 27R	Jeff Bingaman (D)	Pete Domenici (R)	2R, 1D	Gore/ Lieberman (D) ✗
2004	Bill Richardson (D)	Diane Denish (D)	Rebecca Vigil-Giron (D)	Patricia A. Madrid (D)	Domingo Martinez (D)	Robert E. Vigil (D)	Patrick H. Lyons (R)	24D, 18R	43D, 27R	Jeff Bingaman (D)	Pete Domenici (R)	2R, 1D	Bush/ Cheney (R) ✓
2005	Bill Richardson (D)	Diane Denish (D)	Rebecca Vigil-Giron (D)	Patricia A. Madrid (D)	Domingo Martinez (D)	Douglas M. Brown (R)	Patrick H. Lyons (R)	24D, 18R	42D, 28R	Jeff Bingaman (D)	Pete Domenici (R)	2R, 1D	Bush/ Cheney (R) ✓
2006	Bill Richardson (D)	Diane Denish (D)	Rebecca Vigil-Giron (D)	Patricia A. Madrid (D)	Domingo Martinez (D)	Douglas M. Brown (R)	Patrick H. Lyons (R)	24D, 18R	42D, 28R	Jeff Bingaman (D)	Pete Domenici (R)	2R, 1D	Bush/ Cheney (R) ✓
2007	Bill Richardson (D)	Diane Denish (D)	Mary Herrera (D)	Gary King (D)	Hector Balderas (D)	James B. Lewis (D)	Patrick H. Lyons (R)	24D, 18R	42D, 28R	Jeff Bingaman (D)	Pete Domenici (R)	2R, 1D	Bush/ Cheney (R) ✓
2008	Bill Richardson (D)	Diane Denish (D)	Mary Herrera (D)	Gary King (D)	Hector Balderas (D)	James B. Lewis (D)	Patrick H. Lyons (R)	24D, 18R	42D, 28R	Jeff Bingaman (D)	Pete Domenici (R)	2R, 1D	Obama/ Biden (D) ✓
2009	Bill Richardson (D)	Diane Denish (D)	Mary Herrera (D)	Gary King (D)	Hector Balderas (D)	James B. Lewis (D)	Patrick H. Lyons (R)	27D, 15R	45D, 25R	Jeff Bingaman (D)	Tom Udall (D)	3D	Obama/ Biden (D) ✓
2010	Bill Richardson (D)	Diane Denish (D)	Mary Herrera (D)	Gary King (D)	Hector Balderas (D)	James B. Lewis (D)	Patrick H. Lyons (R)	27D, 15R	45D, 25R	Jeff Bingaman (D)	Tom Udall (D)	3D	Obama/ Biden (D) ✓
2011	Susana Martinez (R)	John Sanchez (R)	Dianna Duran (R)	Gary King (D)	Hector Balderas (D)	James B. Lewis (D)	Ray Powell (D)	27D, 15R	36D, 34R	Jeff Bingaman (D)	Tom Udall (D)	2D, 1R	Obama/ Biden (D) ✓
2012	Susana Martinez (R)	John Sanchez (R)	Dianna Duran (R)	Gary King (D)	Hector Balderas (D)	James B. Lewis (D)	Ray Powell (D)	27D, 15R	36D, 34R	Jeff Bingaman (D)	Tom Udall (D)	2D, 1R	Obama/ Biden (D) ✓
2013	Susana Martinez (R)	John Sanchez (R)	Dianna Duran (R)	Gary King (D)	Hector Balderas (D)	James B. Lewis (D)	Ray Powell (D)	25D, 17R	38D, 32R	Martin Heinrich (D)	Tom Udall (D)	2D, 1R	Obama/ Biden (D) ✓
2014	Susana Martinez (R)	John Sanchez (R)	Dianna Duran (R)	Gary King (D)	Hector Balderas (D)	James B. Lewis (D)	Ray Powell (D)	25D, 17R	37D, 33R	Martin Heinrich (D)	Tom Udall (D)	2D, 1R	Obama/ Biden (D) ✓
2015	Susana Martinez (R)	John Sanchez (R)	Dianna Duran (R)	Hector Balderas (D)	Tim Keller (D)	Tim Eichenberg (D)	Aubrey Dunn Jr. (R)	24D, 18R (Note: Sen. Phil Griego (D-39) resigned on March 14 over a scandal involving state building sale. A Republican, Ted Barela, was appointed to replace him on April 3.)	37R, 33D	Martin Heinrich (D)	Tom Udall (D)	2D, 1R	Obama/ Biden (D) ✓
2016	Susana Martinez (R)	John Sanchez (R)	Brad Winter (R)	Hector Balderas (D)	Tim Keller (D)	Tim Eichenberg (D)	Aubrey Dunn Jr. (R)	24D, 18R	37R, 33D	Martin Heinrich (D)	Tom Udall (D)	2D, 1R	Clinton/ Kaine (D) ✗
2017	Susana Martinez (R)	John Sanchez (R)	Maggie Toulouse Oliver (D)	Hector Balderas (D)	Tim Keller (D)	Tim Eichenberg (D)	Aubrey Dunn Jr. (R)	26D, 16R	38D, 32R	Martin Heinrich (D)	Tom Udall (D)	2D, 1R	Clinton/ Kaine (D) ✗
2018	Susana Martinez (R)	John Sanchez (R)	Maggie Toulouse Oliver (D)	Hector Balderas (D)	Wayne Johnson (R)	Tim Eichenberg (D)	Aubrey Dunn Jr. (L)	26D, 16R	38D, 32R	Martin Heinrich (D)	Tom Udall (D)	2D, 1R	Clinton/ Kaine (D) ✗
2019	Michelle Lujan Grisham (D)	Howie Morales (D)	Maggie Toulouse Oliver (D)	Hector Balderas (D)	Brian Colón (D)	Tim Eichenberg (D)	Stephanie Garcia; Richard (D)	26D, 16R	46D, 24R	Martin Heinrich (D)	Tom Udall (D)	3D	Clinton/ Kaine (D) ✗
2020	Michelle Lujan Grisham (D)	Howie Morales (D)	Maggie Toulouse Oliver (D)	Hector Balderas (D)	Brian Colón (D)	Tim Eichenberg (D)	Stephanie Garcia; Richard (D)	26D, 16R	46D, 24R	Martin Heinrich (D)	Tom Udall (D)	3D	Biden/ Harris (D) ✓
2021	Michelle Lujan Grisham (D)	Howie Morales (D)	Maggie Toulouse Oliver (D)	Hector Balderas (D)	Brian Colón (D)	Tim Eichenberg (D)	Stephanie Garcia; Richard (D)	27D, 15R	45D, 24R, 1I (Note: Elected independent Brittney Barreras switched to the Democratic party before the legislative session began. Republican Phelps Anderson became an independent in February 2021.)	Martin Heinrich (D)	Ben Ray Luján (D)	2D, 1R	Biden/ Harris (D) ✓
2022	Michelle Lujan Grisham (D)	Howie Morales (D)	Maggie Toulouse Oliver (D)	Hector Balderas (D)	Brian Colón (D)	Tim Eichenberg (D)	Stephanie Garcia; Richard (D)	27D, 15R	45D, 24R, 1I	Martin Heinrich (D)	Ben Ray Luján (D)	2D, 1R	Biden/ Harris (D) ✓
2023	Michelle Lujan Grisham (D)	Howie Morales (D)	Maggie Toulouse Oliver (D)	Raúl Torrez (D)	Joseph Maestas (D)	Laura Montoya (D)	Stephanie Garcia; Richard (D)	27D, 15R	45D, 25R	Martin Heinrich (D)	Ben Ray Luján (D)	3D	Biden/ Harris (D) ✓
2024	Michelle Lujan Grisham (D)	Howie Morales (D)	Maggie Toulouse Oliver (D)	Raúl Torrez (D)	Joseph Maestas (D)	Laura Montoya (D)	Stephanie Garcia; Richard (D)	27D, 15R	45D, 25R	Martin Heinrich (D)	Ben Ray Luján (D)	3D	Harris/ Walz (D) ✗
2025	Michelle Lujan Grisham (D)	Howie Morales (D)	Maggie Toulouse Oliver (D)	Raúl Torrez (D)	Joseph Maestas (D)	Laura Montoya (D)	Stephanie Garcia; Richard (D)	26D, 16R	44D, 26R	Martin Heinrich (D)	Ben Ray Luján (D)	3D	Harris/ Walz (D) ✗
2026	Michelle Lujan Grisham (D)	Howie Morales (D)	Maggie Toulouse Oliver (D)	Raúl Torrez (D)	Joseph Maestas (D)	Laura Montoya (D)	Stephanie Garcia; Richard (D)	26D, 16R	44D, 26R	Martin Heinrich (D)	Ben Ray Luján (D)	3D	Harris/ Walz (D) ✗
2027	Deb Haaland (D)	Stephanie Garcia; Richard (D)	Amanda López Askin (D)	Raúl Torrez (D)	Joseph Maestas (D)	Laura Montoya (D)	Juan Sanchez (D)	26D, 16R	47D, 23R	Martin Heinrich (D)	Ben Ray Luján (D)	3D	Harris/ Walz (D) ✗

== See also ==
- Politics in New Mexico
