= List of female secretaries of state in the United States =

== List of female United States secretaries of state ==
N°	Secretary		Party	Vote (Note: Where no vote is listed, confirmation was by voice vote or otherwise unrecorded.)	Term of office			State	President(s)
N°	Portrait	Name	Party	Vote	Took office	Left office	Term	State	President(s)
64		Madeleine Albright (1937–2022)	Democratic	99–0	January 23, 1997	January 20, 2001	3 years, 363 days	District of Columbia	Bill Clinton (1993–2001)
66		Condoleezza Rice (b. 1954)	Republican	85–13	January 26, 2005	January 20, 2009	3 years, 360 days	California	George W. Bush (2001–2009)
67		Hillary Clinton (b. 1947)	Democratic	94–2	January 21, 2009	February 1, 2013	4 years, 11 days	New York	Barack Obama (2009–2017)
–		Lisa D. Kenna (b. 1965) (Note: As Acting Assistant Secretary of State for Intelligence and Research)	Independent	–	January 20, 2025	January 21, 2025	1 day	Vermont	Donald Trump (2025–present)

== List of female state secretaries of state ==
The following is a list of female secretaries of state of states and territories in the United States.

Besides those states which do not have separate offices for secretary of state, the states of Idaho, Illinois, Massachusetts, Mississippi, Nebraska, New Hampshire, North Dakota and South Carolina have never had an appointed nor elected female secretary of state.

Officeholder	State	Party	Assumed office	Term end
Soledad Chacón	New Mexico	Democratic	1923	1926
Emma Guy Cromwell	Kentucky	Democratic	1924	1928
Fannie Herrington	Delaware	Republican	1925	1926
Emma Grigsby Meharg	Texas	Republican	1925	1927
Florence E. S. Knapp	New York	Republican	January 1, 1925	December 31, 1927
Gladys Pyle	South Dakota	Republican	1927	1931
Jennie Fortune	New Mexico	Democratic	1927	1928
Jane Y. McCallum	Texas	Republican	1927	1933
Ella Lewis	Kentucky	Democratic	1928	1932
Jesusita Acosta Perrault	New Mexico	Republican	1929	1930
Alice Lee Grosjean	Louisiana	Democratic	1930	1932
Elizabeth Coyne	South Dakota	Republican	1931	1933
Marguerite Baca	New Mexico	Democratic	1931	1934
Sara Mahan	Kentucky	Democratic	1932	1936
Myrtle Morrison	South Dakota	Democratic	1933	1937
Ola Babcock Miller	Iowa	Democratic	1933	1937
Elizabeth Gonzales	New Mexico	Democratic	1935	1938
Goldie Wells	South Dakota	Democratic	1937	1939
Belle Reeves	Washington	Democratic	1938	1948
Sara Crawford	Connecticut	Republican	1939	1941
Jessie Gonzales	New Mexico	Democratic	1939	1942
Olive Ringsrud	South Dakota	Republican	1939	1943
Sophia O'Hara	Pennsylvania	Republican	1939	1943
Chase G. Woodhouse	Connecticut	Democratic	1941	1943
Frances Burke Redick	Connecticut	Republican	1943	1945
Cecilia Cleveland	New Mexico	Democratic	1943	1946
Henrietta Larsen	South Dakota	Republican	1943	1947
Mary Hart Carr	Tennessee	Democratic	1944	1945
Sibyl Pool	Alabama	Democratic	1944	1951
Katherine Manton	Oklahoma	Democratic	1946	1947
Helen Burbank	Vermont	Republican	1947	1949
Frances Burke Redick	Connecticut	Republican	1947	1949
Alicia Valdez Romero	New Mexico	Democratic	1947	1950
Annamae Riff	South Dakota	Republican	1947	1951
Thelma Gordon	Virginia	Democratic	1948	1952
Winifred McDonald	Connecticut	Democratic	1949	1951
Vivian V. Simpson	Maryland	Democratic	1949	1951
Alice Leopold	Connecticut	Republican	1951	1953
Beatrice Roach Gottlieb	New Mexico	Democratic	1951	1954
Agnes Baggett	Alabama	Democratic	1951	1955
Geraldine Ostroot	South Dakota	Republican	1951	1957
Virginia Paul Holm	Minnesota	Republican	1952	1955
Martha Bell Conway	Virginia	Democratic	1952	1970
Glenn Wise	Wisconsin	Republican	1955	1957
Natalie Smith Buck	New Mexico	Democratic	1955	1958
Mary Texas Hurt Garner	Alabama	Democratic	1955	1959
Mildred P. Allen	Connecticut	Republican	1955	1959
Thelma Stovall	Kentucky	Democratic	1956	1960
Helen F. Holt	West Virginia	Republican	1957	1958
Clara Halls	South Dakota	Republican	1957	1959
Selma Sandless	South Dakota	Democratic	1959	1961
Betty Fiorina	New Mexico	Democratic	1959	1962
Bettye Frink	Alabama	Democratic	1959	1963
Caroline Simon	New York	Republican	January 1, 1959	August 22, 1963
Ella T. Grasso	Connecticut	Democratic	1959	1971
Nancy Hall	Arkansas	Democratic	1961	1963
Essie Wiedenman	South Dakota	Republican	1961	1965
Alberta Miller	New Mexico	Democratic	1963	1966
Agnes Baggett	Alabama	Democratic	1963	1967
Thyra Thomson	Wyoming	Republican	January 1963	January 1987
Thelma Stovall	Kentucky	Democratic	1964	1968
Alma Larson	South Dakota	Republican	1965	1973
Elwill Shanahan	Kansas	Republican	1966	1978
Ernestine D. Evans	New Mexico	Democratic	1967	1970
Mabel Sanders Amos	Alabama	Democratic	1967	1975
Leila Feltner Begley	Kentucky	Republican	1970	1971
Cynthia Newman	Virginia	Republican	1970	1974
Betty Fiorina	New Mexico	Democratic	1971	1974
C. Delores Tucker	Pennsylvania	Democratic	1971	1977
Gloria Schaffer	Connecticut	Democratic	1971	1978
Thelma Stovall	Kentucky	Democratic	1972	1976
Lorna Herseth	South Dakota	Democratic	1973	1979
Dorothy Glisson	Florida	Democratic	1974	1975
Patricia Perkinson	Virginia	Republican	1974	1978
Mary Estill Buchanan	Colorado	Republican	1974	1983
Ernestine D. Evans	New Mexico	Democratic	1975	1978
Agnes Baggett	Alabama	Democratic	1975	1979
March Fong Eu	California	Democratic	January 6, 1975	May 7, 1994
Joan Growe	Minnesota	Democratic (DFL)	1975	1999
Norma Paulus	Oregon	Republican	January 3, 1977	January 7, 1985
Rose Mofford	Arizona	Democratic	October 20, 1977	April 5, 1988
Ethel D. Allen	Pennsylvania	Republican	1979	1979
Shirley Hooper	New Mexico	Democratic	1979	1982
Alice Kundert	South Dakota	Republican	1979	1986
Jeanette Bartleson Edmondson	Oklahoma	Democratic	1979	1987
Vel Phillips	Wisconsin	Democratic	January 3, 1979	May 3, 1983
Barbara Kennelly	Connecticut	Democratic	1979	1982
Frances Jones Mills	Kentucky	Democratic	1980	1984
Mary Jane Odell	Iowa	Republican	1980	1987
Marilyn Lussen (acting)	Virginia	Republican	1981	1982
Laurie Naismith	Virginia	Democratic	1982	1985
Maura Melley	Connecticut	Democratic	1982	1983
Patricia Holtz	Maryland	Democratic	1982	1983
Jane Burgio	New Jersey	Republican	1982	1990
Clara Padilla Jones	New Mexico	Democratic	1983	1986
Susan Farmer	Rhode Island	Republican	1983	1987
Lorraine Sheehan	Maryland	Democratic	1983	1987
Julia Tashjian	Connecticut	Democratic	1983	1991
Gail S. Shaffer	New York	Democratic	January 1, 1983	January 4, 1995
Natalie Meyer	Colorado	Republican	1983	1995
Myra McDaniel	Texas	Republican	1984	1987
Barbara Roberts	Oregon	Democratic	January 7, 1985	January 14, 1991
Sandra Bowen	Virginia	Democratic	1986	1990
Joyce Hazeltine	South Dakota	Republican	1986	2003
Rebecca Vigil-Giron	New Mexico	Democratic	1987	1990
Hannah Atkins	Oklahoma	Democratic	1987	1991
Kathleen S. Connell	Rhode Island	Democratic	1987	1993
Elaine Baxter	Iowa	Democratic	1987	1995
Kathy Karpan	Wyoming	Democratic	January 1987	January 1995
Frankie Sue Del Papa	Nevada	Democratic	1987	1991
Joan Haberle	New Jersey	Democratic	1990	1992
Pamela Womack	Virginia	Democratic	1990	1993
Pauline R. Kezer	Connecticut	Republican	1991	1995
Cheryl Lau	Nevada	Republican	1991	1995
Stephanie Gonzales	New Mexico	Democratic	1991	1998
Brenda Mitchell	Pennsylvania	Democratic	1992	1994
Ruby Grant Martin	Virginia	Democratic	1993	1994
Judith Moriarty	Missouri	Democratic	1993	1994
Barbara Leonard	Rhode Island	Republican	1993	1995
Betsy Davis Beamer	Virginia	Republican	1994	1998
Glo Henley	Oklahoma	Democratic	1994	1995
Lonna Hooks	New Jersey	Republican	1994	1998
Rebecca McDowell Cook	Missouri	Democratic	1994	2001
Sue Anne Gilroy	Indiana	Republican	1994	2002
Yvette Kane	Pennsylvania	Democratic	1995	1998
Victoria Buckley	Colorado	Republican	1995	1999
Sandra Mortham	Florida	Republican	1995	1999
Diana Ohman	Wyoming	Republican	January 1995	January 1999
Jane Dee Hull	Arizona	Republican	January 3, 1995	September 5, 1997
Sharon Priest	Arkansas	Democratic	1995	2003
Janice Faulkner	North Carolina	Democratic	1996	1997
Elaine Marshall	North Carolina	Democratic	January 3, 1997	Incumbent
Betsey Bayless	Arizona	Republican	September 5, 1997	January 6, 2003
Carol Cronheim (acting)	New Jersey	Republican	1998	1999
Anne Petera	Virginia	Republican	1998	2002
Katherine Harris	Florida	Republican	1999	2002
Kim Pizzingrilli	Pennsylvania	Republican	1999	2002
Donetta Davidson	Colorado	Republican	1999	2005
Rebecca Vigil-Giron	New Mexico	Democratic	1999	2006
Cathy Cox	Georgia	Democratic	1999	2007
Mary Kiffmeyer	Minnesota	Republican	1997	2007
Deborah Markowitz	Vermont	Democratic	1999	2011
Susan Bysiewicz	Connecticut	Democratic	1999	2011
Harriet Smith Windsor	Delaware	Democratic	2001	2009
Kay Dudley	Oklahoma	Republican	2002	2003
Gwyn Shea	Texas	Republican	2002	2003
Anita Rimler	Virginia	Democratic	2002	2006
Regena Thomas	New Jersey	Democratic	2002	2006
Glenda Hood	Florida	Republican	2003	2005
Nancy Worley	Alabama	Democratic	2003	2007
Jan Brewer	Arizona	Republican	January 6, 2003	January 21, 2009
M. Susan Savage	Oklahoma	Democratic	2003	2011
Cathy Mitchell (acting)	California	Democratic	2005	2005
Sue M. Cobb	Florida	Republican	2005	2007
Gigi Dennis	Colorado	Republican	2005	2007
Mary Kane	Maryland	Republican	2005	2007
Betty Ireland	West Virginia	Republican	2005	2009
Robin Carnahan	Missouri	Democratic	2005	2013
Katherine Hanley	Virginia	Democratic	2006	2010
Nina Mitchell Wells	New Jersey	Democratic	2006	2010
Karen Handel	Georgia	Republican	1999	2007
Esperanza Andrade	Texas	Republican	2008	2012
Mary Herrera	New Mexico	Democratic	2007	2010
Jennifer Brunner	Ohio	Democratic	January 8, 2007	January 10, 2011
Beth Chapman	Alabama	Republican	2007	2013
Lorraine Cortés-Vázquez	New York	Democratic	January 1, 2007	September 1, 2010
Debra Bowen	California	Democratic	January 8, 2007	January 4, 2015
Kate Brown	Oregon	Democratic	January 5, 2009	February 18, 2015
Linda McCulloch	Montana	Democratic	2009	2017
Natalie Tennant	West Virginia	Democratic	2009	2017
Dawn Roberts (interim)	Florida	Republican	2010	2011
Ruth Noemí Colón	New York	Democratic	September 1, 2010	May 2, 2011
Janet Vestal Kelly	Virginia	Republican	2010	2014
Kim Guadagno	New Jersey	Republican	2010	2018
Jennifer Kennedy (interim)	Florida	Republican	2011	2011
Denise Merrill	Connecticut	Democratic	January 5, 2011	June 30, 2022
Elaine Waler	Kentucky	Democratic	2011	2012
Carol Aichele	Pennsylvania	Republican	2011	2015
Dianna Duran	New Mexico	Republican	2011	2015
Alison Grimes	Kentucky	Democratic	January 2, 2012	2020
Connie Lawson	Indiana	Republican	March 16, 2012	March 16, 2021
Michelle Day (interim)	Oklahoma	Republican	2013	2013
Kim Wyman	Washington	Republican	January 16, 2013	November 19, 2021
Nandita Berry	Texas	Republican	2014	2015
Mary Quintana (acting)	New Mexico		2015	2015
Barbara Cegavske	Nevada	Republican	January 5, 2015	2023
Shantel Krebs	South Dakota	Republican	2015	2019
Michele Reagan	Arizona	Republican	January 5, 2015	January 7, 2019
Jeanne Atkins	Oregon	Democratic	March 11, 2015	January 2, 2017
Karen Wheeler (acting)	Wyoming	Republican	2018	2018
Kathy Boockvar (interim)	Pennsylvania	Democratic	January 5, 2019	2021
Nellie Gorbea	Rhode Island	Democratic	January 6, 2015	2023
Rossana Rosado	New York	Democratic	February 22, 2016	2021
Kelly Thomasson	Virginia	Democratic	April 15, 2016	January 15, 2022
Maggie Toulouse Oliver	New Mexico	Democratic	December 9, 2016	Incumbent
Robyn Crittenden	Georgia	Republican	November 8, 2018	January 14, 2019
Tahesha Way	New Jersey	Democratic	January 16, 2018	January 20, 2026
Jennifer Kennedy (interim)	Florida	Republican	2019	2019
Jocelyn Benson	Michigan	Democratic	January 1, 2019	Incumbent
Katie Hobbs	Arizona	Democratic	January 7, 2019	January 2, 2023
Jena Griswold	Colorado	Democratic	January 8, 2019	Incumbent
Ruth R. Hughs	Texas	Republican	August 19, 2019	May 31, 2021
Laurel Lee	Florida	Republican	January 28, 2019	May 16, 2022
Leslie Cummings (acting)	Oregon	Republican	February 26, 2019	March 31, 2019
Bev Clarno	Oregon	Republican	March 31, 2019	January 4, 2021
Holli Sullivan	Indiana	Republican	March 16, 2021	December 31, 2022
Christi Jacobsen	Montana	Republican	January 4, 2021	Incumbent
Shirley Weber	California	Democratic	January 29, 2021	Incumbent
Shenna Bellows	Maine	Democratic	January 4, 2021	Incumbent
Veronica Degraffenreid (acting)	Pennsylvania	Democratic	February 5, 2021	January 8, 2022
Shemia Fagan	Oregon	Democratic	January 4, 2021	May 8, 2023
Kay Coles James	Virginia	Republican	January 15, 2022	August 29, 2023
Monae Johnson	South Dakota	Republican	December 5, 2022	Incumbent
Leigh M. Chapman (acting)	Pennsylvania	Democratic	January 8, 2022	January 17, 2023
Stephanie Thomas	Connecticut	Democratic	January 4, 2023	Incumbent
Jane Nelson	Texas	Republican	January 5, 2023	Incumbent
Sarah Copeland Hanzas	Vermont	Democratic	January 5, 2023	Incumbent
Susan Lee	Maryland	Democratic	January 18, 2023	Incumbent
Sarah Godlewski	Wisconsin	Democratic	March 17, 2023	Incumbent
Cheryl Myers (acting)	Oregon	Democratic	May 8, 2023	June 30, 2023
LaVonne Griffin-Valade	Oregon	Democratic	June 30, 2023	January 6, 2025
Kelly Gee	Virginia	Republican	September 1, 2023	January 17, 2026
Nancy Landry	Louisiana	Republican	January 8, 2024	Incumbent
Charuni Patibanda-Sanchez	Delaware	Democratic	January 28, 2025	Incumbent
Candi King	Virginia	Democratic	January 17, 2026	Incumbent
Amanda Lopez Askin	New Mexico	Democratic	January 4, 2027	elect

== List of female lieutenant governors ==
Certain states do not have a secretary of state; instead the lieutenant governor is responsible for those duties.

Officeholder	State	Party	Assumed office	Term end
Jean King	Hawaii	Democratic	December 2, 1978	December 2, 1982
Olene Walker	Utah	Republican	January 4, 1993	November 5, 2003
Mazie Hirono	Hawaii	Democratic	December 2, 1994	December 2, 2002
Fran Ulmer	Alaska	Democratic	December 5, 1994	December 2, 2002
Valerie Davidson	Alaska	Independent	October 16, 2018	December 3, 2018
Deidre Henderson	Utah	Republican	2021	
Nancy Dahlstrom	Alaska	Republican	2022	
Sylvia Luke	Hawaii	Democratic	2023	

== Female territorial secretaries of state ==
Officeholder	Territory	Party	Assumed office	Term end
Lauren Vaughan	District of Columbia	Democratic	January 2, 2015	December 11, 2018
