= 2026 New Mexico Secretary of State election =

- November 3, 2026
Nominee	Amanda López Askin	Ramona Goolsby
Party	Democratic	Republican
Popular vote	436,638	279,965
Percentage	60.9%	39.1%
Secretary of State before election
Maggie Toulouse Oliver
Democratic
Elected Secretary of State
Amanda López Askin
Democratic

The 2026 New Mexico Secretary of State election was held on November 3, 2026, to elect the Secretary of State of New Mexico. Incumbent Democratic secretary Maggie Toulouse Oliver is term-limited, and instead ran for lieutenant governor. Primary elections were held on June 2, 2026.

== Democratic primary ==
=== Candidates ===
==== Nominee ====
- Amanda López Askin, Doña Ana County Clerk

==== Eliminated in primary ====
- Katharine Clark, Santa Fe County Clerk

==== Disqualified ====
- Sonya Smith, former secretary of the New Mexico Department of Veterans Services

=== Endorsements ===
Katharine Clark

State legislators

- Christine Chandler, state representative from the 43rd district (2019–present)

Organizations

- 314 Action
Amanda López Askin

U.S. senators

- Martin Heinrich, New Mexico (2013–present)

U.S. representatives

- Gabe Vasquez, NM-02 (2023–present)

Organizations

- New Mexico Working Families Party
- Vote Mama

=== Results ===
Primary results by county: Askin: 50–60%; 60–70%; 70–80%; Clark: 50–60%; 60–70%

Democratic primary results
Party	Candidate	Votes	%
Democratic	Amanda López Askin	108,159	53.2
Democratic	Katharine Clark	95,372	46.8
Total votes		203,531	100.0

== Republican primary ==
=== Candidates ===
==== Nominee ====
- Ramona Goolsby, retired nurse practitioner and veteran

Republican primary results
Party	Candidate	Votes	%
Republican	Ramona Goolsby	96,620	100.0
Total votes		96,620	100.0

== General election ==
=== Predictions ===
Source	Ranking	As of
Sabato's Crystal Ball	Safe D	August 7, 2025

=== Post-primary endorsements ===
Amanda López Askin (D)

Organizations

- EMILYs List

=== Results ===
2026 New Mexico Secretary of State election
Party	Candidate	Votes	%	±%
Democratic	Amanda López Askin			
Republican	Ramona L. Goolsby			
Total votes			100.0	

== See also ==
- 2026 United States secretary of state elections
- Secretary of State of New Mexico
