= Salvador Armijo House =

Historic house in New Mexico, United States

- U.S. National Register of Historic Places
- NM State Register of Cultural Properties
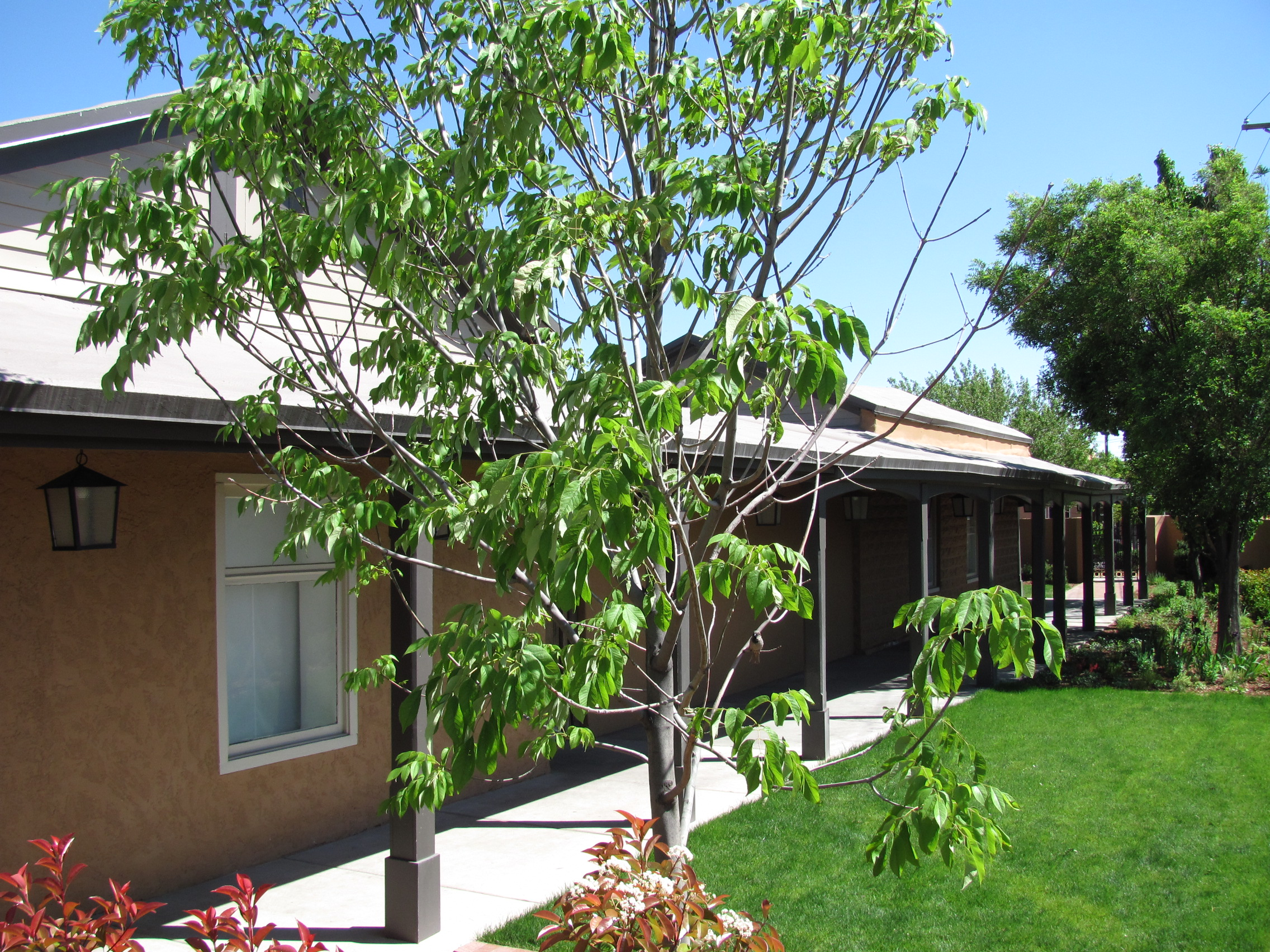
- The house in 2010

- Location within New Mexico Location within the United States
- Location: 618 Rio Grande Blvd. NW, Albuquerque, New Mexico
- Coordinates: 35°5′58″N 106°40′10″W
- Built: c. 1840
- NRHP reference No.: 76001191
- NMSRCP No.: 380

Significant dates
- Added to NRHP: October 8, 1976
- Designated NMSRCP: June 20, 1975

The Salvador Armijo House is a historic hacienda in the Old Town neighborhood of Albuquerque, New Mexico. It was originally built in the 1840s by Salvador Armijo (1823–1879), a prosperous merchant who was the nephew of Governor Manuel Armijo. The house remained in the Armijo family for five generations and was remodeled or expanded several times, most notably in the 1870s and the early 1900s. Armijo's great-granddaughter Soledad C. Chacón, the future New Mexico Secretary of State, was a resident there in the early 1900s. During the mid-20th century, much of the building was converted into apartments. It was listed on the New Mexico State Register of Cultural Properties in 1975 and the National Register of Historic Places in 1976.

In 1977, Armijo's great-great-granddaughter Frances Wilson sold the house and it was turned into a restaurant, named Maria Theresa after the well-known silver coin. The restaurant closed in 2004. In 2009, the building was purchased by the adjoining Hotel Albuquerque and turned into a party and reception venue. As of 2024, the building is used primarily as a wedding venue, styled as Casa Esencia.

The architecture of the house reflects various alterations made by its inhabitants in order to keep up with changing tastes and fashions. As originally constructed, the house consisted of 12 rooms arranged around a central courtyard, occupying a footprint of 100 by 70 feet (30 by 21 m). The walls are 32 inches (81 cm) thick and mostly constructed from adobe, though stone was used in some sections. The original house had very few windows and was entered via zaguanes or covered passageways. The 1875 remodeling enclosed the zaguanes to form hallways and added new portales (porticoes) and windows with Territorial style wooden trim. In the early 1900s, most of the west side of the house was demolished and a new addition was built on the south side. New portales, pitched roofs with ornamented pediments, and a cast stone veneer (now removed) were also added to the exterior.
