= Amanda López Askin =

American politician

Secretary of State-elect of New Mexico
- Assuming office January 1, 2027
- Governor: Deb Haaland (elect)
- Succeeding: Maggie Toulouse Oliver

Personal details
- Born: 1973 or 1974 (age 52–53) New Mexico, U.S.
- Party: Democratic
- Education: New Mexico State University (BS, MS, PhD)

Amanda López Askin (born 1973/1974) is an American politician from New Mexico. She is the Secretary of State-elect of New Mexico.

López Askin is the county clerk of Doña Ana County, New Mexico. She ran for Secretary of State of New Mexico in the 2026 election as a member of the Democratic Party. She won the November general election.

Political offices
Preceded by Maggie Toulouse Oliver	Secretary of State of New Mexico; Taking office 2027	Elect
Party political offices
Preceded by Maggie Toulouse Oliver	Democratic nominee for Secretary of State of New Mexico; 2026	Most recent
