= Stephanie Gonzales =

American politician

21st New Mexico Secretary of State
- In office 1991–1998
- Governor: Bruce King; Gary Johnson
- Preceded by: Rebecca Vigil-Giron
- Succeeded by: Mary Herrera

Personal details
- Born: 1950 (age 75–76)
- Party: Democratic

Stephanie Gonzales (born 1950) is an American politician and government official who served as the 21st New Mexico secretary of state from 1991 to 1998.

== Career ==
Gonzales began her career in the New Mexico secretary of state's office in 1987, serving as a deputy under Rebecca Vigil-Giron. Gonzalez was elected as secretary of state in 1990 and assumed office in 1991. In 1994, Gonzales testified before the United States House Administration Subcommittee on Elections on techniques to decrease voter fraud.

Gonzalez served on the Commission on White House Fellowships during the administration of Bill Clinton. In 1998, she was an unsuccessful candidate for lieutenant governor of New Mexico. In 1999, Clinton appointed Gonzales as a regional director of the United States Department of Agriculture. In 2006, Gonzales was an unsuccessful candidate for New Mexico secretary of state. Gonzales later served as the director of the New Mexico Human Services Department's Child Support Enforcement Division.
