= Jennie Fortune =

American politician (1895–1996)

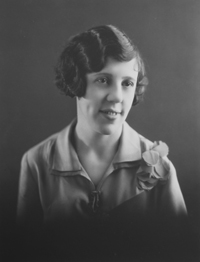

4th New Mexico Secretary of State
- In office 1927–1928
- Governor: Richard C. Dillon
- Preceded by: Soledad Chacón
- Succeeded by: E. A. Perrault

Personal details
- Born: March 22, 1895 Socorro, New Mexico
- Died: April 10, 1996 (aged 101)
- Party: Democratic

Jennie Fortune (March 22, 1895 – April 10, 1996) was an American politician who served as the fourth Secretary of State of New Mexico.

== Biography ==
Jennie Fortune was born in Socorro, New Mexico, on March 22, 1895, the daughter of Edward Lawrence Fortune (b. 1863) and Maria Guadalupe Baca (b. July 23, 1868). Edward Lawrence Fortune was the son of Patrick Fortune. Patrick Fortune is buried in front of the altar under the floor of the Lemitar Church. Patrick was an emigrant from Ireland. In 1849 he enlisted in the U.S. Army in New York with the expectation of traveling to the gold fields in California. Instead, his regiment of dragoons ended up stationed from Albuquerque to Doña Ana. He remained in the Lemitar area, marrying Irish born Theresa Stapleton in 1861. Patrick Fortune died at only 37 years old, and due to his involvement with the Lemitar Church, became the first person to be buried near the altar inside the Sagrada Familia church. Jennie Fortune's nephew was Archbishop Robert Fortune Sanchez, son of her sister Priscilla.

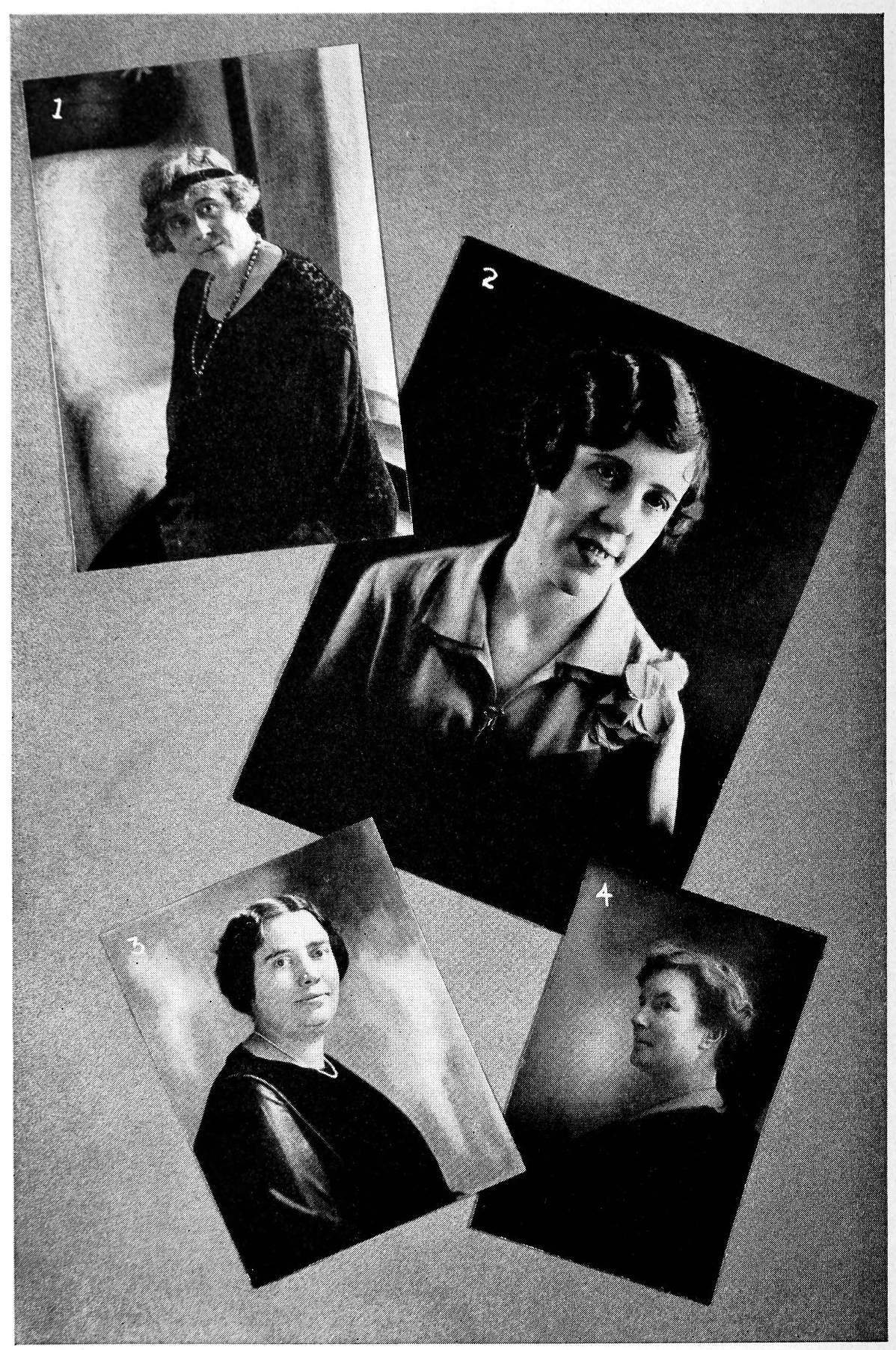
A Few of the Eminent Women of New Mexico, Blanche C. Grant, Jennie Fortune, Margaret Reeves, Maude Hancock Prichard

In the early 1920s Jennie Fortune ran on the Democratic ticket and became County Clerk of Socorro County. From 1927 to 1928 she was Secretary of State under Governor Richard Dillon. She was New Mexico 4th Secretary of State and the second woman. She predicted that, if she won, the position would always be held by a woman and up until her death in 1996 that is what happened (the first man after her was Brad Winter in 2015). She held various political offices and served as Deputy Sheriff of Socorro County.

She was member of: Capital City Business and Professional Women's Club, National Federation of Business and Professional Women's Club.

During World War II she worked for a Colonel at Luke Air Force Base, in Phoenix, Arizona.

She managed and co-owned the Fashion Shop in Socorro for more than 20 years.

She died on April 10, 1996, at 101 years old, and is buried at San Miguel Cemetery, Socorro.

Political offices
Preceded by Soledad C. Chacón	Secretary of State of New Mexico; 1927–1928	Succeeded by E. A. Perrault
