= Clara Padilla Jones =

American politician

19th Secretary of State of New Mexico
- In office 1983–1986
- Governor: Toney Anaya
- Preceded by: Shirley Hooper
- Succeeded by: Rebecca Vigil-Giron

Personal details
- Political party: Democratic

Clara Padilla Jones was an American politician and businesswoman who served as the 19th secretary of state of New Mexico from 1983 to 1986.

== Career ==
Padilla Jones was previously the chair of the Bernalillo County, New Mexico Democratic Party. During her tenure as secretary of state, she was a member of the National Association of Secretaries of State executive committee. Outside of politics, Padilla Jones worked as a realtor.
