= Brad Winter =

American politician

25th Secretary of State of New Mexico
- In office December 18, 2015 – December 9, 2016
- Governor: Susana Martinez
- Preceded by: Mary Quintana (Acting)
- Succeeded by: Maggie Toulouse Oliver

Member of the Albuquerque City Council from the 4th district
- In office January 1, 1999 – December 31, 2019
- Preceded by: Sam Bregman
- Succeeded by: Brook Bassan

Personal details
- Born: 1952 (age 73–74)
- Party: Republican
- Education: University of Oklahoma; University of New Mexico, Albuquerque

Brad Winter is an American politician from the state of New Mexico. He served as the 25th Secretary of State of New Mexico from December 18, 2015 to December 9, 2016, being appointed to the position by New Mexico Governor Susana Martinez following the resignation of former Secretary of State Dianna Duran, and was a member of the Albuquerque City Council for 7 consecutive terms, including three terms as council president, from 1999 to 2019. He served Albuquerque's far northeast heights, which became a reliably Republican stronghold.

== Career ==
Winter worked as a teacher and rose to principal in Albuquerque Public Schools (APS). In 1999, he ran for Albuquerque City Council and defeated Sam Bregman, local lawyer and Democratic activist. Winter would become the chief operating officer of APS, a post he held for almost 5 years after resigning in 2014. Three months later, he was appointed as the interim Superintendent of APS. He was sworn in as Secretary of State on December 15, 2015, following the resignation of Dianna Duran, serving until December 9, 2016. Winter did not resign his City Council seat during that time, nor did he run for the remainder of Duran's term in the November 2016 special election, which was won by Democrat Maggie Toulouse Oliver.

In 2019, Winter said he would not seek re-election to the City Council.

Political offices
| Preceded by Mary Quintana; Acting | New Mexico Secretary of State; 2015-2016 | Succeeded by Maggie Toulouse Oliver |
