= Beatrice Roach Gottlieb =

American politician (1919–2011)

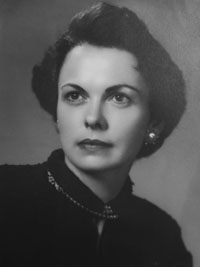

11th New Mexico Secretary of State
- In office 1951–1954
- Governor: Edwin L. Mechem
- Preceded by: Alicia Valdez Romero
- Succeeded by: Natalie Smith Buck

Personal details
- Born: April 15, 1919 Mountainair, New Mexico, U.S.
- Died: October 8, 2011 (aged 92)
- Party: Democratic

Beatrice Roach Gottlieb (April 15, 1919 – October 8, 2011) was an American politician who served as the Secretary of State of New Mexico from 1951 to 1954.

She was raised in Mountainair, New Mexico. In 1950, she declared her candidacy for the office of secretary of state. Then known as Beatrice Bassett Roach, she first took office at the age of 32, and was the youngest person in the United States to serve as a secretary of state at the time. Gottlieb's second term ended in 1954, and she was succeeded by Natalie Smith Buck. Gottlieb ran for a third term in 1957, but lost to Betty Fiorina.

Political offices
Preceded by Alicia Valdez Romero	Secretary of State of New Mexico; 1951–1954	Succeeded by Natalie Smith Buck
