= Ernestine D. Evans =

American politician

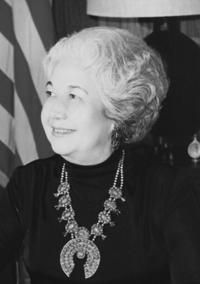

15th and 17th New Mexico Secretary of State
- In office 1967–1970
- Governor: David Cargo
- Preceded by: Alberta Miller
- Succeeded by: Betty Fiorina
- In office 1975–1978
- Governor: Jerry Apodaca
- Preceded by: Betty Fiorina
- Succeeded by: Shirley Hooper

Personal details
- Born: September 17, 1917 Alamosa, Colorado, U.S.
- Died: June 9, 2010 (aged 92)
- Party: Democratic

Ernestine B. Durán Evans (September 17, 1917 – June 9, 2010) (Note: An obituary published in 2010 states that Evans was born on September 5, 1917. An article published in the Santa Fe New Mexican reported that Evans was 92 when she died. Telgen gives Evans' birth year as 1927.), also known as Ernestine Griego, was an American educator, legislator and civil servant. She served as Secretary of State of New Mexico from 1967 to 1970 and from 1975 to 1978.

== Early life and education ==
Durán was born in Alamosa, Colorado and grew up on a ranch in El Rito, New Mexico, the daughter of a rancher, Gilbert Durán, and a schoolteacher, Maria Grace. She was educated at the Spanish American Normal School (now Northern New Mexico College), and earned a teaching certificate.

== Career ==
Durán taught school at a lumber camp as a young woman. Her husband Alcadio Griego was running for the state legislature for the Democratic Party in 1941 when he died from spinal meningitis; she was asked by the party to run in his place in the election. She was elected and served a two-year term in the New Mexico House of Representatives. In 1942 she was held hostage by inmates while touring a state penitentiary with her mother.

During World War II she worked as an administrator for a military hospital. In 1945, she became an administrator in the New Mexico land office and, in 1953, manager of finance for the state Board of Education. Evans was administrative secretary for two state governors and a member of the legislative council. In 1966, she was elected Secretary of State, and served two terms from 1967 to 1970. She was elected again in 1974, for a term that ran from 1975 to 1978. She was one of the first Hispanic women to hold statewide office in any US state.

In 1986, she published Turquoise and Coral, a novel set in northern New Mexico. In 2007, Governor Bill Richardson named State Road 554 "Ernestine D. Evans Road" in her honor.

== Personal life ==
Durán married fellow teacher Alcadio Griego in 1939. They had a son, Stanley, born four months before Griego died suddenly in 1941. She married her second husband, Seth L. Evans, in 1945. Evans died in 2010, at the age of 92.

Political offices
Preceded by Alberta Miller	Secretary of State of New Mexico; 1967–1970	Succeeded by Betty Fiorina
Preceded by Betty Fiorina	Secretary of State of New Mexico; 1975–1978	Succeeded by Shirley Hooper
