= Soledad Chacón =

American politician

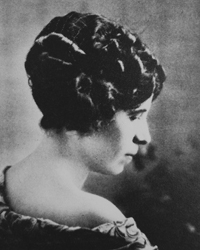

3rd New Mexico Secretary of State
- In office 1923–1926
- Governor: James F. Hinkle; Arthur T. Hannett
- Preceded by: Manuel Martínez
- Succeeded by: Jennie Fortune

Personal details
- Born: August 10, 1890 Albuquerque, New Mexico, U.S.
- Died: August 4, 1936 (aged 45) Albuquerque, New Mexico, U.S.
- Party: Democratic

Soledad Chávez de Chacón (August 10, 1890 – August 4, 1936) was an American politician who served as the third Secretary of State of New Mexico, the first woman elected to the office, and the first Hispanic woman elected to statewide office in the United States. She served as acting Governor of New Mexico for two weeks in 1924, becoming the second woman to act as chief executive of a U.S. state.

== Early life and education ==
Soledad Chávez was born in Albuquerque, New Mexico, in 1890. Her parents were Melitón Chávez (1856–1932) and Francisca Baca de Chávez (1864–1923), both members of prominent New Mexico families. She had one older sister, Piedad Chávez Sandoval (1888–1969). The sisters spent part of their childhood at the Salvador Armijo House in Old Town, which was built in the 1840s by their maternal great-grandfather, Salvador Armijo. The house is now listed on the National Register of Historic Places.

Chávez graduated from Albuquerque High School in 1908 and then completed an accounting program at the Albuquerque Business College. She married Ireneo Eduardo Chacón (1885–1969) in 1910 and had two children, Adelina and Santiago.

== Career in politics ==
Chacón was first elected to the office of Secretary of State in 1922, two years after the 19th Amendment guaranteed women the right to vote. The people of New Mexico nicknamed her "Lala" during her time in office. She served another two-year term in 1924.

Chacón became acting governor of New Mexico for two weeks from June 21 to July 5, 1924, when Governor James F. Hinkle left the state to attend the Democratic National Convention in New York City. Lieutenant Governor José A. Baca had died earlier in the year, leaving the Secretary of State next in the line of succession. She was the second woman to serve as chief executive of a U.S. state after Carolyn B. Shelton, who acted as governor of Oregon for three days in 1909. Upon taking office, Chacón told reporters "I am anticipating no serious problems during Governor Hinkle's absence, but should any occur I don't believe I shall have any difficulty in handling them." She undertook several actions as governor, including signing a requisition for New Mexico National Guard funding and issuing a pardon.

She was elected to the New Mexico House of Representatives in 1934, becoming the fourth Hispanic woman to hold that office. She served on several committees, including as chair of Rules and Orders of Business. In 1936, partway through her first term, she died of peritonitis at the age of 46.

== Commemoration ==
In 2025, Chacón was honored by Albuquerque by being named a “Breakthrough New Mexican”, and a plaque was dedicated to her at the Albuquerque International Sunport.

Political offices
Preceded by Manuel Martínez	Secretary of State of New Mexico; 1923–1926	Succeeded by Jennie Fortune
