= Shirley Hooper =

American politician

18th New Mexico Secretary of State
- In office 1979–1982
- Governor: Bruce King
- Preceded by: Ernestine Durán Evans
- Succeeded by: Clara Padilla Jones

Personal details
- Born: November 5, 1935 Meadow, Texas, U.S.
- Died: October 24, 2014 (aged 78) Roswell, New Mexico, U.S.
- Party: Democratic

Shirley M. (née Collier) Hooper-Garcia (November 5, 1935 – October 24, 2014) was an American politician who served as the 18th New Mexico Secretary of State.

== Early life and education ==
Born in Meadow, Texas, Hooper moved to Lovington, New Mexico with her family in 1939. She graduated from Lovington High School in 1953 and then from the New Mexico Real Estate Institute. She also attended New Mexico Junior College in 1989.

== Career ==
Hooper served as secretary of the speaker of the New Mexico House of Representatives and was assistant chief clerk. Hooper was legal secretary to two judges of the New Mexico Court of Appeals. In 1988, she was elected clerk of Lea County, New Mexico. Hooper served as the Secretary of State of New Mexico from 1979 to 1982.

== Death ==
Hooper died at her home in Roswell, New Mexico.

Political offices
Preceded by Ernestine Durán Evans	Secretary of State of New Mexico; 1979–1982	Succeeded by Clara Padilla Jones
