= Maggie Toulouse Oliver =

American politician (born c. 1976)

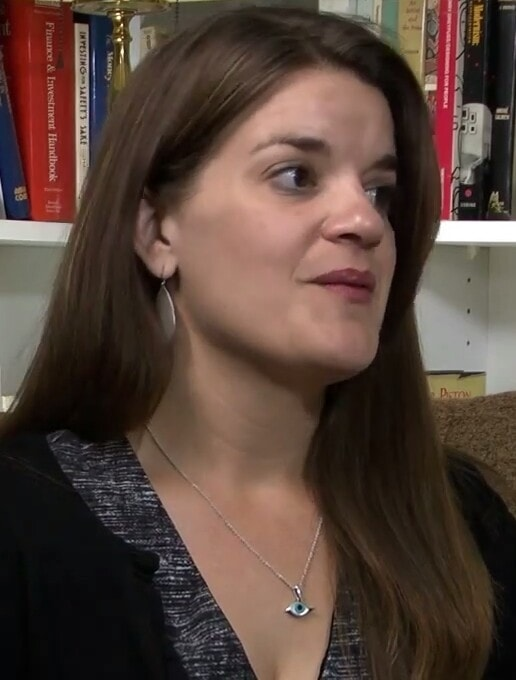
- Toulouse Oliver in 2014

26th Secretary of State of New Mexico
- Incumbent
- Assumed office December 9, 2016
- Governor: Susana Martinez; Michelle Lujan Grisham
- Preceded by: Brad Winter

Personal details
- Born: 1975 or 1976 (age 50–51) Los Angeles, California, U.S.
- Party: Democratic
- Education: University of New Mexico (BA, MA)

Maggie Toulouse Oliver (born 1975/1976) is an American politician from the state of New Mexico. She is the 26th Secretary of State of New Mexico and a member of the Democratic Party. Prior to serving as Secretary of State, Toulouse Oliver was the county clerk for Bernalillo County. On April 24, 2019, Toulouse Oliver declared her candidacy for the 2020 U.S. Senate election, but she later withdrew.

== Early life and career ==
Oliver was born around 1976 in Los Angeles but is described as a "lifelong resident" of New Mexico. She graduated from Highland High School in Albuquerque, New Mexico, in 1994, and earned her bachelor's degree in Political Science and Spanish, and her master's degree in Political Science, at the University of New Mexico. She worked as the New Mexico state director for the League of Conservation Voters, and as a political consultant and community organizer.

== Political career ==
=== Bernalillo County Clerk ===
Toulouse Oliver was appointed as the county clerk of Bernalillo County, New Mexico, by the county commission on January 2, 2007, to fill the unexpired term of Mary Herrera, who was elected New Mexico Secretary of State in November 2006.

As county clerk, Toulouse Oliver created a smartphone app that provides users with information about voting, such as directions to their closest voting center, hours of operation, and information about the length of the wait in line to vote. Toulouse Oliver also lead the implementation of voting centers in Bernalillo County, in an effort to reduce wait times and the need for provisional ballots.

=== New Mexico Secretary of State ===
Following the resignation of Dianna Duran as Secretary of State, Toulouse Oliver defeated Republican Nora Espinoza in the November 2016 special election to fill the remainder of the term. She was sworn into the position on December 9, 2016.

As Secretary of State, Toulouse Oliver has modernized the voter registration system in New Mexico, and advocated for automatic voter registration and same-day voter registration, both of which are now law in the state. Toulouse Oliver also instituted New Mexico's first sexual harassment prevention trainings for lobbyists.

She has advocated for and enacted stronger campaign finance disclosure rules, bringing greater transparency to independent political spending in New Mexico. Toulouse Oliver has lobbied and advocated for open primary elections and ranked choice voting.

Toulouse Oliver founded New Mexico's Native American Voting Task Force, which works to increase voter turnout in Native American communities in New Mexico. The task force has worked together with the League of Women Voters to create voter guides for use in native communities. Toulouse Oliver also refused to turn over voter information to President Trump's Advisory Commission on Election Integrity, citing security, legal, and privacy concerns related to voters’ confidential information such as Social Security numbers, birthdates, and voting history.

Toulouse Oliver has advocated for elections security, and has ensured that the state of New Mexico employs many election security best practices, including the use of paper ballots and post-election audits. The office of the Secretary of State recently created a full-time dedicated cybersecurity staffer to “make sure [people] know that their votes are counted and their voices are heard." In 2018, Toulouse Oliver testified as an expert witness before the U.S. House Oversight and Government Reform Committee on elections security and cybersecurity issues. In 2017, she was a founding member of the Elections Government Sector Coordinating Council, which works with the Department of Homeland Security to inform policy on elections as critical national infrastructure.

Toulouse Oliver sits on the board of the New Mexico Martin Luther King Jr. Commission, the Public Employees Retirement Association board, and the Commission of Public Records board.

In November 2024, after the presidential election, Toulouse Oliver accused state representative John Block of encouraging online harassment she had received. Block said he too had been harassed, and said, "If it gets to violent threats like you described that you got, I apologize that that is happening to you."

=== Awards and recognition ===
In 2016, Toulouse Oliver was named one of the EMILY's List Gabrielle Giffords Award nominees.

As New Mexico's Secretary of State, Toulouse Oliver was named the Treasurer and Elections Committee Co-Chair of the National Association of Secretaries of State, and was awarded Election Administrator of the Year by FairVote, both in 2018. Her office was awarded the New Mexico Family Friendly Business Award in 2017, 2018, and 2019. She was awarded the Election Assistance Commission's annual “Clearie” award in February 2019 for her work to make elections more accessible to blind and visually impaired voters.

In 2018, she was named as a W.K. Kellogg Foundation Leadership Network Fellow, and in 2019 she was named as a Hunt-Kean Leadership Fellow at the Hunt Institute.

=== United States Senate campaign ===
Toulouse Oliver was seen as a potential 2020 candidate for the United States Senate. After Tom Udall announced that he would not seek re-election in 2020, Toulouse Oliver said she was "seriously considering" a run for the Senate seat, and launched her campaign on April 24, 2019. On October 29, 2019, Toulouse Oliver dropped out of the race, endorsing her former rival Ben Ray Luján, who went on to win the election.

=== New Mexico lieutenant governor campaign ===
In October 2025, Toulouse Oliver announced her candidacy for lieutenant governor of New Mexico in the 2026 election. Toulouse Oliver won the Democratic nomination on June 2, 2026. On June 18, she suspended her campaign due to health concerns.

== Electoral history ==
| Year | Office | Type | Votes for Oliver | % | Opponent | Party | Votes | % |
|---|---|---|---|---|---|---|---|---|
| 2014 | Secretary of State | Primary | 97,323 | 100 | | | | |
| 2014 | Secretary of State | General | 245,508 | 48.36 | Dianna Duran | Republican | 262,117 | 51.64 |
| 2016 (special) | Secretary of State | Primary | 172,837 | 100 | | | | |
| 2016 (special) | Secretary of State | General | 423,938 | 56.59 | Nora Espinoza | Republican | 325,231 | 43.41 |
| 2018 | Secretary of State | Primary | 148,545 | 100 | | | | |
| 2018 | Secretary of State | General | 399,134 | 57.76 | Gavin Clarkson | Republican | 257,306 | 37.24 |
| 2022 | Secretary of State | Primary | 120,492 | 100 | | | | |
| 2022 | Secretary of State | General | 384,526 | 54.5 | Audrey Trujillo | Republican | 300,763 | 42.6 |

Political offices
| Preceded by Brad Winter | Secretary of State of New Mexico; 2016–present | Incumbent |
Party political offices
| Preceded by Mary Herrera | Democratic nominee for Secretary of State of New Mexico; 2014, 2016, 2018, 2022 | Succeeded by Amanda López Askin |
| Preceded by Howie Morales | Democratic nominee for Lieutenant Governor of New Mexico; Withdrew; 2026 | Succeeded by Stephanie Garcia Richard |
