= Dianna Duran =

American politician

24th Secretary of State of New Mexico
- In office January 1, 2011 – October 22, 2015
- Governor: Susana Martinez
- Preceded by: Mary Herrera
- Succeeded by: Mary Quintana (Acting)

Member of the New Mexico Senate from the 40th district
- In office January 1, 1992 – January 1, 2010
- Succeeded by: Bill Burt

Personal details
- Born: July 26, 1956 (age 70) Tularosa, New Mexico, U.S.
- Party: Republican
- Spouse: Leo Barraza
- Education: New Mexico State University, Alamogordo

Dianna Duran (born July 26, 1956) is an American politician who served as the 24th Secretary of State of New Mexico. A Republican, she was the first member of her party in 80 years to serve in the position. On October 22, 2015, she resigned her position amid a corruption and campaign law investigation. She subsequently pleaded guilty to six of 65 fraud and embezzlement charges against her as part of an agreement reached with the Attorney General of New Mexico. Duran was sentenced to 30 days in jail and began her sentence on December 18, 2015.

She was previously a New Mexico State Senator from District 40, first elected in 1992.

== Family ==
Duran began her political career as a deputy county clerk in Otero County and served from 1988 to 1992 as Otero County Clerk. In 1993, she became a member of the New Mexico Senate and remained there until 2010, when she won election as Secretary of State Duran, a New Mexico native and resident of Tularosa, New Mexico, is married to Leo Barraza; they have five children.

== Education ==
Duran was born in Tularosa, New Mexico, and attended public schools there, graduating from Tularosa High School in 1973. She attended New Mexico State University.

== Career ==
Duran attended New Mexico State University in Alamogordo before beginning work in the Office of the Otero County Clerk in 1979. Elected county clerk in 1988, she served two consecutive two-year terms. In 1992, she was elected to the New Mexico Senate, serving until 2010, when she resigned after being elected Secretary of State on November 2. While in the Senate Duran pushed for legislation requiring citizens to produce photo ID before they could vote.

On January 1, 2011, Duran became New Mexico's 24th Secretary of State. She was the first Republican elected to that office since 1928. She promised initiatives to modernize and streamline operations and cut costs. She said her primary objective was the integrity of the electoral system and that she believed that in a republic, legitimacy rested on the people's belief that elections are conducted fairly, votes are counted correctly, and that only eligible voters are allowed to participate. On July 31, 2011, Duran cited a "culture of corruption" when she turned the names of 64,000 voters over to the state police, saying they did not match the Social Security and motor vehicle data bases. She also said that 117 foreign nationals had registered to vote and 37 had actually done so. The American Civil Liberties Union filed a public information request for the records in question, saying that they wanted to verify the statement. But Duran refused, citing executive privilege.

Eventually the figures were amended: actually, two foreign nationals had registered to vote, and of the two only one had actually voted, apparently accidentally. In 2014 Duran won reelection, outspending challenger Bernalillo County Clerk Maggie Toulouse Oliver $195,635 to $145,690 on television ads alone. In 2015 she testified in favor of HB340 before the Legislature's Judiciary Committee. The bill, which would have mandated a requirement for voter ID, did pass out of committee on a party-line vote, but died on the floor of the Legislature.

In addition to bringing New Mexico into compliance with federal mandates regarding removal of ineligible voters from the rolls, as the chief elections officer of the state, Secretary Duran ended the established practice of single party voting (straight-ticket voting).

== Fraud and embezzlement charges ==
On August 27, 2015, New Mexico Attorney General Hector Balderas charged Duran with 64 violations in a criminal complaint, including fraud, embezzlement, money laundering, campaign law violations, tampering with public records, conspiracy, and violating the Governmental Conduct Act. The complaint alleged that Duran illegally used campaign funds for personal use. Duran's lawyer responded: "we have identified some serious potential violations of law by the New Mexico Attorney General's Office, in conducting the investigation." On October 2, 2015, Duran was also charged with identity theft, her 65th charge, for listing former state Sen. Don Kidd as her 2010 campaign treasurer, although he publicly said he had no knowledge of this and played no such role. On October 23, 2015, Duran entered into a plea deal, entering a guilty plea to six of the 65 charges against her. Under the terms of the plea agreement, Duran kept her pension from the State of New Mexico Public Employees Retirement System.

=== Resignation and guilty plea ===
Duran resigned from office late October 25, and formally entered her guilty plea October 26. Sentencing was at the court's discretion, but as part of the agreement, she was barred from future handling of, and responsibility for, public money. Two of the charges are felonies, and felons cannot hold public office in New Mexico. The most serious charge is that while in office and responsible for enforcing campaign finance law, Duran misreported and under-reported campaign contributions from Mack Energy Exploration, an oil energy exploration company based in Artesia, New Mexico. The agreement leaves open the potential for counseling; at least some of the embezzlement charges stemmed from her use of campaign accounts at Sandia Casino.

=== Sentencing ===
On December 15, 2015, Duran was sentenced to 30 days in jail and was ordered to pay $28,000 in fines and restitution. As part of her plea deal, the judge also ordered Duran to complete 2,000 hours of community service, write letters of apology to New Mexicans and campaign donors, and make 144 speeches to school groups and civic groups about her crimes. She was also ordered to continue to attend gambling addiction therapy and forbidden to enter a casino or race track for five years. She began her 30-day sentence on December 18, 2015.

== Electoral history ==
Duran defeated incumbent Mary Herrera of the Democratic Party on November 2, 2010, becoming the first Republican elected to the position since 1928. Duran ran for re-election as Secretary of State in 2014, and won the general election on November 4, 2014, beating Bernalillo County Clerk Maggie Toulouse Oliver.

Prior to her election, Duran was a member of the New Mexico State Senate, representing the 40th District from 1993 to 2011. She was elected as Otero County Clerk in 1988, serving two terms.

- 1988, Elected as Otero County clerk (two terms)
- 1992, Elected as a State Senator, served till 2010
- 2010, Elected as Secretary of State

2010 Secretary of State general election results
Party	Candidate	Votes	%
Republican	Dianna Duran	339,551	57.62
Democratic	Mary Herrera	249,778	42.38
Total votes		589,329	100.00
Republican gain from Democratic			

2014 Secretary of State general election results
Party	Candidate	Votes	%
Republican	Dianna Duran	262,117	51.64
Democratic	Maggie Toulouse Oliver	245,508	48.36
Total votes		507,625	100.00
Republican hold			

== Footnotes ==
Political offices
Preceded by Mary Herrera	Secretary of State of New Mexico; 2011–2015	Succeeded by Mary Quintana; Acting
