= Betty Fiorina =

American politician

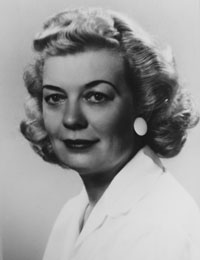

13th and 16th New Mexico Secretary of State
- In office 1959–1962
- Governor: John Burroughs
- Preceded by: Natalie Smith Buck
- Succeeded by: Alberta Miller
- In office 1971–1974
- Governor: Bruce King
- Preceded by: Ernestine Durán Evans
- Succeeded by: Ernestine Durán Evans

Personal details
- Born: October 10, 1919 El Paso, Texas
- Died: February 25, 2010 (aged 90) Santa Fe, New Mexico
- Party: Democratic

Marian Elizabeth Fiorina (October 10, 1919 – February 25, 2010) was an American politician who served three terms as Secretary of State of New Mexico. She was elected to two consecutive terms between 1959 and 1962, and succeeded Ernestine D. Evans in 1970. She left office in 1974, when Evans was reelected.

== Career ==
Marian Elizabeth Fiorina was a native of El Paso, Texas, born to Delphine Sauders and Jules Vicknair Sr. She moved to New Mexico, married Anthony Fiorina, and began working for the New Mexico House of Representatives by 1951 as a deputy chief clerk. First elected as secretary of state in 1958, she won a second term in 1960. During her first stint in office, she sought to end political patronage across the state. Fiorina was succeeded by Alberta Miller in 1963. Upon stepping down, Fiorina became the clerk for a state constitutional convention convened in the 1960s. Fiorina won a four-year term as secretary of state in 1970, and left office in 1974. In the following decades, she helped her son Tom win election as a municipal judge in Santa Fe. Fiorina died on February 25, 2010, of Alzheimer's disease, aged 90. A memorial was held on March 3, 2010, and she was interred at Santa Fe National Cemetery.

Political offices
Preceded by Natalie Smith Buck	Secretary of State of New Mexico; 1959–1962	Succeeded by Alberta Miller
Preceded by Ernestine D. Evans	Secretary of State of New Mexico; 1971–1974	Succeeded by Ernestine D. Evans
