= Mary Herrera =

American politician

23rd New Mexico Secretary of State
- In office January 1, 2007 – December 31, 2010
- Governor: Bill Richardson
- Preceded by: Rebecca Vigil-Giron
- Succeeded by: Dianna Duran

Personal details
- Born: August 27, 1959 (age 67) Albuquerque, New Mexico, U.S.
- Party: Democratic
- Education: College of Santa Fe (now Santa Fe University of Art and Design)

Mary Herrera (born August 27, 1959) is an American politician. She is the former New Mexico Secretary of State serving from 2006 to 2010.

A native of Albuquerque, Herrera graduated from West Mesa High School in 1977. She received both her Bachelors and master's degrees in Business Administration from the College of Santa Fe (now currently Santa Fe University of Art and Design). She received a Certificate of Program Administration for Senior Executives from the John F. Kennedy School of Government at Harvard University and various certificates in Labor, Employment, and Benefits Law from the Institute for Applied Management.

Prior to being elected Secretary, Herrera held many offices within the Bernalillo County government. She started her career as a typist, working her way up to an Assistant Comptroller, to the Director of Human Resources. In 2000, she was elected county clerk of Bernalillo county and re-elected in 2004.

As a Democrat, she continued the long line of Democratic Secretaries in the State of New Mexico for over 80 years. However she lost her re-election bid in 2010 to Republican Dianna Duran.

According to New Mexico law, at the time of her tenure, as the Secretary of State, Herrera was second in line of succession for governor after the Lieutenant Governor.

Political offices
Preceded by Rebecca Vigil-Giron	New Mexico Secretary of State; 2007-2011	Succeeded by Dianna Duran
