= Secretary of State of New Mexico =

Constitutional office in New Mexico

- Seal of New Mexico

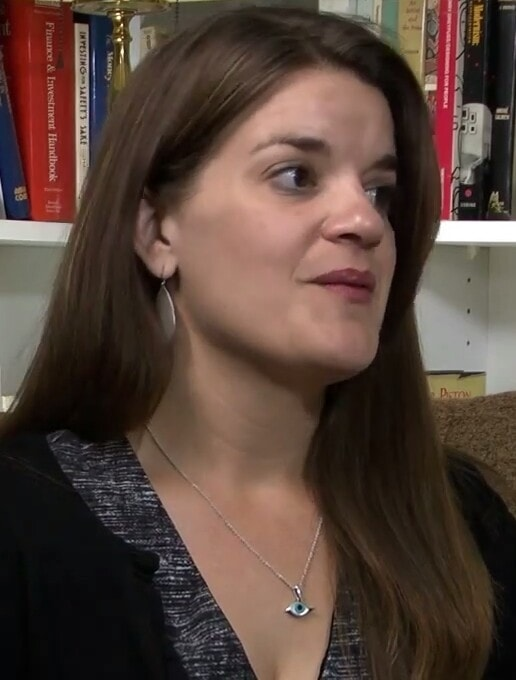
- Incumbent; Maggie Toulouse Oliver since December 9, 2016
- Term length: Four years
- Formation: 1912; 114 years ago
- First holder: Antonio J. Lucero
- Succession: Second
- Website: Secretary of State of New Mexico

The secretary of state of New Mexico is a constitutional officer in the executive branch of government of the U.S. state of New Mexico. Twenty-six individuals have held the office of secretary of state since statehood. Since 1923, every elected New Mexican secretary of state has been a woman. The incumbent is Maggie Toulouse Oliver, a Democrat. Toulouse Oliver's election was forced early due to the resignation of former secretary of state Dianna Duran in October 2015, after criminal charges were filed by the Attorney General's Office alleging Duran converted campaign funds to personal gambling debt.

== Powers and duties ==
The secretary of state is in effect the guarantor of the continuity and stability of good government in New Mexico, with his or her role extending to the enforcement of elections and government ethics laws, the certification, filing, and preservation of legislation, gubernatorial acts, and other instruments vital to the efficient operation of state government, and the registration and regulatory oversight of commerce and industry.

=== Elections administration ===
The Bureau of Elections of the Office of the Secretary of State administers elections and enforces local, state, and federal election laws. The bureau's duties include training county clerks and voting machine technicians, maintaining the state's voter registration database, filing petitions of candidacy for candidates for public office, and administering the Native American Election Information Program, which is a special program to help improve voter registration and voter turnout among the Native American populations within the state.

=== Campaign finance and lobbying regulation ===
The Ethics Division of the Office of the Secretary of State regulates campaign finance and lobbying within the state, and provides campaign finance and lobbying compliance training to various parties involved in government.

=== Commerce and industry ===
The Business Services Division of the Office of the Secretary of State provides various administrative and business-related services to the people of New Mexico. This includes the formation of corporations, limited liability companies, general partnerships, limited partnerships, and limited liability partnerships, the registration of trademarks, and the indexing of security interests under the Uniform Commercial Code and the Food Security Act of 1985. The division is also responsible for licensing notaries public, issuing apostilles, and maintaining the office's computer systems, including the voter registration system managed by the Bureau of Elections.

=== Miscellaneous functions ===
The secretary of state is responsible for filing slip laws, preserving legislative journals, and publishing state agency administrative rules. The secretary also maintains records of referendum petitions, serves as registered agent for service of process on behalf of foreign corporations, and ensures that proposed amendments to the New Mexico Constitution are published in at least one newspaper in every county in the state for four consecutive weeks in both English and Spanish. Moreover, the secretary of state is second in the line of succession after the governor and the lieutenant governor. The secretary of state therefore steps in as acting governor whenever the governor and lieutenant governor are both absent from the state.

== List of New Mexico secretaries of state ==
| # | Image | Name | Took office | Left office | Party |
|---|---|---|---|---|---|
| 1 | | Antonio J. Lucero | 1912 | 1918 | Dem |
| 2 | | Manuel Martínez | 1919 | 1922 | Rep |
| 3 | | Soledad Chacón | 1923 | 1926 | Dem |
| 4 | | Jennie Fortune | 1927 | 1928 | Dem |
| 5 | | E. A. Perrault | 1929 | 1930 | Rep |
| 6 | | Marguerite P. Baca | 1931 | 1934 | Dem |
| 7 | | Elizabeth F. Gonzales | 1935 | 1938 | Dem |
| 8 | | Jessie M. Gonzales | 1939 | 1942 | Dem |
| 9 | | Cecilia T. Cleveland | 1943 | 1946 | Dem |
| 10 | | Alicia Valdez Romero | 1947 | 1950 | Dem |
| 11 | | Beatrice Roach Gottlieb | 1951 | 1954 | Dem |
| 12 | | Natalie Smith Buck | 1955 | 1958 | Dem |
| 13 | | Betty Fiorina | 1959 | 1962 | Dem |
| 14 | | Alberta Miller | 1963 | 1966 | Dem |
| 15 | | Ernestine Durán Evans | 1967 | 1970 | Dem |
| 16 | | Betty Fiorina | 1971 | 1974 | Dem |
| 17 | | Ernestine Durán Evans | 1975 | 1978 | Dem |
| 18 | | Shirley Hooper | 1979 | 1982 | Dem |
| 19 | | Clara Padilla Jones | 1983 | 1986 | Dem |
| 20 | | Rebecca Vigil-Giron | 1987 | 1990 | Dem |
| 21 | | Stephanie Gonzales | 1991 | 1998 | Dem |
| 22 | | Rebecca Vigil-Giron | 1999 | 2006 | Dem |
| 23 | | Mary Herrera | 2007 | 2010 | Dem |
| 24 | | Dianna Duran | 2011 | 2015 | Rep |
| — | | Mary Quintana (Acting) | 2015 | 2015 | |
| 25 | | Brad Winter | 2015 | 2016 | Rep |
| 26 | | Maggie Toulouse Oliver | 2016 | Present | Dem |
