= Rebecca Vigil-Giron =

American politician (born 1954)

20th and 22nd New Mexico Secretary of State
- In office January 1, 1999 – December 31, 2006
- Governor: Bill Richardson
- Preceded by: Stephanie Gonzales
- Succeeded by: Mary Herrera
- In office January 1, 1987 – December 31, 1990
- Governor: Garrey Carruthers
- Preceded by: Clara Padilla Jones
- Succeeded by: Stephanie Gonzales

Personal details
- Born: September 4, 1954 (age 70); Taos, New Mexico, U.S.
- Political party: Democratic
- Education: New Mexico Highlands University (BA)

Rebecca Vigil-Giron (born September 4, 1954) is an American politician who served as the secretary of state of New Mexico from 1987 to 1990 and again from 1999 to 2006. She is the longest-serving Secretary of State in New Mexico history. In 2009, Vigil-Giron was indicted by a grand jury on several counts of embezzlement, but the charges were dropped in 2012.

== Early life and education ==
Rebecca Vigil was born and raised in Taos, New Mexico, Vigil-Giron is an 11th-generation New Mexican. She earned a Bachelor of Arts degree in French and social science from New Mexico Highlands University and is a graduate of the Senior Executives in State and Local Government Program at Harvard University.

== Career ==
Vigil-Giron was first elected New Mexico secretary of state in 1986. Vigil-Giron ran unsuccessfully against Republican Congressman Steve Schiff for a seat in the United States House of Representatives in 1990. She was re-elected New Mexico Secretary of State in 1998 and served through 2006 when she was term-limited.

In 2004, Vigil-Giron became the first Hispanic President in the 100-year history of the National Association of Secretaries of State. She has served as a member of the United States Election Assistance Commission's (EAC) Standards Board and Board of Advisors.

Vigil-Giron once said she became interested in politics after running a successful campaign for homecoming queen at New Mexico Highlands University in 1975. In a 1998 interview she claims to have run a full-fledged campaign for the spot going, "door to dormitory door," with the help of the campus Young Democrats who sponsored her effort.

=== First term as secretary of state ===
After being elected in 1986, she was successful in changing some of New Mexico's restrictive voter registration requirements. New Mexico had the second-most restrictive voter registration requirements in the United States at that time. Voters were required to register 46 days prior to election day to be eligible to vote (only Arizona had more restrictive laws with a 50-day registration requirement). Vigil-Giron campaigned for the law to be amended to a 14-day minimum registration period, but was forced to compromise with New Mexico legislators and the registration requirement was changed to 28 days prior to election day, which is the current law.

=== Between terms ===
Vigil-Giron left office in 1990, limited to one term by New Mexico law. New Mexico would later change that law allowing her to serve two additional terms. Vigil-Giron ran unsuccessfully for Congress against Republican Steve Schiff in 1990, and worked as a consultant for the International Foundation for Electoral Systems (IFES) in Nicaragua, Equatorial Guinea, and the Dominican Republic. She also served as a Member State Delegate with the United Nations in Angola, Africa's presidential elections, and as Executive Director of the New Mexico Commission on the Status of Women.

=== Second and third terms ===
Vigil-Giron made New Mexico history in 2003, by becoming the first Secretary of State in New Mexico elected to three terms. She was elected President of the National Association of Secretaries of State from 2004–2005, the first Latino to serve in that capacity. She served on the Standards Board of the US Election Assistance Commission until 2006. Vigil-Giron aided Governor Bill Richardson in the passage of a paper-ballot requirement in New Mexico in 2006.

Vigil-Giron implemented paper ballots statewide in New Mexico for the 2006 General Election. She was criticised by Republicans in the New Mexico State Legislature for mismanagement of funds for that election. As a result, a full audit of her old office was ordered by NM Governor Bill Richardson. Richardson withdrew his appointment of her as director of the NM Film Museum until she had been cleared of all wrongdoing.

In response Vigil Giron was quoted as saying "It's OK to validate or exonerate the fact that I did everything I was supposed to do.... I did not do anything I was not supposed to do."

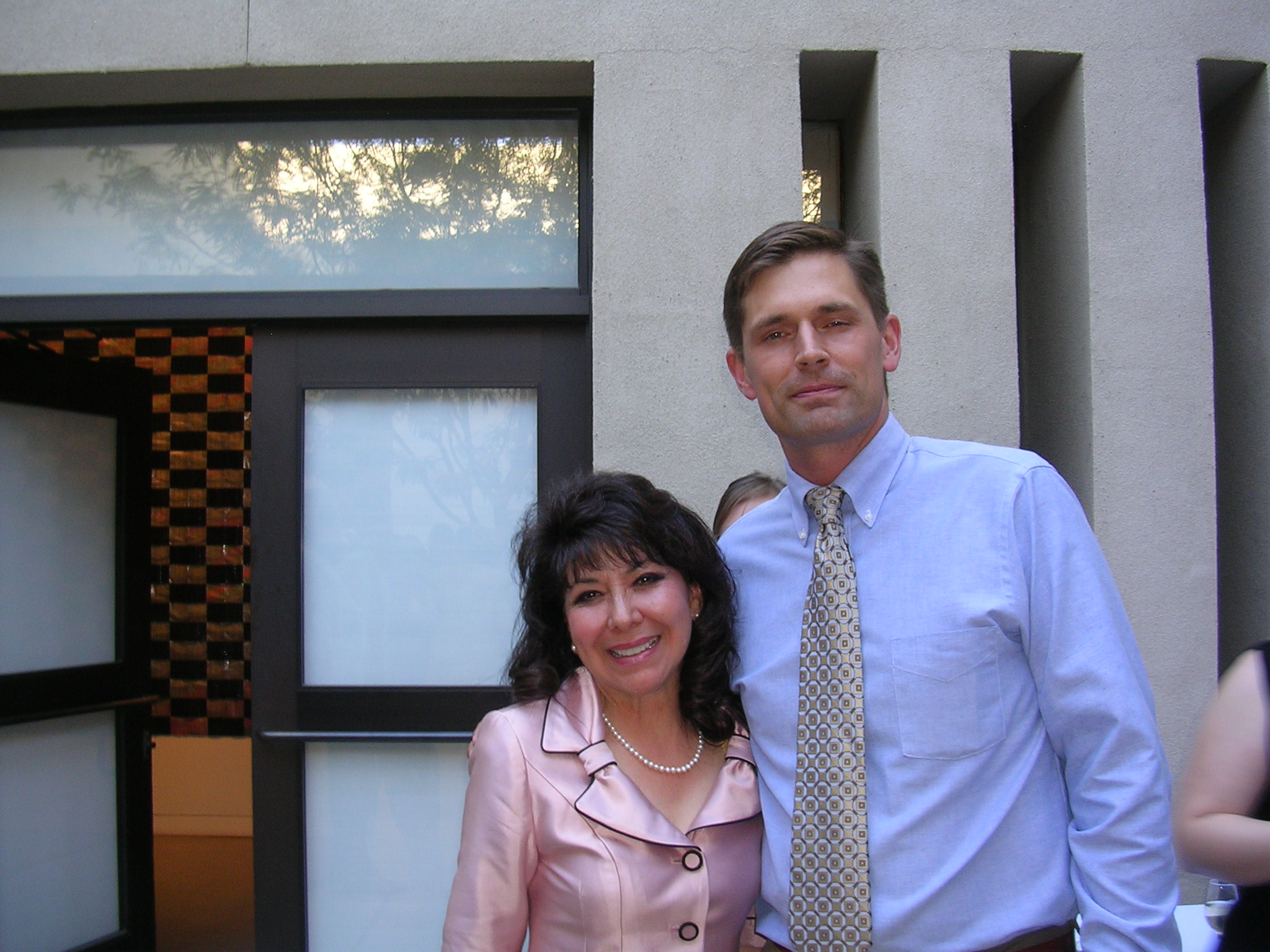
Rebecca Vigil-Giron and Martin Heinrich

She ran for the United States House of Representatives in the 2008 elections, losing in the Democratic primary to Martin Heinrich. He won the Democratic primary on June 3, 2008 with 44% of the vote. Vigil-Giron ranked second with 25% and Michelle Lujan Grisham ranked third with 24% of the vote.

=== Criminal indictment, dismissal, and appeal ===
Vigil-Giron and three others were indicted by a state grand jury in August 2009 on charges related to the alleged embezzlement of federal funds meant for voter education. New Mexico Attorney General Gary King has come under serious scrutiny by the local media for lack of evidence connecting Vigil-Giron to wrongdoing. On March 16, 2011, New Mexico District Judge Albert S. "Pat" Murdoch barred Attorney General Gary King from prosecuting Vigil-Giron's case, citing "perceptions of a conflict of interest".

In November, 2012, New Mexico District Judge Reed Sheppard dropped the charges against Vigil-Giron, ruling that the 39-month delay in bringing the charges to trial weighed heavily against the prosecution. The special prosecutor appealed Judge Sheppard's ruling to the New Mexico Court of Appeals. The appeals court ruled unanimously in favor of Vigil-Giron.

Political offices
Preceded by Clara Padilla Jones	New Mexico Secretary of State; 1987 – 1991	Succeeded by Stephanie Gonzales
Preceded by Stephanie Gonzales	New Mexico Secretary of State; 1999 – 2007	Succeeded by Mary Herrera
