= 2026 New Mexico gubernatorial election =

- November 3, 2026
- Reporting: 95% as of 2:12 AM MST
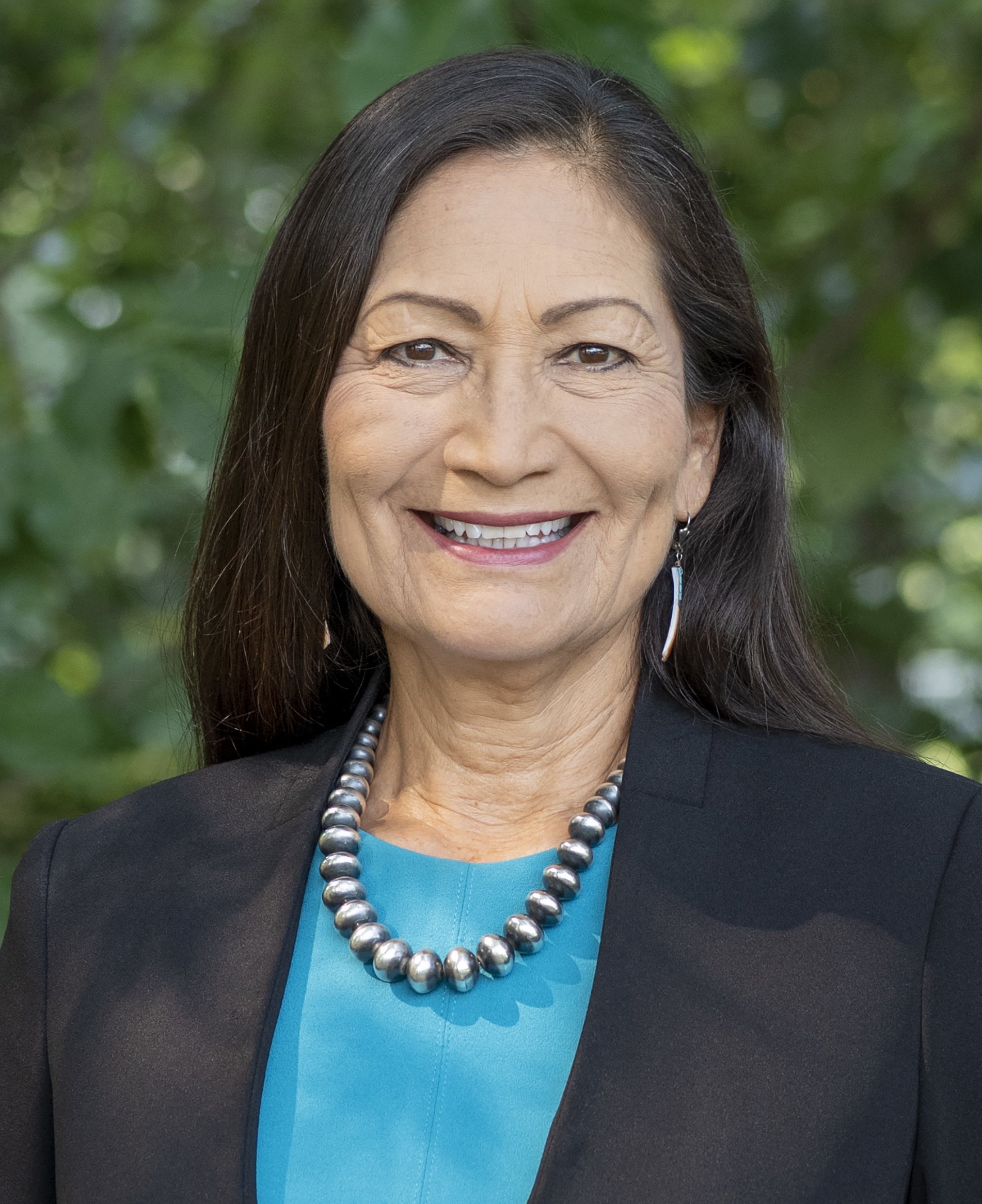

Nominee	Deb Haaland	Gregg Hull
Party	Democratic	Republican
Running mate	Stephanie Garcia Richard (replacing Maggie Toulouse Oliver)	David Gallegos
Popular vote	412,834	308,315
Percentage	57.2%	42.8%
- County results Haaland: 50–60% 60–70% 70–80% Hull: 50–60% 60–70% 70–80%
Governor before election
Michelle Lujan Grisham
Democratic
Elected Governor
Deb Haaland
Democratic

The 2026 New Mexico gubernatorial election was held on November 3, 2026, to elect the governor of New Mexico. Democratic former U.S. Secretary of the Interior Deb Haaland defeated Republican former Rio Rancho Mayor Gregg Hull in the general election. Democratic incumbent Michelle Lujan Grisham was term-limited and ineligible to seek a third consecutive term.

Primary elections took place on June 2. Haaland defeated Bernalillo County district attorney Sam Bregman in the Democratic primary with 72% of the vote. Hull defeated Doug Turner and Duke Rodriguez in the Republican primary with 47% of the vote.

This election was the first New Mexico gubernatorial election since 1978 in which either party won the governorship for three consecutive terms.

== Democratic primary ==
=== Governor ===
==== Candidates ====
===== Nominee =====
- Deb Haaland, former secretary of the interior (2021–2025), former U.S. representative from New Mexico's 1st congressional district (2019–2021), and nominee for lieutenant governor in 2014

===== Eliminated in primary =====
- Sam Bregman, Bernalillo County district attorney (2023–present) and father of MLB player Alex Bregman

===== Withdrawn =====
- Ken Miyagishima, former mayor of Las Cruces (2007–2023) (ran as an independent)

===== Declined =====
- Teresa Leger Fernandez, U.S. representative from New Mexico's 3rd congressional district (2021–present) (endorsed Haaland)
- Martin Heinrich, U.S. senator from New Mexico (2013–present)
- Howie Morales, lieutenant governor of New Mexico (2019–present)
- Raúl Torrez, attorney general of New Mexico (2023–present) (ran for re-election)

==== Endorsements ====
Sam Bregman

Labor unions

- Albuquerque Police Officers Association
- Iron Workers Local 495
- IUPAT District Council 36
- LiUNA Local 16
- Teamsters Local 492

Tribal nations

- Jicarilla Apache
- Ohkay Owingeh
- Sandia Pueblo
Deb Haaland

Executive branch officials

- Pete Buttigieg, former U.S. secretary of transportation (2021–2025)
- Lynn Trujillo, senior counsel to the U.S. secretary of the interior (2023–2025)
- Tom Udall, former U.S. ambassador to New Zealand (2021–2025) and Samoa (2022–2025) and U.S. senator from New Mexico (2009–2021)

U.S. senators

- Ben Ray Luján, New Mexico (2021–present)

U.S. representatives

- Teresa Leger Fernandez, NM-3 (2021–present)
- Melanie Stansbury, NM-1 (2021–present)
- Eric Swalwell, former CA-14 (2013–2026) (rejected by candidate)
- Gabe Vasquez, NM-2 (2023–present)

State legislators

- Michelle Paulene Abeyta, state representative from the 69th district (2025–present)
- Stacey Abrams, former House minority leader (2011–2017) from Georgia's 89th district (2007–2017)
- Angel Charley, state senator from the 30th district (2025–present)
- Martin Chávez, former state senator from the 26th district (1987–1993)
- Charlotte Little, state representative from the 68th district (2023–present)
- Javier Martínez, speaker of the House (2023–present) from the 11th district (2015–present)
- Shannon Pinto, state senator from the 3rd district (2019–present)
- Reena Szczepanski, House majority leader (2025–present) from the 47th district (2023–present)

Local officials

- Martin Chávez, former mayor of Albuquerque (1993–1997, 2001–2009)
- Michael Garcia, mayor of Santa Fe (2025–present)

Tribal officials

- Jonathan Nez, former president of the Navajo Nation (2019–2023)

Individuals

- Dolores Huerta, labor leader
- Patricia Michaels, fashion designer

Labor unions

- American Federation of Teachers New Mexico
- Communications Workers of America Local 7076
- SEIU Committee of Interns and Residents

Organizations

- Conservation Voters New Mexico
- Elect Democratic Women
- EMILY's List
- End Citizens United
- Equality New Mexico
- Jane Fonda Climate PAC
- Planned Parenthood New Mexico

Tribal nations

- Jemez Pueblo
- Picuris Pueblo
- Santo Domingo Pueblo
- Zuni Pueblo

Political parties

- New Mexico Working Families Party

Newspapers

- The Santa Fe New Mexican
Declined to endorse

Statewide officials

- Michelle Lujan Grisham, incumbent governor of New Mexico (2019–present)

State legislators

- Harold Pope Jr., state senator from the 23rd district (2021–present)

==== Fundraising ====
Campaign finance reports as of April 13, 2026
Candidate	Raised	Spent	Cash on hand
Sam Bregman (D)	$3,680,756	$2,917,275	$853,429
Deb Haaland (D)	$11,079,701	$6,712,908	$4,366,793
Source: New Mexico Campaign Finance System

==== Polling ====
Poll source	Date(s) administered	Sample size (Note: Key: A – all adults RV – registered voters LV – likely voters V – unclear)	Margin of error	Sam Bregman	Deb Haaland	Other	Undecided
Research & Polling Inc. (Note: Poll conducted for the Albuquerque Journal)	April 17–24, 2026	534 (LV)	± 4.2%	30%	52%	–	18%
Emerson College (Note: Poll sponsored by KRQE News 13)	April 18–19, 2026	568 (LV)	± 4.1%	24%	40%	–	36%
Change Research (D) (Note: Poll sponsored by Bregman's campaign)	February 21–24, 2026	696 (RV)	± 4.1%	25%	46%	–	29%
GBAO (D) (Note: Poll sponsored by Haaland's campaign)	February 9–12, 2026	500 (LV)	± 4.4%	26%	56%	–	18%
Change Research (D)	January 12–18, 2026	909 (LV)	–	23%	50%	–	27%
Change Research (D)	October 8–13, 2025	1,000 (LV)	–	22%	54%	–	24%
GBAO (D)	August 6–11, 2025	355 (LV)	± 5.2%	19%	55%	9% (Note: Ken Miyagishima with 9%)	16%
Change Research (D)	March 9–13, 2025	1,014 (LV)	–	14%	63%	–	23%
Public Policy Polling (D)	December 4–5, 2024	557 (LV)	–	18%	50%	6% (Note: Laura Montoya with 6%)	27%

==== Results ====
Primary results by county: Haaland: 50–60%; 60–70%; 70–80%; 80–90%

Democratic primary results
Party	Candidate	Votes	%
Democratic	Deb Haaland	158,713	72.3
Democratic	Sam Bregman	60,619	27.7
Total votes		219,332	100.0

=== Lieutenant governor ===
==== Primary election ====
===== Candidates =====
====== Withdrew after nomination ======
- Maggie Toulouse Oliver, New Mexico secretary of state (2016–present) (withdrew on June 18)

====== Eliminated in primary ======
- Harold Pope Jr., state senator from the 23rd district (2021–present)

====== Withdrawn from primary ======
- Stephanie Garcia Richard, New Mexico commissioner of public lands (2019–present)
- Jackie Lee Onsurez, Loving village councilor

==== Endorsements ====
Harold Pope Jr.

Organizations

- Vote Common Good
- VoteVets
Maggie Toulouse Oliver (withdrawn)

Statewide officials

- Michelle Lujan Grisham, governor of New Mexico (2019–present) and former United States representative for NM-01 (2013–2019)

Organizations

- EMILYs List
Stephanie Garcia Richard

Executive branch officials

- Deb Haaland, former secretary of the interior (2021–2025)

==== Results ====
Primary results by county: Oliver: 60–70%; 70–80%; 80–90%

Democratic primary results
Party	Candidate	Votes	%
Democratic	Maggie Toulouse Oliver	169,930	80.0
Democratic	Harold Pope Jr.	42,515	20.0
Total votes		212,445	100.0

==== Replacement selection ====
After winning the June 2 primary, Toulouse Oliver withdrew from the race on June 18, citing health issues. Haaland announced she would be interviewing candidates to replace Toulouse Oliver on the ballot. However, the final decision on Toulouse Oliver's replacement rested with the state Democratic Party's Central Committee. The candidates listed below are the five Haaland chose to interview, though the State Central Committee could have chosen any candidate and was not limited to the following five. Haaland endorsed Garcia Richard on June 26, and the State Central Committee formally chose her on July 30.

===== Replacement nominee =====
- Stephanie Garcia Richard, New Mexico commissioner of public lands (2019–present)

===== Eliminated in replacement vote =====
- Leo Jaramillo, state senator from the 5th district (2021–present)
- Harold Pope Jr., state senator from the 23rd district (2021–present) and runner-up in the original primary election
- Antonia Roybal-Mack, attorney
- Sonia Smith, former New Mexico secretary of veterans services

== Republican primary ==
=== Governor ===
==== Candidates ====
===== Nominee =====
- Gregg Hull, mayor of Rio Rancho (2014–2026)

===== Eliminated in primary =====
- Duke Rodriguez, former secretary of the New Mexico Human Services Department
- Doug Turner, businessman and candidate for governor in 2010

===== Withdrawn =====
- Jim Ellison, former New Mexico public regulation commissioner (2023–2024) (ran for state treasurer)

===== Disqualified =====
- Steve Lanier, state senator from the 2nd district (2025–present)
- Belinda Robertson, fitness instructor

===== Declined =====
- John Block, state representative from the 51st district (2023–present)
- Crystal Brantley, state senator from the 35th district (2021–present)
- Nella Domenici, former CFO of Bridgewater Associates, daughter of former U.S. Senator Pete Domenici, and nominee for U.S. Senate in 2024
- Mark Murphy, state representative from the 59th district (2025–present)
- Judith Nakamura, former chief justice of the New Mexico Supreme Court (2017–2020)

==== Endorsements ====
Gregg Hull

Organizations

- New Mexico State University College Republicans

Newspapers

- The Santa Fe New Mexican
Duke Rodriguez

Statewide officials

- Gary Johnson, former governor of New Mexico (1995–2003) (Libertarian) (Note: Johnson was elected as a Republican)
Doug Turner

U.S. representatives

- Yvette Herrell, former NM-02 (2021–2023)

Statewide officials

- John Sanchez, former lieutenant governor of New Mexico (2011–2019)

==== Fundraising ====
Campaign finance reports as of April 13, 2026
Candidate	Raised	Spent	Cash on hand
Gregg Hull (R)	$474,113	$235,979	$238,133
Duke Rodriguez (R)	$501,249	$326,436	$174,813
Doug Turner (R)	$502,798	$63,206	$439,592
Source: New Mexico Campaign Finance System

==== Polling ====
Poll source	Date(s) administered	Sample size	Margin of error	Gregg Hull	Duke Rodriguez	Doug Turner	Other	Undecided
Public Opinion Strategies (R)	May 18–20, 2026	400 (LV)	± 4.9%	33%	12%	30%	–	25%
Research & Polling Inc.	April 24 – May 1, 2026	477 (LV)	± 4.3%	30%	9%	21%	–	40%
Emerson College	April 18–19, 2026	432 (LV)	± 4.7%	21%	10%	9%	–	61%

==== Results ====
Primary results by county: Hull: 30–40%; 40–50%; 50–60%; 70–80%; Turner: 30–40%; 40–50%; 50–60%; 60–70%

Republican primary results
Party	Candidate	Votes	%
Republican	Gregg Hull	56,708	47.0
Republican	Doug Turner	44,480	36.9
Republican	Duke Rodriguez	19,393	16.1
Total votes		120,581	100.0

=== Lieutenant governor ===
==== Candidates ====
===== Nominee =====
- David Gallegos, state senator from the 41st district (2021–present)

===== Eliminated in primary =====
- Aubrey Blair Dunn, lawyer, son of former public lands commissioner Aubrey Dunn Jr., and Libertarian nominee for attorney general in 2018
- Manuel Lardizabal, business owner and nominee for SD-26 in 2020

==== Results ====
Primary results by county: Gallegos: 40–50%; 50–60%; 60–70%; 80–90%; Dunn: 40–50%; 50–60%

Republican primary results
Party	Candidate	Votes	%
Republican	David Gallegos	56,640	49.7
Republican	Aubrey Blair Dunn	42,954	37.8
Republican	Manuel Lardizabal	14,183	12.5
Total votes		113,777	100.0

== Independent candidates ==
=== Governor ===
==== Candidates ====
===== Withdrawn =====
- Ken Miyagishima, former mayor of Las Cruces (2007–2023) (previously ran as a Democrat; endorsed Hull)

== General election ==
=== Predictions ===
Source	Ranking	As of
The Cook Political Report	Solid D	October 29, 2026
Decision Desk HQ	Likely D	November 3, 2026
Fox News	Solid D	November 1, 2026
Inside Elections	Likely D	October 29, 2026
NBC News	Solid D	November 3, 2026
RealClearPolitics	Lean D	November 1, 2026
Sabato's Crystal Ball	Safe D	November 2, 2026
Silver Bulletin	Solid D	November 3, 2026

=== Post-primary endorsements ===
Deb Haaland (D)

Executive branch officials

- Barack Obama, former president of the United States (2009–2017)

U.S. senators

- Martin Heinrich, New Mexico (2013–present)

Statewide officials

- Gretchen Whitmer, governor of Michigan (2019–present)

Individuals

- Danny Romero, boxer
- George R. R. Martin, writer

Labor unions

- American Federation of State, County and Municipal Employees Council 18
- National Education Association-New Mexico
- New Mexico AFL-CIO
- New Mexico Professional Fire Fighters Association
- New Mexico State Council of Machinists and Aerospace Workers
- Sheet Metal Workers Local 49
- Western States Regional Council of Carpenters

Organizations

- Democrats for Education Reform
- Giffords
- Human Rights Campaign
- National Women's Political Caucus

Tribal nations

- Ohkay Owingeh Pueblo
- Sandia Pueblo
Gregg Hull (R)

Statewide officials

- Gary Johnson, former governor of New Mexico (1995–2003) (Libertarian; elected as a Republican)

Local officials

- Ken Miyagishima, former mayor of Las Cruces (2007–2023) and former gubernatorial candidate (Independent)

Organizations

- NRA Political Victory Fund
Ken Miyagishima (I) (withdrawn)

Political parties

- New Mexico Forward Party

=== Polling ===
Aggregate polls

Source of poll aggregation	Dates administered	Dates updated	Deb Haaland (D)	Gregg Hull (R)	Other/Undecided (Note: Calculated by taking the difference of 100% and all other candidates combined.)	Margin
Silver Bulletin	through October 9, 2026	October 11, 2026	48.0%	40.1%	11.9%	Haaland +7.9%

Poll source	Date(s) administered	Sample size	Margin of error	Deb Haaland (D)	Gregg Hull (R)	Other	Undecided
Research Co.	October 31 – November 2, 2026	450 (LV)	± 4.6%	51%	44%	—	5%
Research & Polling Inc.	October 1–9, 2026	1,125 (LV)	± 2.9%	49%	42%	—	9%
SurveyUSA (Note: Poll commissioned by KOB)	September 25–30, 2026	567 (LV)	± 5.1%	47%	41%	—	12%
Research & Polling Inc.	August 21–28, 2026	516 (LV)	± 4.3%	49%	43%	—	8%
BSP Research (D)	July 22 – August 7, 2026	800 (RV)	± 3.5%	41%	24%	7% (Note: "Another candidate" with 3%, "Refused" with 4%)	27%
McLaughlin & Associates (R) (Note: Poll sponsored by Hull's campaign)	July 13–15, 2026	400 (LV)	± 4.9%	46%	45%	—	9%

=== Results ===
2026 New Mexico gubernatorial election
Party	Candidate	Votes	%	±%
Democratic	Deb Haaland; Stephanie Garcia Richard			
Republican	Gregg Hull; David Gallegos			
Total votes			100.0	
Democratic hold				

== See also ==
- 2026 New Mexico elections

== Notes ==
Partisan clients
