= 2026 New Mexico elections =

- November 3, 2026

The 2026 New Mexico elections were held in the state of New Mexico on November 3, 2026, alongside the nationwide midterm elections. Elections was held for a U.S. Senate seat and governor as well as other statewide executive offices, all 3 of the state's U.S. House of Representatives seats, all seats in the New Mexico House of Representatives, and other judicial and local elections. Primary elections were held on June 2, 2026.

New Mexico is generally considered to be a Democratic state, but competitive elections are common. New Mexico has not voted for a Republican for President since 2004, when George W. Bush narrowly won the state. Republicans have not won a U.S. Senate seat in New Mexico since 2002. Democrats have had full control of the state's U.S. House of Representatives delegation since 2022. Democrats have held the governorship and all other statewide executive offices since 2019. Kamala Harris defeated Donald Trump by 6% in New Mexico in 2024.

== Background ==
The primary election marks the first time in New Mexico that decline to state voters are allowed to vote either for Democratic or Republican candidates during a primary.

== Federal ==
=== United States Senate ===
Incumbent Democratic U.S. senator Ben Ray Luján was first elected in 2020 with 51.7% of the vote. He is running for re-election to a second term in office.

=== United States House of Representatives ===
All three of New Mexico's seats in the United States House of Representatives are up for election in 2026. Following the 2024 elections, Democrats control all three of New Mexico's seats in Congress.

== Executive ==
=== Governor ===
Incumbent Democratic governor Michelle Lujan Grisham is term-limited and ineligible to seek a third consecutive term per the New Mexico Constitution.

Former United States Secretary of the Interior and former U.S. representative Deb Haaland won the Democratic nomination, defeating Bernalillo County District Attorney Sam Bregman. Rio Rancho mayor Gregg Hull defeated state senator Steve Lanie to win the Republican nomination.

Former Las Cruces mayor Ken Miyagishima entered the race as a Democrat, but became an independent candidate in February 2026 before he announced the suspension of his campaign and endorsed Hull.

=== Attorney General ===
Incumbent Democratic attorney general Raúl Torrez was first elected in 2022 with 55.3% of the vote. He is running for re-election to a second term in office.

=== Secretary of State ===
Incumbent Democratic secretary of state Maggie Toulouse Oliver is term-limited and ineligible to seek re-election to a second consecutive term. She is instead running for lieutenant governor.

Santa Fe County Clerk Katharine Clark, Doña Ana County Clerk Amanda López Askin, and former cabinet secretary Sonya Smith are running for the Democratic nomination.

=== Commissioner of Public Lands ===
Incumbent Democratic commissioner Stephanie Garcia Richard is term-limited and ineligible to seek re-election to a third consecutive term. Although she announced a run for lieutenant governor, she suspended her campaign in October 2025 due to family health issues.

State representative Matthew McQueen, former New Mexico Farm Service Agency director Jonas Moya, and U.S. Army Corps of Engineers specialist Juan Sanchez are running for the Democratic nomination. Chaves County Commission vice chairman Michael Perry is running for the Republican nomination.

=== Treasurer ===
Incumbent Democratic treasurer Laura Montoya was first elected in 2022 with 53.2% of the vote. She is running for re-election.

=== Auditor ===
Incumbent Democratic auditor Joseph Maestas was first elected in 2022 with 61.9% of the vote. He is running for re-election to a second term in office.

== State House of Representatives ==
All 70 seats in the New Mexico House of Representatives are up for election in 2026. State representatives in New Mexico serve two year terms.

Following the 2024 elections, Democrats hold 44 seats, and Republicans hold 26.

== Judicial elections ==
Two seats on the New Mexico Supreme Court, currently held by Shannon Bacon and David Thomson, are scheduled to have retention elections in 2026.

Two seats on the New Mexico Court of Appeals, currently held by J. Miles Hanisee and Kristopher Houghton, are also scheduled to have retention elections in 2026.

== Public Education Commission ==
Five of ten seats on the New Mexico Public Education Commission will be up for election.
