= Trujillo (surname) =

Trujillo is a Spanish surname that originates from the Spanish town of Trujillo in modern day Extremadura, Spain. The town of Trujillo was home to many conquistadors which is why it became widespread in the Americas.

Notable people with the surname include:

- Alejandro Trujillo (1952–2020), Chilean footballer
- Alex Trujillo (born 1974), Puerto Rican boxer
- Alfonso López Trujillo (1935–2008), Colombian cardinal
- Bernardo Trujillo (1920–1971), Colombian-born American marketing executive
- César Gaviria Trujillo (born 1947), Colombian president
- Chad Trujillo (born 1973), American astronomer
- Consuelo Trujillo, Spanish actress
- David Trujillo (born c. 1976), American businessman
- Desideri Trujillo (born 2006) American-Mexican film director, actor, writer, editor, animator and music supervisor
- Diego Trujillo (born 1960), Colombian actor
- Emmanuel Trujillo (1930–2010), American anti-Nazi spy and peyotist of Chiricahua Apache descent
- Héctor Trujillo (1908–2002), Dominican Republic president
- Larry Trujillo (1940-2022), American politician
- Luis Trujillo (born 1977), Peruvian footballer
- Lynn Trujillo, American lawyer and government official
- Maddux Trujillo (born 2003), American football player
- Marcela Trujillo, Chilean visual artist, painter, cartoonist, professor
- María Trujillo (born 1959), Mexican–American athlete
- Mariano Trujillo (born 1977), Mexican footballer
- Rafael Trujillo (1891–1961), Dominican Republic dictator
- Rafael Trujillo (sailor) (born 1975), Spanish sailor
- Raoul Trujillo (born 1955), American actor
- Rigoberto Trujillo (born 1978), Cuban judoka
- Robert Trujillo (born 1964), American musician, member of Metallica
- Rosamar Trujillo Plumey (born 1968), Puerto Rican social worker and politician
- Solomon Trujillo (born 1951), American business executive
- Stephen Trujillo, American soldier
- Tony Trujillo (born 1982), American skateboarder
- Valentín Trujillo (writer) (born 1979), Uruguayan writer
- Valentín Trujillo (actor) (1951–2006), Mexican actor
- Valentín Trujillo (pianist) (born 1933), Chilean pianist
