= 2026 New Mexico State Treasurer election =

- November 3, 2026
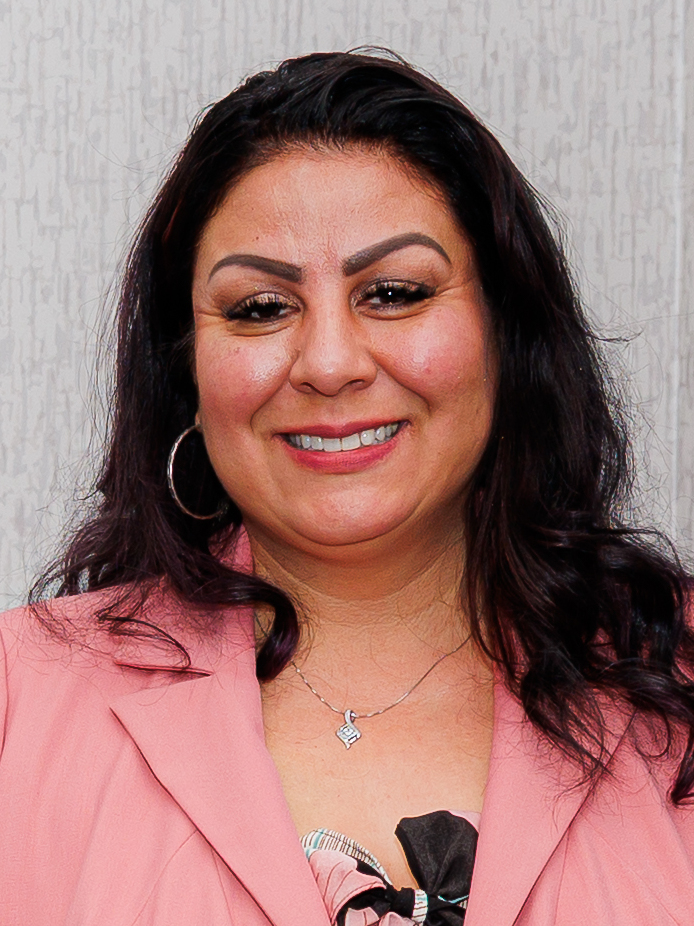

Nominee	Laura Montoya	Jim Ellison
Party	Democratic	Republican
Popular vote	426,792	286,964
Percentage	59.8%	40.2%
State Treasurer before election
Laura Montoya
Democratic
Elected State Treasurer
Laura Montoya
Democratic

The 2026 New Mexico State Treasurer election was held on November 3, 2026, to elect the New Mexico State Treasurer. Incumbent Democratic State Treasurer Laura Montoya was re-elected to a second term in office; defeating Republican challenger Jim Ellison. Primary elections were held on June 2, 2026. Both the Democratic and Republican primaries were uncontested.

== Democratic primary ==
=== Candidates ===
==== Nominee ====
- Laura Montoya, incumbent state treasurer

=== Results ===
Democratic primary results
Party	Candidate	Votes	%
Democratic	Laura Montoya (incumbent)	181,212	100.0
Total votes		181,212	100.0

== Republican primary ==
=== Candidates ===
- Jim Ellison, former New Mexico Public Regulation Commissioner (2023–2024) (write-in)

=== Results ===
Republican primary results
Party	Candidate	Votes	%
Republican	Jim Ellison (write-in)	29,614	100.0
Total votes		29,614	100.0

== General election ==
=== Results ===
2026 New Mexico State Treasurer election
Party	Candidate	Votes	%	±%
Democratic	Laura Montoya (incumbent)			
Republican	James F. Ellison			
Total votes			100.0	

== See also ==
- 2026 United States state treasurer elections
- 2026 New Mexico elections
