= New Mexico Land Grant Permanent Fund =

Sovereign wealth fund in New Mexico

- Type: Sovereign wealth fund
- Industry: Institutional investor
- Founded: 1912
- Founder: Government of New Mexico
- Key people: Michelle Lujan Grisham (Chairperson); Stephanie Garcia Richard (Vice Chair); Laura Montoya (Treasurer)
- AUM: $28.65 billion
- Owner: New Mexico
- Website: https://www.sic.state.nm.us/

The New Mexico Land Grant Permanent Fund (LGPF) is a permanent fund that provides revenues to New Mexico's public schools and universities, among other special beneficiaries. Its assets include mineral rights throughout the state. It is one of the largest permanent funds in the United States, managing more than $28.65 billion in total assets. It is the largest of New Mexico's four permanent funds.

== Management ==
The fund is managed by New Mexico's State Investment Council, an independent state agency which functions as a sovereign wealth fund. The council is made up of certain members of the Government of New Mexico, who serve on an ex-officio basis, and public members appointed alternately by the Governor of New Mexico and New Mexico Legislature. Public members serve for five years and must be confirmed by the New Mexico Senate. Members may be re-appointed if the governor or legislature decide to do so,

Members of the New Mexico State Investment Council as of April 11, 2024
Name	Position	Term
Michelle Lujan Grisham	Chair; Governor of New Mexico	Ex Officio
Stephanie Garcia Richard	Vice Chair; New Mexico State Land Commissioner	Ex Officio
Laura Montoya	Treasurer of New Mexico	Ex Officio
Wayne Propst	Secretary for the New Mexico Department of Finance and Administration	Ex Officio
Nicholas Telles	Vice President of Finance, Santa Fe Community College	Ex Officio (Note: The council is required to have among its members the CFO of a state institution of higher education.)
Catherine Allen	Public Member; Legislative Appointee	2021–2025
John Bingaman	Public Member; Governor Appointee	2021–2026
Dr. Kelly O'Donnell	Public Member; Legislative Appointee	2023–2028
L. Michael Messina	Public Member; Governor Appointee	2019–2024
Allen Sánchez	Public Member; Legislative Appointee	2023–2028
Kurt A. Sommer	Public Member; Legislative Appointee	2022–2027

== History ==
In 1893, the government of the United States passed the Ferguson Act, giving the New Mexico Territory lands meant to support New Mexico's schools and universities. While New Mexico had not yet joined the union, the Ferguson Act and the Enabling Act of 1910 were passed in anticipation of New Mexico's scheduled accession in 1912.

== Reform ==
Invest in Kids Now has called for the state to increase the fund's distribution to 7% to fund early-childhood education programs, particularly focusing on literacy; New Mexico ranks 50th in reading proficiency in the United States. In 2022, voters approved a constitutional amendment requiring a 1.25% distribution from the fund to provide early childhood education. The amendment passed by more than 70%.
