= Mayfield High School (New Mexico) =

Location
- 1955 North Valley Dr. Las Cruces, New Mexico 88007; United States; 32°19′30″N 106°48′15″W

Information
- School type: Public, high school
- Founded: 1965
- School district: Las Cruces Public Schools
- Principal: Eric Fraass
- Staff: 83.59 (FTE)
- Grades: 9–12
- Enrollment: 1421 (2023–24)
- Student to teacher ratio: 17.24
- Campus: Suburban
- Colors: Green, Gold
- Athletics conference: NMAA, 5A Dist. 3
- Nickname: Trojans
- Website: https://mhs.lcps.net/

Mayfield High School (MHS) is one of four traditional public high schools in Las Cruces, New Mexico. As of 2023–24, the school serves 1,421 students. The school is a part of the Las Cruces Public Schools district.

== History ==
MHS was opened in 1965 after Las Cruces High School became overcrowded. It became the second high school in Las Cruces. The school was named after former Las Cruces Public Schools superintendent, Thomas J. Mayfield.

In 1967, the school colors were chosen as green and gold, the Green Bay Packers' colors, who were the National Football League champions in that year. The mascot Trojan was chosen the same year, largely because the University of Southern California Trojans won the NCAA football Championship.

== Demographics ==
As of June 2024

Ethnicity	This School
Hispanic (of any race)	80.6%
White	16.6%
African American	1.5%
Multiracial	<1%
Native American	<1%
Pacific Islander	<1%

== Rivalry ==
Historically MHS has been the rival of Las Cruces High School. The rivalry has existed in since the founding of MHS, with a legacy spanning several decades of heated matches and competition for the best team in the city. There is often enough fan turnout to be played at Aggie Memorial Stadium. The Mayfield-Las Cruces high school football rivalry was voted the 9th best in the nation by rivals.com in 2008, and was ranked the 2nd biggest rivalry by USA today in 2013. The movie "Cruces Divided" was filmed based on this rivalry.

== Athletics ==
MHS competes in the New Mexico Activities Association (NMAA), as a class 5A school in District 4. In addition to Mayfield High School, the schools in District 4-5A include: Artesia High School, Goddard High School, and Roswell High School. MHS has a long history of athletic successes, including winning the state championship in football in 1971, 1995, 1996, 1998, 2005, 2006, 2007, and 2010.

== Notable alumni ==
- Edgar Castillo – professional soccer player
- Doug Eddings – Major League Baseball umpire
- Eric Enriquez – Mayor of Las Cruces
- Robert G. Frank - president of University of New Mexico
- George Hennard – perpetrator of the Luby's shooting
- Darius Holland – National Football League player
- Xochitl Torres Small – United States Deputy Secretary of Agriculture
- Austin Trout – professional boxer
