= Rio Rancho City Council =

Legislative authority of Rio Rancho, New Mexico

The Rio Rancho City Council

Type
- Type: City Council

Leadership
- Mayor of Rio Rancho: Paul Wymer, (R) since May 1st 2026
- Deputy Mayor: Karissa Culbreath, (D) since May 1st 2026

Structure
- Seats: 6 voting members
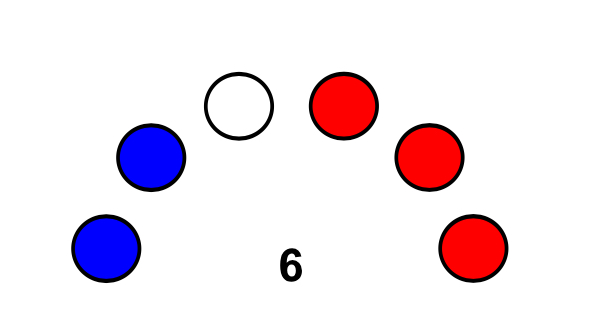
- Political groups: Majority: Republican (3); Minority: Democrat (2); Vacant: Vacant (1)

Website
- Rio Rancho City Government – City Council

The Rio Rancho City Council is the elected legislative authority of the city of Rio Rancho, New Mexico. It consists of 6 members, elected from respective districts of the city on a non-partisan basis. The form of city government is council–manager government and home rule municipality. It meets in the New Council chambers at the Rio Rancho city hall in the northwest quadrant of the city.

== Composition ==
=== Current members ===
Name	Position	Party reg.	Took office	Up for re–election
Paul Wymer	Mayor	Republican	2026	2030
Deborah Dapson	District 1	Democrat	2024	2028
Jeremy Lenintine	District 2	Republican	2019	2030
Bob Tyler	District 3	Republican	2018	2030
Vacant	District 4	N/A	N/A	2028
Karissa Culbreath	District 5	Democrat	2020	2030
Nicole List	District 6	Republican	2023	2028

== See also ==
- List of mayors of Rio Rancho, New Mexico
