= 2022 New Mexico State Treasurer election =

- November 8, 2022
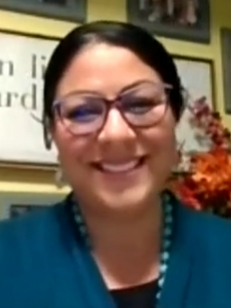

Nominee	Laura Montoya	Harry Montoya
Party	Democratic	Republican
Popular vote	370,089	326,224
Percentage	53.15%	46.85%
- L. Montoya: 50–60% 60–70% 70–80% 80–90% >90% H. Montoya: 50–60% 60–70% 70–80% 80–90% >90% Tie: 50% No votes
State Treasurer before election
Tim Eichenberg
Democratic
Elected State Treasurer
Laura Montoya
Democratic

The 2022 New Mexico State Treasurer election took place on November 8, 2022, to elect the next New Mexico State Treasurer. Incumbent Democratic Party Treasurer Tim Eichenberg was term-limited and could not seek re-election.

== Democratic primary ==
=== Candidates ===
==== Nominee ====
- Laura Montoya, former Sandoval County treasurer

==== Eliminated in primary ====
- Heather Benavidez, former magistrate judge

=== Endorsements ===
Heather Benavidez

State officials

- Tim Eichenberg, New Mexico State Treasurer
Laura Montoya

Newspapers

- Albuquerque Journal

=== Results ===
Results by county Montoya: 50–60%; 60–70%; 70–80%; Benavidez: 50–60%

Democratic primary results
Party	Candidate	Votes	%
Democratic	Laura Montoya	75,538	58.70%
Democratic	Heather Benavidez	53,148	41.30%
Total votes		128,686	100.0%

== Republican primary ==
=== Candidates ===
==== Nominee ====
- Harry Montoya, Santa Fe county commissioner

=== Results ===
Republican primary results
Party	Candidate	Votes	%
Republican	Harry Montoya	91,766	100.0%
Total votes		91,766	100.0%

== General election ==
=== Polling ===
Poll source	Date(s) administered	Sample size (Note: Key: A – all adults RV – registered voters LV – likely voters V – unclear)	Margin of error	Laura Montoya (D)	Harry Montoya (R)	Other	Undecided
Research & Polling Inc.	October 20–27, 2022	625 (LV)	± 3.9%	46%	39%	2% (Note: "None of these/Wouldn't say" with 2%)	13%
Research & Polling Inc.	August 19–25, 2022	518 (LV)	± 4.3%	44%	33%	4% (Note: "None of these/Wouldn't say" with 4%)	19%

=== Results ===
2022 New Mexico State Treasurer election
Party	Candidate	Votes	%	±%
Democratic	Laura Montoya	370,089	53.15%	−4.77%
Republican	Harry Montoya	326,224	46.85%	+4.77%
Total votes		696,313	100.00%	N/A
Democratic hold				

==== By county ====
County	Laura Montoya Democratic		Harry Montoya Republican		Margin		Total votes cast
County	#	%	#	%	#	%	Total votes cast
Bernalillo	139,623	58.55%	98,857	41.45%	40,766	17.09%	238,480
Catron	474	24.12%	1,491	75.88%	-1,017	-51.76%	1,965
Chaves	4,303	26.76%	11,776	73.24%	-7,473	-46.48%	16,079
Cibola	3,606	54.14%	3,055	45.86%	551	8.27%	6,661
Colfax	2,141	44.59%	2,661	55.41%	-520	-10.83%	4,802
Curry	2,613	25.89%	7,480	74.11%	-4,867	-48.22%	10,093
De Baca	178	24.83%	539	75.17%	-361	-50.35%	717
Doña Ana	31,563	55.42%	25,394	44.58%	6,169	10.83%	56,957
Eddy	3,822	23.25%	12,618	76.75%	-8,796	-53.50%	16,440
Grant	6,249	54.57%	5,202	45.43%	1,047	9.14%	11,451
Guadalupe	993	59.68%	671	40.32%	322	19.35%	1,664
Harding	129	32.25%	271	67.75%	-142	-35.50%	400
Hidalgo	639	42.32%	871	57.68%	-232	-15.36%	1,510
Lea	2,386	17.26%	11,440	82.74%	-9,054	-65.49%	13,826
Lincoln	2,401	29.22%	5,816	70.78%	-3,415	-41.56%	8,217
Los Alamos	6,008	60.94%	3,851	39.06%	2,157	21.88%	9,859
Luna	2,565	44.73%	3,169	55.27%	-604	-10.53%	5,734
McKinley	12,794	68.37%	5,919	31.63%	6,875	36.74%	18,713
Mora	1,601	68.68%	730	31.32%	871	37.37%	2,331
Otero	5,979	34.49%	11,357	65.51%	-5,378	-31.02%	17,336
Quay	875	29.60%	2,081	70.40%	-1,206	-40.80%	2,956
Rio Arriba	7,776	62.09%	4,747	37.91%	3,029	24.19%	12,523
Roosevelt	1,143	24.91%	3,446	75.09%	-2,303	-50.19%	4,589
San Juan	13,699	34.87%	25,584	65.13%	-11,885	-30.25%	39,283
San Miguel	6,547	70.81%	2,699	29.19%	3,848	41.62%	9,246
Sandoval	31,256	51.98%	28,875	48.02%	2,381	3.96%	60,131
Santa Fe	50,913	74.24%	17,665	25.76%	33,248	48.48%	68,578
Sierra	1,865	38.68%	2,956	61.32%	-1,091	-22.63%	4,821
Socorro	3,101	52.30%	2,828	47.70%	273	4.60%	5,929
Taos	10,082	76.73%	3,058	23.27%	7,024	53.46%	13,140
Torrance	1,753	32.33%	3,669	67.67%	-1,916	-35.34%	5,422
Union	366	25.21%	1,086	74.79%	-720	-49.59%	1,452
Valencia	10,646	42.57%	14,362	57.43%	-3,716	-14.86%	25,008
Totals	370,089	53.15%	326,224	46.85%	43,865	6.30%	696,313

Counties that flipped from Democratic to Republican

- Hidalgo (largest municipality: Lordsburg)

==== By congressional district ====
Laura Montoya won two of three congressional districts with Harry Montoya winning the remaining one, which elected a Democrat.

District	Laura Montoya	Harry Montoya	Representative
1st	54%	46%	Melanie Stansbury
2nd	49.9%	50.1%	Yvette Herrell (117th Congress)
2nd	49.9%	50.1%	Gabe Vasquez (118th Congress)
3rd	55%	45%	Teresa Leger Fernandez
