= Ken Miyagishima =

American politician (born 1963)

Mayor of Las Cruces
- In office November 19, 2007 – December 18, 2023
- Preceded by: Bill Mattiace
- Succeeded by: Eric Enriquez

Personal details
- Born: Kenneth Daniel Gallegos Miyagishima; May 15, 1963 (age 63) Biloxi, Mississippi, U.S.
- Party: Independent (2026–present)
- Other political affiliations: Democratic (before 2026)
- Spouse: Rosie
- Children: 4
- Education: New Mexico State University (BS)

Kenneth Daniel Gallegos Miyagishima (born May 15, 1963) is an American businessman and politician who served as the mayor of Las Cruces, New Mexico from 2007 to 2023. Miyagishima was the first New Mexican of Japanese descent to be elected to public office and the longest-serving mayor of the city.

He was among three Democratic Party candidates who has declared his intent to run for governor of New Mexico in 2026, but chose to become an independent in February of that year, before ultimately withdrawing and endorsing the Republican nominee.

== Early life and education ==
Miyagishima was born in Biloxi, Mississippi. His father is of Mexican descent and his mother of Japanese descent, and he has said both cultures are important to him. He has lived in Las Cruces, New Mexico since his family moved there in 1971, when he was a child. Both his father and older brother served in the military during the Vietnam War.

Miyagishima attended public schools throughout childhood. In 1985 he graduated from New Mexico State University with degrees in finance and real estate.

== Career ==
Miyagishima ran for a position in the New Mexico House of Representatives in 1990 against Republican Lee Rawson. He received 48% of the vote.

In 1992, he was elected to the office of Doña Ana County Commissioner, position 4, becoming New Mexico's first American of Japanese descent to be elected to public office. From 1998 through 2000, he was voted "Best County Commissioner" in a local newspaper readers' poll. In 2002, he received the Commander's Award for Public Service from the United States Department of the Army.

Miyagishima was elected to the non-partisan city council of Las Cruces. He won re-election to the city council in 2005.

Miyagishima was elected as the mayor of Las Cruces in 2007 and was reelected in 2011, 2015, and 2019. He is the second person in Doña Ana County to have been elected both chairman of the Doña Ana County Commission and mayor of Las Cruces.

In August 2013, Miyagishima unsuccessfully applied to become Doña Ana County Manager.

In office, Miyagishima was known as a pro-business Democrat, occasionally clashing with a more progressive city council. In the 2020 Democratic Party presidential primaries, Miyagishima was one of several mayors to pledge support for former New York City mayor Michael Bloomberg. After Bloomberg dropped out of the race, Miyagishima endorsed Joe Biden.

He was opposed to cannabis legalization and bail reform during his time as mayor. He did support a humanitarian response to migrants settling in the city.

Miyagishima announced in 2022 that he would not seek a fifth term as mayor. He was succeeded by fellow Democrat Eric Enriquez.

During his tenure as mayor, Miyagishima oversaw the building of city hall, the convention center, and an Aquatic Center. The city prioritized downtown revitalization. In reflecting on his term of office, he stated he was most proud of raising graduation rates.

Since resigning as mayor, Miyagishima has returned to work as a district manager for Farmers Insurance. In 2025 he declared his candidacy for governor of New Mexico, to prepare for the 2026 primary and election.

In February 2026, Miyagishima left the Democratic Party to become an independent. He announced he would continue his campaign for Governor as an independent and work with the Forward Party to become their nominee.

Later in July that year, he announced he was withdrawing from the race and endorsing Republican nominee Gregg Hull for the general election.

== Personal life ==
Ken married Rosario Rodriguez. They have four grown children together: Danielle, John, Frank, and Carlos.
