= David W. King =

American politician

25th Treasurer of New Mexico
- In office January 1, 1991 – January 1, 1995
- Governor: Bruce King
- Preceded by: James B. Lewis
- Succeeded by: Michael A. Montoya

Member of the New Mexico Public Regulation Commission from the 2nd district
- In office January 1, 2003 – January 1, 2011
- Preceded by: Rory McMinn
- Succeeded by: Patrick H. Lyons

Personal details
- Born: June 28, 1946 (age 79)
- Party: Republican (since 1995)
- Other political affiliations: Democratic (until 1995)
- Relations: Bruce King (uncle); Gary King (cousin)
- Education: New Mexico State University (BA, MA)

David W. King (born June 28, 1946) is an American politician from New Mexico. Beginning his career as a member of the Democratic Party, he changed affiliation to the Republican Party in 1995. He is the nephew of Bruce King, a three-time Governor of New Mexico.

== Career ==
In 1980, incumbent Democratic Congressman Harold L. Runnels of New Mexico's 2nd district died of cancer, three months before the general election. The state Democratic committee chose King to replace him on the ballot over Dorothy Runnels, the late Congressman's widow. King, however, had only moved his voter registration into the district ten days after Runnels' death. In protest, Dorothy Runnels waged a write-in campaign, as did Republican Joe Skeen, who was denied ballot access after taking his case to the state Supreme Court. On election day, Skeen won with 38% of the vote, with King and Runnels finishing with 34% and 28%, respectively.

King served in the administrations of New Mexico Governors Bruce King and Toney Anaya in various positions, including director of state planning (1971–1975), secretary of finance and administration (1979–1981), and secretary of general services (1983–1986). In addition, on the federal level, he was state director for the Farmers Home Administration from 1977 to 1978. In 1986, he was appointed deputy state treasurer under Treasurer James B. Lewis before he was elected to succeed Lewis in 1990. He ran for re-election in 1994, but lost to Michael A. Montoya in the Democratic primary.

In the private sector, King co-founded a real estate brokerage and was chief financial officer of New Mexico State University Alamogordo. He was village administrator of Angel Fire, New Mexico before he was ousted by Mayor Barbara Cottam, who claimed he failed to meet the demands of the job. He was a board member of South Central Colfax County Special Hospital District and the New Mexico Osteopathic Foundation.

In 2002, King ran for a seat on the New Mexico Public Regulation Commission, defeating incumbent Rory McMinn in the Republican primary, and winning the general election unopposed. He was re-elected in 2006 over his Democratic opponent and was chosen to be vice chairman of the Commission in 2009. King was succeeded by Patrick H. Lyons.

=== Sexual harassment lawsuits ===
In 2007, a jury awarded a former PRC employee $841,842 in damages in response to a suit accusing King of sexual harassment and other PRC officials of retaliating against her for complaining about King's behavior. The state also settled claims from three women who filed sexual harassment suits when he was state treasurer, totaling $305,000.

== Personal life ==
King is a resident of Stanley, New Mexico.

Political offices
| Preceded by James B. Lewis | Treasurer of New Mexico; 1991–1995 | Succeeded by Michael A. Montoya |
