= 2022 New Mexico Commissioner of Public Lands election =

- November 8, 2022
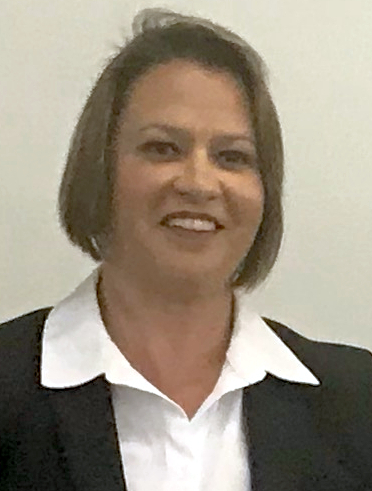

Nominee	Stephanie Garcia Richard	Jefferson Byrd
Party	Democratic	Republican
Popular vote	379,621	310,853
Percentage	54.67%	44.76%
- Richard: 40–50% 50–60% 60–70% 70–80% 80–90% >90% Byrd: 50–60% 60–70% 70–80% 80–90% >90% Marker: 60–70% Tie: 50% No votes
Commissioner of Public Lands before election
Stephanie Garcia Richard
Democratic
Elected Commissioner of Public Lands
Stephanie Garcia Richard
Democratic

The 2022 New Mexico Commissioner of Public Lands election took place on November 8, 2022, to elect the next New Mexico Commissioner of Public Lands. Incumbent Democratic Land Commissioner Stephanie Garcia Richard won re-election.

== Democratic primary ==
=== Candidates ===
==== Nominee ====
- Stephanie Garcia Richard, incumbent land commissioner

=== Results ===
Democratic primary results
Party	Candidate	Votes	%
Democratic	Stephanie Garcia Richard (incumbent)	116,641	100.0%
Total votes		116,641	100.0%

== Republican primary ==
=== Candidates ===
==== Nominee ====
- Jefferson Byrd, member of the New Mexico Public Regulation Commission (2019–present) and environmental engineer

=== Results ===
Republican primary results
Party	Candidate	Votes	%
Republican	Jefferson Byrd	92,318	100.0%
Total votes		92,318	100.0%

== Independents ==
=== Candidates ===
==== Declared ====
- Larry Marker (write-in), former oil and gas operator

== General election ==
=== Polling ===
Poll source	Date(s) administered	Sample size (Note: Key: A – all adults RV – registered voters LV – likely voters V – unclear)	Margin of error	Stephanie Garcia Richard (D)	Jefferson Boyd (R)	Other	Undecided
Research & Polling Inc.	October 20–27, 2022	625 (LV)	± 3.9%	46%	38%	1% (Note: "None of these/Wouldn't say" with 1%)	15%
Research & Polling Inc.	August 19–25, 2022	518 (LV)	± 4.3%	46%	35%	3% (Note: "None of these/Wouldn't say" with 3%)	17%

=== Results ===
2022 New Mexico Commissioner of Public Lands election
Party	Candidate	Votes	%	±%
Democratic	Stephanie Garcia Richard (incumbent)	379,621	54.67%	+3.57%
Republican	Jefferson Byrd	310,853	44.76%	+1.63%
Independent	Larry E. Marker (write-in)	3,950	0.57%	N/A
Total votes		694,424	100.00%	
Democratic hold				

==== By county ====
County	Stephanie Garcia Richard Democratic		Jefferson Byrd Republican		Larry E. Marker Independent (write-in)		Margin		Total
County	#	%	#	%	#	%	#	%	Total
Bernalillo	143,731	60.30%	94,085	39.47%	529	0.22%	49,646	20.83%	238,345
Catron	480	24.40%	1,482	75.34%	5	0.25%	-1,002	-50.94%	1,967
Chaves	4,241	26.85%	10,211	64.64%	1,345	8.51%	-5,970	-37.79%	15,797
Cibola	3,729	56.41%	2,874	43.48%	7	0.11%	855	12.93%	6,610
Colfax	2,147	44.69%	2,651	55.18%	6	0.12%	-504	-10.49%	4,804
Curry	2,578	25.60%	7,465	74.13%	27	0.27%	-4,887	-48.53%	10,070
De Baca	187	26.01%	528	73.44%	4	0.56%	-341	-47.43%	719
Doña Ana	32,010	56.38%	24,573	43.28%	195	0.34%	7,437	13.10%	56,778
Eddy	3,764	23.03%	12,063	73.80%	518	3.17%	-8,299	-50.77%	16,345
Grant	6,393	55.79%	5,056	44.12%	11	0.10%	1,337	11.67%	11,460
Guadalupe	1,008	61.20%	639	38.80%	0	0.00%	369	22.40%	1,647
Harding	113	27.97%	291	72.03%	0	0.00%	-178	-44.06%	404
Hidalgo	641	42.90%	853	57.10%	0	0.00%	-212	-14.19%	1,494
Lea	2,368	17.21%	11,053	80.33%	338	2.46%	-8,685	-63.12%	13,759
Lincoln	2,415	29.47%	5,682	69.33%	99	1.21%	-3,267	-39.86%	8,196
Los Alamos	6,416	64.32%	3,535	35.44%	24	0.24%	2,881	28.88%	9,975
Luna	2,569	44.97%	3,138	54.93%	6	0.11%	-569	-9.96%	5,713
McKinley	12,959	70.02%	5,516	29.80%	32	0.17%	7,443	40.22%	18,507
Mora	1,610	70.21%	673	29.35%	10	0.44%	937	40.86%	2,293
Otero	5,947	34.41%	11,084	64.12%	254	1.47%	-5,137	-29.72%	17,285
Quay	867	29.17%	2,105	70.83%	0	0.00%	-1,238	-41.66%	2,972
Rio Arriba	8,707	70.31%	3,672	29.65%	5	0.04%	5,035	40.66%	12,384
Roosevelt	1,143	24.90%	3,378	73.59%	69	1.50%	-2,235	-48.69%	4,590
San Juan	13,528	34.53%	25,561	65.25%	85	0.22%	-12,033	-30.72%	39,174
San Miguel	6,748	73.61%	2,409	26.28%	10	0.11%	4,339	47.33%	9,167
Sandoval	31,787	53.05%	28,002	46.74%	126	0.21%	3,785	6.32%	59,915
Santa Fe	53,049	77.46%	15,321	22.37%	116	0.17%	37,728	55.09%	68,486
Sierra	1,851	38.48%	2,957	61.48%	2	0.04%	-1,106	-22.99%	4,810
Socorro	3,135	53.19%	2,749	46.64%	10	0.17%	386	6.55%	5,894
Taos	10,414	79.68%	2,648	20.26%	7	0.05%	7,766	59.42%	13,069
Torrance	1,782	32.88%	3,596	66.36%	41	0.76%	-1,814	-33.47%	5,419
Union	347	24.08%	1,090	75.64%	4	0.28%	-743	-51.56%	1,441
Valencia	10,957	43.94%	13,913	55.80%	65	0.26%	-2,956	-11.85%	24,935
Totals	379,621	54.67%	310,853	44.76%	3,950	0.57%	68,768	9.90%	694,424
