= Musixmatch =

Music data company

- Latest Musixmatch logo, as of 2024
- Website type: Music metadata database service
- Founded: January 21, 2010; 16 years ago
- Headquarters: Bologna, Italy; London, England
- Area served: Worldwide
- Founders: Massimo Ciociola, Gianluca Delli Carri, Francesco Delfino, Giuseppe Costantino
- CEO: Massimo Ciociola
- Industry: Music
- Employees: 120+
- Website: musixmatch.com
- Launched: January 21, 2010; 16 years ago
- Current status: Active
- Native clients on: Windows, Linux, Macintosh, Windows Phone, Android, iOS, Google Chrome, Spotify, WatchOS, Wear OS, Android TV, Tidal, Instagram, Amazon Alexa, Amazon Music, Apple Music, TVOS, Google Search, Shazam, Facebook, Website, JioSaavn, Last.fm, Vevo, Microsoft Bing

Musixmatch is an Italian music data company and platform for users to search and share song lyrics with translations. Musixmatch has 80 million users (50 million active users), 12 million songs with their respective lyrics, and 115+ employees. In 2022, Musixmatch launched Musixmatch Podcasts, a platform for transcription that uses artificial intelligence and community.

== Overview ==
Musixmatch's mobile app displays lyrics synchronized with the music being played. Its native apps can scan all the songs in a user's music library, find lyrics, and be used as a music player.

=== Features ===
In October 2022, Musixmatch launched Podcast, a platform that generates transcription every day for podcast episodes across different topics and charts, using its NLP base model architecture, Umberto, to tag keywords such as places, people and topics that are linked to topics on Wikipedia.

== History ==
Musixmatch was originally conceived in early 2007 by Massimo Ciociola, who later founded the company in 2010 in Bologna with Francesco Delfino, Giuseppe Costantino, Gianluca Delli Carri and Valerio Paolini.

Musixmatch went live in July 2010, and by January 2015 had raised $14.1 million (USD) in angel and venture capital funding. Early backers included angel investor Paolo Barberis in 2011, followed by venture capital firms P101 SGR and United Ventures, which supported the company's growth through several funding rounds until the entry of TPG Growth in July 2022.

Musixmatch has signed agreements with publishers such as EMI Publishing, Warner/Chappell Music, Universal Music Publishing, Sony ATV, Kobalt, Peer Music and Disney Music.

The company provided Spotify's lyrics user interface on Spotify Desktop until this service was discontinued in May 2016, and again after November 2019 in certain regions. As of November 2021, this feature is available worldwide.

In April 2016, Musixmatch partnered with Apple Music to provide lyrics, including word-synced lyrics.

In June 2019, Musixmatch launched a partnership with Instagram, allowing all users to add Lyrics Stickers to any Instagram Music Story.

In September 2019, Marco Paglia, a Senior Product Director at Uber with past experience at Google, YouTube, Nokia, joined Musixmatch as Chief Product Officer.

In July 2022, Musixmatch announced a strategic significant investment from TPG. As part of the deal, David Trujillo and Jacqui Hawwa joined the Musixmatch's board of directors. At that time, Gianluca delli Carri left the company to pursue his personal goals.

In February 2022 Giuseppe Costantino left the company to pursue his personal goals although remaining an investor.

On November 30, 2023, Musixmatch announced the appointment of Rio Caraeff, the former Founder and CEO of Vevo, as its Chief Business Officer

In May 2024, Musixmatch implemented new verification requirements for users contributing lyrics to the platform. The company began requiring all curators to upload a selfie with a valid government-issued photo ID before being allowed to add new lyrics from their mission system.

On November 4, 2024, Musixmatch announced the appointment of Marco Paglia and Rio Caraeff as co-presidents, marking a significant leadership milestone for the company

On March 5, 2025, Canadian rival competitor LyricFind filed an antitrust lawsuit against Musixmatch and its private equity owner TPG Growth through the United States District Court for the Northern District of California. In the document, LyricFind accused Musixmatch of eight federal antitrust violations and five state law claims after the latter service signed an exclusive partnership with Warner Chappell Music.

On October 21, 2026, Musixmatch announced that it would close the Musixmatch Podcasts service.
