= Michael A. Montoya =

American politician

Michael Montoya

26th Treasurer of New Mexico
- In office 1996–2002
- Governor: Gary Johnson
- Preceded by: David W. King
- Succeeded by: Robert E. Vigil

Personal details
- Born: May 4, 1952 (age 73)
- Party: Democratic
- Education: University of Colorado Boulder (BS)

Michael A. Montoya (born May 4, 1952) is an American politician and former Certified Public Accountant who served as the 26th New Mexico State Treasurer from 1996 to 2002. Montoya was the first Hispanic-American elected to the position.

== Early life and education ==
Montoya is a native of Los Lunas, New Mexico. He earned a Bachelor of Science degree in accounting from the University of Colorado Boulder.

== Career ==
After earning his bachelor's degree Montoya, worked as a senior tax manager at Ernst & Young. He then served as director of the New Mexico Medicaid Fraud Unit and as Deputy New Mexico State Auditor. In 1990, Montoya ran unsuccessfully for New Mexico State Treasurer. In 1992 and 1993, he served as the deputy state auditor and director of the office's Medicaid Fraud Unit. In 2002, he launched an unsuccessful campaign for New Mexico's 2nd congressional district, losing to incumbent Joe Skeen. Montoya was elected the 26th New Mexico State Treasurer in 1995, the first Hispanic-American to serve in the role. Montoya left office in 2002 and was succeeded by Robert E. Vigil.

=== Arrest and conviction ===
In 2005, Montoya and Vigil were arrested for accepting kickbacks from financial advisors. In 2007, Montoya was fined $25,000 and sentenced to 40 months in prison after pleading guilty to federal racketeering and extortion charges. Montoya completed his sentence at a low-security prison in Colorado.
