= Bill Mattiace =

American politician and businessman

Member of the Las Cruces City Council from the 2nd District
- Incumbent
- Assumed office 2023
- Preceded by: Tessa Abyeta

Mayor of Las Cruces
- In office 2003–2007
- Preceded by: Rubén Smith
- Succeeded by: Ken Miyagishima

Personal details
- Party: Republican

William "Bill" Mattiace is an American politician and businessman who currently serves as a member of the Las Cruces City Council and previously served as the mayor of Las Cruces from 2003 to 2007.

== Early and personal life ==
Mattiace is originally from Long Island, moving to Las Cruces to attend New Mexico State University for Elementary Education. In 1976, Mattiace opened Las Cruces Vocational College, which later became Doña Ana Community College. He also worked at several local car dealerships.

== Political career ==
=== Mayorship ===
Mattiace was elected Mayor of Las Cruces in 2003. That same year, he was criticized for conducting business with fellow councilmembers, leading his office to remove their doors to increase perceptions of transparency.

In 2007, Mattiace lost re-election against then-Las Cruces City Council member and Democrat Ken Miyagishima by 80 votes.

After his mayorship, Mattiace also served as executive director of the New Mexico Border Authority.

==== 2019 election ====
Mattiace ran in the 2019 mayoral election in Las Cruces, seeking to unseat Miyagishima's attempt at a fourth term. Mattiace lost to Miyagishima in the instant runoff ranked-choice voting, having initially garnered around 20% of the vote to Miyagishima's 37%.

=== Las Cruces City Council ===
Mattiace ran in the 2023 election for the 2nd District on the Las Cruces City Council, seeking to unseat the incumbent, Democrat Tessa Abyeta. His platform was focused on public safety and economic development. Mattiace won the election narrowly, and after Doña Ana County Clerk Amanda López Askin stated there would be no recount (due to the vote difference being above the 1% threshold), Mattiace was confirmed the winner.

During his tenure on the City Council, he has established himself as pro-business, and also criticizing city ordinance which altered zoning regulations.
