= James B. Lewis =

American politician

24th and 29th Treasurer of New Mexico
- In office 2007–2015
- Governor: Susana Martinez
- Preceded by: Douglas M. Brown
- Succeeded by: Tim Eichenberg
- In office 1985–1991
- Governor: Toney Anaya; Garrey Carruthers
- Preceded by: Earl E. Hartley
- Succeeded by: David W. King

Personal details
- Born: James Beliven Lewis; November 30, 1947 (age 78) Roswell, New Mexico, U.S.
- Party: Democratic
- Education: Bishop College (BS); National American University (BS); University of New Mexico (MPA)

Military service
- Branch/service: United States Army
- Battles/wars: Vietnam War

James Beliven Lewis (born November 30, 1947) is an American politician from the state of New Mexico. A member of the Democratic Party, he served as the state treasurer of New Mexico from 1985–1990 and from 2006–2014. As of 2024, he is the only African American to serve in the role.

== Early life and education ==
Lewis was born in Roswell, New Mexico, the son of Dorris Ward and William Reagor. After graduating from Gallup High School, he earned a Bachelor of Science degree in education from Bishop College and a Bachelor of Science in business administration from the National American University in Albuquerque. Lewis served in the United States Army for two years as a military policeman during the Vietnam Era. He later received his Master of Public Administration from the University of New Mexico.

== Career ==
When he returned to the state, Lewis worked for the New Mexico State Personnel Office and the Public Service Career Office, specializing in minority recruitment. He then became director of the African American Studies Division under the Multi-cultural Enrichment Program.

He worked as a personnel counselor and administrator at the University of Albuquerque. He later worked for the Bernalillo County district attorney's office as a criminal investigator. Lewis was elected Bernalillo County treasurer in 1982, becoming the first African American to win a countywide election in New Mexico. He won re-election in 1984.

In December 1985, Governor Toney Anaya appointed Lewis as state treasurer after Earl Hartley pleaded guilty to misusing funds of the Western State Treasurers Association. He completed that term and ran for a full term in 1986, becoming the first African American elected to a statewide office in New Mexico.

Governor Bruce King appointed him chief of staff in November 1990. After Bruce King's defeat in the election of 1994, Lewis served four months as acting director of the Oil, Gas, and Minerals Division of the New Mexico Land Office. In April 1995, he was appointed chief clerk of the New Mexico Corporation Commission. In 1996, Lewis was appointed city administrator of Rio Rancho and later that year was appointed as head of the Office of Economic Development and Diversity at the United States Department of Energy by president Bill Clinton. He later served under United States Secretary of Energy Bill Richardson.

In 2001, Lewis ran for the mayor of Albuquerque, losing to Martin Chávez. Following the election, he was appointed Albuquerque's COO. Lewis also served as chief administrative officer for the city of Albuquerque, the highest-ranking position for an African American in the city's history. He retired in 2005.

In 2006, Lewis ran again for position of state treasurer and won, serving until he was term-limited in 2014. In October 2007, State Treasurer James B. Lewis was elected president of the Western State Treasurers Association. In 2010, Lewis was president of the National Association of State Treasurers. In 2011 he received NAST's Jesse M. Unruh Award for current state treasurers. In 2014, Lewis was elected president of the National Association of Auditors, Comptrollers and State Treasurers.

Political offices
Preceded by Douglas M. Brown	Treasurer of New Mexico; 1986–1990	Succeeded by David W. King
