= Douglas M. Brown =

American businessman and politician

Douglas Brown

28th Treasurer of New Mexico
- In office 2005–2006
- Governor: Bill Richardson
- Preceded by: Robert E. Vigil
- Succeeded by: James B. Lewis

Personal details
- Party: Republican
- Education: Stanford University (AB, MBA)

Douglas M. Brown is an American businessman and academic who briefly served as the 28th New Mexico State Treasurer after the resignation and conviction of Robert E. Vigil. In 2019, Brown was nominated to serve as the president of the University of New Mexico Board of Regents.

== Education ==
Brown earned a Bachelor of Arts and Master of Business Administration from Stanford University, graduating in the top five percent of his class.

== Career ==
From 1990 to 1999, Brown worked as the president and CEO of Talbot Financial Services. The company was later acquired by Safeco. From 1999 to 2005, Brown worked as the president of the Tuition Plan Consortium, an organization of public and private universities offering the 529 plan.

When incumbent New Mexico Treasurer Robert E. Vigil was convicted of extortion, money laundering and racketeering, Brown was appointed by then-Governor Bill Richardson. In the role, Brown worked to manage New Mexico's budget while repairing the agency's reputation. Brown left office in late-2006 after the election of James B. Lewis. From 2009 to 2014, Brown served as the Dean of the Anderson School of Management at the University of New Mexico. In 2014 and 2015, Brown served as the president and CEO of the First National Bank of Santa Fe. In 2019, Brown was nominated to serve as president of the University of New Mexico Board of Regents by Governor Michelle Lujan Grisham. His term expired in 2022.
