= Robert E. Vigil =

American politician

27th Treasurer of New Mexico
- In office January 1, 2003 – October 26, 2005
- Governor: Bill Richardson
- Preceded by: Michael A. Montoya
- Succeeded by: Douglas M. Brown

23rd Auditor of New Mexico
- In office January 1, 1991 – January 1, 1999
- Governor: Bruce King; Gary Johnson
- Preceded by: Harrold H. Adams
- Succeeded by: Domingo Martinez

Personal details
- Born: October 26, 1953 (age 72)
- Party: Democratic

Robert E. Vigil (born October 26, 1953) is an American politician from the U.S. state of New Mexico. He was twice elected New Mexico State Auditor, serving from 1991 to 1998 and was New Mexico State Treasurer from 2003 until his resignation on October 26, 2005.

== Arrest and conviction ==
Vigil, his predecessor, Michael A. Montoya, and two others were indicted on 28 counts of extortion, money laundering and racketeering by a federal jury. Vigil's first trial ended in a hung jury, but was convicted in a second trial of one count of attempted extortion while being acquitted of 23 other extortion and racketeering charges. He was sentenced to 37 months in prison, serving his term in Colorado and Texas. He was moved to a halfway house in June 2009 before being released on probation in December the same year.

Political offices
Preceded by Harrold H. Adams	Auditor of New Mexico; 1991–1998	Succeeded by Domingo Martinez
Preceded by Michael A. Montoya	Treasurer of New Mexico; 2003–2005	Succeeded by Douglas M. Brown
