= LyricFind =

Canadian lyrics database

- Type: Private
- Industry: Music industry, Digital rights management
- Genre: Music technology
- Founded: 2004 (as consumer site); 2005 (as licensing business)
- Founders: Darryl Ballantyne (CEO); Mohamed Moutadayne (CTO); Chris Book
- Headquarters: 40 Eglinton Avenue East, Suite 400, Toronto, Ontario, Canada
- Area served: Worldwide
- Key people: Darryl Ballantyne (CEO); Robert Singerman (SVP International Publishing)
- Products: Lyric licensing, data synchronization, lyric videos, LyricIQ
- Revenue: Over $25 million paid to rightsholders (2024)
- Number of employees: ~100 (2024)
- Website: www.lyricfind.com

LyricFind is a Canadian provider of licensed music lyrics and data. In 2005, the company signed the first-ever lyric licensing deal with EMI Music Publishing (now part of Sony Music Publishing). As of January 2025, LyricFind has over 12 million songs in its lyric licensing database, including over 1.3 million word-by-word synced songs. The company is based in Toronto.

== Background ==
LyricFind was co-founded by CEO Darryl Ballantyne, CTO Mohamed Moutadayne, and Board of Directors member Chris Book, who launched an early consumer-focused version of the site while they were students at the University of Waterloo. After meeting music executive Ted Cohen at the Canadian Music Week conference (now Departure Festival + Conference), Ballantyne was hired as an intern at EMI and eventually convinced Cohen to join the LyricFind Board of Directors. Ballantyne then secured the company’s first lyric licenses with Cohen’s help, including with major music publisher EMI Music Publishing, and officially launched LyricFind as a lyric licensing business. By 2012, the company had secured global rights deals with all four major music publishers. In 2024, LyricFind partnered with over 50,000 publishers and facilitated over $25 million in payments to rightsholders over the course of the year. Ballantyne was also named to the 2024 Billboard Canada Power Players list.

In 2007, LyricFind partnered with RealNetworks to bring searchable lyrics to Rhapsody Online (now Napster), one of the first music streaming services. It later partnered with Gracenote in 2013 to power all of that company’s lyric services and Google in 2016 to display lyrics directly in Google Search for the first time.

LyricFind also powers Billboard’s LyricFind U.S. and LyricFind Global charts, which were launched in 2015 and remain active as of 2025. Each week, these charts rank trending songs that have seen a surge in lyrics searches, based on lyric displays across all of LyricFind’s clients.

In 2020, LyricFind expanded its operations in Asia and Africa, establishing a new language team in India to focus on transcribing lyrics in Hindi, Punjabi, and Marathi. Its team in Vietnam was also expanded to add Cantonese and Mandarin translations to its existing Malay, Bahasa, Thai, Tagalog, and Vietnamese lyrics. Additionally, its Johannesburg team was tasked with covering southern African languages such as Afrikaans, Zulu, Sotho, and Xhosa.

In 2021, LyricFind launched a video creation tool enabling users to automatically generate lyric videos with custom backgrounds, fonts, and visualizers. After acquiring Rotor Videos in 2023, LyricFind expanded those capabilities to include music videos, social media videos, and animated album art for Spotify Canvas and Apple Music Album Motion. The tool, named Videos by LyricFind, has since been integrated into CD Baby.

== Lawsuit against Musixmatch and TPG Growth ==
LyricFind filed an antitrust lawsuit against Musixmatch and its private equity owner, TPG Growth, in March 2025. Filed in the United States District Court for the Northern District of California, the suit alleged eight federal antitrust violations and five state law claims. These allegations stem from an exclusive lyric rights and data licensing agreement that Musixmatch and TPG signed with major music publisher Warner Chappell Music, which would require digital service providers to use Musixmatch for all lyrics owned or partly owned by Warner Chappell. Musixmatch and TPG sought to have the case dismissed in June 2025, alleging an improper venue and arguing that LyricFind’s case did not meet antitrust requirements. In September 2025, the court allowed the majority of LyricFind’s claims to proceed. The case is ongoing.
