= Darius Holland =

American football player (born 1973)

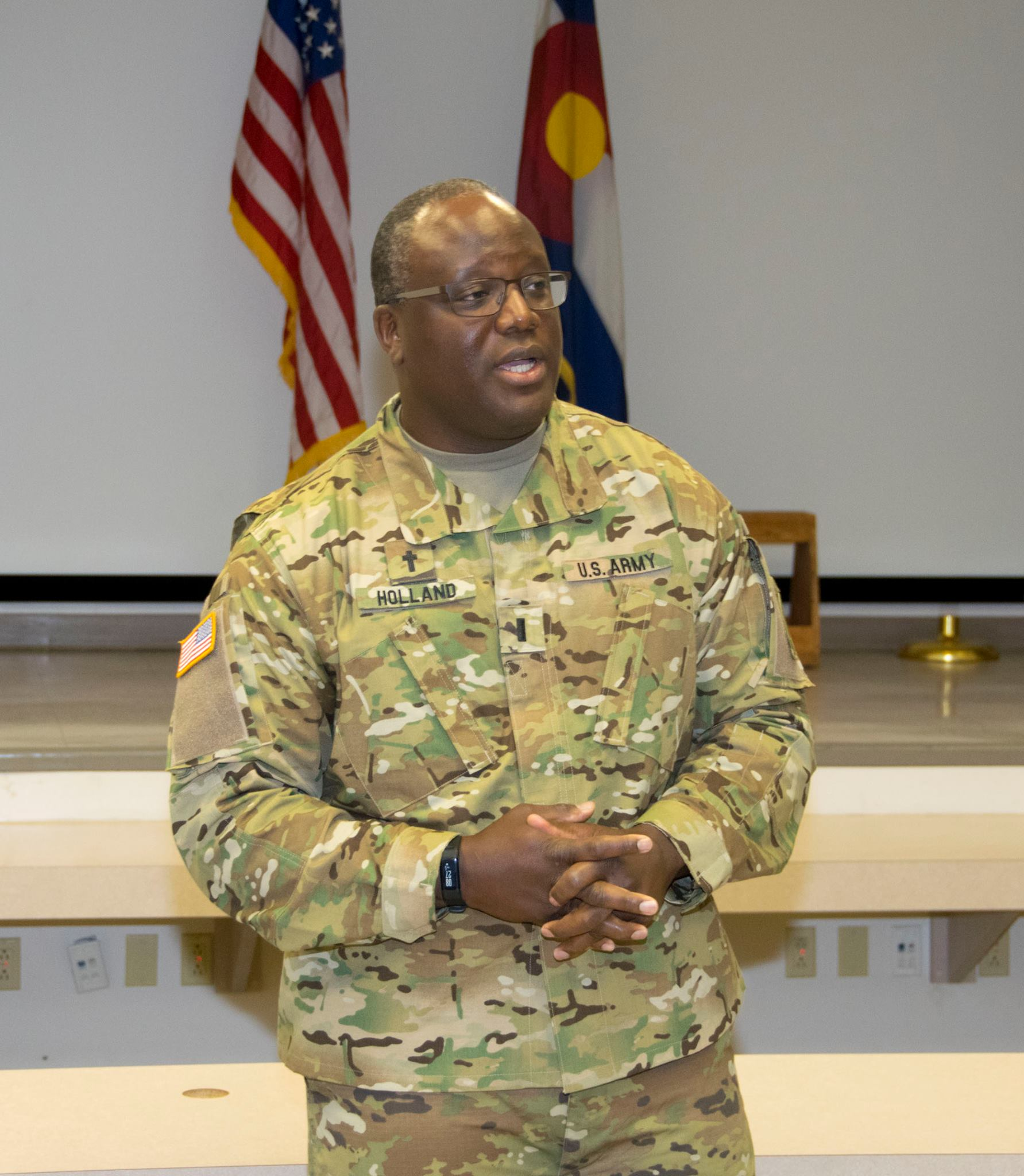
- Holland speaking at a Spiritual Fitness Breakfast in 2017

No. 90, 99, 73, 93
- Position: Defensive tackle

Personal information
- Born: November 10, 1973 (age 52); Petersburg, Virginia, U.S.
- Listed height: 6 ft 5 in (1.96 m)
- Listed weight: 330 lb (150 kg)

Career information
- High school: Mayfield (Las Cruces, New Mexico)
- College: Colorado
- NFL draft: 1995: 3rd round, 65th overall pick

Career history
- Green Bay Packers (1995–1997); Kansas City Chiefs (1998); Detroit Lions (1998); Cleveland Browns (1999–2000); Minnesota Vikings (2002); Denver Broncos (2003–2004)

Awards and highlights
- Super Bowl champion (XXXI)

Career NFL statistics
- Tackles: 155
- Sacks: 4.5
- Fumble recoveries: 1
- Stats at Pro Football Reference

Other information
- Military career
- Allegiance: United States
- Branch: Army
- Service years: 2017 – present
- Rank: Captain

Darius Jerome Holland (born November 10, 1973) is a U.S. Army chaplain and former professional football player who was a defensive tackle for nine seasons in the National Football League (NFL). After attending Mayfield High School in Las Cruces, New Mexico, and playing college football for the Colorado Buffaloes, he was selected 65th overall by the Green Bay Packers in the third round of the 1995 NFL draft. During his time in the NFL, he played for the Packers, Chiefs, Lions, Browns, Vikings, and Broncos. He left the NFL in 2004. Ordained as a Baptist minister in 2015, he served as a pastor for over ten years and joined the Colorado Army National Guard as a military chaplain in 2017. He joined active duty in 2020, and as of 2025 is a reservist.

== Early life ==
Darius Jerome Holland was born on November 10, 1973, in Petersburg, Virginia. He grew up on a military base, and attended Catholic services with his mother. His father died when he was 12 years old.

Holland attended Mayfield High School in Las Cruces, New Mexico, and was an all-state player at the defensive tackle position. He attended college at the University of Colorado at Boulder, where he was a "standout" player according to the Albuquerque Journal. In his last year at Boulder, he started every game and made 77 tackles. The Associated Press named him as an honorable mention in the Big Eight Conference. He finished his college career in the 1995 Hula Bowl.

== NFL career ==
In the 1995 NFL draft, the Green Bay Packers selected him as the first pick in the third round, 65th overall. Holland played with the Packers from 1995 to 1997, including their win in Super Bowl XXXI. While with the Packers, he changed from defensive tackle to defensive end. On May 13, 1998, the Packers traded Holland to the Kansas City Chiefs for Vaughn Booker. In October 1998, the Chiefs waived Holland; shortly thereafter, the Detroit Lions signed him.

Holland played for the Cleveland Browns in 1999 and 2000. After being released by the Browns following the 2000 season, Holland did not play in 2001; he was signed by the Minnesota Vikings in May 2002. He joined the Denver Broncos in 2003. With the Broncos, he was Team Representative from 2003-2004. In December 2004, Denver waived Holland.

== Ministry ==
While he grew up attending Catholic services with his mother, he did not pay much attention. At the end of his NFL career, Holland found himself at a low point and began practicing Christianity again. Holland earned a Master of Theological Studies from Gateway Seminary in 2015, and a Doctorate of Ministry in 2021. He served as the pastor at True Life Church in Thornton, Colorado, for more than ten years. Holland is a Southern Baptist. During his time with the Green Bay Packers Holland played alongside Reggie White, who was an ordained minister at the same time as being a player.

=== Military ===
A veteran suicide near his home inspired him to look into Army chaplaincy. In 2017, Holland was commissioned as a chaplain in the Colorado National Guard. In 2020, he joined active duty and was assigned to Fort Bragg. As of 2025, he is in the Army Reserve and the chaplain of a recruiting battalion at Fort Knox, and holds the rank of Captain.
