= Eric Enriquez =

American politician

Mayor of Las Cruces
- Incumbent
- Assumed office December 18, 2023
- Preceded by: Ken Miyagishima

Personal details
- Born: Las Cruces, New Mexico
- Party: Democratic

Eric Enriquez is an American politician and fireman who has served as the mayor of Las Cruces, New Mexico, since 2023.

== Early life and career ==
Enriquez is a native of Las Cruces, and attended Mayfield High School, whose renovation he advocated for during his mayorship. His family has been residents of Las Cruces since the 1800s.

Enriquez graduated from the fire academy in 1997 and the Las Cruces Police Academy in 2003, also earning a degree in business administration and finance from New Mexico State University. After moving to Hobbs to serve as fire marshal from 2009 to 2016, he became Fire Chief of Las Cruces that same year. He served as assistant city manager from 2020 to 2022. He had also served on boards for multiple local charity organizations.

== Mayorship ==
=== 2023 election ===
Enriquez ran for mayor of Las Cruces in 2023 to replace long-term mayor Ken Miyagishima. The election, which was resolved after six rounds of ranked-choice voting, announced Enriquez as the victor. He had received 29% of the vote in the preliminary round, and 52% in the final round. His campaign had focused on public safety and economic development.

=== Tenure ===
Along with El Paso mayor Renard Johnson and Ciudad Juárez mayor Cruz Pérez Cuéllar, Enriquez publicly criticized tariffs instilled by the Trump administration, as well as its immigration policy.
