= David Trujillo =

American businessman

- Born: c. 1976
- Education: Yale University; Stanford University
- Occupation: Businessman

David Trujillo (born c. 1976) is an American businessman. He is a partner and principal of the private equity firm TPG Capital, and a member of the board of directors of many companies, including Uber and Musixmatch

== Early life ==
Trujillo was born circa 1976. His parents were immigrants from Colombia. He grew up in suburban Chicago.

Trujillo graduated from Yale University, where he earned a bachelor's degree in Economics, and he earned a master in business administration from the Stanford Graduate School of Business.

== Career ==
Trujillo began his career as an analyst for Merrill Lynch. He was vice president of GTCR from 1998 to 2005. He joined the private equity firm TPG Capital in 2006, where he became a partner and principal. He focuses on investment in the technology industry.

Trujillo serves on the board of directors of Univision, Cirque du Soleil, the RCN Corporation, Vice Media, and the Creative Artists Agency. and Musixmatch . He succeeded David Bonderman as a director of Uber in June 2017.
