= List of mayors of Rio Rancho, New Mexico =

Mayors of the city of Rio Rancho, New Mexico, USA

The following is a list of mayors of the city of Rio Rancho, New Mexico, U.S.

== Mayors ==
- William Howden, ca.1981
- Terry Griffin, 1986–1987
- Grover Nash, ca.1987–1990
- Pat D'Arco, ca.1990–1994
- Jim Owen, ca.1999–2004
- Kevin Jackson, ca.2006–2007
- Thomas E. Swisstack, ca.2010–2014
- Gregg D. Hull, 2014–2026
- Paul Wymer, 2026–present

== See also ==
- Rio Rancho history
