= Reena Szczepanski =

American politician in New Mexico

Majority Leader of the New Mexico House of Representatives
- Incumbent
- Assumed office January 21, 2025
- Preceded by: Gail Chasey

Member of the New Mexico House of Representatives from the 47th district
- Incumbent
- Assumed office January 17, 2023
- Preceded by: Brian Egolf

Personal details
- Born: 1976 or 1977 (age 49–50) Decatur, Georgia, U.S.
- Party: Democratic
- Children: 2
- Education: Brown University (BS)

Reena Szczepanski (born 1976/1977) is an American politician who is a member of the New Mexico House of Representatives for the 47th district who was elected in November 2022.

== Early life and education ==
The daughter of immigrants from India, Szczepanski was born and raised in Decatur, Georgia. She earned a Bachelor of Science degree in human biology and community health from Brown University.

== Career ==
Szczepanski spent six years as director of the New Mexico chapter of the Drug Policy Alliance. From 2006 to 2016, she was the executive director of Emerge New Mexico, an organization that recruits women to run for office. Szczepanski was president of the New Mexico Public Health Association and chair of the Santa Fe County Health Policy and Planning Commission. From 2017 to 2022, Szczepanski served as chief of staff for Speaker Brian Egolf. After Egolf announced that he would not seek re-election to the New Mexico House of Representatives in 2022, Szczepanski declared her candidacy to succeed him. She ran unopposed in the November general election and assumed office on January 17, 2023.

New Mexico House of Representatives
Preceded by Gail Chasey	Majority Leader of the New Mexico House of Representatives; 2025–present	Incumbent
