= Tim Eichenberg =

American politician

30th Treasurer of New Mexico
- In office January 1, 2015 – January 1, 2023
- Governor: Susana Martinez; Michelle Lujan Grisham
- Preceded by: James Lewis
- Succeeded by: Laura Montoya

Member of the New Mexico Senate from the 15th district
- In office January 2009 – January 2013
- Preceded by: Diane Snyder
- Succeeded by: Daniel Ivey-Soto

Personal details
- Born: 1951 (age 74–75)
- Party: Democratic
- Spouse: Sandra
- Children: 2
- Education: University of New Mexico (BA)

Tim Eichenberg (born 1951) is an American politician from the state of New Mexico. A member of the Democratic Party, he served as the state treasurer of New Mexico.

== Early life and education ==
Eichenberg was raised in Albuquerque, New Mexico. He attended Albuquerque Public Schools and was graduated from the University of New Mexico.

== Career ==
Eichenberg began his career as a real estate broker and property tax consultant for New Mexico Property Tax Consultants in Albuquerque, New Mexico.

Eichenberg was elected as the treasurer for Bernalillo County, New Mexico, in 1974. He served for two terms and was re-elected in 1976. In 2004, Eichenberg served as the property tax director for the New Mexico Taxation and Revenue Department during the tenure of Bill Richardson. In his position, he supervised the work of all New Mexico county assessors.

Eichenberg was elected to the New Mexico Senate in 2008 and assumed office in January 2009. During his tenure, he served on the public affairs and judiciary committees. In 2010, Eichenberg carried the NM Governmental Conduct Act, establishing a code of ethics for all state government employees. Though he initially filed to run for re-election in 2012, he withdrew from the race on June 5, 2012.

Eichenberg was elected as 30th state treasurer of New Mexico in 2014. He was re-elected in 2018.

On January 1, 2025, he was sworn in as Bernalillo County's treasurer.

== Personal life ==
Eichenberg and his wife, Sandra, have two adult children. He is a member of the Knights of Columbus and has served on the boards for the National Kidney Foundation and the Arthritis Foundation.

In 1994, Eichenberg was charged with a misdemeanor for illegally carrying a firearm in his carry-on luggage while attempting to board a plane in Austin, Texas.

In 2015, a complaint was filed against then state treasurer Eichenberg accusing him of sexism and racism. When asked if he's ever made sexist or racist remarks to any state employees, Eichenberg said, "In my opinion, it's nothing more than sensationalism, and it's very politically motivated." The state personnel office, run by then governor Susana Martinez's administration, cut ties with Eichenberg, according to the Albuquerque Journal and an official letter sent to Eichenberg by the state personnel office.

== Electoral history ==
New Mexico State Senate 15th District Democratic Primary Election, 2008
| Party | Candidate | Votes | % |
| Democratic | Tim Eichenberg | 2,413 | 59.36 |
| Democratic | John Blair | 1,652 | 40.64 |

New Mexico State Senate 15th District Election, 2008
| Party | Candidate | Votes | % |
| Democratic | Tim Eichenberg | 12,643 | 56.52 |
| Republican | Diane Snyder | 9,728 | 43.48 |

New Mexico Treasurer Democratic Primary Election, 2014
| Party | Candidate | Votes | % |
| Democratic | Tim Eichenberg | 59,683 | 52.72 |
| Democratic | John Wertheim | 53,523 | 47.28 |

New Mexico Treasurer Election, 2014
| Party | Candidate | Votes | % |
| Democratic | Tim Eichenberg | 261,203 | 52.46 |
| Republican | Rick Lopez | 236.699 | 47.54 |

New Mexico Treasurer Democratic Primary Election, 2018
| Party | Candidate | Votes | % |
| Democratic | Tim Eichenberg | 141,227 | 100.0 |

New Mexico Treasurer Election, 2018
| Party | Candidate | Votes | % |
| Democratic | Tim Eichenberg | 394,780 | 57.9 |
| Republican | Arthur Castillo | 286,822 | 42.1 |

New Mexico Senate
| Preceded by Diane Snyder | Member of the New Mexico Senate from the 15th district 2009–2013 | Succeeded by Daniel Ivey-Soto |
Political offices
| Preceded by James B. Lewis | Treasurer of New Mexico; 2015–2023 | Succeeded by Laura Montoya |
