= List of mayors of Las Cruces, New Mexico =

Mayors of the city of Las Cruces, New Mexico, USA

The following is a list of mayors of the city of Las Cruces, New Mexico, USA.

== Mayors ==
1. Martin Lohman, 1907–1908
2. R.L. Young, 1908–1912
3. J.P. Mitchel, 1912–1913
4. Edwin C. Wade, 1913–1914
5. R.P. Porter, 1914–1916
6. John May, 1916–1918
7. A.I. Kelso, 1918–1920
8. J.H. Paxton, 1920–1922
9. A.I. Kelso, 1922–1924
10. Gus Manassee, 1924–1926
11. A.I. Kelso, 1926–1930
12. Uil Lane 1929
13. T.C Sexton, 1930–1932
14. Sam Klein, 1932–1934
15. J. Benson Newell, 1934–1936
16. George Frenger, 1936–1938
17. Sam Klein, 1938–1944
18. Edwin L. Mechem, 1944–1946
19. Sam Klein, 1946–1948
20. James D. McElhannon, 1948–1949
21. Sam Klein, 1949–1953
22. M. F. Apodaca, 1953–1955
23. James E. Neleigh, 1955–1961
24. Edward R. Gutierrez, 1961–1962
25. Edward O. Noble, 1962–1963
26. Thomas J. Graham, 1963–1974
27. Robert Munson, 1974–1976
28. Albert Johnson, 1976–1980
29. Joseph A. Camunez, 1980–1982
30. David Steinborn, 1982–1987
31. Herculano Ferralez, 1987–1989
32. Tommy Tomlin, 1989–1991
33. Rubén Smith, 1991–2003
34. Bill Mattiace, 2003–2007
35. Ken Miyagishima, 2007–2023
36. Eric Enriquez, 2024–present

== See also ==
- Las Cruces history
