= Gregg Hull =

American politician and businessman

Mayor of Rio Rancho
- In office 2014–2026
- Preceded by: Thomas Swisstack
- Succeeded by: Paul Wymer

Personal details
- Born: June 29, 1966 (age 60) Oklahoma, U.S.
- Party: Republican
- Children: 5
- Website: Campaign website

Greggory D. Hull is an American politician and businessman who served as mayor of Rio Rancho, New Mexico, from 2014 to April 2026, making him the longest-serving mayor in Rio Rancho history. Hull was the Republican nominee in the 2026 New Mexico gubernatorial election, losing to Democrat Deb Haaland.

== Early life and career ==
Hull was born on June 29, 1966 in Oklahoma. He has lived in New Mexico for more than 35 years and was a small businessman in Rio Rancho before serving as mayor. He graduated from Pagosa Springs High School in Colorado.

== Career ==
=== Mayor of Rio Rancho ===
Hull was first elected in 2014 in a runoff election and was re-elected in both 2018 and 2022. Rio Rancho, the state's third-largest city, was the fastest-growing city in New Mexico while he was mayor. While he was mayor, Hull doubled the city's police budget and pursued pro-business economic development policies. In November 2025, he announced he would not seek a fourth term in order to focus on his gubernatorial campaign.

=== 2026 gubernatorial campaign ===
In April 2025, Hull became the first Republican to signal his intention to enter the race for governor. After a statewide listening tour over the following months, he officially launched his campaign in October 2025, running on a platform focusing on public safety and economic growth.

In March 2026, the GOP pre-primary in Ruidoso gave Hull the clear majority, with many observers declaring him the 'favorite' for the Republican nomination. He won the Republican primary held on June 2 and faced Democrat Deb Haaland in the general election. Haaland ended up winning the race by 14 percentage points.

== Personal life ==
Hull married his first wife, Charlene, when he was 20 and she was 17.

Hull and his second wife, Carrie, have been married for more than 25 years and have 5 children and 8 grandchildren. They live in Rio Rancho.

Party political offices
Preceded by Mark Ronchetti	Republican nominee for Governor of New Mexico; 2026	Most recent
