= Stephanie Garcia Richard =

American politician

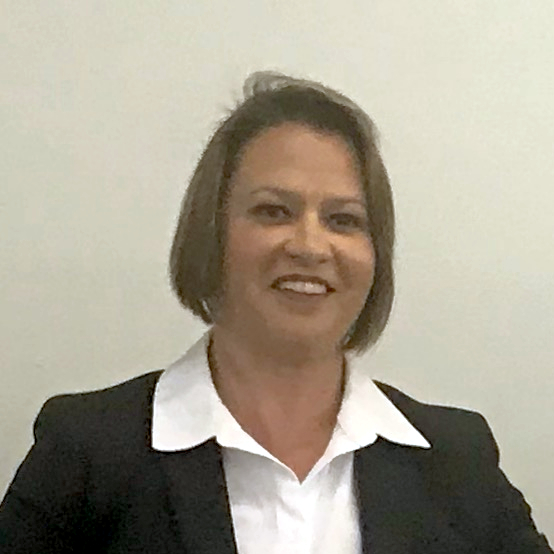

Lieutenant Governor-elect of New Mexico
- Assuming office January 1, 2027
- Governor: Deb Haaland (elect)
- Succeeding: Howie Morales

28th Public Lands Commissioner of New Mexico
- Incumbent
- Assumed office January 1, 2019
- Governor: Michelle Lujan Grisham
- Preceded by: Aubrey Dunn Jr.

Member of the New Mexico House of Representatives from the 43rd district
- In office January 15, 2013 – January 1, 2019
- Preceded by: James Hall
- Succeeded by: Christine Chandler

Personal details
- Born: 1974 or 1975 (age 51–52) Tucumcari, New Mexico, U.S.
- Party: Democratic
- Spouse: Eric Vasquez
- Education: Columbia University (BA); University of California, Los Angeles (GrCert)
- Website: Official website

Stephanie M. Garcia Richard (born 1974/1975) is an American politician who currently serves as the New Mexico Commissioner of Public Lands. Garcia Richard previously served as a member of the New Mexico House of Representatives from January 2013 through December 2018, representing the 43rd district. She chaired the House Education Committee and served on the House Appropriations and Finance Committee and House Labor and Economic Development committee. Garcia Richard was the Democratic Party nominee for Lieutenant Governor of New Mexico in the 2026 election. She won, running with Deb Haaland, and they were the first all woman-of-color ticket for governor and lieutenant governor to be elected in the United States.

== Early life and education ==
Garcia Richard was born in Tucumcari, New Mexico and raised in Silver City. She earned a Bachelor of Arts in political science from Barnard College of Columbia University, and her teaching certificate from UCLA.

== Career ==
Garcia Richard has served in New Mexican politics since her first election 2012.

In March 2025, Garcia Richard announced her bid for Lieutenant Governor of New Mexico and reportedly raised significantly more than her two opponents, Harold Pope Jr. and Maggie Toulouse Oliver, but Richard suspended her campaign in October 2025 after her husband was diagnosed with cancer.

=== New Mexico Commissioner of Public Lands ===
Garcia Richard was elected as New Mexico Commissioner of Public Lands during the 2018 New Mexico elections, and began serving in this position on January 1, 2019. She is the first woman and first Latina to serve in the position. Her deputy for public affairs is Tarin Nix.

=== New Mexico House of Representatives ===
Garcia Richard was first elected to the New Mexico House of Representatives in 2012 for District 43. She represented the district from 2013 through 2018. She served on the Education and Labor and Economic Development committees. During the 2017 and 2018 Legislative Session, She served as chair for the House Education Committee. During her tenure in the House of Representatives, Garcia Richard sponsored 105 bills and acted as co-sponsor for 115 bills.

=== New Mexico lieutenant governor ===
Garcia Richard was the Democratic Party nominee for Lieutenant Governor of New Mexico in the 2026 election. She won, running with Deb Haaland, and they were the first all woman-of-color ticket for governor and lieutenant governor to be elected in the United States.

== Personal life ==
Garcia Richard is married to Eric Vasquez and has two adult children.

== Election history ==
Election history of Stephanie Garcia Richard from 2010.

=== 2018 ===
==== General election ====
Incumbent Land Commissioner Aubrey Dunn Jr. announced that he would not be seeking re-election due to his intention to run for United States Senator. This set forth an open election between State Representative Stephanie Garcia Richard, former Land Commissioner Patrick H. Lyons, and Michael Lucero.

2018 New Mexico elections
Party	Candidate	Votes	%	±%
Democratic	Stephanie Garcia Richard	352,335	51.1	
Republican	Patrick H. Lyons	297,379	43.1	
Libertarian	Michael Lucero	39,791	5.8	
Turnout		689,505		

==== Democratic primary election ====
2018 New Mexico Primary Elections
Party	Candidate	Votes	%	±%
Democratic	Stephanie Garcia Richard	65,601	39.5	
Democratic	Garrett VeneKlasen	61,783	37.2	
Democratic	George Muñoz	38,770	23.3	
Turnout		166,154		

=== 2016 ===
2016 New Mexico Elections
Party	Candidate	Votes	%	±%
Democratic	Stephanie Garcia Richard (Incumbent)	8,452	58.85	
Republican	Sharon Stover	5,910	41.15	
Turnout		14,362		

=== 2014 ===
2014 New Mexico Elections
Party	Candidate	Votes	%	±%
Democratic	Stephanie Garcia Richard (Incumbent)	5,955	56.8	
Republican	Geoff Rodgers	4,522	43.2	
Turnout		10,477		

=== 2012 ===
Long-time incumbent Jeannette Wallace died on April 8, 2011. Jim Hall was appointed by Governor Susana Martinez to fill the open position.

2012 New Mexico Elections
Party	Candidate	Votes	%	±%
Democratic	Stephanie Garcia Richard	7,119	51.2	
Republican	Jim Hall (Incumbent)	6,788	48.8	
Turnout		13,907		

=== 2010 ===
==== General election ====
2010 New Mexico Elections
Party	Candidate	Votes	%	±%
Republican	Jeannette Wallace (Incumbent)	5,550	50.9	
Democratic	Stephanie Garcia Richard	5,360	49.1	
Turnout		10,910		

==== Democratic primary election ====
2010 New Mexico Primary Elections
Party	Candidate	Votes	%	±%
Democratic	Stephanie Garcia Richard	1,299	59.5	
Democratic	Peter Sheehey	882	40.4	
Turnout		2,181		

Party political offices
Preceded by Ray Powell	Democratic nominee for Public Lands Commissioner of New Mexico; 2018, 2022	Succeeded by Juan Sanchez
Preceded by Maggie Toulouse Oliver; Withdrew	Democratic nominee for Lieutenant Governor of New Mexico; 2026	Most recent
Political offices
Preceded by Aubrey Dunn Jr.	Public Lands Commissioner of New Mexico; 2019-present	Incumbent
Preceded by Howie Morales	Lieutenant Governor of New Mexico; Taking office 2027	Elect
