= New Mexico State Treasurer =

U.S. State of New Mexico political office

State Treasurer of New Mexico
- Seal of New Mexico

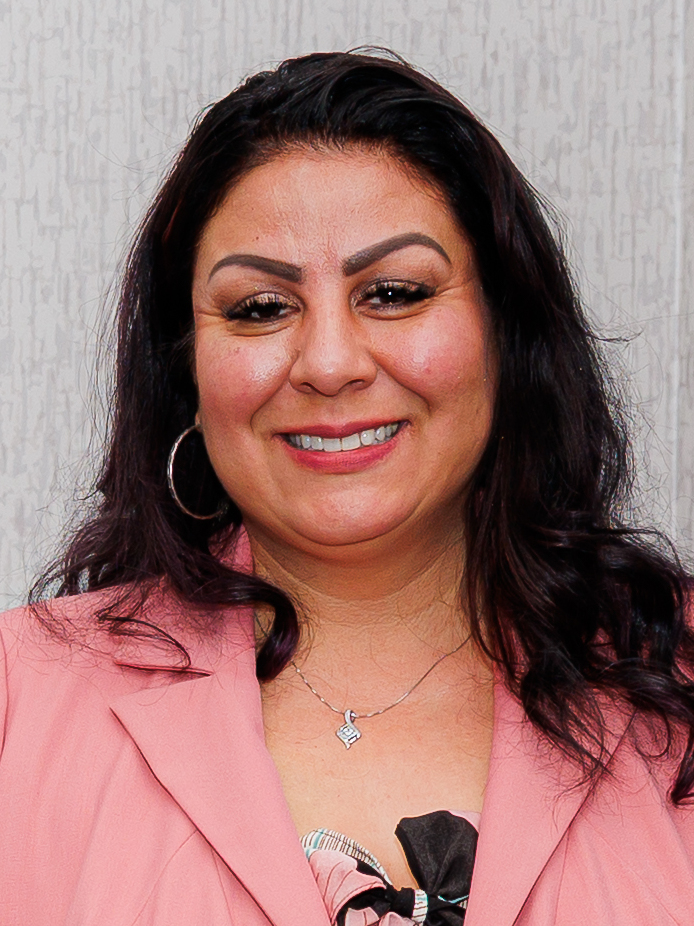
- Incumbent; Laura M. Montoya since January 1, 2023
- Term length: Four years
- Formation: 1912
- First holder: Owen N. Marron
- Website: State Treasurer of New Mexico

The state treasurer of New Mexico is an elected constitutional officer in the executive branch of the U.S. state of New Mexico. Thirty individuals have held the office of state treasurer since statehood. The incumbent is Laura M. Montoya, a Democrat who took office on January 1, 2023, after being elected on November 8, 2022.

== Eligibility and term of office ==
No person may be elected state treasurer other than a United States citizen of at least 30 years of age who has resided continuously in New Mexico for five years preceding the election. The state treasurer is elected to a four-year term and is able to serve up to two consecutive terms; more terms may be served after one full term has intervened.

== Powers and duties ==
The state treasurer is the chief banker and investment officer for the state of New Mexico. As such, the state treasurer receives payments made to the state, deposits sums received with authorized depository institutions, accounts for and manages the state's cash flows, services principal and interest payable on state debt, and disburses public monies in redemption of warrants drawn on state funds. Other programs have been assigned to the state treasurer by law. For example, the state treasurer administers New Mexico's tax-advantaged ABLE and retirement savings programs. Likewise, the state treasurer is responsible for the investment of the state's operating funds and local government investment pool which, at the close of the 2023 fiscal year, totaled approximately $17 billion in terms of assets under management.

Functional responsibilities aside, the state treasurer chairs the State Treasurer's Investment Committee, which prescribes investment policies for the state treasury and evaluates the performance of its portfolio. Likewise, the state treasurer is an ex officio voting member of the following boards and commissions:

1. Capitol Buildings Planning Commission: An intergovernmental agency administratively housed in the State Legislature which is charged with conducting studies and making plans for the long-range facility needs of state government.
2. Educational Retirement Board: An independent agency responsible for managing the pension benefits of both active and retired employees at New Mexican public schools, institutions of higher learning, and certain employees at state agencies who work in educational programs.
3. New Mexico Educational Assistance Foundation: A private nonprofit corporation created by the State Legislature in 1981, the Foundation provides student loans to New Mexicans pursuing a higher education at public universities and community colleges.
4. New Mexico Martin Luther King, Jr. Commission: An independent agency created in 1991 "...to develop, promote, coordinate and review statewide plans and activities for the annual commemoration and celebration of the birthday of Martin Luther King, Jr."
5. New Mexico Mortgage Finance Authority: A self-supporting quasi-governmental entity that provides financing to make quality affordable housing and other related services available to low- and moderate-income New Mexicans.
6. New Mexico Retiree Health Care Authority: An independent agency established in 1990 to provide health care coverage to retirees of state agencies and approximately 300 other eligible participating public entities including cities, counties, universities and charter schools.
7. Public Employees Retirement Association of New Mexico: An independent agency that administers a defined benefit plan for all active and retired public-sector employees, aside from employees of educational service agencies covered by the Educational Retirement Board.
8. Renewable Energy Transmission Authority: A quasi-governmental entity which facilitates the development of electric transmission and storage projects.
9. State Board of Finance: An oversight body housed within New Mexico's Department of Finance and Administration, the State Board of Finance has "...general supervision of the fiscal affairs of the state." To this end, the Board designates depository institutions eligible to safekeep state deposits, authorizes the issuance of state bonds, manages the state debt, approves interfund transfers, and prescribes rules and regulations for keeping cash accounts and remitting state agency receipts to the state treasurer for deposit, among other responsibilities.
10. State Investment Council: An independent agency which directs and administers the investment of New Mexico's four permanent funds: the Land Grant Permanent Fund, the Severance Tax Permanent Fund, the Tobacco Settlement Permanent Fund, and the Water Trust Fund. The State Investment Council is in practice a sovereign wealth fund.

== History of corruption ==
The Office of the State Treasurer has been the subject of multiple corruption scandals in recent decades. In 1975 Treasurer Jesse D. Kornegay pleaded guilty to perjury charges and served time in federal prison. Again in 1985, Treasurer Earl Hartley pleaded guilty to malfeasance in office related to the diversion of funds from a treasurer's conference to his personal account. His deputy, Ken Johnson, was also arrested in December 1984 and pleaded guilty in 1985 to extortion. Hartley resigned from the office in 1985 and was succeeded by James B. Lewis, an appointee of Governor Toney Anaya.

Treasurer David King testified against one of his office's division managers, Joseph O. Garcia, who was charged with bribery of a public official after offering King a bribe for investment activities. Later in 2005, Treasurer Michael A. Montoya pleaded guilty to federal charge of extortion, and in 2007 he also pleaded guilty to a state charge of racketeering. A Democrat, he served four years in prison. Most recently in 2006, Treasurer Robert E. Vigil was convicted of one count of attempted extortion and was acquitted of 23 counts of extortion and racketeering with regard to the investment of state funds. He served time in Federal prison. Robert E. Vigil was a protege of Michael A. Montoya. Robert Vigil resigned in December 2005 and was succeeded by Doug Brown, who was appointed by Governor Bill Richardson.

== List of state treasurers ==
#	Image	Name	Took office	Left office	Party	Years in office
1		Owen N. Marron	1912	1916	Democrat	5 (Note: Since the first state election was in an odd-numbered year (1911), the term lasted five years.)
2		H. L. Hall	1917	1918	Democratic	2
3		Charles U. Strong	1919	1922	Republican	<4 (Note: Resigned on February 11, 1922.)
4		O. A. Matson	1922	1922	Republican	<1 (Note: Appointed by Governor Mechem on May 31, 1922.)
5		John W. Corbin	1923	1923	Democratic	<1 (Note: Tenure in office ended in early 1923.)
6		Warren R. Graham, Sr.	1923	1928	Democratic	<6 (Note: Appointed by Governor Hinkle on May 7, 1923.)
7		Emerson Watts	1929	1930	Republican	2
8		Warren R. Graham, Sr.	1931	1933	Democratic	2 (Note: Died on January 2, 1933.)
9		Clinton P. Anderson	1933	1934	Democratic	2 (Note: Appointed by Governor Seligman on January 7, 1933.)
10		James J. Connelly	1935	1938	Democratic	4
11		Rex French	1939	1942	Democratic	4
12		Guy Shepard	1943	1946	Democratic	4
13		H. R. Rodgers	1947	1950	Democratic	4
14		R. H. Grissom	1951	1954	Democratic	4
15		Joseph B. Grant	1955	1958	Democratic	4
16		Joe Callaway	1959	1962	Democratic	4
17		Joseph B. Grant	1963	1966	Democratic	4
18		H. E. Thomas, Jr.	1967	1967	Republican	<1 (Note: Resigned on December 19, 1967.)
19		Merrill B. Johns, Jr.	1968	1968	Republican	<1 (Note: Appointed by Governor Cargo in January 1968.)
20		Jesse D. Kornegay	1969	1974	Democratic	6
21		Edward M. Murphy	1975	1978	Democratic	4
22		Jan Alan Hartke	1979	1982	Democratic	4
23		Earl E. Hartley	1983	1985	Democratic	<3 (Note: Resigned in December 1985.)
24		James B. Lewis	1986	1990	Democratic	<5 (Note: Appointed by Governor Anaya on December 12, 1985. First African-American elected to a New Mexico state executive office.)
25		David W. King	1991	1994	Democratic	4
26		Michael A. Montoya	1995	2002	Democratic	8
27		Robert E. Vigil	2003	2005	Democratic	<3 (Note: Resigned on October 26, 2005.)
28		Douglas M. Brown	2005	2006	Republican	1 (Note: Appointed by Governor Richardson on November 7, 2005.)
29		James B. Lewis	2006	2014	Democratic	>8 (Note: Took office on December 15, 2006.)
30		Tim Eichenberg	2015	2022	Democratic	8
31		Laura M. Montoya	2023	present	Democratic	
