= Lynn Trujillo =

American lawyer and government official

Senior Counsel to the United States Secretary of the Interior
- In office February 2023 – January 2025
- President: Joe Biden
- Secretary: Deb Haaland

Secretary of the New Mexico Department of Indian Affairs
- In office January 2019 – November 2022
- Succeeded by: James Mountain (nominee)
- Governor: Michelle Lujan Grisham

Personal details
- Education: Dartmouth College; University of New Mexico School of Law

Lynn A. Trujillo is an American lawyer and government official serving as the senior counselor to the United States Secretary of the Interior since February 2023. She is the first Native American woman in the role. Trujillo was the secretary of the New Mexico Department of Indian Affairs from January 2019 to November 2022.

== Life ==
Trujillo is a citizen of the Sandia Pueblo and also associated with the Acoma and Taos Pueblos. She earned a bachelor's degree at Dartmouth College. She earned a University of New Mexico School of Law.

Trujillo worked in tribal law and served as the general counsel of the Sandia Pueblo. She also worked with the Acoma and Taos Pueblos. Trujillo worked as the Native American coordinator for the United States Department of Agriculture's rural development programs. In 2018, she was a lead attorney regarding a lawsuit about how the U.S. Federal Government manages the Indian Health Service, leading to a settlement.

In January 2019, governor Michelle Lujan Grisham nominated Trujillo as the secretary of the New Mexico Department of Indian Affairs. Her appointment was confirmed in a 30-0 vote in February by the New Mexico Senate. In this role, she led the state's first missing and murdered indigenous women and relatives task force. She also collaborated with tribal leadership and legislators to enact legislation increasing funding of school districts in the state's Native American communities. Trujillo stepped down in November 2022. She was succeeded by nominee James Mountain.

In February 2023, Trujillo was appointed by president Joe Biden as the senior counselor to the United States Secretary of the Interior, Deb Haaland. She is the first Native American woman in the role.
