= Laura Montoya (politician) =

American politician

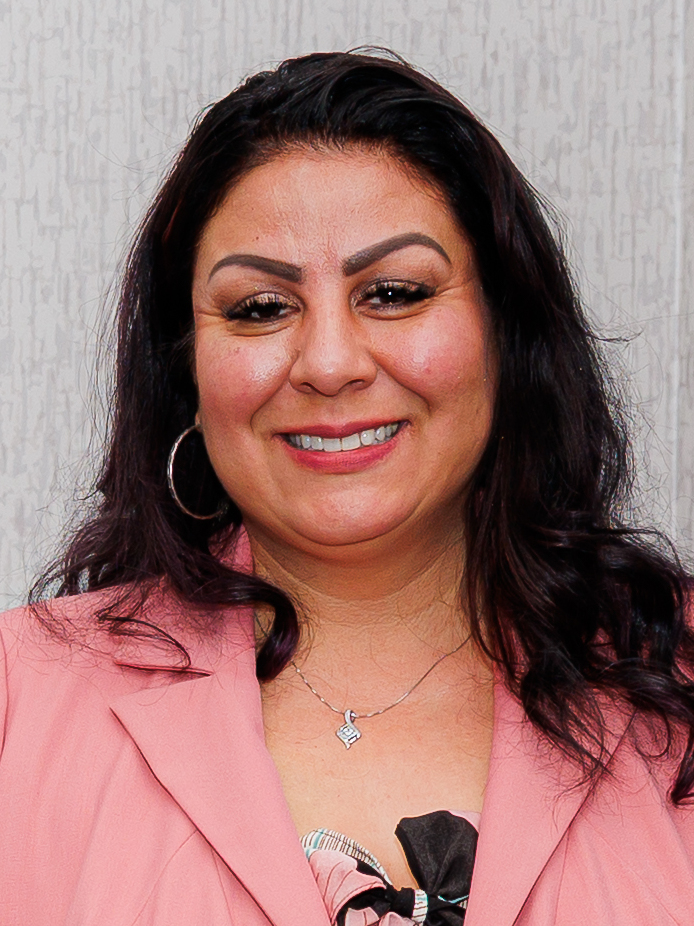
- Montoya in 2025

31st Treasurer of New Mexico
- Incumbent
- Assumed office January 1, 2023
- Governor: Michelle Lujan Grisham; Deb Haaland (elect)
- Preceded by: Tim Eichenberg

Personal details
- Born: 1977 or 1978 (age 48–49) Las Vegas, New Mexico, U.S.
- Party: Democratic
- Education: New Mexico Highlands University (BA, MPA)

Laura M. Montoya (born 1977/1978) is an American politician from New Mexico. A member of the Democratic Party, she is the New Mexico State Treasurer.

== Early life and career ==
Montoya was born in Las Vegas, New Mexico. She lived in both San Miguel and Mora counties while growing up.

Montoya earned a bachelor's degree in political science and psychology from New Mexico Highlands University. She began working in government for state Senator Pete Campos and then worked for U.S. Senator Jeff Bingaman as a constituent services representative. Meanwhile, she earned a Master of Public Affairs from New Mexico Highlands University.

== Political career ==
In 2012, Montoya was elected as the treasurer for Sandoval County, New Mexico. She was reelected in 2016. In July 2019, Montoya entered the 2020 elections for the United States House of Representatives for New Mexico's 3rd congressional district. She lost the Democratic Party nomination to Teresa Leger Fernández.

In August 2021, with Tim Eichenberg, the New Mexico State Treasurer, prevented from running for a third term due to term limits, Montoya announced her candidacy to succeed him in the 2022 election. She faced Heather Benavidez, Eichenberg's chief of staff, in the Democratic primary election. Montoya won the nomination and faced Harry Montoya, a county commissioner from Santa Fe County and the Republican Party nominee, in the general election. She won the election with 53 percent of the vote.

== Personal life ==
Montoya lives in Rio Rancho, New Mexico. In March 2014, she was charged with aggravated battery after allegedly punching and biting her ex-boyfriend that February. She claimed that she acted in self-defense. The case was dismissed in June when her ex-boyfriend did not attend court.

Political offices
Preceded by Tim Eichenberg	Treasurer of New Mexico; 2023–present	Incumbent
