= 2000 United States Senate elections =

- November 7, 2000
- Class 1

34 (Note: 33 Class 1 seats, as well as 1 Class 3 seat in special election) of the 100 seats in the United States Senate 51 (Note: Because the Vice President of the United States has the power to break ties in the Senate, a Senate majority requires either 51 Senate seats without control of the vice presidency or 50 seats with control of the vice presidency.) seats needed for a majority
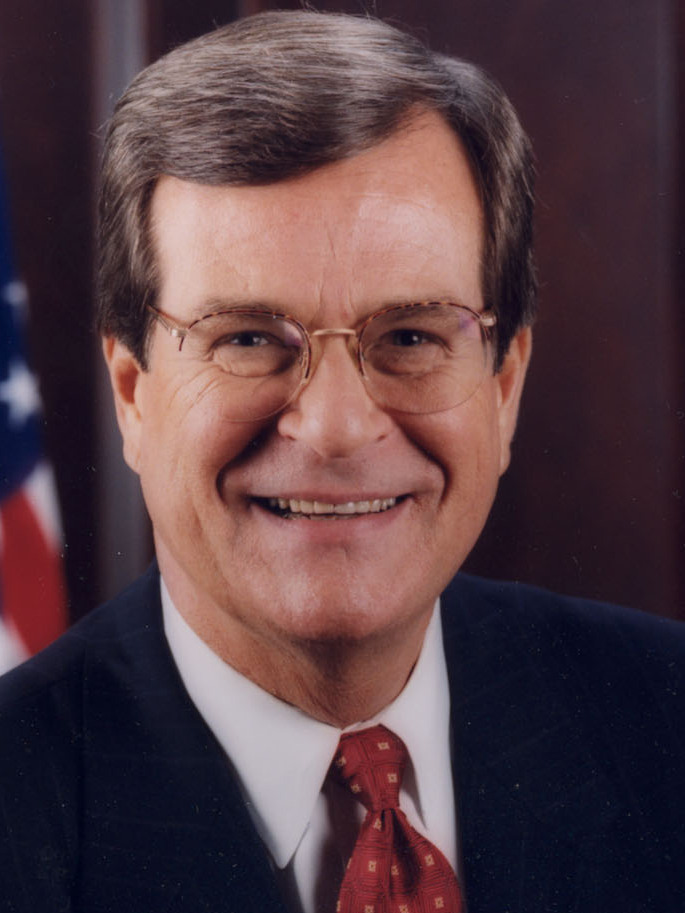

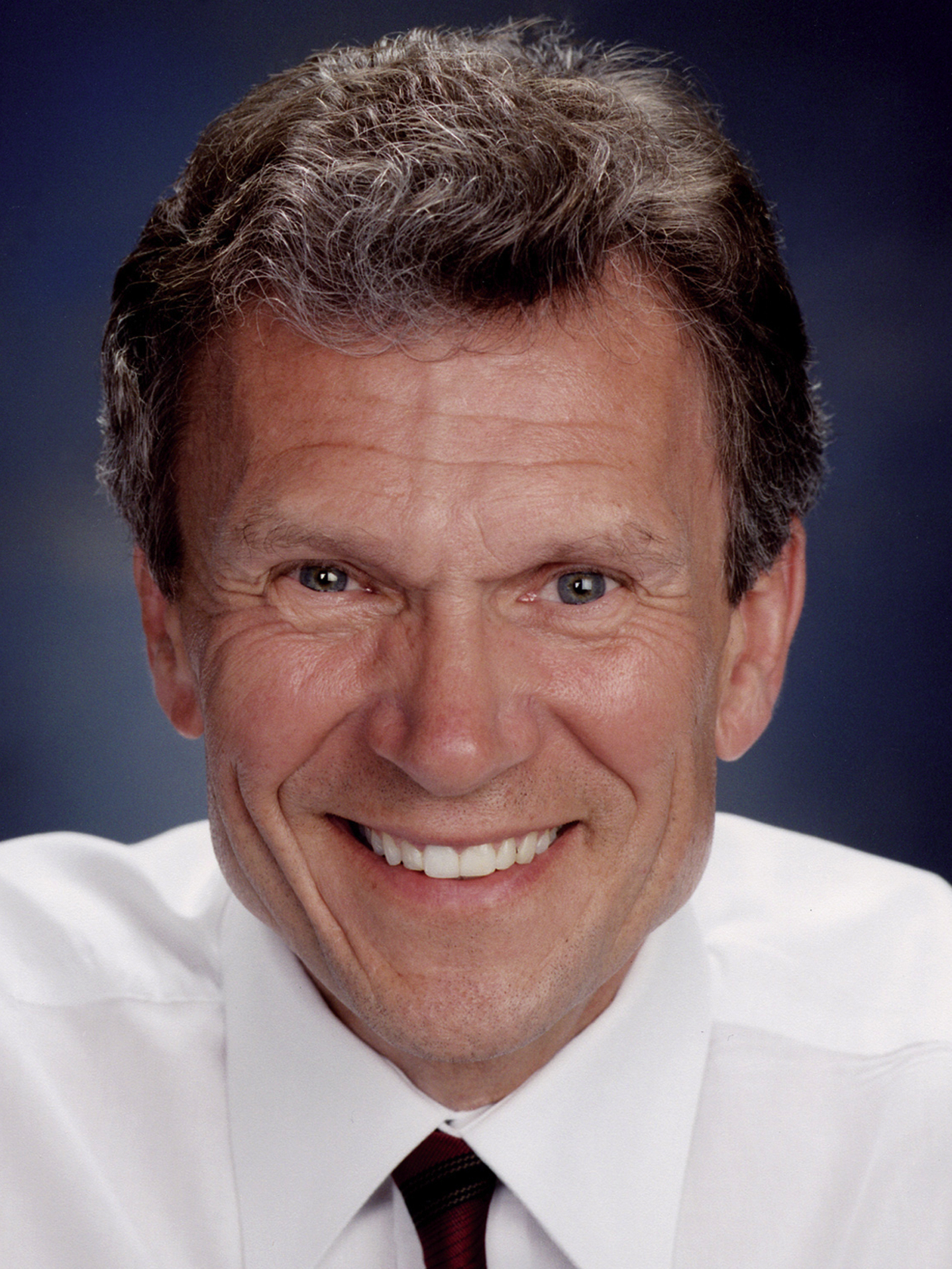
	Majority party	Minority party
Leader	Trent Lott	Tom Daschle
Party	Republican	Democratic
Leader since	June 12, 1996	January 3, 1995
Leader's seat	Mississippi	South Dakota
Seats before	54	46
Seats after	50 + VP (Note: Although these elections yielded a 50—50 tie between the Democratic and Republican caucuses, Republicans briefly took the majority due to their concurrent victory in the presidential election, with Vice President Dick Cheney empowered to act as tie-breaker.)	50
Seat change	▼4	▲4
Popular vote	36,725,431 (Note: Per 21-2-540 (e) of the Georgia Official Code, unless candidates are nominated in a special primary, the special general election ballot remains nonpartisan. The national totals for each of the parties exclude their hypothetical Georgia vote totals.)	36,780,875
Percentage	46.96%	47.04%
Seats up	19	15
Races won	15	19
- Results of the elections: Democratic gain Democratic hold Republican gain Republican hold No election
Majority leader before election
Trent Lott
Republican
Elected Majority leader
Trent Lott (Note: Due to the 50–50 tie between Democrats and Republicans, the vice president casts the tie-breaking vote in organizing the Senate. Because the Clinton administration remained in office until January 20th 2001, Democrats briefly gained control of the Senate from the Republicans for a few weeks, effectively making Tom Daschle majority leader during that time. When the George W. Bush administration assumed office, the Republican Party regained control of the Senate as a result of the 2000 United States presidential election. Later in mid-2001, Vermont senator Jim Jeffords became an independent and caucused with the Democrats, allowing them to again gain control of the Senate with Daschle again becoming the Senate majority leader until early 2003 after Republican won control of the upper chamber in the 2002 United States Senate elections.)
Republican

The 2000 United States Senate elections were held on November 7, 2000. The elections coincided with other federal and state elections, including the presidential election which was won by Republican George W. Bush. These elections took place 6 years after Republicans had won a net gain of eight seats in Senate Class 1. Despite George W. Bush's victory in the presidential election, the Republicans lost four senate seats, the most a winning president's party has lost since the passage of the 17th Amendment in 1913. This election marked the first election year since 1990 where Democrats made net gains in the Senate. Democrats defeated incumbent Republicans in Delaware, Michigan, Minnesota, Missouri, and Washington, and they won an open Republican-held seat in Florida. In Missouri, the winner was elected posthumously. The Republicans defeated Democratic incumbent Chuck Robb in Virginia, and won an open seat in Nevada. Additionally, Republican Senator Paul Coverdell of Georgia died earlier in the year and was replaced by Democratic appointee Zell Miller, who then went on to win the special election.

These elections resulted in an equal 50–50 split between Republicans and Democrats, with the Vice President casting the tie-breaking votes in the Senate. This was the second tied Senate, after the results in the 1880 elections. Democrats thereby technically won control of the Senate briefly from the Republicans but for only 17 days, since Democrat Al Gore was still Vice President and President of the Senate at the beginning of the new congressional term that started on January 3, 2001, and would remain so until the new Republican Vice President and President of the Senate Dick Cheney would be inaugurated on Inauguration Day on January 20, 2001, reestablishing the Republican majority. However, the Republican majority would only last until June 6, 2001, when Liberal Republican Senator Jim Jeffords of Vermont left the Republican Party and became an independent, deciding to caucus with the Democrats, switching control again to the Democrats. Democrats would lose their majority in the Senate again, being reduced to a plurality, after the death of Democratic Minnesota Senator Paul Wellstone, before Republicans would once more and finally regain the majority in the Senate again after Republican Jim Talent won the 2002 United States Senate special election in Missouri, but since the election was held close to the end of the congressional term, Democrats would technically maintain control of the Senate before the new one started. Republicans were able to firmly establish their majority in the 2002 midterm elections, and Democrats would not regain control of the Senate again until the 2006 midterm elections.

Until 2020, this was the last time that Democrats would win a Senate seat in Georgia. This is the last election cycle with only Republicans and Democrats in the Senate, and the last election cycle in which Republicans won seats in Rhode Island and Vermont.

== Results summary ==
↓
50	50
Democratic	Republican

Summary of the 2000 United States Senate election results
Parties	Breakdown			Total seats		Popular vote		Total candidates
Parties	Up	Elected	Not up	2000	+/-	Vote	%	General (Note: Totals do not include participating voters who declined to cast a vote for U.S. Senate. Candidates in the Georgia special election to fill the seat of deceased senator Paul Coverdell were required to be non-partisan. However, Zell Miller and Mack Mattingly were added to the Democratic and Republican columns respectively and all the other candidates were added to the Independent column.)
Democratic Party	15	19	31	50	▲4	36,780,875	47.039%	33
Republican Party	19	15	35	50	▼4	36,725,431	46.968%	34
Libertarian Party	-	-	-	-	-	1,036,684	1.326%	22
Green Party	-	-	-	-	-	652,329	0.834%	8
Independent	-	-	-	-	-	365,614	0.468%	24
Constitution Party	-	-	-	-	-	286,816	0.367%	8
Reform Party	-	-	-	-	-	190,509	0.244%	8
Independence Party	-	-	-	-	-	183,764	0.235%	2
Socialist Workers Party	-	-	-	-	-	15,996	0.020%	2
Other parties	-	-	-	-	-	1,461,975	1.870%	12
Write-in	-	-	-	-	-	324,295	0.415%	-
Total	34	34	66	100	-	78,191,797	100.0%	153

Source: Clerk of the House of Representatives (June 21, 2001). "Statistics of the Presidential and Congressional Election of November 7, 2000" – via House.gov.

== Change in composition ==
=== Before the elections ===
After the July 27, 2000, appointment in Georgia.

D_{1}	D_{2}	D_{3}	D_{4}	D_{5}	D_{6}	D_{7}	D_{8}	D_{9}	D_{10}
D_{20}	D_{19}	D_{18}	D_{17}	D_{16}	D_{15}	D_{14}	D_{13}	D_{12}	D_{11}
D_{21}	D_{22}	D_{23}	D_{24}	D_{25}	D_{26}	D_{27}	D_{28}	D_{29}	D_{30}
D_{40} Va. Ran	D_{39} N.D. Ran	D_{38} N.M. Ran	D_{37} Mass. Ran	D_{36} Md. Ran	D_{35} Hawaii; Ran	D_{34} Ga. (sp); Ran	D_{33} Conn. Ran	D_{32} Calif. Ran	D_{31}
D_{41} W.Va. Ran	D_{42} Wis. Ran	D_{43} Neb. Retired	D_{44} Nev. Retired	D_{45} N.J. Retired	D_{46} N.Y. Retired	R_{54} Fla. Retired	R_{53} Wyo. Ran	R_{52} Wash. Ran	R_{51} Vt. Ran
Majority →									R_{51} Vt. Ran
R_{41} Minn. Ran	R_{42} Miss. Ran	R_{43} Mo. Ran	R_{44} Mont. Ran	R_{45} Ohio; Ran	R_{46} Pa. Ran	R_{47} R.I. Ran	R_{48} Tenn. Ran	R_{49} Texas; Ran	R_{50} Utah; Ran
R_{40} Mich. Ran	R_{39} Maine; Ran	R_{38} Ind. Ran	R_{37} Del. Ran	R_{36} Ariz. Ran	R_{35}	R_{34}	R_{33}	R_{32}	R_{31}
R_{21}	R_{22}	R_{23}	R_{24}	R_{25}	R_{26}	R_{27}	R_{28}	R_{29}	R_{30}
R_{20}	R_{19}	R_{18}	R_{17}	R_{16}	R_{15}	R_{14}	R_{13}	R_{12}	R_{11}
R_{1}	R_{2}	R_{3}	R_{4}	R_{5}	R_{6}	R_{7}	R_{8}	R_{9}	R_{10}

=== After the elections ===
D_{1}	D_{2}	D_{3}	D_{4}	D_{5}	D_{6}	D_{7}	D_{8}	D_{9}	D_{10}
D_{20}	D_{19}	D_{18}	D_{17}	D_{16}	D_{15}	D_{14}	D_{13}	D_{12}	D_{11}
D_{21}	D_{22}	D_{23}	D_{24}	D_{25}	D_{26}	D_{27}	D_{28}	D_{29}	D_{30}
D_{40} N.M. Re-elected	D_{39} N.J. Hold	D_{38} Neb. Hold	D_{37} Mass. Re-elected	D_{36} Md. Re-elected	D_{35} Hawaii; Re-elected	D_{34} Ga. (sp); Elected (Note: Appointee elected.)	D_{33} Conn. Re-elected	D_{32} Calif. Re-elected	D_{31}
D_{41} N.Y. Hold	D_{42} N.D. Re-elected	D_{43} W.Va. Re-elected	D_{44} Wis. Re-elected	D_{45} Del. Gain	D_{46} Fla. Gain	D_{47} Mich. Gain	D_{48} Minn. Gain	D_{49} Mo. Gain (Note: Mel Carnahan, the Democrat Senator-elect as a result of the November election, died on October 16; Democrat Jean Carnahan was appointed in his place and seated at the beginning of the 107th United States Congress on January 3, 2001.)	D_{50} Wash. Gain
Majority (with Democratic vice president) ↑									D_{50} Wash. Gain
R_{41} Ohio; Re-elected	R_{42} Pa. Re-elected	R_{43} R.I. Elected	R_{44} Tenn. Re-elected	R_{45} Texas; Re-elected	R_{46} Utah; Re-elected	R_{47} Vt. Re-elected	R_{48} Wyo. Re-elected	R_{49} Nev. Gain	R_{50} Va. Gain
R_{40} Mont. Re-elected	R_{39} Miss. Re-elected	R_{38} Maine; Re-elected	R_{37} Ind. Re-elected	R_{36} Ariz. Re-elected	R_{35}	R_{34}	R_{33}	R_{32}	R_{31}
R_{21}	R_{22}	R_{23}	R_{24}	R_{25}	R_{26}	R_{27}	R_{28}	R_{29}	R_{30}
R_{20}	R_{19}	R_{18}	R_{17}	R_{16}	R_{15}	R_{14}	R_{13}	R_{12}	R_{11}
R_{1}	R_{2}	R_{3}	R_{4}	R_{5}	R_{6}	R_{7}	R_{8}	R_{9}	R_{10}

=== Beginning of the first session ===
D_{1}	D_{2}	D_{3}	D_{4}	D_{5}	D_{6}	D_{7}	D_{8}	D_{9}	D_{10}
D_{20}	D_{19}	D_{18}	D_{17}	D_{16}	D_{15}	D_{14}	D_{13}	D_{12}	D_{11}
D_{21}	D_{22}	D_{23}	D_{24}	D_{25}	D_{26}	D_{27}	D_{28}	D_{29}	D_{30}
D_{40}	D_{39}	D_{38}	D_{37}	D_{36}	D_{35}	D_{34}	D_{33}	D_{32}	D_{31}
D_{41}	D_{42}	D_{43}	D_{44}	D_{45}	D_{46}	D_{47}	D_{48}	D_{49}	D_{50}
Majority (with Independent in caucus) ↑									D_{50}
R_{41}	R_{42}	R_{43}	R_{44}	R_{45}	R_{46}	R_{47}	R_{48}	R_{49}	I_{1} Vt. Changed
R_{40}	R_{39}	R_{38}	R_{37}	R_{36}	R_{35}	R_{34}	R_{33}	R_{32}	R_{31}
R_{21}	R_{22}	R_{23}	R_{24}	R_{25}	R_{26}	R_{27}	R_{28}	R_{29}	R_{30}
R_{20}	R_{19}	R_{18}	R_{17}	R_{16}	R_{15}	R_{14}	R_{13}	R_{12}	R_{11}
R_{1}	R_{2}	R_{3}	R_{4}	R_{5}	R_{6}	R_{7}	R_{8}	R_{9}	R_{10}

Key:

D_{#}	Democratic
I_{#}	Independent, caucusing with Democrats
R_{#}	Republican

== Gains and losses ==
=== Retirements ===
Map of retirements: Republican incumbent Democratic incumbent Democratic incumbent retired Republican incumbent retired

One Republican and four Democrats retired instead of seeking re-election. John Chafee of Rhode Island had previously announced his intent to retire at the end of his term, however, he died in office on October 24, 1999.

State	Senator	Age at end of term	Assumed office	Replaced by
Florida	Connie Mack III	60	1989	Bill Nelson
Nebraska	Bob Kerrey	57	1989	Ben Nelson
Nevada	Richard Bryan	63	1989	John Ensign
New Jersey	Frank Lautenberg	76	1982	Jon Corzine
New York	Daniel Patrick Moynihan	73	1977	Hillary Clinton

=== Defeats ===
One Democrat and five Republicans sought re-election but lost in the general election.

State	Senator	Age at end of term	Assumed office	Replaced by
Delaware	William Roth	79	1971	Tom Carper
Michigan	Spencer Abraham	48	1995	Debbie Stabenow
Minnesota	Rod Grams	52	1995	Mark Dayton
Missouri	John Ashcroft	58	1995	Mel Carnahan †
Virginia	Chuck Robb	61	1989	George Allen
Washington	Slade Gorton	72	1989 (Note: Gorton previously served as a Senator from 1981 to 1987.)	Maria Cantwell

=== Post-election changes ===
One Democratic senator-elect died on October 16, 2000, having been elected posthumously, and was replaced by a Democrat. In Minnesota, a regular scheduled election was held in the 2002 senate elections for the Class 2 term, where Norm Coleman won the election to succeed IPM appointee Dean Barkley, who was not a candidate for the next term. In Texas, a regular scheduled election was also held in the 2002 Senate elections for the Class 2 term, where John Cornyn won the election to succeed Republican incumbent Phil Gramm, who did not seek re-election.

State	Senator	Replaced by
Missouri (Class 1)	Mel Carnahan (Note: Senator-elect)	Jean Carnahan
Minnesota (Class 2)	Paul Wellstone	Dean Barkley
Texas (Class 2)	Phil Gramm	John Cornyn

== Race summary ==
=== Special elections during the previous Congress ===
In this special election, the winner was seated between January 1, 2000, and January 2, 2001.

State	Incumbent			Result	Candidates
State	Senator	Party	Electoral history	Result	Candidates
Georgia (Class 3)	Zell Miller	Democratic	2000 (appointed)	Interim appointee elected November 7, 2000.	▌ ✓ Zell Miller (Democratic) 58.2%; ▌Mack Mattingly (Republican) 37.9%

=== Elections to the next Congress ===
In these general elections, the winners were elected for the term beginning January 3, 2001.

All of the elections involved the Class 1 seats.

State	Incumbent			Result	Candidates
State	Senator	Party	Electoral history	Result	Candidates
Arizona	Jon Kyl	Republican	1994	Incumbent re-elected.	▌ ✓ Jon Kyl (Republican) 79.3%; ▌William Toel (Independent) 7.8%; ▌Vance Hansen (Green) 7.8%; ▌Barry Hess (Libertarian) 5.1%
California	Dianne Feinstein	Democratic	1992 (special); 1994	Incumbent re-elected.	▌ ✓ Dianne Feinstein (Democratic) 55.8%; ▌Tom Campbell (Republican) 36.6%; ▌Medea Benjamin (Green) 3.1%; Others: ▌Gail Lightfoot (Libertarian) 1.8%; ▌Diane Beall Templin (American Ind.) 1.3%; ▌Jose Camahort (Reform) 0.9%; ▌Brian M. Rees (Natural Law) 0.6%
Connecticut	Joe Lieberman	Democratic	1988; 1994	Incumbent re-elected.	▌ ✓ Joe Lieberman (Democratic) 63.2%; ▌Philip Giordano (Republican) 34.1%; Others: ▌William Kozak (Concerned Citizens) 2.0%; ▌Wildey J. Moore (Libertarian) 0.7%
Delaware	William Roth	Republican	1970; 1971 (appointed); 1976; 1982; 1988; 1994	Incumbent lost re-election. Democratic gain.	▌ ✓ Tom Carper (Democratic) 55.5%; ▌William Roth (Republican) 43.7%; Others: ▌Mark Dankof (Constitution) 0.3%; ▌J. Burke Morrison (Libertarian) 0.3%; ▌Robert Mattson (Natural Law) 0.2%
Florida	Connie Mack III	Republican	1988; 1994	Incumbent retired. Democratic gain.	▌ ✓ Bill Nelson (Democratic) 51.0%; ▌Bill McCollum (Republican) 46.2%; Others: ▌Willie Logan (Independent) 1.4%; ▌Joe Simonetta (Natural Law) 0.4%; ▌Darrell L. McCormick (Independent) 0.4%; ▌Joel Deckard (Reform) 0.3%; ▌Andy Martin (Independent) 0.3%; ▌Nikki Oldaker (Independent) 0.1%
Hawaii	Daniel Akaka	Democratic	1990 (appointed); 1990 (special); 1994	Incumbent re-elected.	▌ ✓ Daniel Akaka (Democratic) 72.7%; ▌John Carroll (Republican) 24.5%; Others: ▌Lauri Clegg (Natural Law) 1.2%; ▌Lloyd Jeffrey Mallan (Libertarian) 0.9%; ▌David Porter (Constitution) 0.7%
Indiana	Richard Lugar	Republican	1976; 1982; 1988; 1994	Incumbent re-elected.	▌ ✓ Richard Lugar (Republican) 66.5%; ▌David Johnson (Democratic) 31.9%; ▌Paul Hager (Libertarian) 1.6%
Maine	Olympia Snowe	Republican	1994	Incumbent re-elected.	▌ ✓ Olympia Snowe (Republican) 68.9%; ▌Mark Lawrence (Democratic) 31.1%
Maryland	Paul Sarbanes	Democratic	1976; 1982; 1988; 1994	Incumbent re-elected.	▌ ✓ Paul Sarbanes (Democratic) 63.2%; ▌Paul Rappaport (Republican) 36.7%
Massachusetts	Ted Kennedy	Democratic	1962 (special); 1964; 1970; 1976; 1982; 1988; 1994	Incumbent re-elected.	▌ ✓ Ted Kennedy (Democratic) 72.9%; ▌Jack E. Robinson III (Republican) 12.9%; ▌Carla Howell (Libertarian) 11.9%; Others: ▌Philip F. Lawler (Constitution) 1.6%; ▌Dale Friedgen (Independent) 0.5%
Michigan	Spencer Abraham	Republican	1994	Incumbent lost re-election. Democratic gain.	▌ ✓ Debbie Stabenow (Democratic) 49.4%; ▌Spencer Abraham (Republican) 47.9%; Others: ▌Matthew Abel (Green) 0.9%; ▌Michael Corliss (Libertarian) 0.7%; ▌Mark Forton (Reform) 0.6%; ▌John Mangopoulos (U.S. Taxpayers) 0.3%; ▌William Quarton (Natural Law) 0.1%
Minnesota	Rod Grams	Republican	1994	Incumbent lost re-election. DFL gain.	▌ ✓ Mark Dayton (DFL) 48.8%; ▌Rod Grams (Republican) 43.3%; ▌James Gibson (Independence) 5.8%; Others: ▌David Daniels (Grassroots) 0.9%; ▌Rebecca Ellis (Socialist Workers) 0.5%; ▌David Swan (Constitution) 0.4%; ▌Erik D. Pakieser (Libertarian) 0.3%
Mississippi	Trent Lott	Republican	1988; 1994	Incumbent re-elected.	▌ ✓ Trent Lott (Republican) 65.9%; ▌Troy Brown (Democratic) 31.6%; Others: ▌Jim Giles (Independent) 0.9%; ▌Lewis Napper (Libertarian) 0.9%; ▌Shawn O'Hara (Reform) 0.7%
Missouri	John Ashcroft	Republican	1994	Incumbent lost re-election. New senator elected posthumously. Democratic gain. Carnahan's widow, Jean Carnahan, was appointed to begin the next term.	▌ ✓ Mel Carnahan † (Democratic) 50.4%; ▌John Ashcroft (Republican) 48.4%; Others: ▌Evaline Taylor (Green) 0.5%; ▌Grant Samuel Stauffer (Libertarian) 0.4%; ▌Hugh Foley (Reform) 0.2%; ▌Charles Dockins (Natural Law) 0.1%
Montana	Conrad Burns	Republican	1988; 1994	Incumbent re-elected.	▌ ✓ Conrad Burns (Republican) 50.6%; ▌Brian Schweitzer (Democratic) 47.2%; ▌Gary Lee (Reform) 2.2%
Nebraska	Bob Kerrey	Democratic	1988; 1994	Incumbent retired. Democratic hold.	▌ ✓ Ben Nelson (Democratic) 51%; ▌Don Stenberg (Republican) 48.8%
Nevada	Richard Bryan	Democratic	1988; 1994	Incumbent retired. Republican gain.	▌ ✓ John Ensign (Republican) 55.1%; ▌Ed Bernstein (Democratic) 39.7%; Others: None of These Candidates 1.9%; ▌Kathy Rusco (Green) 1.7%; ▌J. J. Johnson (Libertarian) 0.9%; ▌Ernie Berghof (Independent American) 0.4%; ▌Bill Grutzmacher (Citizens First) 0.3%
New Jersey	Frank Lautenberg	Democratic	1982; 1982 (appointed); 1988; 1994	Incumbent retired. Democratic hold.	▌ ✓ Jon Corzine (Democratic) 50.1%; ▌Bob Franks (Republican) 47.1%; Others: ▌Bruce Afran (Green) 1.1%; ▌Pat DiNizio (Reform) 0.6%; ▌Emerson Ellett (Libertarian) 0.2%; ▌Dennis A. Breen (Independent) 0.2%; ▌J. M. Carter (Trust in God) 0.2%; ▌Lorraine LaNeve (NJ Conservative) 0.1%; ▌Gregory Pason (Socialist) 0.1%; ▌Nancy Rosenstock (Socialist Workers) 0.1%; ▌George Gostigian (God Bless Jersey) 0.1%
New Mexico	Jeff Bingaman	Democratic	1982; 1988; 1994	Incumbent re-elected.	▌ ✓ Jeff Bingaman (Democratic) 61.7%; ▌Bill Redmond (Republican) 38.3%
New York	Daniel Patrick Moynihan	Democratic	1976; 1982; 1988; 1994	Incumbent retired. Democratic hold.	▌ ✓ Hillary Clinton (Democratic) 55.3%; ▌Rick Lazio (Republican) 43.0%; Others: ▌Jeffrey E. Graham (Independence) 0.6%; ▌Mark J. Dunau (Green) 0.6%; ▌John O. Adefope (Right to Life) 0.3%; ▌John Clifton (Libertarian) 0.1%; ▌Louis Wein (Constitution) 0.1%; ▌Jacob Perasso (Socialist Workers) 0.1%
North Dakota	Kent Conrad	Democratic-NPL	1986; 1992 (retired); 1992 (special); 1994	Incumbent re-elected.	▌ ✓ Kent Conrad (Democratic-NPL) 61.4%; ▌Duane Sand (Republican) 38.6%
Ohio	Mike DeWine	Republican	1994	Incumbent re-elected.	▌ ✓ Mike DeWine (Republican) 59.9%; ▌Ted Celeste (Democratic) 35.9%; ▌John McAlister (Libertarian) 2.6%; ▌John Eastman (Natural Law) 1.6%
Pennsylvania	Rick Santorum	Republican	1994	Incumbent re-elected.	▌ ✓ Rick Santorum (Republican) 52.4%; ▌Ron Klink (Democratic) 45.5%; Others: ▌John Featherman (Libertarian) 1.0%; ▌Lester Searer (Constitution) 0.6%; ▌Robert Domske (Reform) 0.5%
Rhode Island	Lincoln Chafee	Republican	1999 (appointed)	Interim appointee elected.	▌ ✓ Lincoln Chafee (Republican) 56.8%; ▌Robert Weygand (Democratic) 41.1%; Others: ▌Christopher Young (Reform) 1.0%; ▌Kenneth Proulx (Independent) 0.9%
Tennessee	Bill Frist	Republican	1994	Incumbent re-elected.	▌ ✓ Bill Frist (Republican) 65.1%; ▌Jeff Clark (Democratic) 32.2%; Others: ▌Tom Burrell (Green) 1.3%; ▌Charles F. Johnson (Independent) 0.5%; ▌Robert Watson (Independent) 0.4%; ▌David Jarrod Ownby (Independent) 0.2%; ▌Joel Kinstle (Independent) 0.2%
Texas	Kay Bailey Hutchison	Republican	1993 (special); 1994	Incumbent re-elected.	▌ ✓ Kay Bailey Hutchison (Republican) 65%; ▌Gene Kelly (Democratic) 32.3%; Others: ▌Doug Sandage (Green) 1.5%; ▌Mary Ruwart (Libertarian) 1.1%
Utah	Orrin Hatch	Republican	1976; 1982; 1988; 1994	Incumbent re-elected.	▌ ✓ Orrin Hatch (Republican) 65.6%; ▌Scott Howell (Democratic) 31.5%; Others: ▌Carlton Edward Bowen (Ind. American) 1.6%; ▌Jim Dexter (Libertarian) 1.4%
Vermont	Jim Jeffords	Republican	1988; 1994	Incumbent re-elected.	▌ ✓ Jim Jeffords (Republican) 65.6%; ▌Ed Flanagan (Democratic) 25.4%; ▌Charles W. Russell (Constitution) 3.5%; Others: ▌Rick Hubbard (Independent) 1.9%; ▌Billy Greer (Vermont Grassroots) 1.7%; ▌Hugh Douglas (Libertarian) 1.3%; ▌Jerry Levy (Liberty Union) 0.5%
Virginia	Chuck Robb	Democratic	1988; 1994	Incumbent lost re-election. Republican gain.	▌ ✓ George Allen (Republican) 52.3%; ▌Chuck Robb (Democratic) 47.7%
Washington	Slade Gorton	Republican	1980; 1986 (lost); 1988; 1994	Incumbent lost re-election. Democratic gain.	▌ ✓ Maria Cantwell (Democratic) 48.7%; ▌Slade Gorton (Republican) 48.6%; ▌Jeff Jared (Libertarian) 2.6%
West Virginia	Robert Byrd	Democratic	1958; 1964; 1970; 1976; 1982; 1988; 1994	Incumbent re-elected.	▌ ✓ Robert Byrd (Democratic) 77.7%; ▌David T. Gallaher (Republican) 20.2%; ▌Joe Whelan (Libertarian) 2.1%
Wisconsin	Herb Kohl	Democratic	1988; 1994	Incumbent re-elected.	▌ ✓ Herb Kohl (Democratic) 61.5%; ▌John Gillespie (Republican) 37.0%; Others: ▌Tim Peterson (Libertarian) 0.8%; ▌Eugene A. Hem (Independent) 0.4%; ▌Robert R. Raymond (Constitution) 0.2%
Wyoming	Craig L. Thomas	Republican	1994	Incumbent re-elected.	▌ ✓ Craig L. Thomas (Republican) 73.7%; ▌Mel Logan (Democratic) 22%; ▌Margaret Dawson (Libertarian) 4.2%

== Closest races ==
In ten races the margin of victory was under 10%

District	Winner	Margin
Washington	Democratic (flip)	0.09%
Michigan	Democratic (flip)	1.6%
Missouri	Democratic (flip)	2.1%
Nebraska	Democratic	2.3%
New Jersey	Democratic	3.0%
Montana	Republican	3.4% (Note: Montana was the "tipping-point state".)
Virginia	Republican (flip)	4.6%
Florida	Democratic (flip)	4.8%
Minnesota	Democratic (flip)	5.5%
Pennsylvania	Republican	6.9%

== Arizona ==
Arizona election
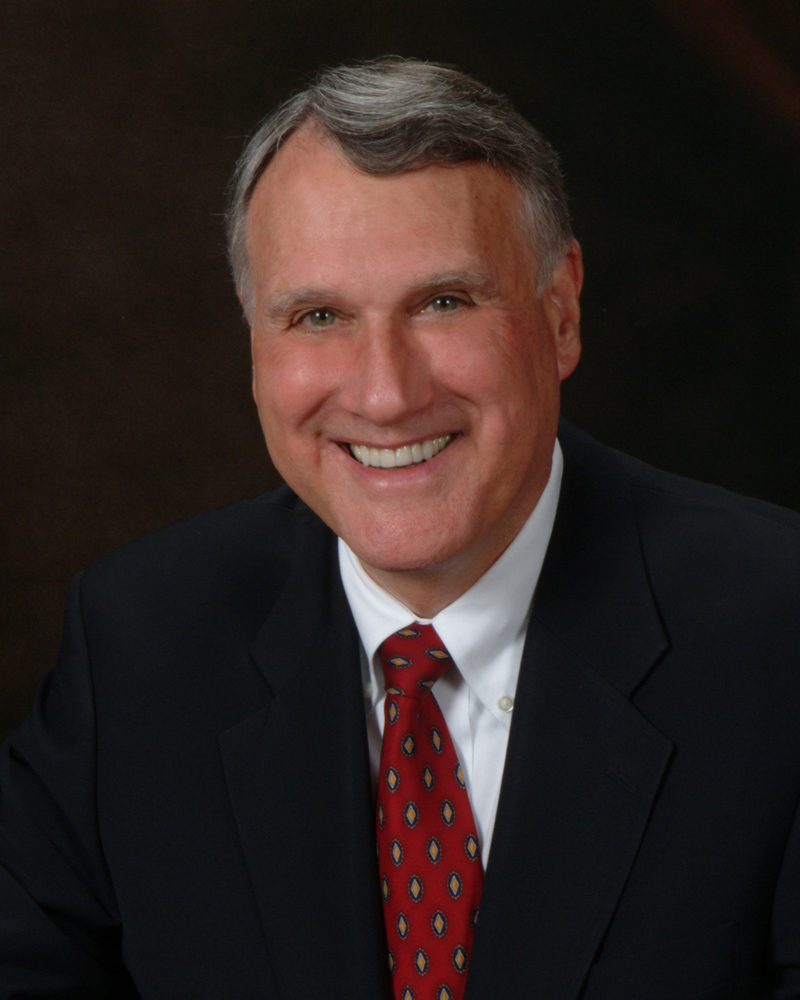

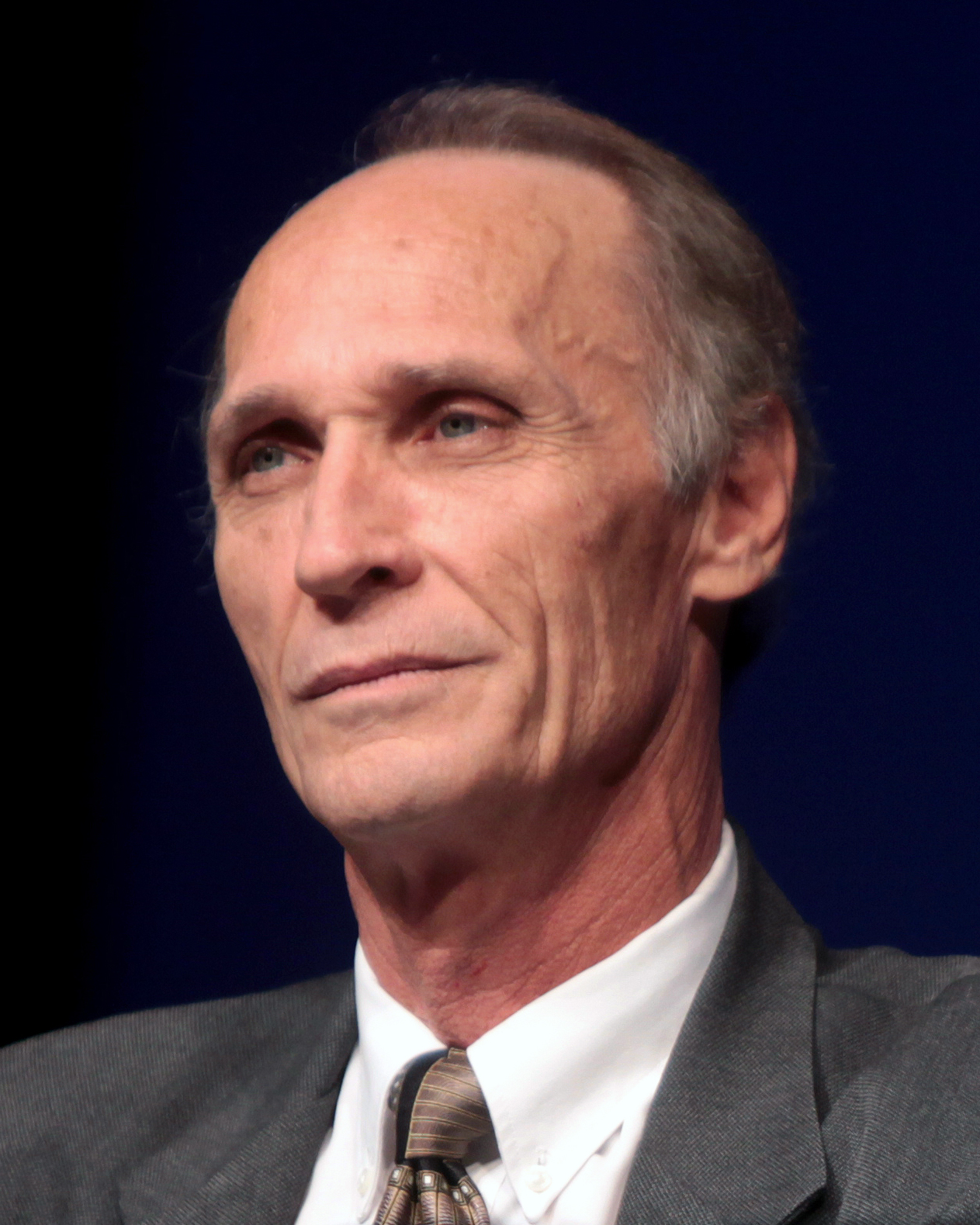
Nominee	Jon Kyl	William Toel
Party	Republican	Independent
Popular vote	1,101,196	109,230
Percentage	79.3%	7.8%
Nominee	Vance Hansen	Barry Hess
Party	Green	Libertarian
Popular vote	108,926	70,724
Percentage	7.8%	5.1%
- County results Kyl: 60–70% 70–80% 80–90%
U.S. senator before election
Jon Kyl
Republican
Elected U.S. senator
Jon Kyl
Republican

Incumbent Republican Jon Kyl won re-election to a second term, as no candidate was nominated from the Democratic Party. Independent Bill Toel, Green party nominee Vance Hansen, and Libertarian party nominee Barry Hess each got more than 5% of the vote, a strong third party performance.

General election
Party	Candidate	Votes	%	±%
Republican	Jon Kyl (Incumbent)	1,108,196	79.32	+25.62%
Independent	William Toel	109,230	7.82	
Green	Vance Hansen	108,926	7.80	
Libertarian	Barry Hess	70,724	5.06	−1.68%
Majority		998,966	71.50	+57.34%
Turnout		1,397,076		
Republican hold		Swing		

== California ==
California election
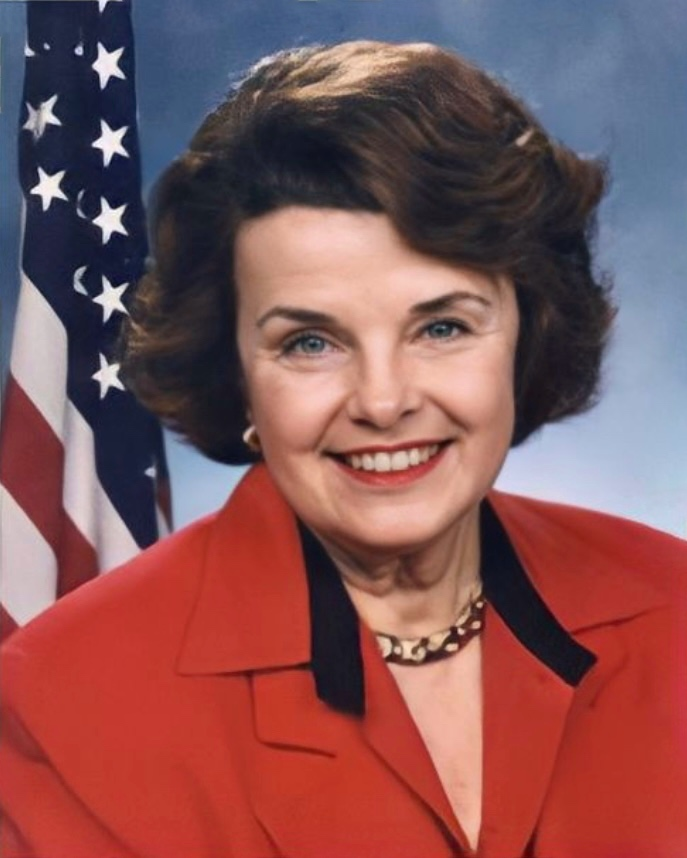

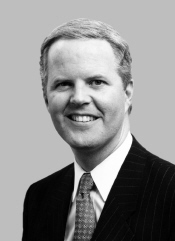
Nominee	Dianne Feinstein	Tom Campbell
Party	Democratic	Republican
Popular vote	5,932,522	3,886,853
Percentage	55.84%	36.59%
- County results Feinstein: 40–50% 50–60% 60–70% 70–80% Campbell: 40–50% 50–60% 60–70%
U.S. senator before election
Dianne Feinstein
Democratic
Elected U.S. senator
Dianne Feinstein
Democratic

The heavily financed and popular senator Dianne Feinstein (D) easily won re-election to her second full term defeating the underfunded and underdog candidate Representative Tom Campbell (R) by over 19 points. Campbell even lost his own congressional district by almost 15 points.

Primary election results:

2000 U.S. Senate Democratic Party primary in California
Candidate	Votes	%
Dianne Feinstein	3,759,560	95.50
Michael Schmier	181,104	4.50
Total votes	3,940,664	100.00

2000 U.S. Senate Republican Party primary in California
Candidate	Votes	%
Tom Campbell	1,697,208	56.17
Ray Haynes	679,034	22.47
Bill Horn	453,630	15.01
John M. Brown	68,415	2.26
Linh Dao	64,559	2.14
James Peter Gough	58,853	1.95
Total votes	3,021,699	100.00

2000 U.S. Senate Green Party primary in California
Candidate	Votes	%
Medea Benjamin	99,716	73.95
Jan B. Tucker	35,124	26.05
Total votes	134,840	100.00

2000 U.S. Senate Reform Party primary in California
Candidate	Votes	%
Jose Luis Olivares Camahort	46,278	70.34
Valli "Sharp" Sharpe	19,516	29.66
Total votes	65,794	100.00

2000 U.S. Senate other primaries in California
Party	Candidate	Votes	%
Libertarian	Gail Lightfoot	120,622	100.00
American Independent	Diane Beall Templin	38,836	100.00
Natural Law	Brian M. Rees	26,382	100.00

Despite touting his service as a moderate Republican representing a strongly Democratic district, Campbell was underfunded and a decided underdog against the popular, heavily financed Feinstein. By February, he spent barely $1 million without any PAC money. Campbell has generally supported gay rights and abortion. He also opposes the war on drugs and calls himself a "maverick", similar to U.S. senator John McCain. Campbell was badly defeated, losing by over 19 points.

2000 U.S. Senate election, California
Party	Candidate	Votes	%
Democratic	Dianne Feinstein (Incumbent)	5,932,522	55.84
Republican	Tom Campbell	3,886,853	36.59
Green	Medea Susan Benjamin	326,828	3.08
Libertarian	Gail Lightfoot	187,718	1.77
American Independent	Diane Beall Templin	134,598	1.27
Reform	Jose Luis Olivares Camahort	96,552	0.91
Natural Law	Brian M. Rees	58,537	0.55
Invalid or blank votes		519,233	4.66
Total votes		11,142,841	100.00
Turnout			51.92
Democratic hold			

== Connecticut ==
Connecticut election
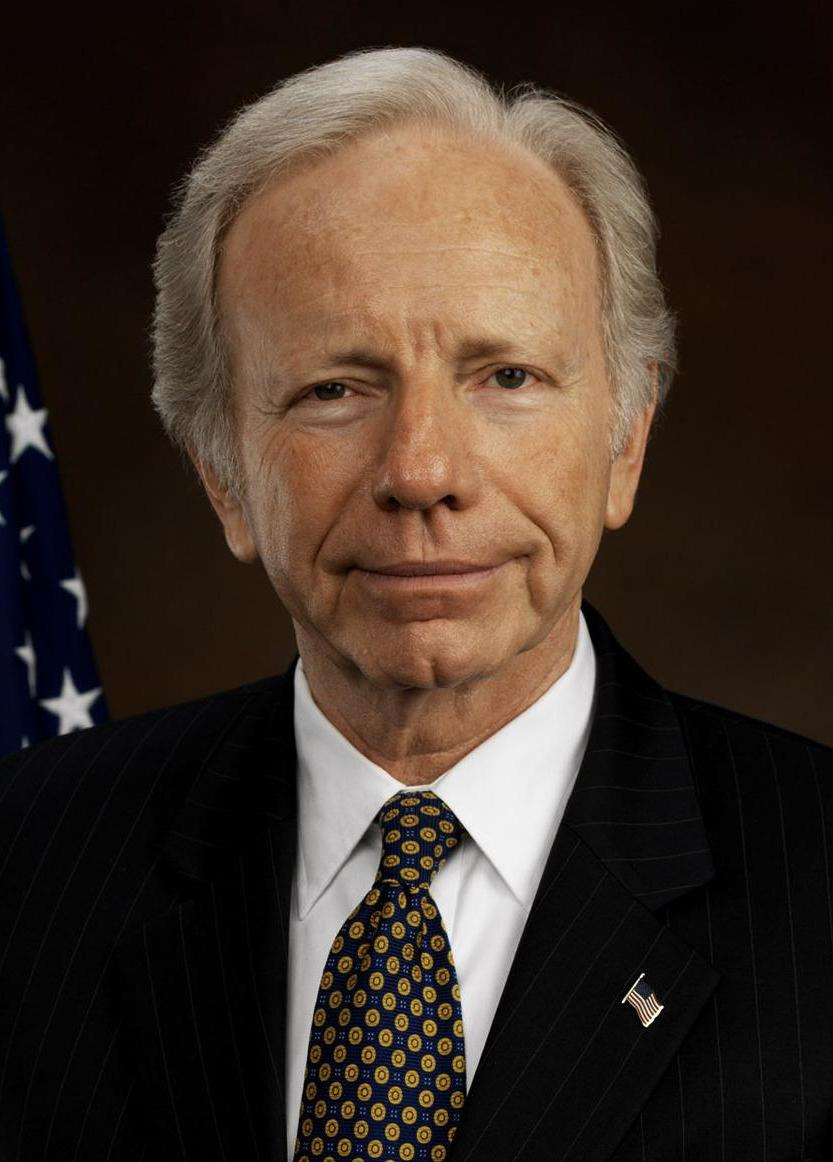

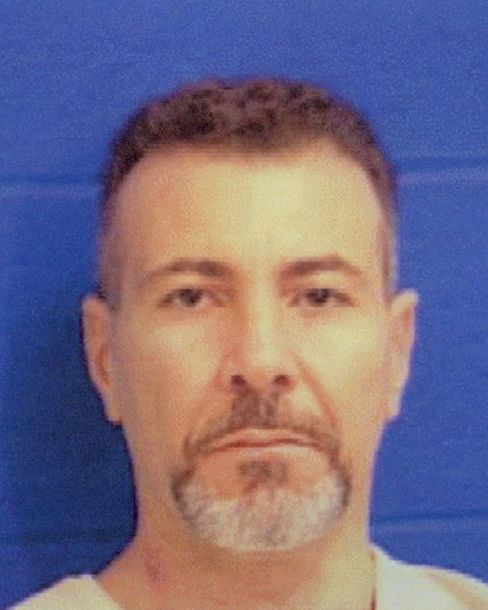
Nominee	Joe Lieberman	Philip Giordano
Party	Democratic	Republican
Popular vote	828,902	448,077
Percentage	63.2%	34.2%
- Lieberman: 40–50% 50–60% 60–70% 70–80% 80–90% Giordano: 50–60%
U.S. senator before election
Joe Lieberman
Democratic
Elected U.S. senator
Joe Lieberman
Democratic

Incumbent Democrat Joe Lieberman won re-election to a third term over Republican Philip Giordano, Mayor of Waterbury and former State Representative. While running for re-election, he was also Al Gore's running mate in the 2000 presidential campaign. With Gore losing the presidency to George W. Bush, Lieberman returned to the Senate and remained there for another 13 years, when he retired. Had the Gore–Lieberman ticket won, Lieberman would have become U.S. Vice President and forced to resign his Senate seat, which would have led to a 2002 special election. It would also have led Republican Governor John G. Rowland to temporarily appoint an interim replacement.

Lieberman, a very popular centrist incumbent, focused on his vice presidential campaign. He refused to show up at the debates. Giordano was a heavy underdog, as he was ignored by the press and as he debated alone.

General election
Party	Candidate	Votes	%
Democratic	Joe Lieberman (Incumbent)	828,902	63.2
Republican	Philip Giordano	448,077	34.2
Concerned Citizens	William Kozak	25,509	2.0
Libertarian	Wildey J. Moore	8,773	0.7
Majority		380,825	29.0
Turnout		1,311,261	100%
Democratic hold			

== Delaware ==
Delaware election
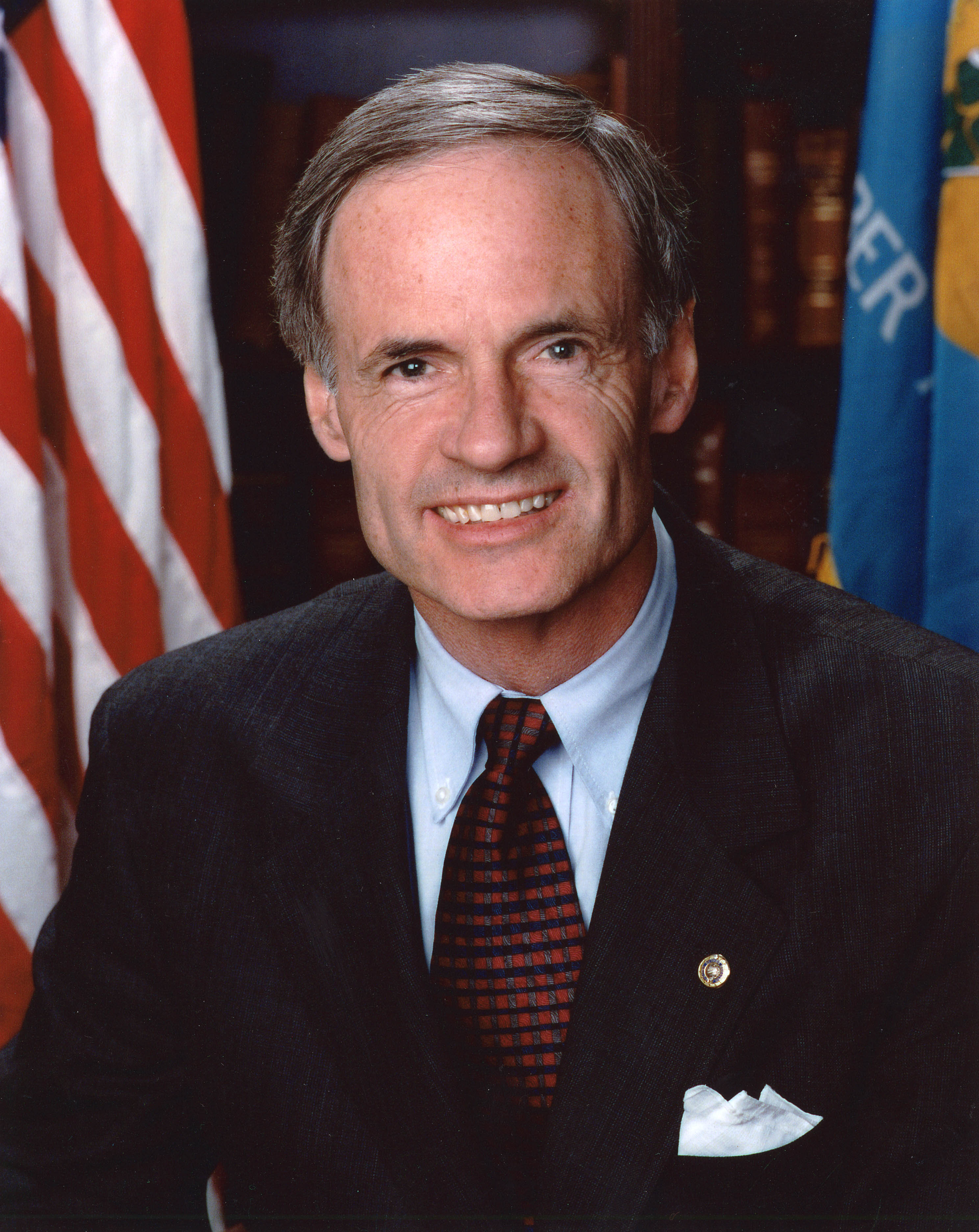

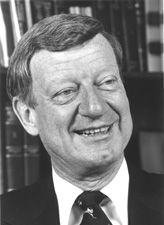
Nominee	Tom Carper	William Roth
Party	Democratic	Republican
Popular vote	181,566	142,891
Percentage	55.5%	43.7%
- County results Carper: 60–70% Roth: 50–60%
U.S. senator before election
William Roth
Republican
Elected U.S. senator
Tom Carper
Democratic

Incumbent Republican William Roth ran for re-election to a sixth term, but was defeated by Governor Tom Carper.

For 16 years the same four people had held the four major statewide positions. Because of term limits on the Governor's position Thomas Carper could not run again. Both he and U.S. Representative Michael Castle wanted to be U.S. senator. Roth would not retire, and fellow Republican Castle decided against a primary.

Roth, 79, was in the U.S. Senate for 30 years. He was the Chairman of the Finance Committee. Carper, 53, was a popular Governor and former U.S. Congressman of Delaware's At-large congressional district, who announced his major candidacy against Roth back in September 1999. Both candidates were moderates. Roth was one of the few Republicans to vote for the Brady Bill. Although Roth started the campaign with a 2-to-1 spending advantage, Carper went into the final month with more than $1 million on hand. In a contest between two popular and respected politicians, the issue seemed to be Roth's age versus Carper's relative youth.

Carper defeated Roth by over ten points. However, Roth received more votes than Presidential candidate George W. Bush, suggesting the strength of the Democratic turnout was a boon to Carper's candidacy and a key element of his victory. Many consider Roth's defeat due to his age and health, as he collapsed twice during the campaign, once in the middle of a television interview and once during a campaign event.

General election
Party	Candidate	Votes	%	±%
Democratic	Thomas Carper	181,566	55.53	+13.04%
Republican	William Roth (Incumbent)	142,891	43.70	−12.12%
Libertarian	J. Burke Morrison	1,103	0.34	−1.36%
Constitution	Mark E. Dankof	1,044	0.32	
Natural Law	Robert Mattson	389	0.12	
Majority		38,675	11.83	−1.51%
Turnout		326,993		
Democratic gain from Republican		Swing		

== Florida ==
2000 United States Senate election in Florida
- November 7, 2000
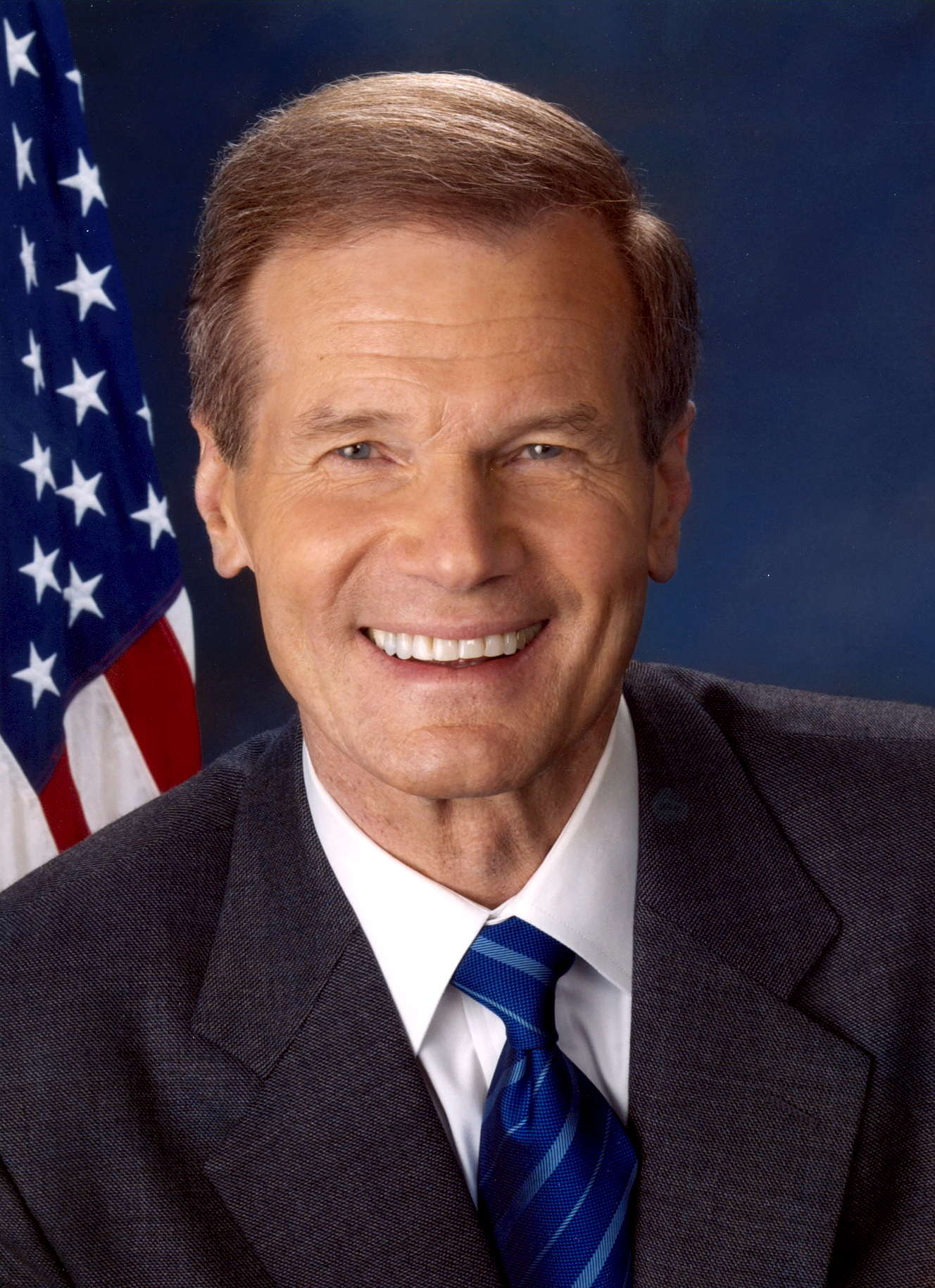

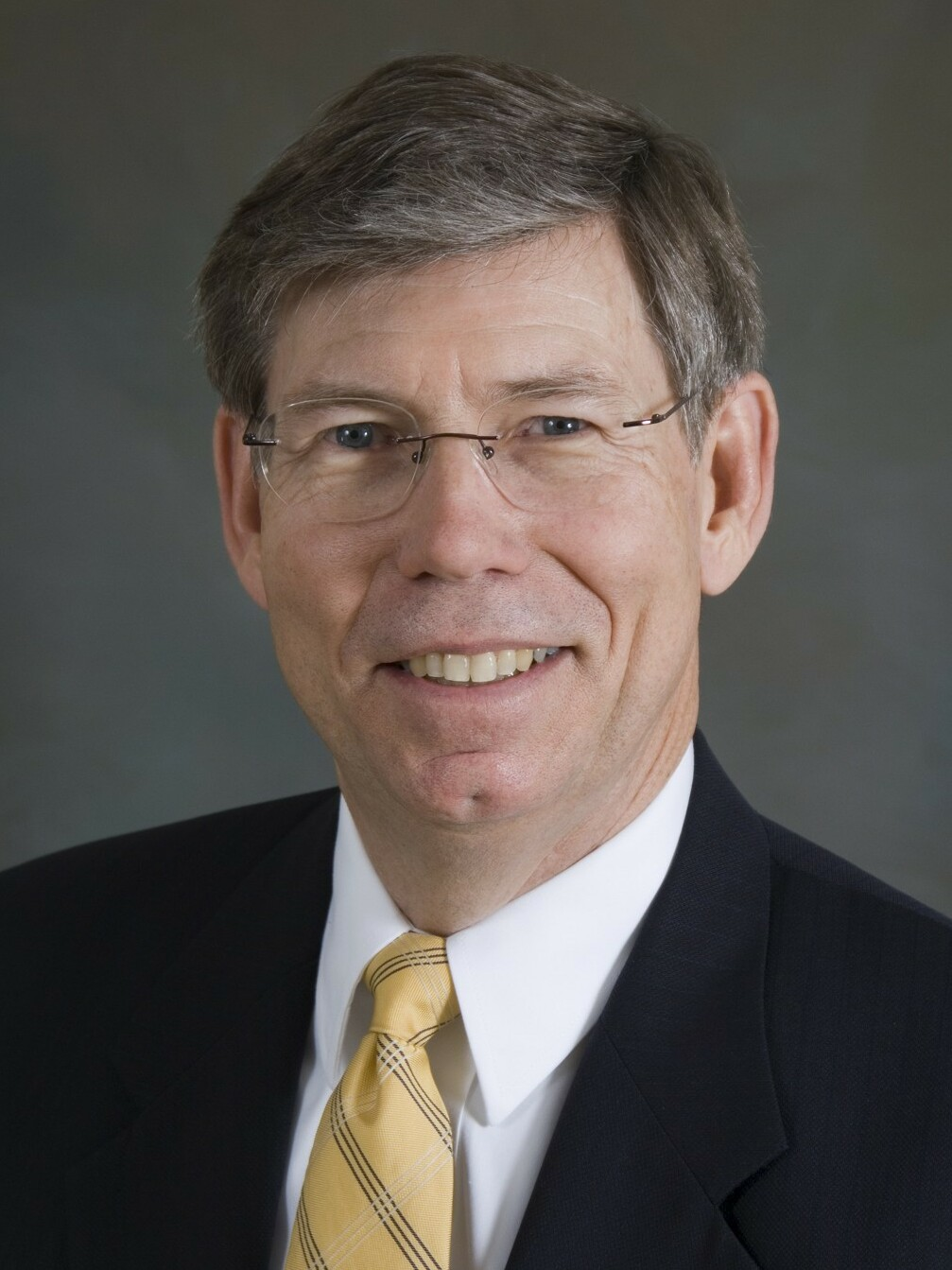
Nominee	Bill Nelson	Bill McCollum
Party	Democratic	Republican
Popular vote	2,989,487	2,705,348
Percentage	51.04%	46.19%
- Nelson: 40–50% 50–60% 60–70% McCollum: 40–50% 50–60% 60–70% 70–80%
U.S. senator before election
Connie Mack III
Republican
Elected U.S. Senator
Bill Nelson
Democratic

Incumbent Republican Connie Mack III decided to retire instead of seeking a third term. Democrat Bill Nelson, State Treasurer and former U.S. Representative, won the open seat over Republican Congressman Bill McCollum.

Republican primary
Party	Candidate	Votes	%
Republican	Bill McCollum	660,592	81.13
Republican	Hamilton A. S. Bartlett	153,613	18.87
Total votes		814,205	100

Democratic primary
Party	Candidate	Votes	%
Democratic	Bill Nelson	692,147	77.48
Democratic	Newall Jerome Daughtrey	105,650	11.83
Democratic	David B. Higginbottom	95,492	10.69
Total votes		893,289	100

This election was in conjunction to the presidential election, where Bush narrowly defeated Gore after an intense recount. The senate election was evenly matched with two U.S. Congressmen named Bill in their mid-50s. Both parties heavily targeted this senate seat. The election became very nasty as Nelson called his opponent "an extremist who would sacrifice the elderly, the poor, and the working class to coddle the rich". McCollum called the Democrat "a liberal who would tax everything that moves, and some things that don't." The election advertisements were very negative, as both candidates talked more about each other than themselves.

Nelson raised only soft money, but had help from President Bill Clinton and VP Al Gore. Two days before the election, McCollum predicted he would win by a 6-point margin. On election day, he lost by a 5-point margin.

General election
Party	Candidate	Votes	%	±%
Democratic	Bill Nelson	2,989,487	51.04	
Republican	Bill McCollum	2,705,348	46.19	
Independent	Willie Logan	80,830	1.38	
Natural Law	Joe Simonetta	26,087	0.45	
Independent	Darrell L. McCormick	21,664	0.37	
Reform	Joel Deckard	17,338	0.30	
Independent	Andy Martin	15,889	0.27	
Write-in	Nikki Oldaker	88	0.00	
Majority		284,139	4.85	
Turnout		5,856,731		
Democratic gain from Republican		Swing		

== Georgia (special) ==
Georgia special election
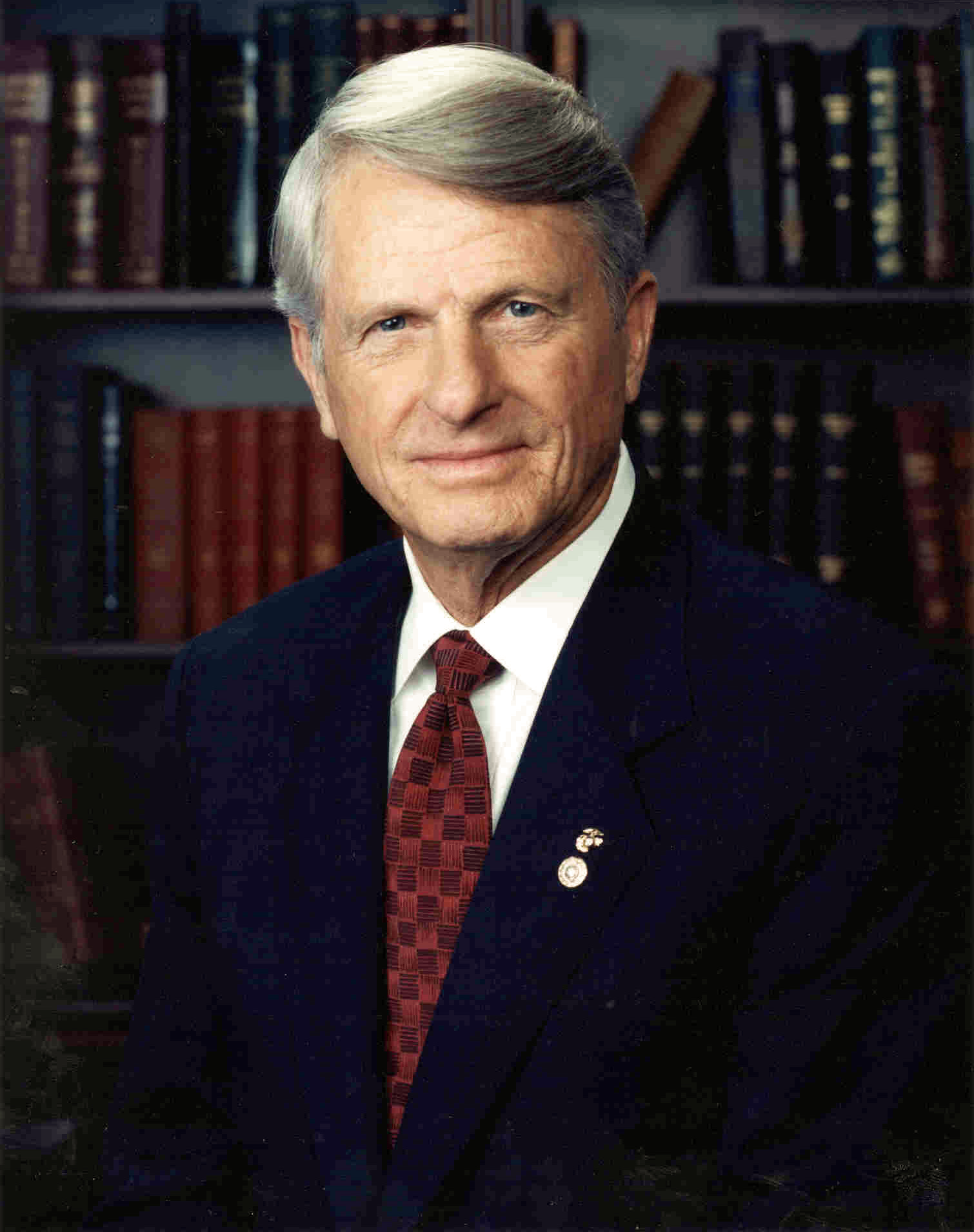

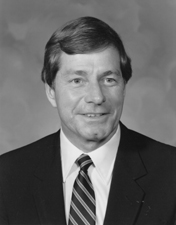
Nominee	Zell Miller	Mack Mattingly
Party	Democratic	Republican
Popular vote	1,413,224	920,478
Percentage	58.1%	37.9%
- Miller: 40–50% 50–60% 60–70% 70–80% Mattingly: 40–50% 50–60%
U.S. senator before election
Zell Miller
Democratic
Elected U.S. senator
Zell Miller
Democratic

Incumbent Democrat Zell Miller, who was appointed by Democrat Governor Roy Barnes to replace Republican Paul Coverdell following his death, won re-election to serve the remainder of the term, beating Republican Mack Mattingly, former Ambassador to Seychelles and former U.S. senator. Until 2020, when Raphael Warnock won this seat, and Jon Ossoff won the other Senate seat, this was the last Senate election in Georgia won by a Democrat and also until 2020, this was the last time the Democrats have won the Class III Senate seat from Georgia.

One of the biggest campaign issues was Social Security. Miller attacked Mattingly for supporting a raise in the retirement age. The Republican fought back by connecting him to liberal Democrat Ted Kennedy of Massachusetts, and on his vote to block legislation aimed at protecting Social Security. Mattingly said he would vote for Texas Governor George W. Bush for president, who was very popular in the state and led Vice President Al Gore in many Georgia polls. Mattingly then asked Miller who he was supporting in the presidential election. Miller conceded he would vote for Gore because he helped him when he was governor including drought relief, welfare reform, and the Atlanta Olympics. "That does not mean I agree with all of his policies," he concluded. In early October, a poll showed Miller leading with 59% of the vote, despite the fact that Bush was leading Gore by a double-digit margin.

Note: This election was a non-partisan election due to it being a special election. Each candidate ran without a party. The parties below reflect which party label each candidate would have run under if given the option.

General election
Party	Candidate	Votes	%	±%
Democratic	Zell Miller (incumbent)	1,413,224	58.19	
Republican	Mack Mattingly	920,478	37.90	
Libertarian	Paul Robert MacGregor	25,942	1.07	
Republican	Ben Ballenger	22,975	0.95	
Green	Jeff Gates	21,249	0.88	
Republican	Bobby Wood	12,499	0.51	
Independent	Winnie Walsh	11,875	0.49	
Majority		492,746	20.29	
Turnout		2,428,242		

== Hawaii ==
Hawaii election
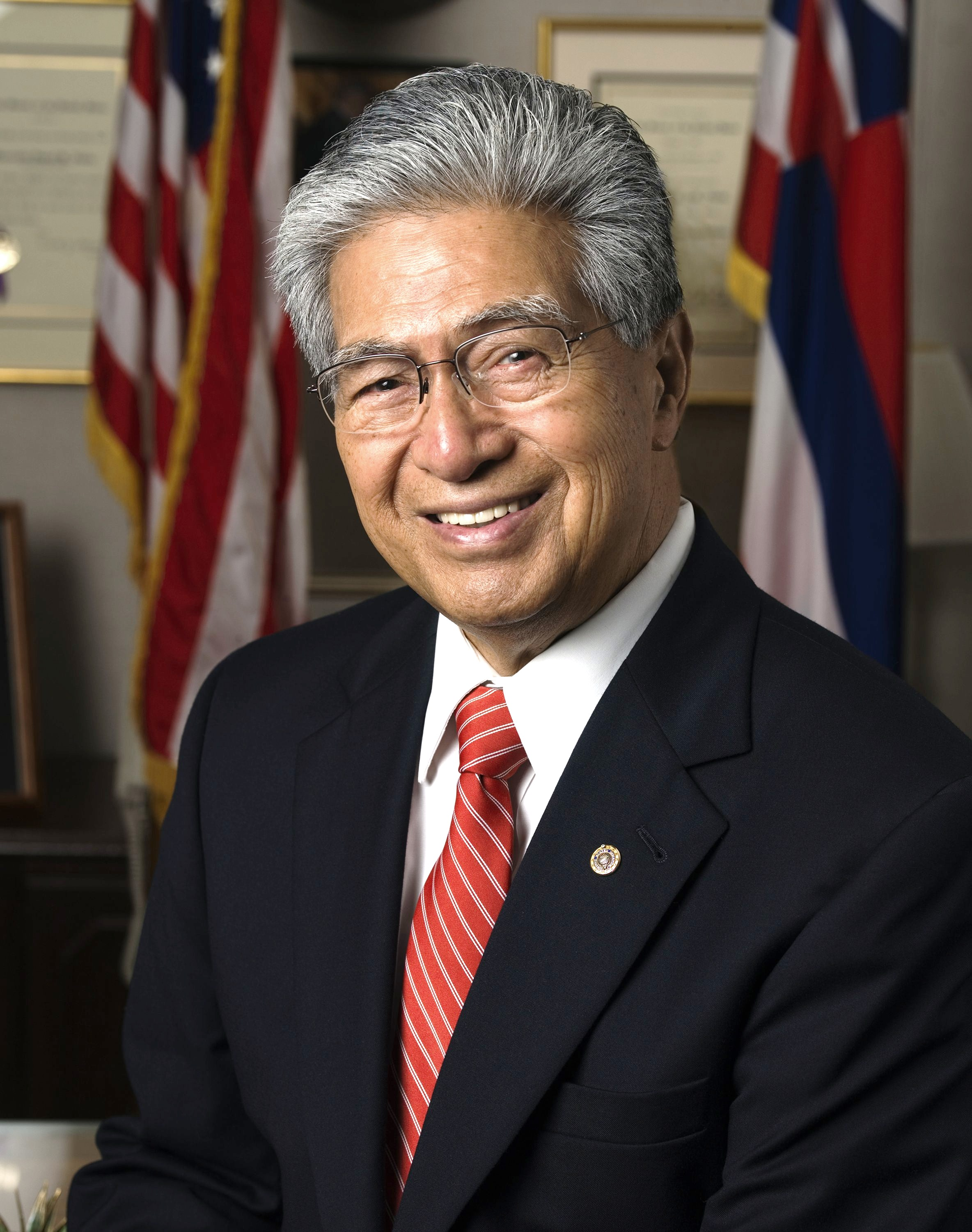

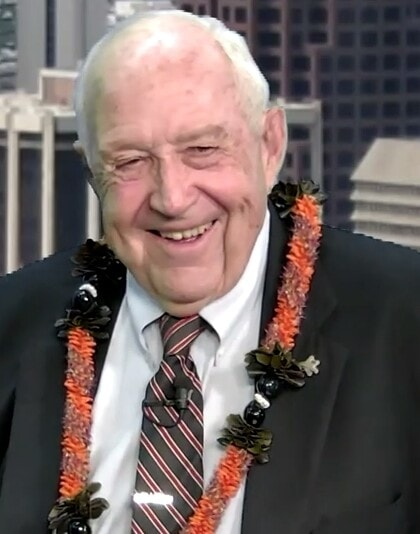
Nominee	Daniel Akaka	John Carroll
Party	Democratic	Republican
Popular vote	251,215	84,701
Percentage	72.7%	24.5%
- County results Akaka: 70–80%
U.S. senator before election
Daniel Akaka
Democratic
Elected U.S. senator
Daniel Akaka
Democratic

Incumbent Democrat Daniel Akaka won re-election to his second full term, over Republican John Carroll, former State senator and former State Representative.

General election
Party	Candidate	Votes	%	±%
Democratic	Daniel Akaka (Incumbent)	251,215	72.6	
Republican	John Carroll	84,701	24.5	
Natural Law	Lauri A. Clegg	4,220	1.2	
Libertarian	Lloyd Jeffrey Mallan	3,127	0.9	
Constitution	David Porter	2,360	0.7	
Majority		166,514	48.1	
Turnout		245,263	100.00	
Democratic hold		Swing		

== Indiana ==
Indiana election
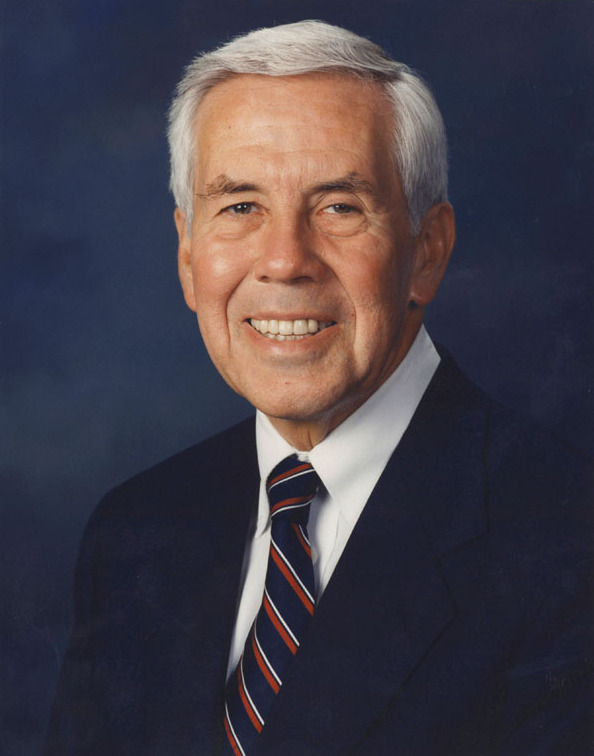

Nominee	Richard Lugar	David L. Johnson
Party	Republican	Democratic
Popular vote	1,427,944	683,273
Percentage	66.5%	31.9%
- County results Lugar: 50-60% 60-70% 70-80% 80-90% Johnson: 50–60%
U.S. senator before election
Richard Lugar
Republican
Elected U.S. senator
Richard Lugar
Republican

Incumbent Republican Richard Lugar was re-elected to his fifth six-year term over Democrat David Johnson.

Lugar easily won re-election taking 66.5% one of the largest margins in a statewide race in Indiana history. Johnson only took one county, Lake County, a Democratic stronghold which borders Chicago.

General election
Party	Candidate	Votes	%	±%
Republican	Richard Lugar (Incumbent)	1,427,944	66.56%	−0.79%
Democratic	David L. Johnson	683,273	31.85%	+1.35%
Libertarian	Paul Hager	33,992	1.58%	+0.46
Majority		744,671	34.71%	−2.14%
Turnout		2,145,209	55%	
Republican hold				

== Maine ==
Maine election
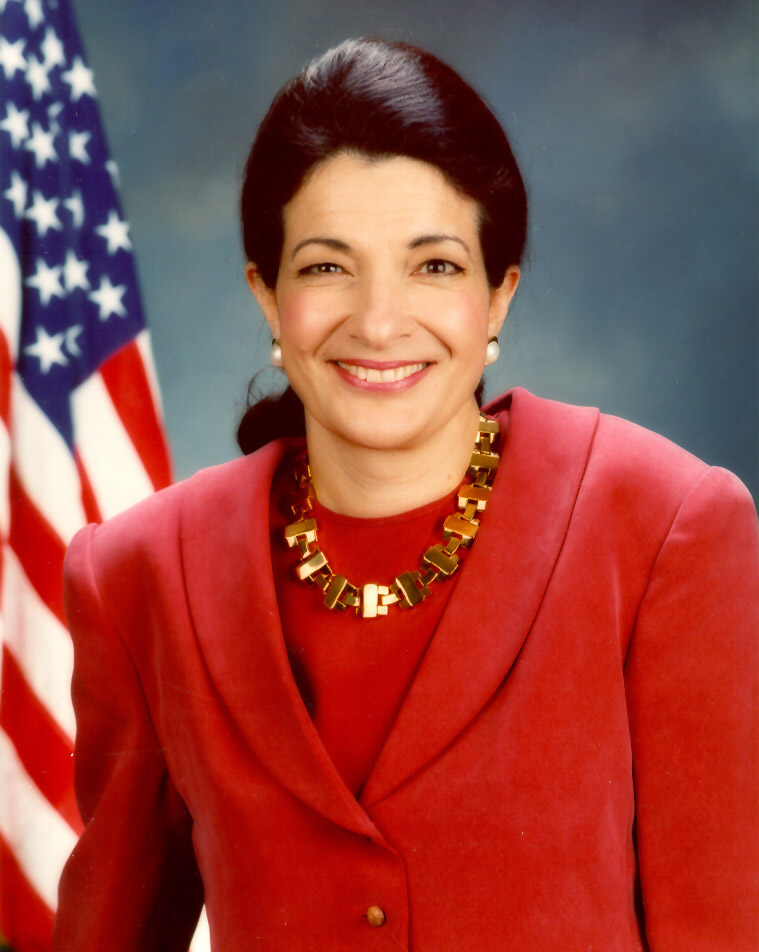

Nominee	Olympia Snowe	Mark Lawrence
Party	Republican	Democratic
Popular vote	437,689	197,183
Percentage	68.94%	31.06%
- Snowe: 50–60% 60–70% 70–80% 80–90% >90% Lawrence: 50–60%
U.S. senator before election
Olympia Snowe
Republican
Elected U.S. senator
Olympia Snowe
Republican

Incumbent Republican Olympia Snowe was re-elected to a second term, defeating Democratic candidate Mark Lawrence, former President of the Maine State Senate.

Snowe, a popular moderate incumbent, outpolled and outspent Lawrence. The two candidates agreed to debate on October 15 and 25.

General election
Party	Candidate	Votes	%	±%
Republican	Olympia Snowe (Incumbent)	437,689	68.94	+8.70%
Democratic	Mark W. Lawrence	197,183	31.06	−5.30%
Majority		240,506	37.88	+14.00%
Turnout		634,872		
Republican hold		Swing		

== Maryland ==
Maryland election
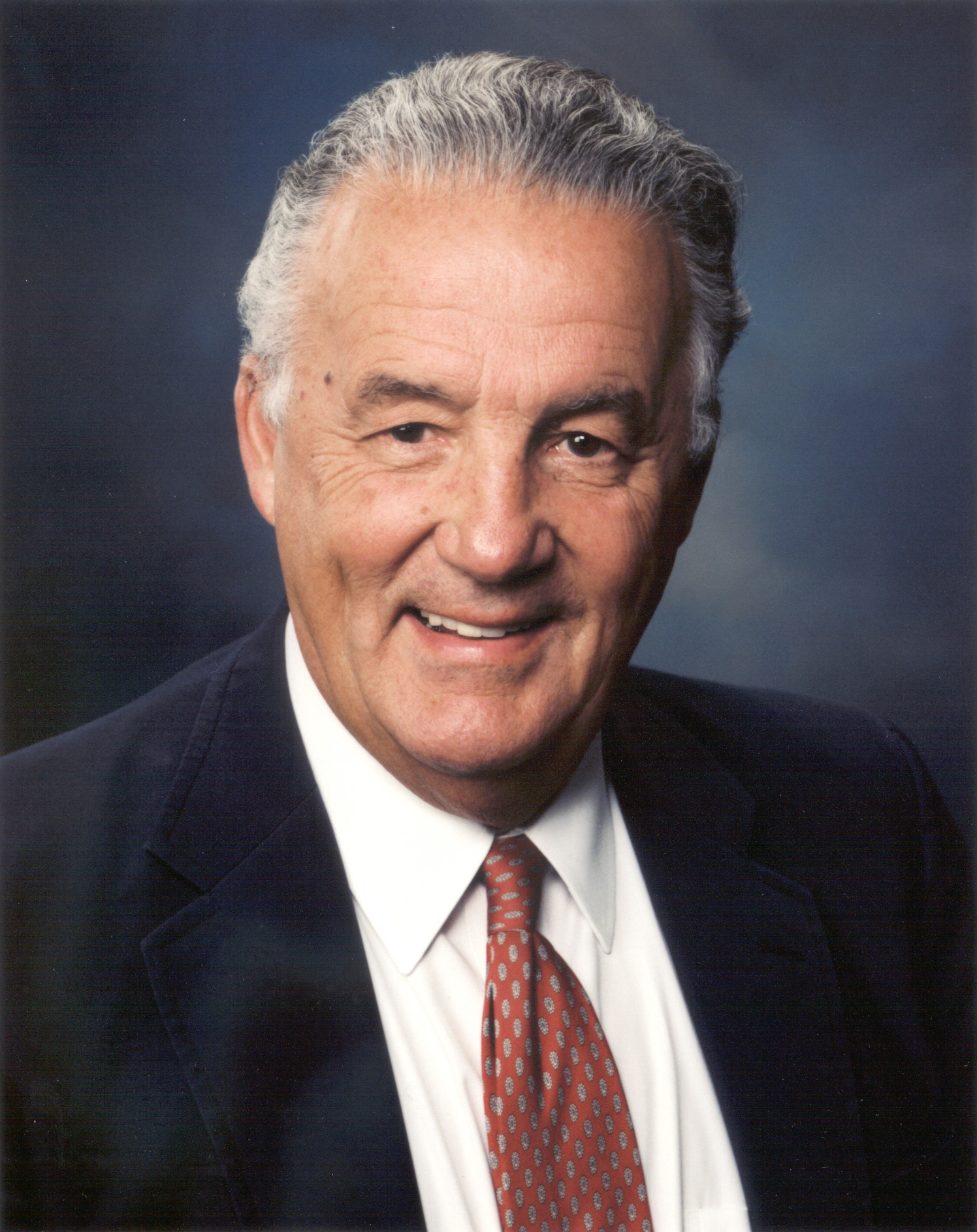

Nominee	Paul Sarbanes	Paul Rappaport
Party	Democratic	Republican
Popular vote	1,230,013	715,178
Percentage	63.2%	36.7%
- County results Sarbanes: 50–60% 60–70% 80–90% Rappaport: 50–60% 60–70%
U.S. senator before election
Paul S. Sarbanes
Democratic
Elected U.S. senator
Paul S. Sarbanes
Democratic

Incumbent Democrat Paul Sarbanes won re-election to a fifth term over Republican Paul Rappaport, former Howard County police chief and nominee for Lieutenant Governor in 1994.

Rappaport won the Republican primary against S. Rob Sobhani, Ross Zimmerman Pierpont, Robin Ficker, Kenneth R. Timmerman, Kenneth Wayman and John Stafford through a grassroots movement with a plurality of just 23%. Rappaport, a major underdog, pushed for three debates. The four term incumbent actually agreed to one debate on October 26.

General election
Party	Candidate	Votes	%	±%
Democratic	Paul Sarbanes (Incumbent)	1,230,013	63.2	
Republican	Paul Rappaport	715,178	35.7	
Other	Write-ins	1,594	0.1	
Independent	Corrogan R. Vaughn (write-in)	113		
Turnout		1,946,898	100.0	
Democratic hold		Swing		

== Massachusetts ==
Massachusetts election
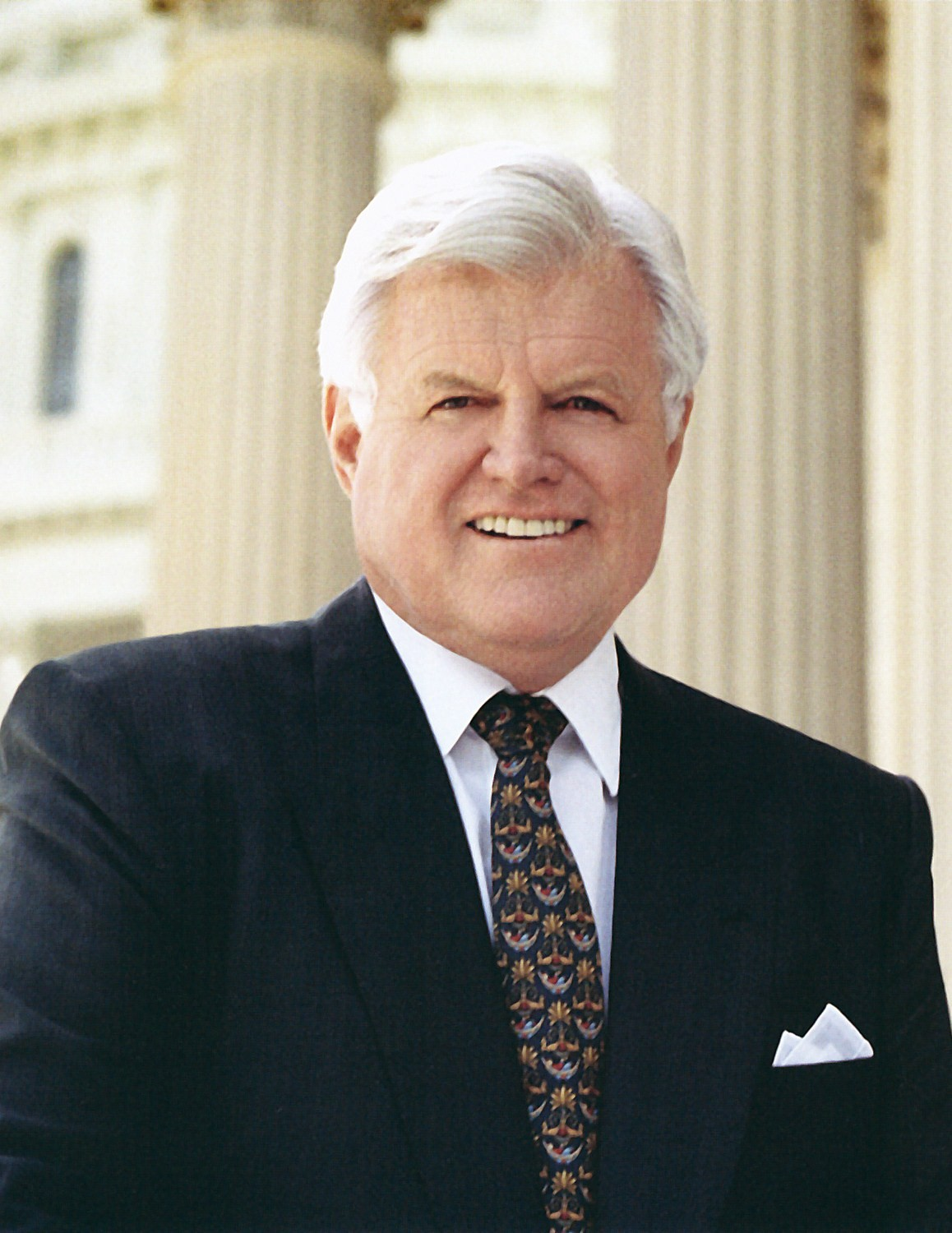

Nominee	Ted Kennedy	Jack E. Robinson III	Carla Howell
Party	Democratic	Republican	Libertarian
Popular vote	1,889,494	334,341	308 860
Percentage	72.7%	12.9%	11.9%

Kennedy
40–50%
50–60%
60–70%
70–80%
80–90%
U.S. senator before election
Ted Kennedy
Democratic
Elected U.S. senator
Ted Kennedy
Democratic

Incumbent Democrat Ted Kennedy won re-election to his eighth (his seventh full) term. The election was notable for a strong third-party performance from Libertarian Carla Howell, who finished less than a percent behind Republican Jack E. Robinson.

General election
Party	Candidate	Votes	%	±%
Democratic	Ted Kennedy (Incumbent)	1,889,494	72.69	
Republican	Jack E. Robinson	334,341	12.86	
Libertarian	Carla Howell	308,860	11.88	
Constitution	Philip F. Lawler	42,113	1.62	+1.62
Independent	Dale E. Friedgen	13,687	0.53	N/A
Timesizing Not Downsizing	Philip Hyde III	8,452	0.33	+0.33
Others	All others	2,473	0.10	
Total votes		2,734,006	100	
Democratic hold		Swing		

== Michigan ==
Michigan election
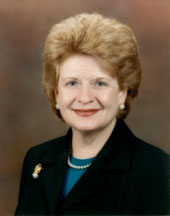

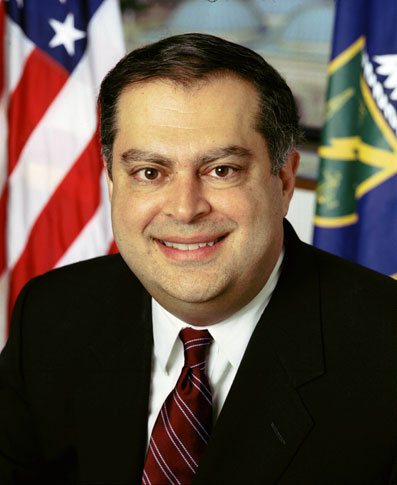
Nominee	Debbie Stabenow	Spencer Abraham
Party	Democratic	Republican
Popular vote	2,061,952	1,994,693
Percentage	49.5%	47.9%
- Stabenow: 40–50% 50–60% 60–70% Abraham: 40–50% 50–60% 60–70% 70–80%
U.S. senator before election
Spencer Abraham
Republican
Elected U.S. senator
Debbie Stabenow
Democratic

Incumbent Republican Spencer Abraham ran for re-election to a second term, but was defeated by Democrat Debbie Stabenow.

Abraham, who was first elected in the 1994 Republican Revolution despite never running for public office before, was considered vulnerable by the Democratic Senatorial Campaign Committee. Major issues in the campaign included prescription drugs for the elderly. By September 4, Abraham still had failed to reach 50% in polls despite having spent over $6 million on television ads. In mid-October, he came back and reached 50% and 49% in two polls respectively.

The election was very close with Stabenow prevailing by just over 67,000 votes. Stabenow was also likely helped by the fact that Al Gore won Michigan on the presidential level. Ultimately, Stabenow pulled out huge numbers of the Democratic stronghold of Wayne County, which covers the Detroit Metropolitan Area. Stabenow also performed well in other heavily populated areas such as Ingham County home to the state's capital of Lansing, and the college town of Ann Arbor. Abraham did not concede right after major news networks declared Stabenow the winner; He held out hope that the few outstanding precincts could push him over the edge. At 4:00 am, Abraham conceded defeat. Senator Abraham called Stabenow and congratulated her on her victory. A historic election, Stabenow became the first woman to represent Michigan in the United States Senate.

General election
Party	Candidate	Votes	%	±%
Democratic	Debbie Stabenow	2,061,952	49.47	
Republican	Spencer Abraham (Incumbent)	1,994,693	47.86	
Green	Matthew Abel	37,542	0.90	
Libertarian	Michael Corliss	29,966	0.72	
Reform	Mark Forton	26,274	0.63	
Constitution	John Mangopoulos	11,628	0.28	
Natural Law	William Quarton	5,630	0.14	
Majority		67,259	1.61	
Turnout		4,165,685		
Democratic gain from Republican		Swing	-4.02	

== Minnesota ==
Minnesota election

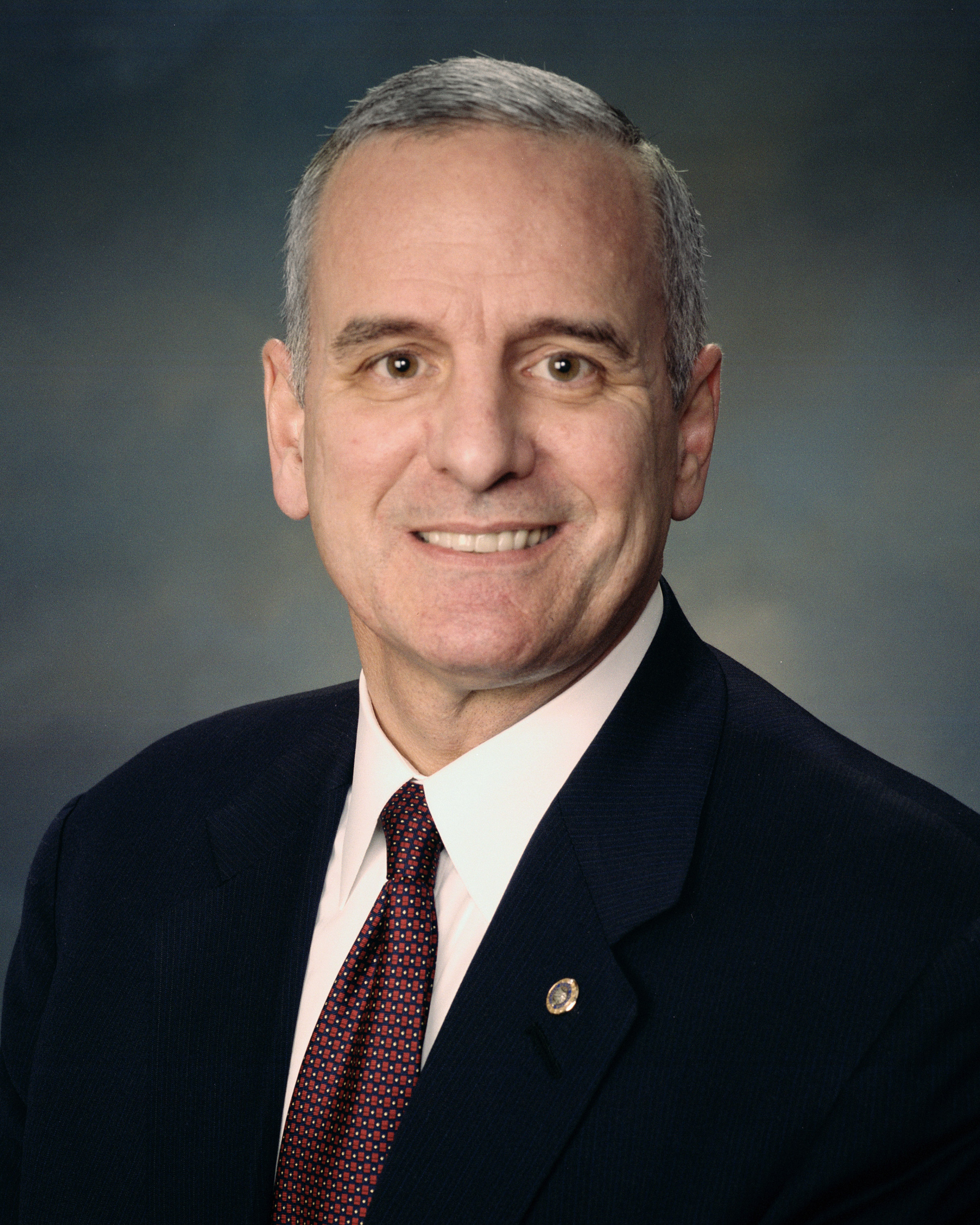

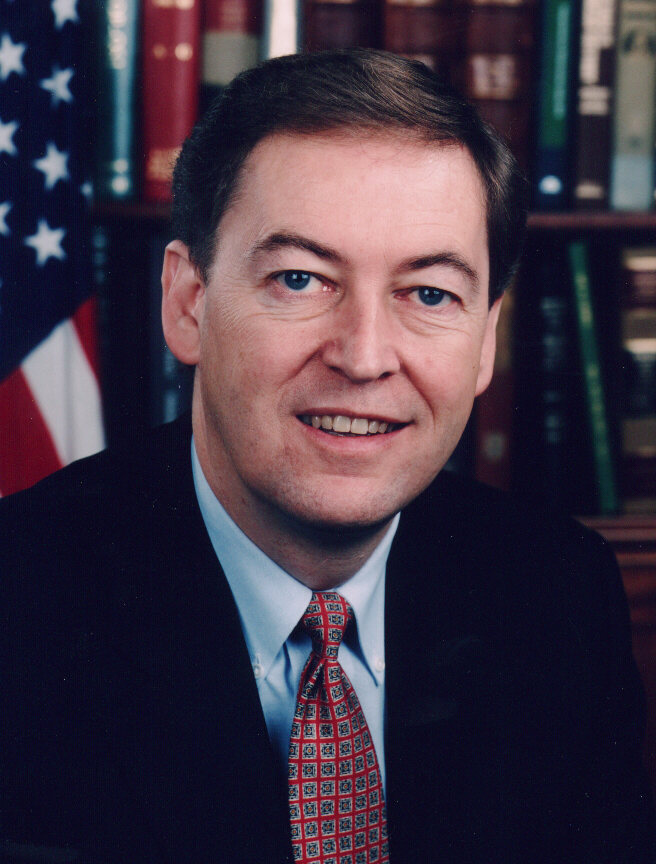
Nominee	Mark Dayton	Rod Grams
Party	Democratic (DFL)	Republican
Popular vote	1,181,553	1,047,474
Percentage	48.8%	43.3%
Nominee	James Gibson
Party	Independence
Popular vote	140,583
Percentage	5.81%
- Dayton: 30–40% 40–50% 50–60% 60–70% Grams: 40–50% 50–60%
U.S. senator before election
Rod Grams
Republican
Elected U.S. senator
Mark Dayton
Democratic (DFL)

The race pitted incumbent Republican senator Rod Grams against former Minnesota State Auditor Mark Dayton.

General election
Party	Candidate	Votes	%	±%
Democratic (DFL)	Mark Dayton	1,181,553	48.83	+4.73%
Republican	Rod Grams (Incumbent)	1,047,474	43.29	−5.76%
Independence	James Gibson	140,583	5.81	+0.43%
Grassroots	David Daniels	21,447	0.89	−0.01%
Socialist Workers	Rebecca Ellis	12,956	0.54	+0.40%
Constitution	David Swan	8,915	0.37	n/a
Libertarian	Erik D. Pakieser	6,588	0.27	n/a
Write-in	Ole Savior	4	0.00	n/a
Majority		134,079	5.54	
Turnout		2,419,520	74.10	

== Mississippi ==
Mississippi election
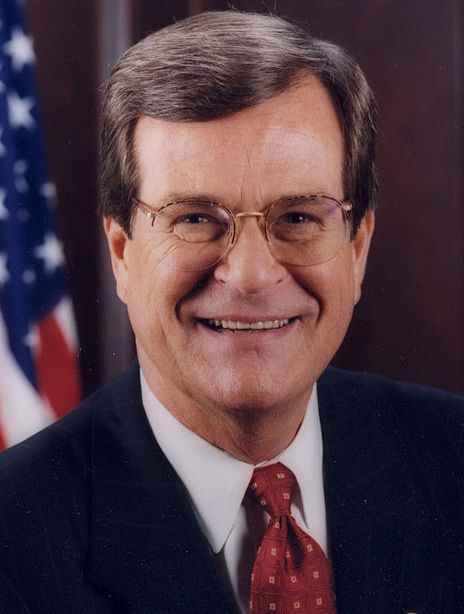

Nominee	Trent Lott	Troy D. Brown
Party	Republican	Democratic
Popular vote	654,941	314,090
Percentage	65.9%	31.6%
- Lott: 40-50% 50–60% 60–70% 70–80% 80–90% Brown: 40-50% 50–60% 60–70%
U.S. senator before election
Trent Lott
Republican
Elected U.S. senator
Trent Lott
Republican

Incumbent Republican Trent Lott won re-election to a third term over perennial Democratic candidate Troy Brown.

General election
Party	Candidate	Votes	%	±%
Republican	Trent Lott (Incumbent)	654,941	65.88%	−2.92%
Democratic	Troy D. Brown	314,090	31.59%	+0.39%
Independent	Jim Giles	9,344	0.94%	N/A
Libertarian	Lewis Napper	8,454	0.85%	N/A
Reform	Shawn O'Hara	7,315	0.74%	N/A
Republican hold				

== Missouri ==
Missouri election
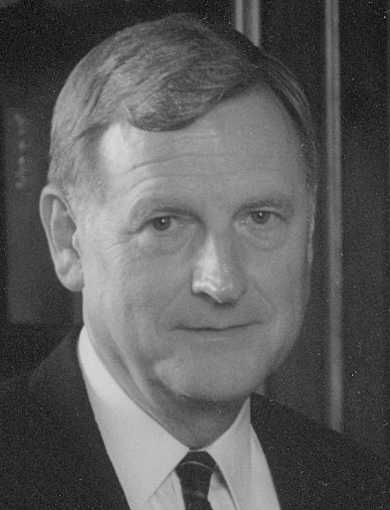

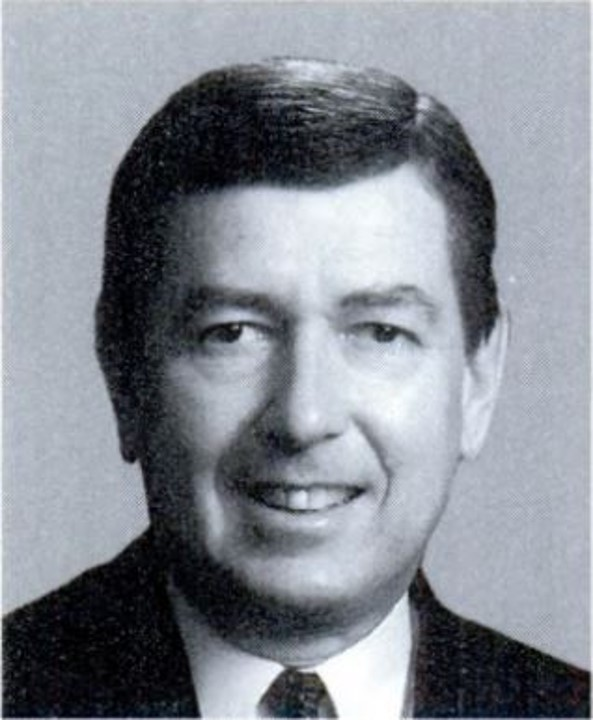
Nominee	Mel Carnahan †	John Ashcroft
Party	Democratic	Republican
Popular vote	1,191,812	1,142,852
Percentage	50.5%	48.4%
- County results Carnahan: 50–60% 60–70% 70–80% Ashcroft: 40–50% 50–60% 60–70% 70–80%
U.S. senator before election
John Ashcroft
Republican
Elected U.S. senator
Mel Carnahan †
Democratic

Incumbent Republican John Ashcroft lost the election to Governor Mel Carnahan, despite Carnahan's death three weeks before election day.

In 1998, Ashcroft briefly considered running for president. On January 5, 1999, he announced that he would not seek the presidency and would instead defend his Senate seat in the 2000 election. Missouri Governor Mel Carnahan announced he would contest the Senate election as a Democrat.

In the general election for the state's seat in the U.S. Senate, Ashcroft was facing then-Governor Mel Carnahan in a "tight" race, despite the senator having a larger budget than Carnahan, a war chest that included significant contributions from corporations such as Monsanto Company, headquartered in St. Louis, Missouri, which gave five times more to Ashcroft's campaign fund than to the fund of any other congressional hopeful at the time.

Carnahan was killed in a plane crash three weeks before the November election date. Nonetheless, Carnahan's name remained on the ballot due to Missouri's election laws. Lieutenant Governor Roger B. Wilson became Governor upon Carnahan's death, to serve the remaining term of Carnahan's governorship. Ashcroft suspended all campaigning on the day of the plane crash in light of the tragedy and resumed it eight days before the election date.

The voters of Missouri, by a margin of approximately fifty thousand votes, chose for the U.S. Senate Mel Carnahan, their Governor who had died two weeks before the election. No one had ever posthumously won election to the Senate, though voters on at least three other occasions had until then chosen deceased candidates for the House of Representatives: Clement Woodnutt Miller (D) in California in 1962; Nick Begich (D) in Alaska, 1972; and Hale Boggs (D) in Louisiana, 1972. Hence, John Ashcroft became the first U.S. Senate candidate to be defeated by a dead opponent.

Governor Roger B. Wilson appointed Carnahan's 66-year-old widow, Jean Carnahan, to fill her husband's vacant seat until the next cycle of Senate elections when a successor could be elected to serve out the remaining four years of the deceased Carnahan's would-be term. Ashcroft stated that he hoped the appointment would be "a matter of comfort for Mrs. Carnahan."

General election
Party	Candidate	Votes	%	±%
Democratic	Mel Carnahan †	1,191,812	50.5	
Republican	John Ashcroft (Incumbent)	1,142,852	48.4	
Green	Evaline Taylor	10,612	0.5	
Libertarian	Grant Samuel Stauffer	10,198	0.4	
Reform	Hugh Foley	4,166	0.2	
Natural Law	Charles Dockins	1,933	0.1	
Write-ins	Write-in candidates	13		
Turnout		2,361,586		
Democratic gain from Republican				

== Montana ==
Montana election
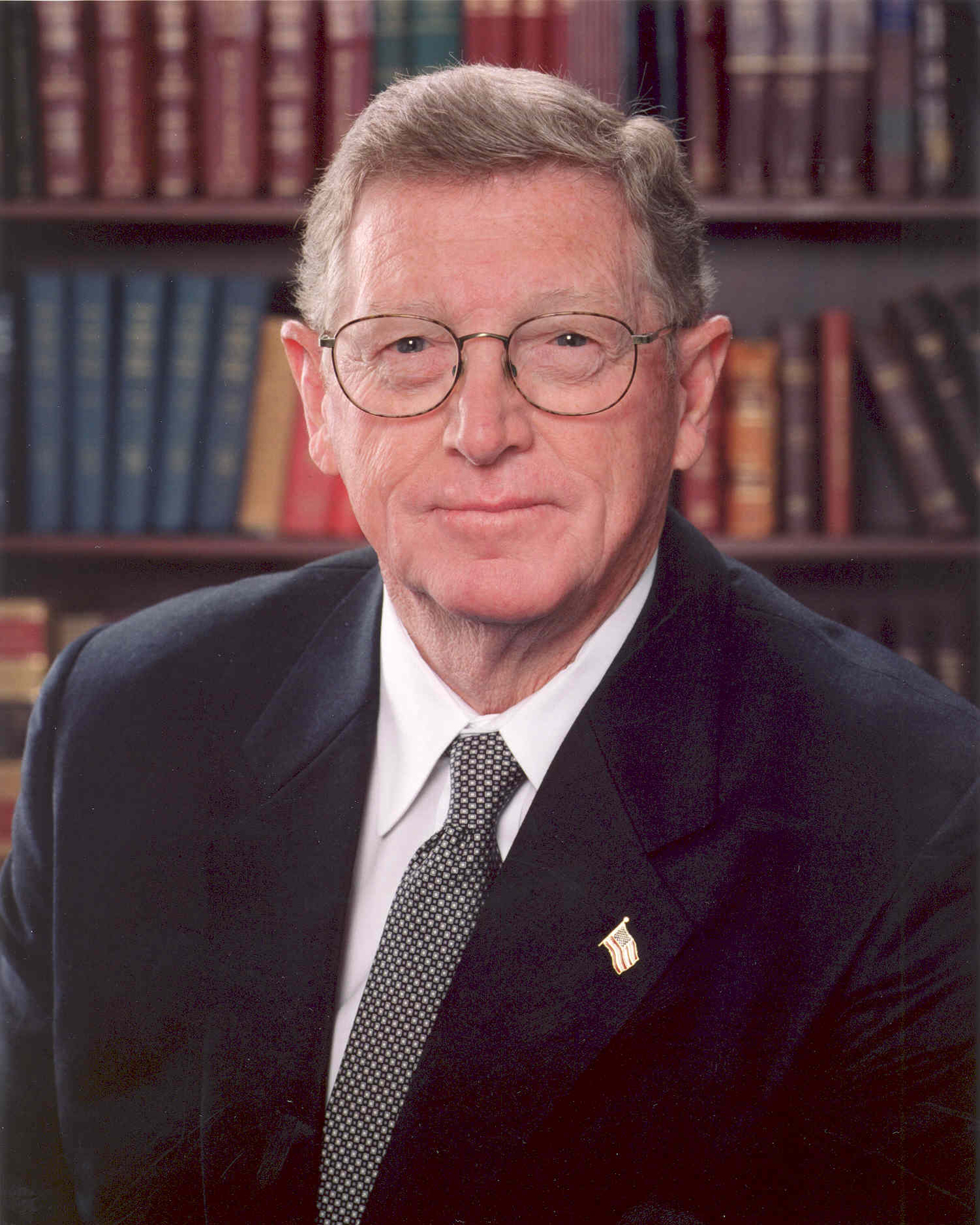

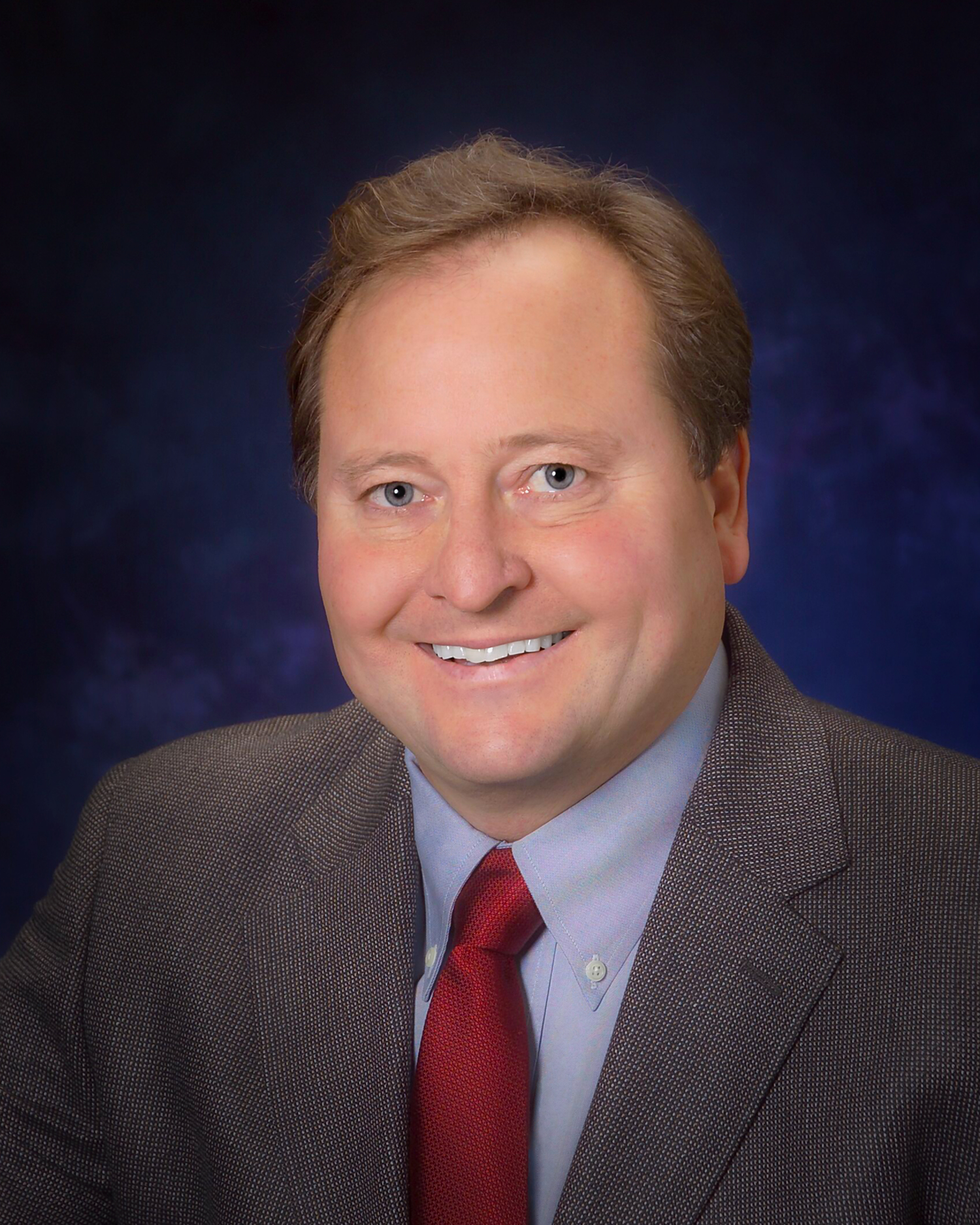
Nominee	Conrad Burns	Brian Schweitzer
Party	Republican	Democratic
Popular vote	208,082	194,430
Percentage	50.6%	47.2%
- County results Burns: 40-50% 50-60% 60-70% 70-80% 80-90% Schweitzer: 50–60% 60–70% 70–80%
U.S. senator before election
Conrad Burns
Republican
Elected U.S. senator
Conrad Burns
Republican

Incumbent Republican Conrad Burns won re-election to a third term.

Democratic primary
Party	Candidate	Votes	%
Democratic	Brian Schweitzer	59,189	66.18
Democratic	John Driscoll	30,242	33.82
Total votes		89,431	100.00

Republican primary
Party	Candidate	Votes	%
Republican	Conrad Burns (Incumbent)	102,125	100.00
Total votes		102,125	100.00

Reform primary
Party	Candidate	Votes	%
Reform	Sam Rankin	1,110	100.00
Total votes		1,110	100.00

Though Sam Rankin won the Reform Party's nomination for the United States Senate, he dropped out of the race over the summer and was replaced by Gary Lee.

Conrad, in a poll released September 21, was leading Schweitzer 48% to 39% that went down from 49% in November 1999. Schweitzer had his polls go up by 11 points.

Burns faced a surprisingly difficult re-election campaign in 2000. In February 1999, he announced that he would break his 1988 promise to only hold office for two terms, claiming "Circumstances have changed, and I have rethought my position." Later that same month, while giving a speech about U.S. dependence on foreign oil to the Montana Equipment Dealers Association, he referred to Arabs as "ragheads". Burns soon apologized, saying he "became too emotionally involved" during the speech.

Burns faced Brian Schweitzer, a rancher from Whitefish, Montana. While Burns attempted to link Schweitzer with presidential candidate Al Gore, whom Schweitzer never met, Schweitzer "effectively portrayed himself as nonpolitical". Schweitzer primarily challenged Burns on the issue of prescription drugs, organizing busloads of senior citizens to take trips to Canada and Mexico for cheaper medicine. Burns charged that Schweitzer favored "Canadian-style government controls" and claimed that senior citizens went to doctors to have "somebody to visit with. There's nothing wrong with them." Burns also faced trouble regarding deaths from asbestos in Libby, Montana. While he initially supported a bill to limit compensation in such cases, he withdrew his support for the bill, under public criticism, and added $11.5 million for the town to an appropriations bill.

Burns spent twice as much money as Schweitzer on the election and only defeated him by a slim margin, 51-47 percent, while the state voted 58-33 percent for Republican presidential nominee George W. Bush. Schweitzer went on to become governor in 2004.

General election
Party	Candidate	Votes	%	±%
Republican	Conrad Burns (Incumbent)	208,082	50.55	−11.82%
Democratic	Brian Schweitzer	194,430	47.24	+9.61%
Reform	Gary Lee	9,089	2.2	
Majority		13,652	3.32	−21.43%
Turnout		411,601		
Republican hold		Swing		

== Nebraska ==
Nebraska election
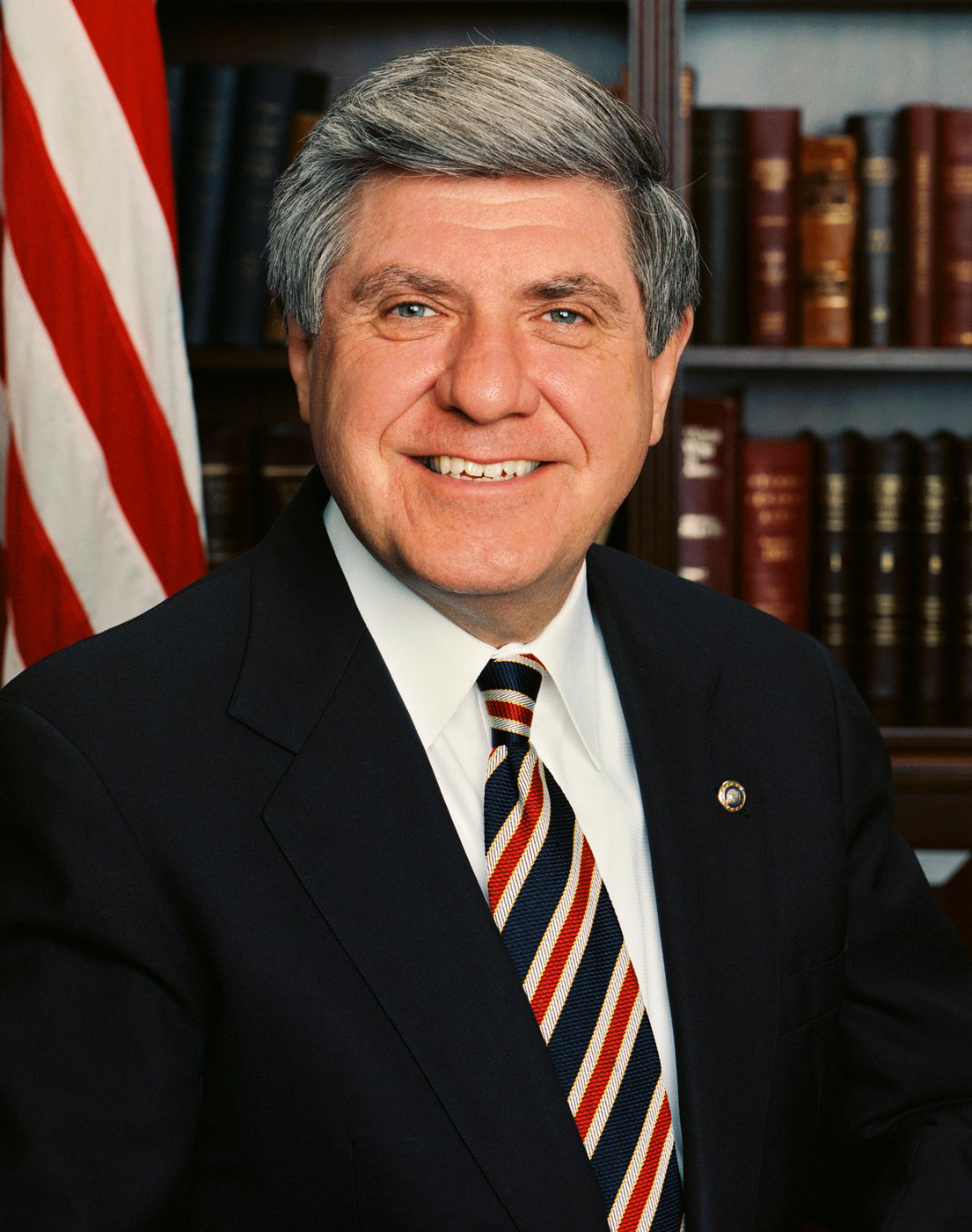

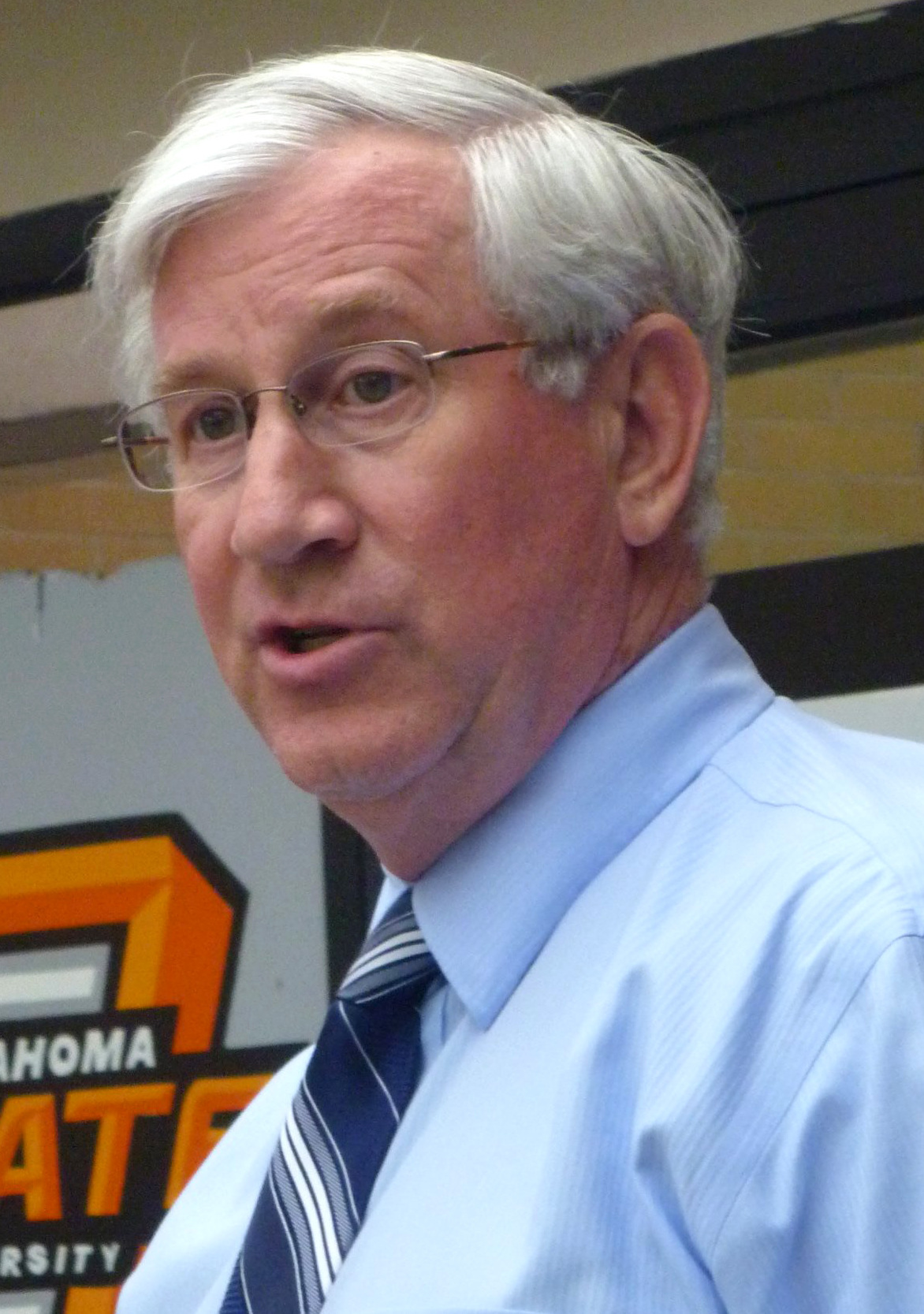
Nominee	Ben Nelson	Don Stenberg
Party	Democratic	Republican
Popular vote	353,093	337,977
Percentage	51.0%	48.8%
- County results Nelson: 50–60% 60–70% Stenberg: 50–60% 60–70% 70–80%
U.S. senator before election
Bob Kerrey
Democratic
Elected U.S. senator
Ben Nelson
Democratic

Incumbent Democrat Bob Kerrey decided to retire. Democrat Ben Nelson won the open seat, beating Don Stenberg, the Republican Attorney General of Nebraska.

Democratic primary
Party	Candidate	Votes	%
Democratic	Ben Nelson	105,661	92.12
Democratic	Al Hamburg	8,482	7.39
Democratic	Write-ins	558	0.49
Total votes		114,701	100.00

Republican primary
Party	Candidate	Votes	%
Republican	Don Stenberg	94,394	49.99
Republican	Scott Moore	41,120	21.77
Republican	David Hergert	32,228	17.07
Republican	George Grogan	8,293	4.39
Republican	John DeCamp	7,469	3.96
Republican	Elliott Rustad	5,317	2.82
Republican	Write-ins	21	0.01
Total votes		188,842	100.00

General election
Party	Candidate	Votes	%	±%
Democratic	Ben Nelson	353,093	51.00	−3.78%
Republican	Don Stenberg	337,977	48.82	+3.81%
Write-ins		1,280	0.18	
Majority		15,116	2.18	−7.59%
Turnout		692,350		
Democratic hold		Swing		

== Nevada ==
Nevada election
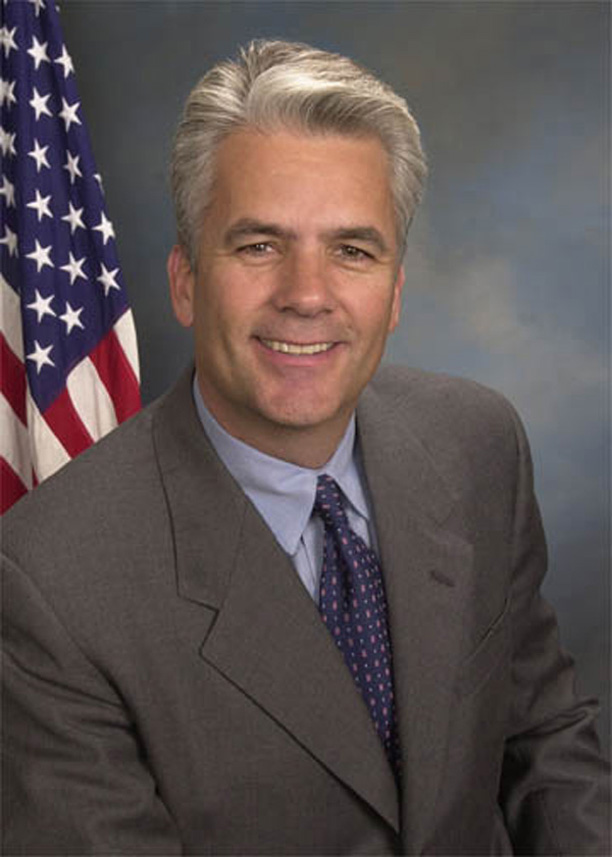

Nominee	John Ensign	Ed Bernstein
Party	Republican	Democratic
Popular vote	330,687	238,260
Percentage	55.1%	39.7%
- County results Ensign: 50–60% 60–70% 70–80% 80-90%
U.S. senator before election
Richard Bryan
Democratic
Elected U.S. senator
John Ensign
Republican

Incumbent Democrat Richard Bryan decided to retire, instead of seeking a third term. Republican nominee John Ensign won the open seat over Democratic attorney Ed Bernstein.

Republican primary
Party	Candidate	Votes	%
Republican	John Ensign	95,904	88.03
Republican	Richard Hamzik	6,202	5.69
Republican	None of these candidates	5,290	4.86
Republican	Fernando Platin, Jr.	1,543	1.42
Total votes		108,939	100.00

General election
Party	Candidate	Votes	%	±%
Republican	John Ensign	330,687	55.09	+14.09%
Democratic	Edward M. Bernstein	238,260	39.69	−11.24%
None of These Candidates		11,503	1.92	-1.40%
Green	Kathryn Rusco	10,286	1.71	
Libertarian	J. J. Johnson	5,395	0.90	−0.67%
Independent American	Ernie Berghof	2,540	0.42	−1.01%
Citizens First Party	Bill Grutzmacher	1,579	0.26	
Majority		92,427	15.40	+5.47%
Turnout		600,250		
Republican gain from Democratic				

== New Jersey ==
New Jersey election
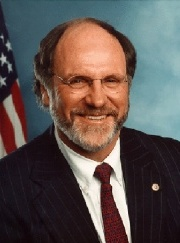

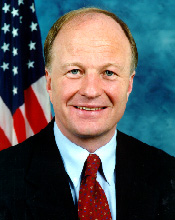
Nominee	Jon Corzine	Bob Franks
Party	Democratic	Republican
Popular vote	1,511,237	1,420,267
Percentage	50.1%	47.1%
- Corzine: 40-50% 50–60% 60–70% 70–80% Franks: 40-50% 50–60% 60–70%
U.S. senator before election
Frank Lautenberg
Democratic
Elected U.S. senator
Jon Corzine
Democratic

Incumbent Democrat Frank Lautenberg decided to retire, rather than seeking a fourth term. The Democratic nominee, former CEO of Goldman Sachs Jon Corzine, defeated the Republican nominee, U.S. Representative Bob Franks, in a close election.

Senator Lautenberg, first elected to the Senate in 1982 in an upset victory over Rep. Millicent Fenwick (R-Bergen), had always been an underdog in all three bids for Senate. He beat Pete Dawkins in 1988 by a 54%-46% margin and held back a challenge from Chuck Haytaian by a smaller margin of 50%-47%. However, popular Governor Christine Todd Whitman was expected to challenge Lautenberg, and opinion polls showed Lautenberg losing by a large margin. He retired but later regretted his decision because Gov. Whitman and Former Governor Tom Kean both declined to run for the Senate. Lautenberg would be elected to the state's other Senate Seat in 2002.

Corzine spent $35 million of his own money into the Democratic primary election alone when running against Jim Florio, who served as the 49th Governor of New Jersey from 1990 to 1994. Governor Florio was unpopular during his tenure in office. Most notably, he signed a $2.8 Billion tax increase in 1990. It caused his party to lose control of the state government for a decade, and cost the Governor his re-election bid in 1993.

Corzine, running as an outsider, was endorsed by State senator Raymond Zane (D-Gloucester), State senator Wayne Bryant (D-Camden), State senator John Adler (D-Camden), U.S. Representative Bob Menendez (D-Hudson) and U.S. senator Bob Torricelli (D-NJ). Florio was endorsed by the State Party, Assemblyman Joe Doria (D-Hudson) and senator John Lynch (D-Middlesex).

Corzine defeated Florio in the primary and then defeated Bob Franks in the general election.

2000 New Jersey U.S. Senate Democratic primary election
Party	Candidate	Votes	%	±%
Democratic	Jon Corzine	251,216	58.0	
Democratic	James Florio	182,212	42.0	

2000 New Jersey U.S. Senate Republican primary election
Party	Candidate	Votes	%	±%
Republican	Bob Franks	98,370	35.7	
Republican	William Gormley	94,010	34.1	
Republican	James W. Treffinger	48,674	17.7	
Republican	Murray Sabrin	34,629	12.6	

Franks, a moderate Republican, attacked Corzine for "trying to buy the election and of advocating big-government spending programs that the nation can ill afford". Corzine accused Franks of wanting to dismantle the Social Security system because he supported Governor George W. Bush's partial privatization plan.

During the campaign, Corzine refused to release his income tax return records. He claimed an interest in doing so, but he cited a confidentiality agreement with Goldman Sachs. Skeptics argued that he should have followed the example of his predecessor Robert Rubin, who converted his equity stake into debt upon leaving Goldman.

Corzine campaigned for state government programs including universal health care, universal gun registration, mandatory public preschool, and more taxpayer funding for college education. He pushed affirmative action and same-sex marriage. David Brooks considered Corzine so liberal that although his predecessor was also a Democrat, his election helped shift the Senate to the left.

During Corzine's campaign for the United States Senate, he made some controversial off-color statements. When introduced to a man with an Italian name who said he was in the construction business, Corzine quipped: "Oh, you make cement shoes!" according to Emanuel Alfano, chairman of the Italian-American One Voice Committee. Alfano also reported that when introduced to a lawyer named David Stein, Corzine said: "He's not Italian, is he? Oh, I guess he's your Jewish lawyer who is here to get the rest of you out of jail." Corzine denied mentioning religion, but did not deny the quip about Italians, claiming that some of his own ancestors were probably Italian, or maybe French.

Also in 2000, Corzine denied having paid off African-American ministers, when in fact the foundation controlled by him and his wife had paid one influential black church $25,000. Rev. Reginald T. Jackson, director of the Black Ministers Council, had campaigned against a form of racial profiling whereby police officers stop minority drivers and had gotten New Jersey state police superintendent, Carl A. Williams, fired. Corzine had donated to Jackson prior to getting what appears to be a reciprocal endorsement.

Franks generally trailed Corzine in the polls until the very last week, when he pulled even in a few polls. Corzine spent $63 million, while Franks spent only $6 million. Despite being heavily outspent, Franks lost by only three percentage points, doing better that year than Republican Governor George W. Bush in the presidential election, who obtained just 40% of the vote in the state.

General election
Party	Candidate	Votes	%	±%
Democratic	Jon Corzine	1,511,237	50.11	
Republican	Bob Franks	1,420,267	47.10	
Green	Bruce Afran	32,841	1.09	
Reform	Pat DiNizio	19,312	0.64	
Libertarian	Emerson Ellett	7,241	0.24	
Independent	Dennis A. Breen	6,061	0.20	
Trust in God	J. M. Carter	5,657	0.19	
Conservative	Lorraine LaNeve	3,836	0.13	
Socialist	Gregory Pason	3,365	0.11	
Socialist Workers	Nancy Rosenstock	3,309	0.11	
God Bless Jersey	George Gostigian	2,536	0.08	
Majority		90,970	3.01	
Turnout		3,015,662		
Democratic hold		Swing		

== New Mexico ==
New Mexico election
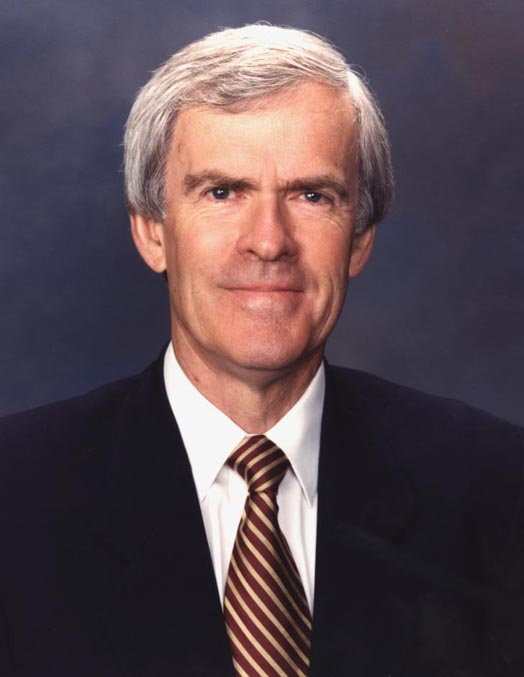

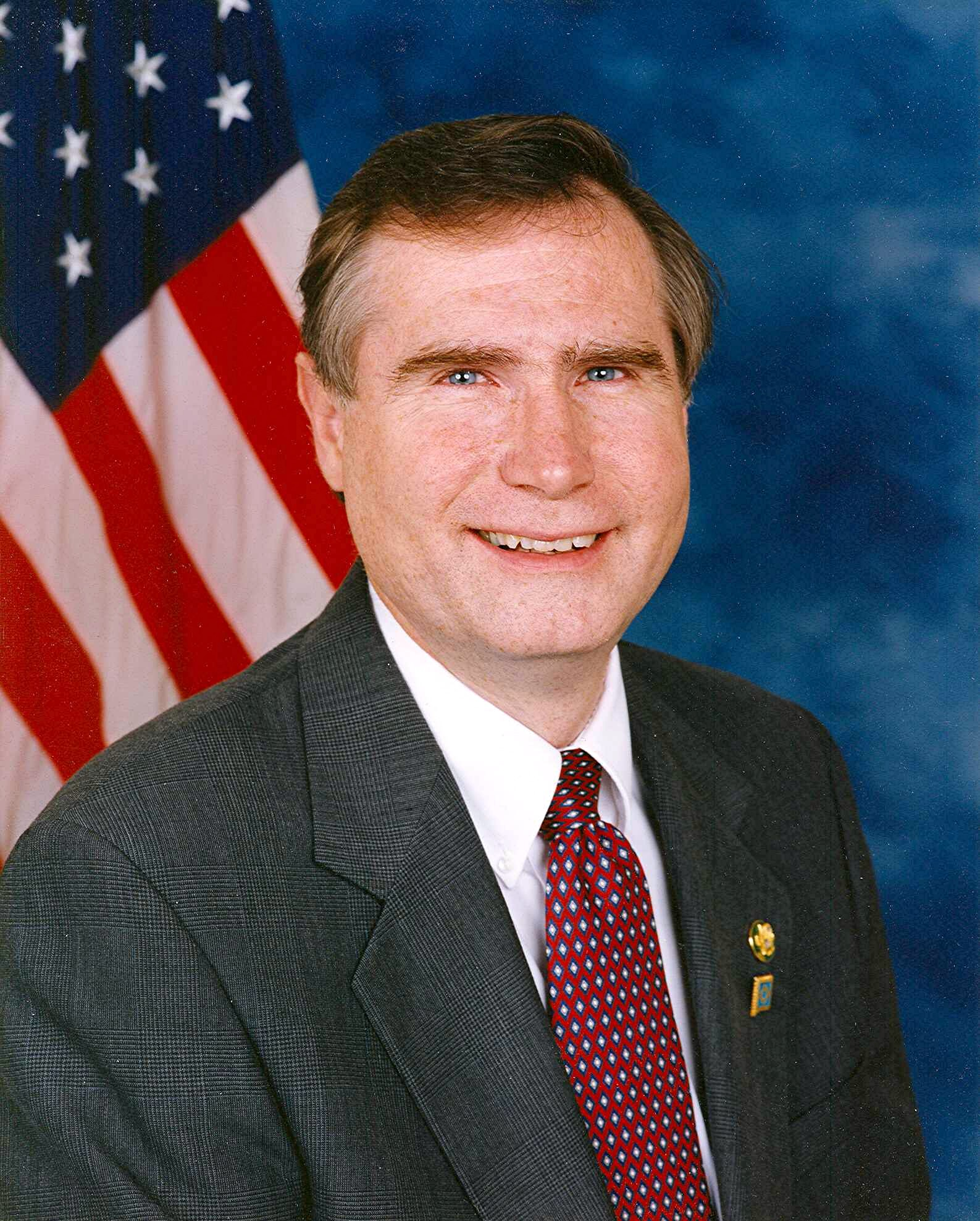
Nominee	Jeff Bingaman	Bill Redmond
Party	Democratic	Republican
Popular vote	363,744	225,517
Percentage	62.7%	37.3%
- County results Bingaman: 50–60% 60–70% 70–80% 80–90% Redmond: 50–60%
U.S. senator before election
Jeff Bingaman
Democratic
Elected U.S. senator
Jeff Bingaman
Democratic

Incumbent Democrat Jeff Bingaman won re-election to a fourth term, beating Republican former Congressman Bill Redmond.

Democratic primary
Party	Candidate	Votes	%
Democratic	Jeff Bingaman (Incumbent)	124,887	100.00
Total votes		124,887	100.00

Republican primary
Party	Candidate	Votes	%
Republican	Bill Redmond	43,780	60.39
Republican	Steve Pearce	15,628	21.56
Republican	William F. Davis	13,083	18.05
Total votes		72,491	100.00

General election
Party	Candidate	Votes	%	±%
Democratic	Jeff Bingaman (Incumbent)	363,744	61.70	+7.73%
Republican	Bill Redmond	225,517	38.25	−7.74%
Write-ins		265	0.04	
Majority		138,227	23.45	+15.47%
Turnout		589,525		
Democratic hold		Swing		

== New York ==
New York election
- November 7, 2000
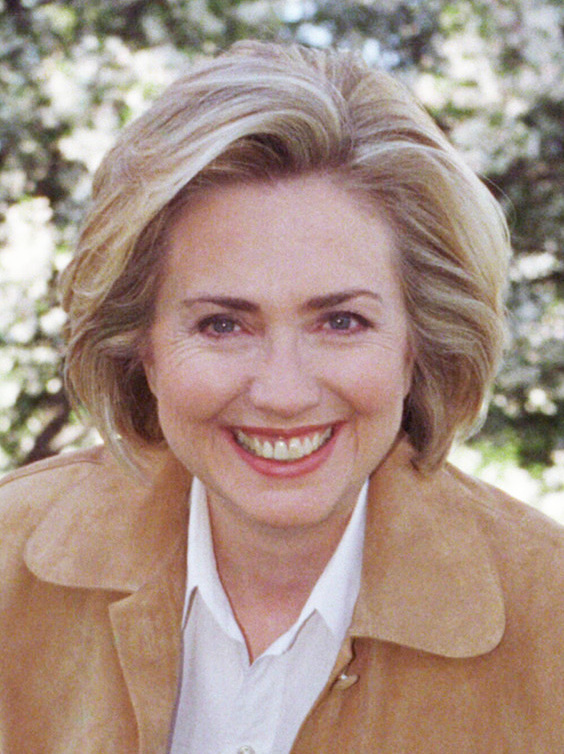

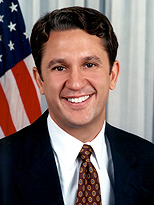
Nominee	Hillary Clinton	Rick Lazio
Party	Democratic	Republican
Popular vote	3,747,310	2,915,730
Percentage	55.3%	43.0%
- Results by county Clinton: 40-50% 50-60% 60-70% 70-80% 80-90% Lazio: 40-50% 50-60% 60-70%
U.S. senator before election
Daniel Patrick Moynihan
Democratic
Elected U.S. senator
Hillary Rodham Clinton
Democratic

Hillary Rodham Clinton, then First Lady of the United States and the first First Lady to run for political office, defeated Congressman Rick Lazio. The general election coincided with the U.S. presidential election.

The race began in November 1998 when four-term incumbent Daniel Patrick Moynihan (D) announced his retirement. Both the Democratic Party and Republican Party sought high-profile candidates to compete for the open seat. By early 1999 Clinton and Mayor of New York City Rudolph Giuliani were the likely respective nominees. Clinton and her husband, President Bill Clinton, purchased a house in Chappaqua, New York, in September 1999; she thereby became eligible for the election, although she faced characterizations of carpetbagging since she had never resided in the state before. The lead in statewide polls swung from Clinton to Giuliani and back to Clinton as the campaigns featured both successful strategies and mistakes as well as dealing with current events. In late April and May 2000, Giuliani's medical, romantic, marital, and political lives all collided in a tumultuous four-week period, culminating in his withdrawing from the race on May 19.

The Republicans chose lesser-known Congressman Rick Lazio to replace him. The election included a record $90 million in campaign expenditures between Clinton, Lazio, and Giuliani and national visibility. Clinton showed strength in normally Republican upstate areas and a debate blunder by Lazio solidified Clinton's previously shaky support among women.

Democratic primary
Party	Candidate	Votes	%
Democratic	Hillary Rodham Clinton	565,353	82
Democratic	Mark McMahon	124,315	18

The contest drew considerable national attention and both candidates were well-funded. By the end of the race, Democrat Clinton and Republicans Lazio and Giuliani had spent a combined $90 million, the most of any U.S. Senate race in history. Lazio outspent Clinton $40 million to $29 million, with Clinton also getting several million dollars in soft money from Democratic organizations. Among Clinton antagonists circles, direct mail-based fundraising groups such as the Emergency Committee to Stop Hillary Rodham Clinton sprung up, sending out solicitations regarding the "carpetbagging" issue: just as one Clinton leaves office, another one runs.

Clinton secured a broad base of support, including endorsements from conservation groups and organized labor, but notably not the New York City police union which endorsed Lazio while firefighters supported Clinton. While Clinton had a solid base of support in New York City, candidates and observers expected the race to be decided in upstate New York where 45 percent of the state's voters live. During the campaign, Clinton vowed to improve the economic picture in upstate New York, promising that her plan would deliver 200,000 New York jobs over six years. Her plan included specific tax credits with the purpose of rewarding job creation and encouraging business investment, especially in the high-tech sector. She called for targeted personal tax cuts for college tuition and long-term care. Lazio faced a unique tactical problem campaigning upstate. The major issue there was the persistently weak local economy, which Lazio hoped to link to his opponent's husband's tenure in office. Attacks on the state of the upstate economy were frequently interpreted as criticism of incumbent Republican governor George Pataki, however, limiting the effect of this line of attack.

Opponents continued to make the carpetbagging issue a focal point throughout the race and during debates. Talk radio hammered on this, with New York-based Sean Hannity issuing a daily mantra, "Name me three things Hillary Clinton has ever done for the people of New York!" Clinton's supporters pointed out that the state was receptive to national leaders, such as Robert F. Kennedy who was elected to the Senate in 1964 despite similar accusations. In the end, according to exit polls conducted in the race, a majority of the voters dismissed the carpetbagging issue as unimportant.

During the campaign, Independent Counsel Robert Ray filed his final reports regarding the long-running Whitewater, "Travelgate", and "Filegate" investigations of the White House, each of which included specific investigations of Hillary Clinton actions. The reports exonerated her on the files matter, said there was insufficient evidence regarding her role in Whitewater, and said that she had made factually false statements regarding the Travel Office firings but there was insufficient evidence to prosecute her. Although The New York Times editorialized that the release of the reports seemed possibly timed to coincide with the Senate election, in practice the findings were not seen as likely to sway many voters' opinions.

A September 13, 2000, debate between Lazio and Clinton proved important. Lazio was on the warpath against soft money and the amounts of it coming from the Democratic National Committee into Clinton's campaign, and challenged Clinton to agree to ban soft money from both campaigns. He left his podium and waved his proposed paper agreement in Clinton's face; many debate viewers thought he had invaded her personal space and as a result Clinton's support among women voters solidified.

Late in the campaign Lazio criticised Clinton for accepting campaign donations from various Arab groups in the wake of the USS Cole attack. This issue caused former New York Mayor Ed Koch to take out ads telling Lazio to "stop with the sleaze already", and did not change the dynamic of the race.

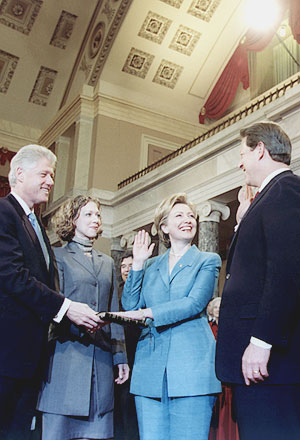
Having won the election, Clinton is sworn in as the junior senator from New York, January 3, 2001.

General election
Party	Candidate	Votes	%	±%
Democratic	Hillary Rodham Clinton	3,562,415		
Working Families	Hillary Rodham Clinton	102,094		
Liberal	Hillary Rodham Clinton	82,801		
total	Hillary Rodham Clinton	3,747,310	55.27	+0.02
Republican	Rick Lazio	2,724,589		
Conservative	Rick Lazio	191,141		
total	Rick Lazio	2,915,730	43.01	+1.5
Independence	Jeffrey Graham	43,181	0.64	−0.08
Green	Mark Dunau	40,991	0.60	
Right to Life	John Adefope	21,439	0.32	−1.68
Libertarian	John Clifton	4,734	0.07	−0.31
Constitution	Louis Wein	3,414	0.05	
Socialist Workers	Jacob Perasso	3,040	0.04	−0.27
Blank/scattering		179,823		
Majority		831,580	12.27	
Turnout		6,779,839		
Democratic hold		Swing		

Per New York State law, Clinton and Lazio totals include their minor party line votes: Liberal Party of New York and Working Families Party for Clinton, Conservative Party for Lazio.

Clinton won the election on November 7 with 55 percent of the vote to Lazio's 43 percent, a difference larger than most observers had expected. Clinton won the traditionally Democratic base of New York City by large margins, and carried suburban Westchester County, but lost heavily populated Long Island, part of which Lazio represented in Congress. She won surprising victories in Upstate counties, such as Cayuga, Rensselaer, and Niagara, to which her win has been attributed.

In comparison with other results, this 12 percentage point margin was smaller than Gore's 25 point margin over Bush in the state Presidential contest, was slightly larger than the 10 point margin by which fellow New York senator Charles Schumer defeated incumbent Republican Al D'Amato in the hotly contested 1998 race, but was considerably smaller than the 47 point margin by which senator Schumer won re-election in 2004 against little-known Republican challenger Howard Mills. The victory of a Democrat in the Senate election was not assured, because in recent decades the Republicans had won about half the elections for governor and senator.

Lazio's bid was handicapped by the weak performance of George W. Bush in New York in the 2000 election, but it was also clear Hillary Clinton had made substantial inroads in upstate New York prior to Lazio's entry into the race. Exit polls also showed a large gender gap with Clinton running stronger than expected among moderate women and unaffiliated women.

== North Dakota ==
North Dakota election
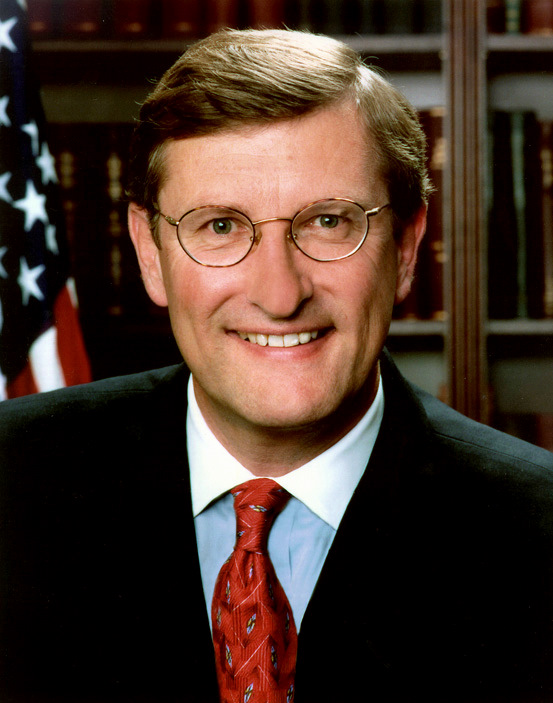

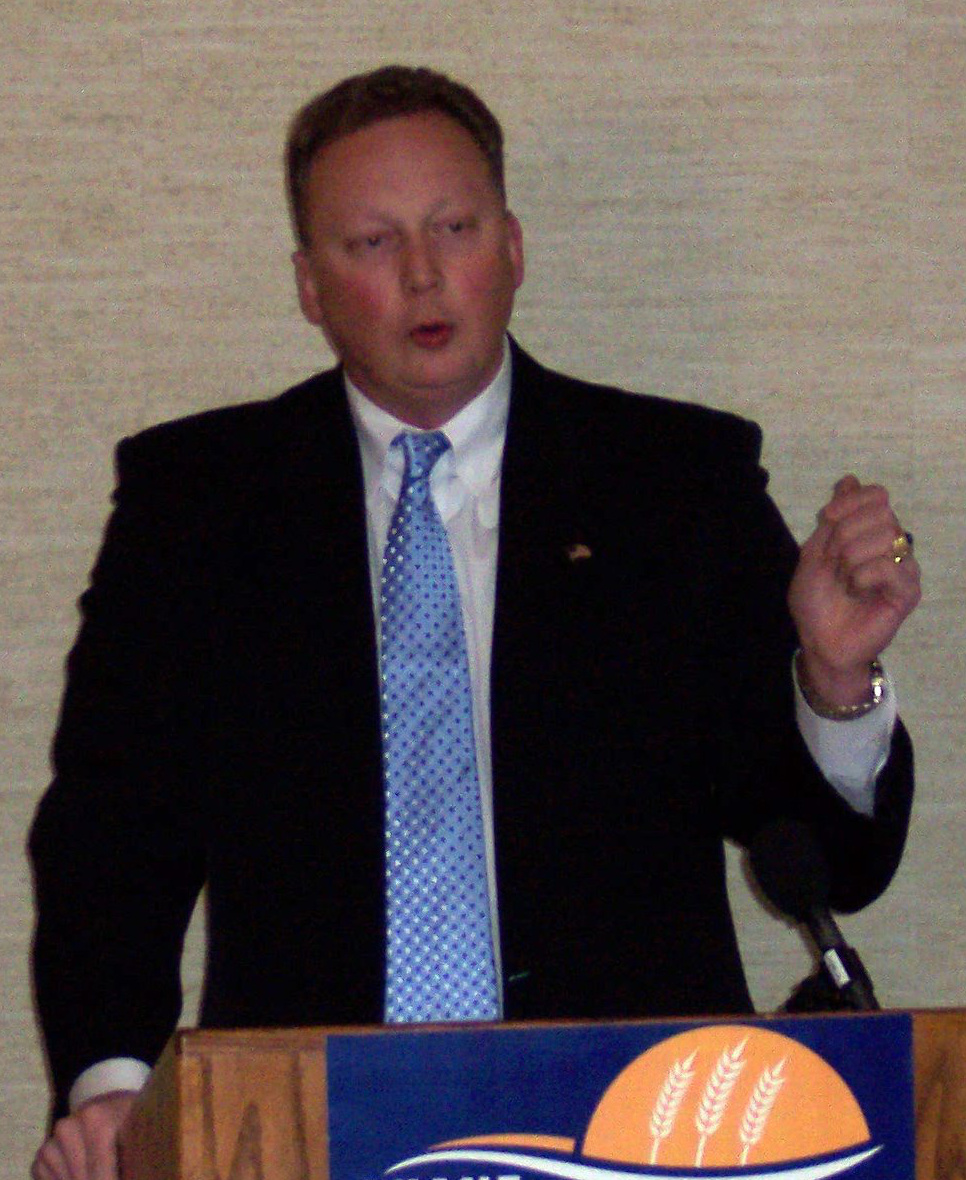
Nominee	Kent Conrad	Duane Sand
Party	Democratic–NPL	Republican
Popular vote	176,470	111,069
Percentage	61.4%	38.6%
- County results Conrad: 50–60% 60–70% 70–80% 80–90% Sand: 50–60%
U.S. senator before election
Kent Conrad
Democratic–NPL
Elected U.S. senator
Kent Conrad
Democratic–NPL

Incumbent Dem-NPL U.S. senator Kent Conrad won re-election to a third term, over Republican Naval Reserve officer Duane Sand.

General election
Party	Candidate	Votes	%	±%
Democratic–NPL	Kent Conrad (Incumbent)	176,470	61.37	
Republican	Duane Sand	111,069	38.63	
Majority		65,401	22.74	
Turnout		287,539	100	

== Ohio ==
Ohio election
- Turnout: 63.6% (Registered Voters)
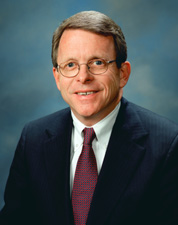

Nominee	Mike DeWine	Ted Celeste
Party	Republican	Democratic
Popular vote	2,665,512	1,595,066
Percentage	59.9%	35.9%
- County results DeWine: 40–50% 50–60% 60–70% 70–80% Celeste: 40–50% 50–60%
U.S. senator before election
Mike DeWine
Republican
Elected U.S. senator
Mike DeWine
Republican

Incumbent Republican Mike DeWine won re-election to a second term, beating Democrat Ted Celeste, real estate developer and brother of former Ohio Governor Dick Celeste.

Republican primary
Party	Candidate	Votes	%
Republican	Mike DeWine (Incumbent)	1,029,860	79.51
Republican	Ronald Richard Dickson	161,185	12.44
Republican	Frank Cremeans	104,219	8.05
Total votes		1,295,264	100

Democratic primary
Party	Candidate	Votes	%
Democratic	Ted Celeste	375,205	43.86
Democratic	Marvin McMickle	208,291	24.35
Democratic	Richard Cordray	202,345	23.65
Democratic	Dan Radakovich	69,620	8.14
Total votes		855,461	100

General election
Party	Candidate	Votes	%	±%
Republican	Mike DeWine (Incumbent)	2,665,512	59.9	+6.5%
Democratic	Ted Celeste	1,595,066	35.9	−3.3%
Libertarian	John McAlister	116,724	2.6	0.00%
Natural Law Party (US)	John Eastman	70,713	1.6	0.00%
Write-in		786	0.00	0.00%
Majority		1,076,446		
Turnout		4,448,801	63.6	
Republican hold		Swing		

== Pennsylvania ==
Pennsylvania election
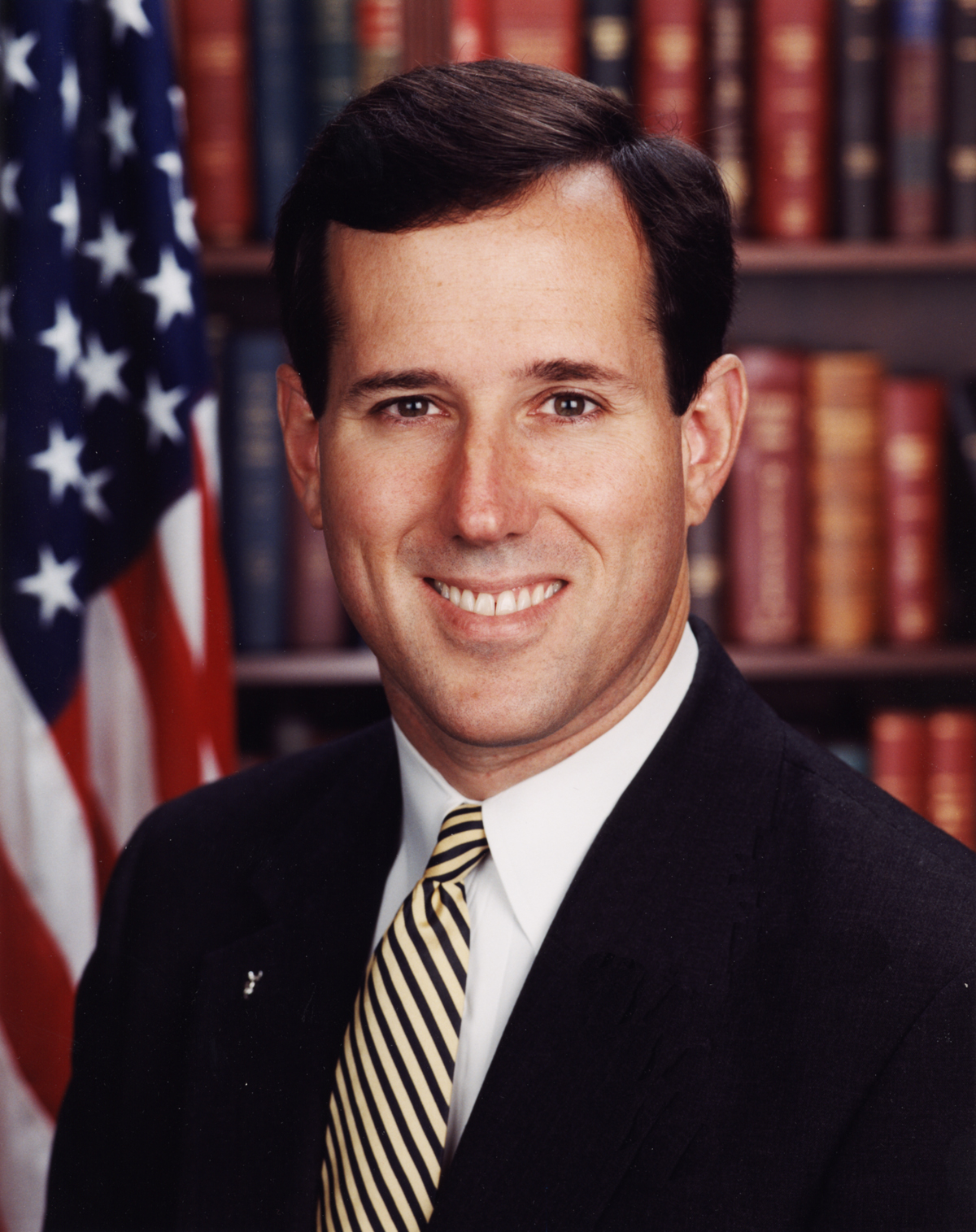

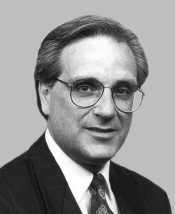
Nominee	Rick Santorum	Ron Klink
Party	Republican	Democratic
Popular vote	2,481,962	2,154,908
Percentage	52.4%	45.5%
- Santorum: 40–50% 50–60% 60–70% 70–80% Klink: 50–60% 70–80%
U.S. senator before election
Rick Santorum
Republican
Elected U.S. senator
Rick Santorum
Republican

Incumbent Republican Rick Santorum won re-election to a second term over Democratic Congressman Ron Klink.

Santorum had gained a reputation as a polarizing figure during his first term in the Senate, but he entered the race with a large fundraising advantage and high levels of support from the political right. The contest began for Democrats with a brutal primary challenge; U.S. Congressman Klink narrowly bested State senator Allyson Schwartz and former Lieutenant Governor nominee Tom Foley by running on the message that he was the only candidate capable of defeating the Republican. Klink was viewed as a viable choice because he was a traditional Democrat on most issues and had strong union ties but also was pro-life, which Democrats hoped would return votes to their party in the heavily Catholic but economically liberal coal regions of the state. However, enthusiasm around Klink's campaign quickly waned. Liberal Democrats, particularly in the Philadelphia area, balked at donating to a socially conservative candidate who was almost unknown in their area. He was also badly outspent, leaving him unable to expand his presence in the state; he didn't run a single ad on Philadelphia television. Santorum, in contrast, successfully balanced his national recognition on social issues with local concerns en route to a surprisingly large victory.

General election
Party	Candidate	Votes	%	±%
Republican	Rick Santorum (Incumbent)	2,481,962	52.4	+3.0%
Democratic	Ron Klink	2,154,908	45.5	−8.6%
Libertarian	John Featherman	45,775	1.0	−0.7%
Constitution	Lester Searer	28,382	0.6	+0.6%
Reform	Robert Domske	24,089	0.5	+0.5%
Majority		327,054	6.9	+4.4%
Total votes		4,735,116	100	

== Rhode Island ==
Rhode Island election
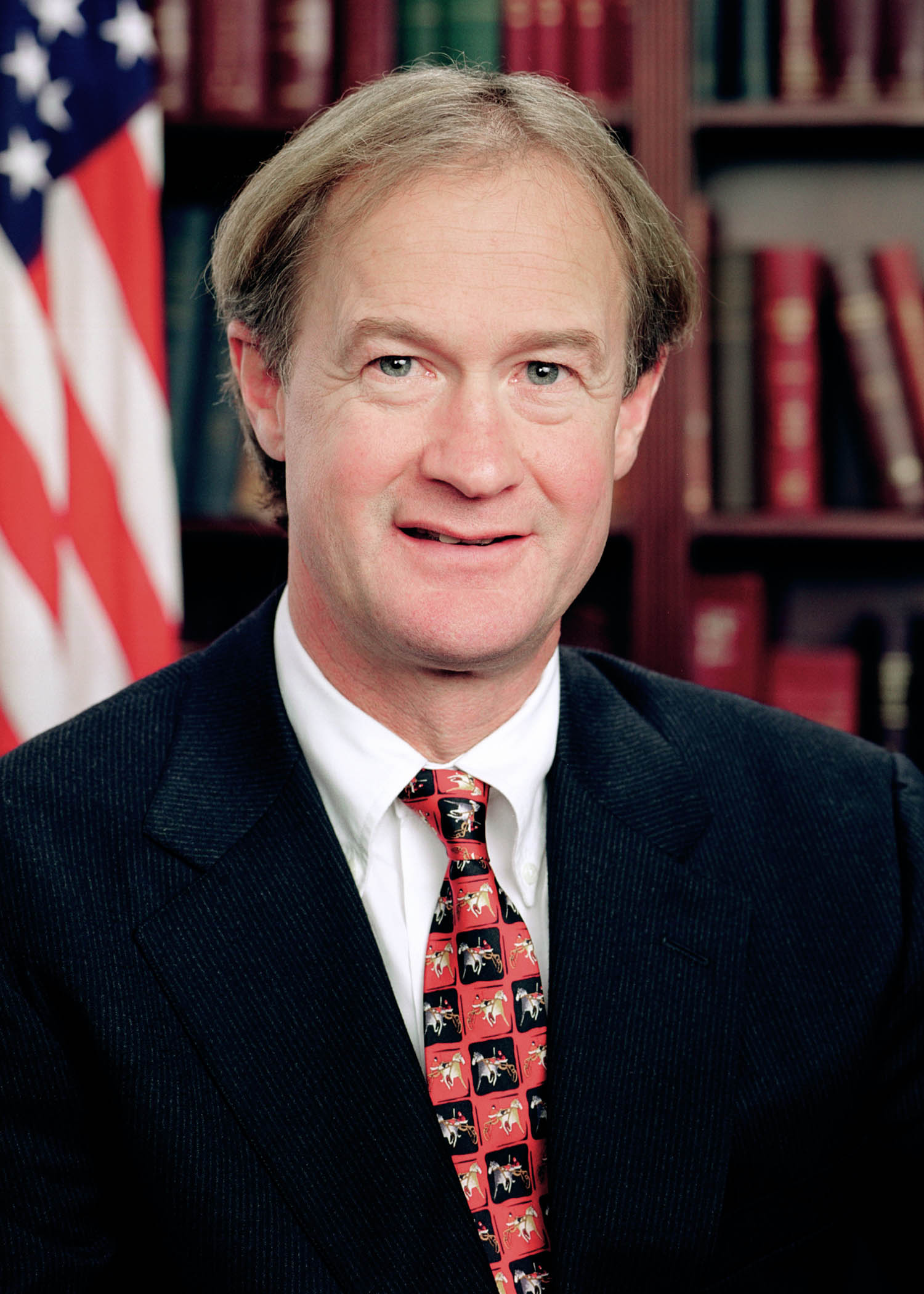

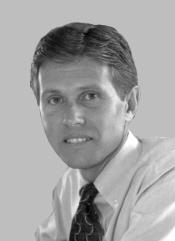
Nominee	Lincoln Chafee	Robert Weygand
Party	Republican	Democratic
Popular vote	222,588	161,023
Percentage	56.88%	41.15%
- Chafee: 40–50% 50–60% 60–70% 70–80% Weygand: 50–60%
U.S. senator before election
Lincoln Chafee
Republican
Elected U.S. senator
Lincoln Chafee
Republican

Incumbent Republican Lincoln Chafee was elected his first full term after being appointed in 1999 to fill the seat of his father, the previous Senator, John Chafee who died on October 24, 1999, a few months after the elder Chafee announced his retirement instead of seeking a fifth term. As of 2022, this is the last Senate election in Rhode Island won by a Republican.

Democratic primary
Party	Candidate	Votes	%
Democratic	Robert Weygand	51,769	57.49
Democratic	Richard A. Licht	38,281	42.51
Total votes		90,050	100.00

Republican primary
Party	Candidate	Votes	%
Republican	Lincoln Chafee (Incumbent)	2,221	100.00
Total votes		2,221	100.00

General election
Party	Candidate	Votes	%	±%
Republican	Lincoln Chafee (Incumbent)	222,588	56.88	−7.65%
Democratic	Robert Weygand	161,023	41.15	+5.67%
Reform	Christopher Young	4,107	1.05	
Independent	Kenneth Proulx	3,635	0.93	
Majority		61,565	15.73	−13.32%
Turnout		391,353		
Republican hold		Swing		

== Tennessee ==
Tennessee election
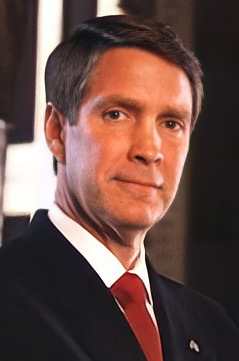

Nominee	Bill Frist	Jeff Clark
Party	Republican	Democratic
Popular vote	1,255,444	621,152
Percentage	65.1%	32.2%
- County results Frist: 40–50% 50–60% 60–70% 70–80% 80–90% Clark: 50–60%
U.S. senator before election
Bill Frist
Republican
Elected U.S. senator
Bill Frist
Republican

Incumbent Republican Bill Frist won re-election to a second term.

The Democratic primary was held August 3, 2000. In a field of five candidates, Jeff Clark, a professor at Middle Tennessee State University, edged out John Jay Hooker to win the nomination.

Democratic primary
Party	Candidate	Votes	%
Democratic	Jeff Clark	64,851	34.23%
Democratic	John Jay Hooker	64,041	33.81%
Democratic	Mary Taylor-Shelby	28,604	15.10%
Democratic	Shannon Wood	25,372	13.39%
Democratic	James Looney	6,354	3.35%
Democratic	Write-ins	218	0.12%
Total votes		189,440	100.00%

Republican primary
Party	Candidate	Votes	%
Republican	Bill Frist (Incumbent)	186,882	100.00
Total votes		186,882	100.00

General election
Party	Candidate	Votes	%	±%
Republican	Bill Frist (Incumbent)	1,255,444	65.10%	+8.75%
Democratic	Jeff Clark	621,152	32.21%	−9.89%
Green	Tom Burrell	25,815	1.34%	N/A
Independent	Charles F. Johnson	10,004	0.52%	+0.07
Independent	Robert Watson	8,416	0.44%	N/A
Independent	David Jarrod Ownby	4,388	0.23%	N/A
Independent	Joel Kinstle	3,135	0.16%	N/A
Write-in		259	0.00%	N/A
Majority		634,292	32.89%	N/A
Republican hold				

== Texas ==
Texas election
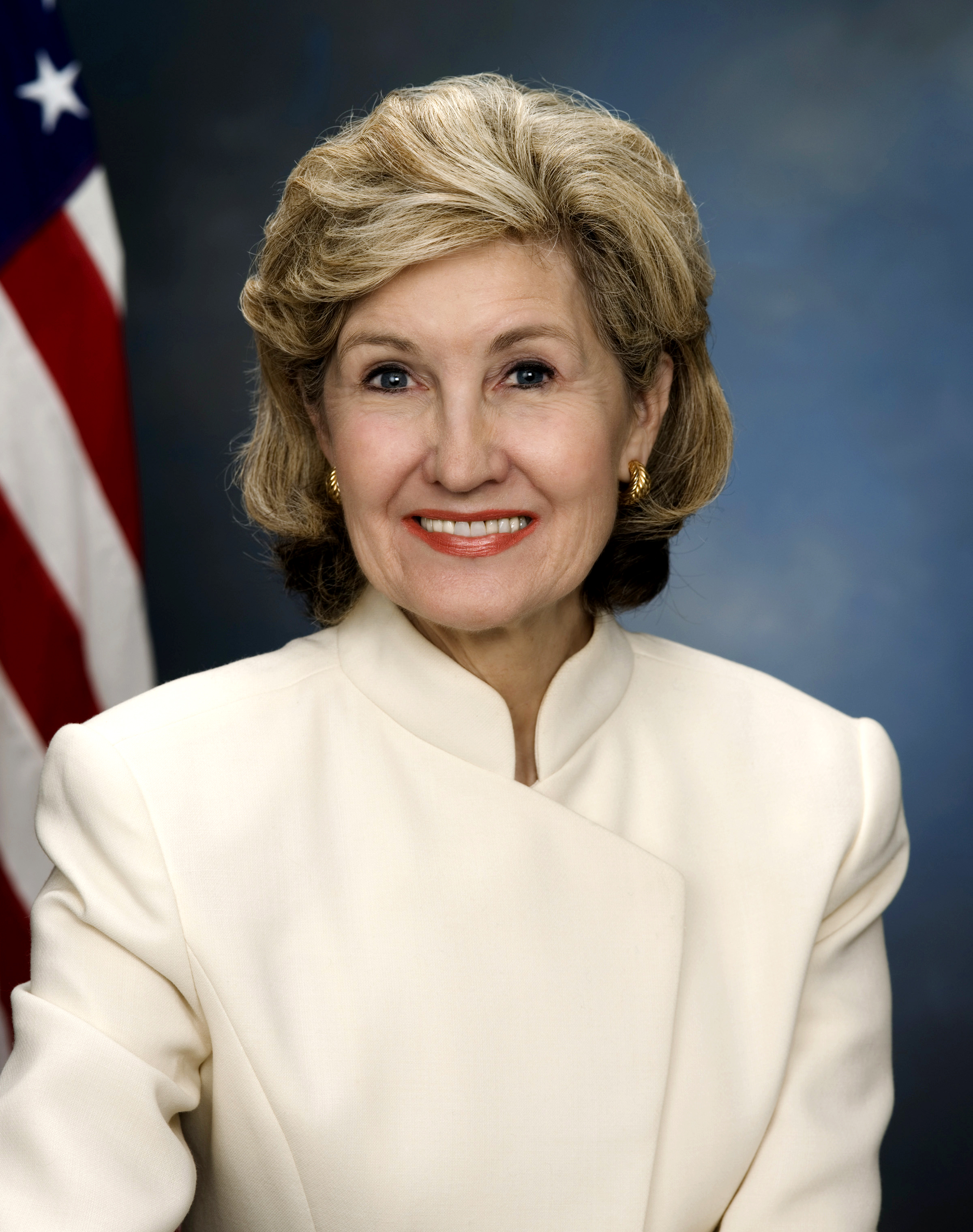

Nominee	Kay Bailey Hutchison	Gene Kelly
Party	Republican	Democratic
Popular vote	4,078,954	2,025,024
Percentage	65.0%	32.4%
- County results Hutchison: 40–50% 50–60% 60–70% 70–80% 80–90% >90% Kelly: 40-50% 50–60% 60–70% 70–80% 80–90%
U.S. senator before election
Kay Bailey Hutchison
Republican
Elected U.S. senator
Kay Bailey Hutchison
Republican

Incumbent Republican Kay Bailey Hutchison won re-election to a second term, beating Democrat Gene Kelly, a retired attorney.

General election
Party	Candidate	Votes	%	±%
Republican	Kay Bailey Hutchison (Incumbent)	4,078,954	65.08%	+4.23%
Democratic	Gene Kelly	2,025,024	32.31%	−6.00%
Green	Douglas S. Sandage	91,329	1.46%	N/A
Libertarian	Mary J. Ruwart	72,657	1.16%	+0.32%
Majority		2,053,930	32.77%	+10.23%
Turnout		6,267,964		
Republican hold				

== Utah ==
Utah election
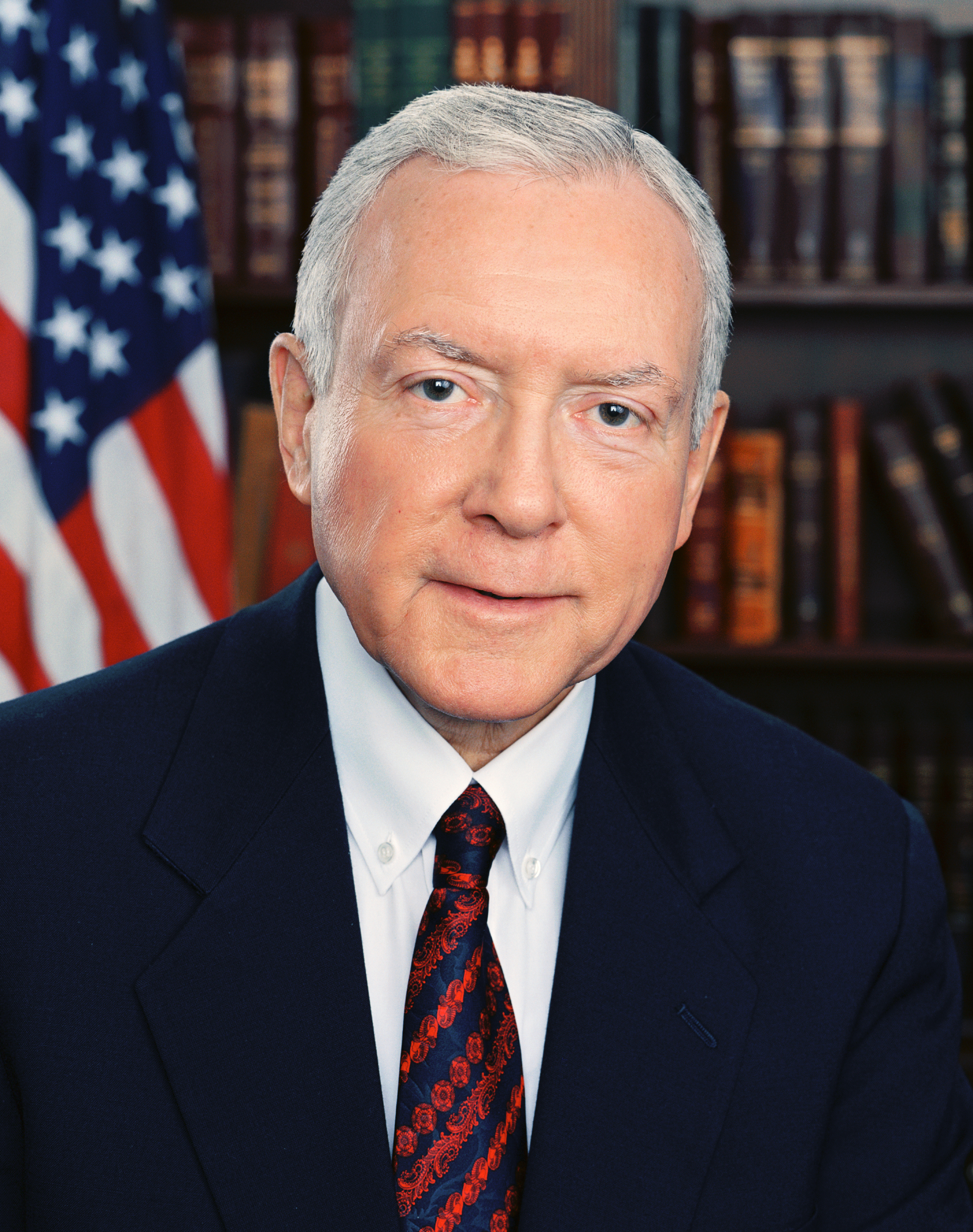

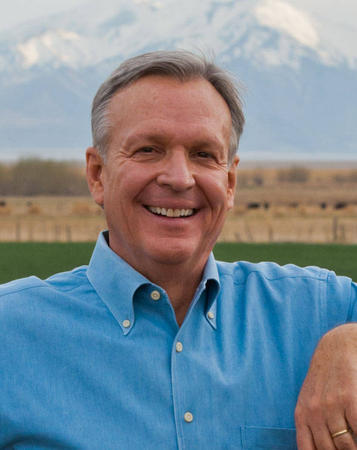
Nominee	Orrin Hatch	Scott Howell
Party	Republican	Democratic
Popular vote	504,803	242,569
Percentage	65.6%	31.5%
- County results Hatch: 40-50% 50-60% 60-70% 70-80% 80-90%
U.S. senator before election
Orrin Hatch
Republican
Elected U.S. senator
Orrin Hatch
Republican

Incumbent Republican Orrin Hatch won re-election to a fifth term, beating Democratic State senator Scott N. Howell.

General election
Party	Candidate	Votes	%	±%
Republican	Orrin Hatch	504,803	65.58	−3.22%
Democratic	Scott N. Howell	242,569	31.51	+3.22%
Independent American	Carlton Edward Bowen	11,938	1.55	+1.27%
Libertarian	Jim Dexter	10,394	1.35	
Majority		262,234	34.07	−6.44%
Turnout		769,704		
Republican hold		Swing		

== Vermont ==
Vermont election
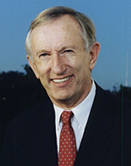

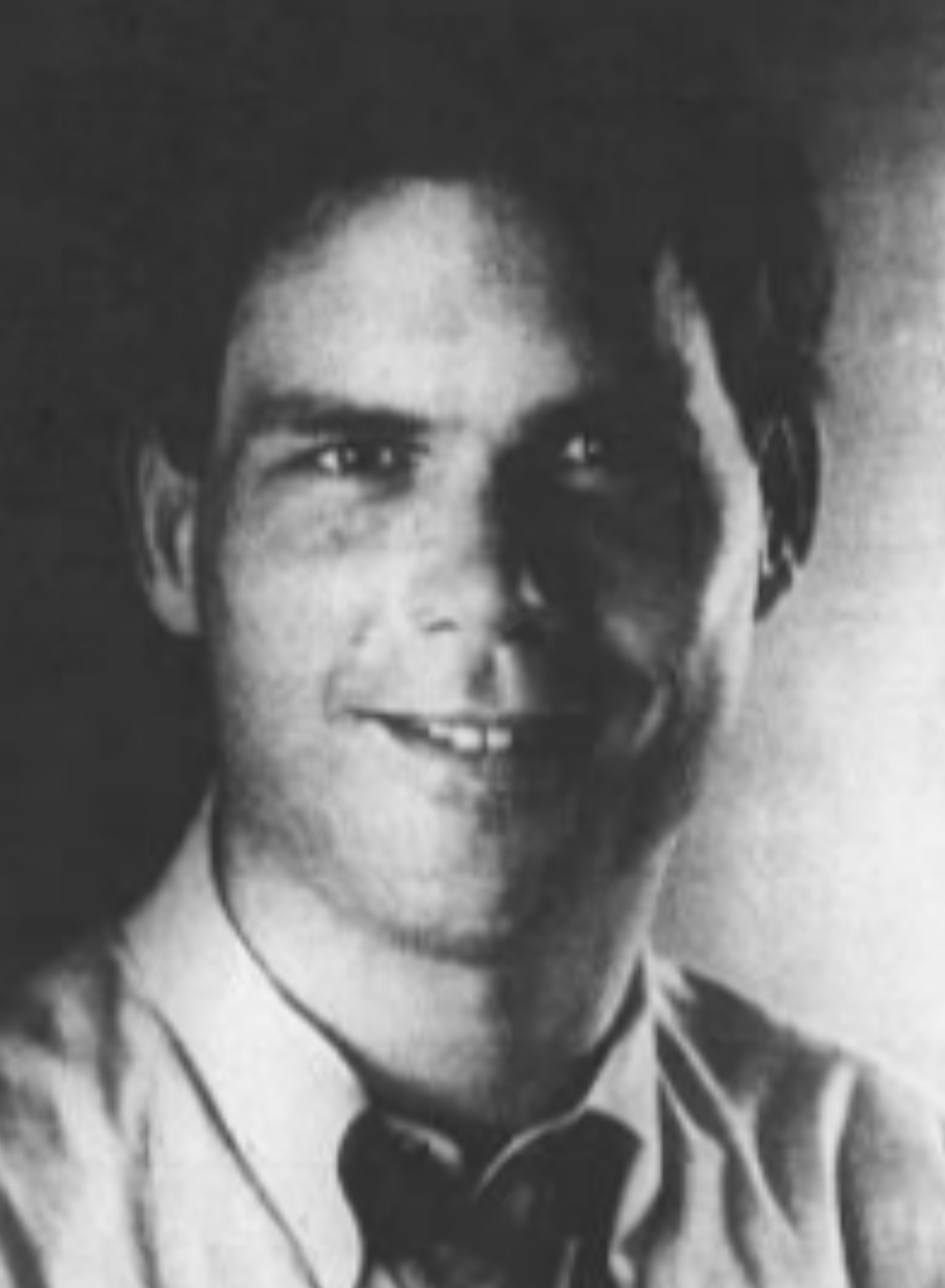
Nominee	Jim Jeffords	Ed Flanagan
Party	Republican	Democratic
Popular vote	189,133	73,352
Percentage	65.6%	25.4%
- Jeffords: 40–50% 50–60% 60–70% 70–80%
U.S. senator before election
Jim Jeffords
Republican
Elected U.S. senator
Jim Jeffords
Independent

Incumbent Republican Jim Jeffords won re-election to a third term in office, over Ed Flanagan, Vermont Auditor of Accounts. Jeffords switched from being a Republican to an independent, who would later caucus with the Democratic Party following the 2000 election in May 2001, thus breaking the 50-50 lock. As of 2022, this is the last Senate election in Vermont won by a Republican.

Democratic primary
Party	Candidate	Votes	%
Democratic	Ed Flanagan	17,440	49.24
Democratic	Jan Backus	16,444	46.43
Democratic	Write-ins	1,533	4.33
Total votes		30,229	100.00

Republican primary
Party	Candidate	Votes	%
Republican	Jim Jeffords (Incumbent)	60,234	77.79
Republican	Rick Hubbard	15,991	20.65
Republican	Write-ins	1,204	1.55
Total votes		77,429	100.00

General election
Party	Candidate	Votes	%	±%
Republican	Jim Jeffords (Incumbent)	189,133	65.56	+15.24%
Democratic	Ed Flanagan	73,352	25.43	−15.14%
Constitution	Charles W. Russell	10,079	3.49	
Independent	Rick Hubbard	5,366	1.86	
Grassroots	Billy Greer	4,889	1.69	
Libertarian	Hugh Douglas	3,843	1.33	
Liberty Union	Jerry Levy	1,477	0.51	
Write-ins		361	0.13	
Majority		115,781	40.13	+30.38%
Turnout		288,500		
Republican hold		Swing		

== Virginia ==
Virginia election
- Turnout: 54.0% (voting eligible)
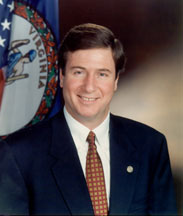

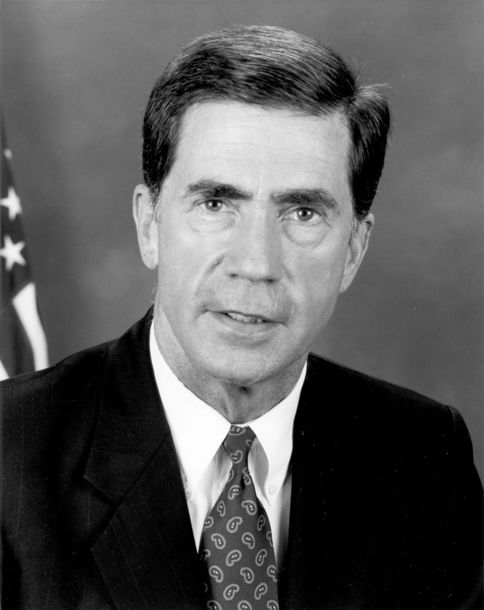
Nominee	George Allen	Chuck Robb
Party	Republican	Democratic
Popular vote	1,420,460	1,296,093
Percentage	52.26%	47.68%
- County and independent city results Allen: 50–60% 60–70% 70–80% Robb: 50–60% 60–70% 70–80%
U.S. senator before election
Chuck Robb
Democratic
Elected U.S. senator
George Allen
Republican

Incumbent Democrat Chuck Robb ran for a third term, but lost to Republican George Allen.

General election
Party	Candidate	Votes	%	±%
Republican	George Allen	1,420,460	52.26	+9.38%
Democratic	Chuck Robb (Incumbent)	1,296,093	47.68	+2.07%
Write-ins		1,748	0.06	−0.01%
Majority		124,367	4.58	+1.85%
Turnout		2,718,301		
Republican gain from Democratic				

== Washington ==
Washington election
- Turnout: 75.46%
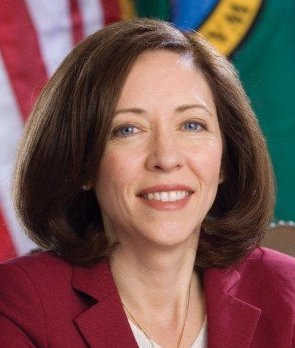

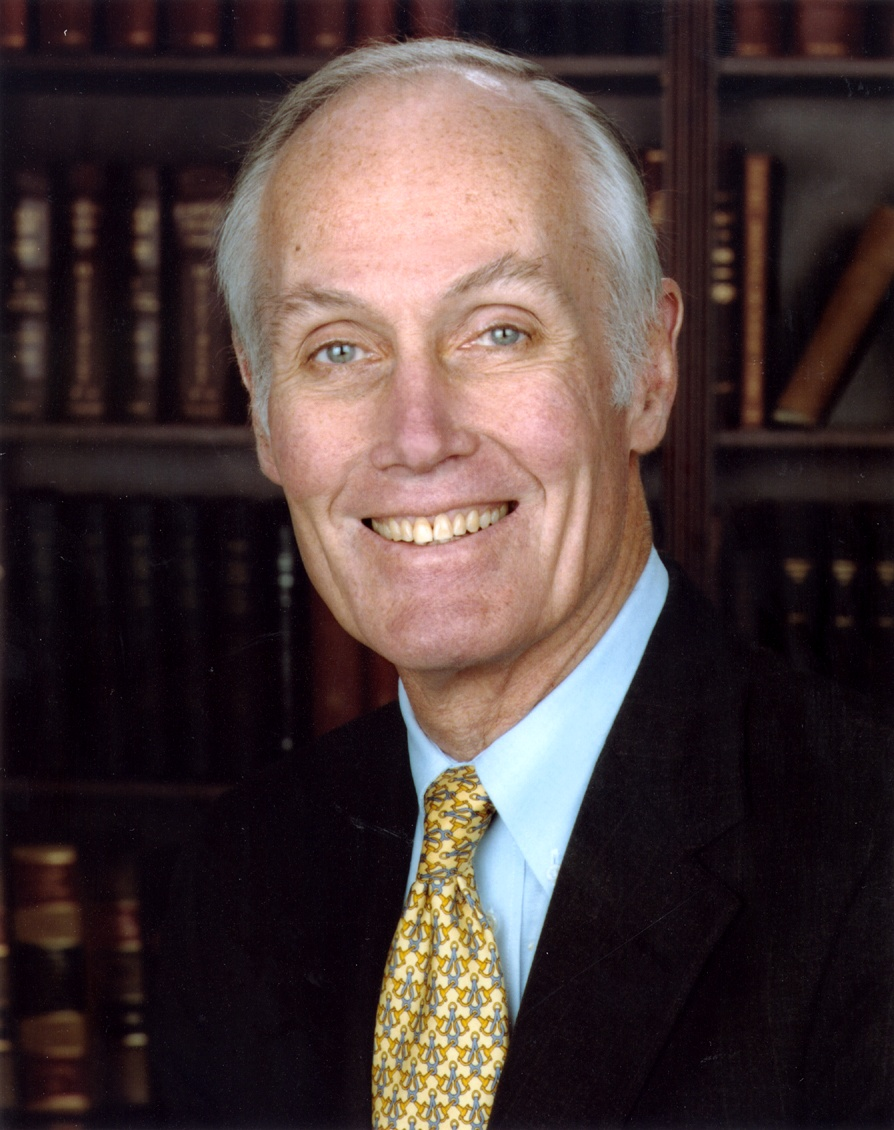
Nominee	Maria Cantwell	Slade Gorton
Party	Democratic	Republican
Popular vote	1,199,437	1,197,208
Percentage	48.7%	48.6%
- County results Cantwell: 40–50% 50–60% Gorton: 40–50% 50–60% 60–70%
U.S. senator before election
Slade Gorton
Republican
Elected U.S. senator
Maria Cantwell
Democratic

Incumbent Republican Slade Gorton ran for a third consecutive term (fourth overall), but was unseated for a second time (the first being 1986) by Democratic candidate, former Congresswoman Maria Cantwell.

Since Maria Cantwell had only won by 1,953 votes, or a margin of 0.08 percent, an automatic recount was triggered. Cantwell won the recount on December 1 with a margin of 2,229 votes (0.09%) in one of the closest elections in Washington state history.

General election
Party	Candidate	Votes	%	±%
Democratic	Maria Elaine Cantwell	1,199,437	48.73	+4.48%
Republican	Slade Gorton (Incumbent)	1,197,208	48.64	−7.11%
Libertarian	Jeff Jared	64,734	2.63	+2.6%
Plurality		2,229		
Turnout		2,461,379	100	+761,206

== West Virginia ==
West Virginia election
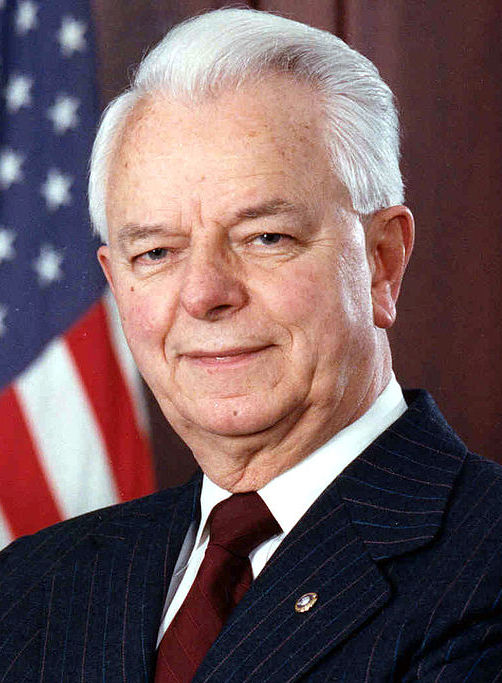

Nominee	Robert Byrd	David Gallaher
Party	Democratic	Republican
Popular vote	469,215	121,635
Percentage	77.8%	20.2%
- County results Byrd: 60–70% 70–80% 80–90%
U.S. senator before election
Robert Byrd
Democratic
Elected U.S. senator
Robert Byrd
Democratic

Incumbent Democrat Robert Byrd won re-election to an eighth term. He won every county and congressional district in the state.

General election
Party	Candidate	Votes	%	±%
Democratic	Robert Byrd (Incumbent)	469,215	77.8	
Republican	David T. Gallaher	121,635	20.2	
Libertarian	Joe Whelan	12,627	2.1	
Majority				
Turnout				
Democratic hold		Swing		

== Wisconsin ==
Wisconsin election
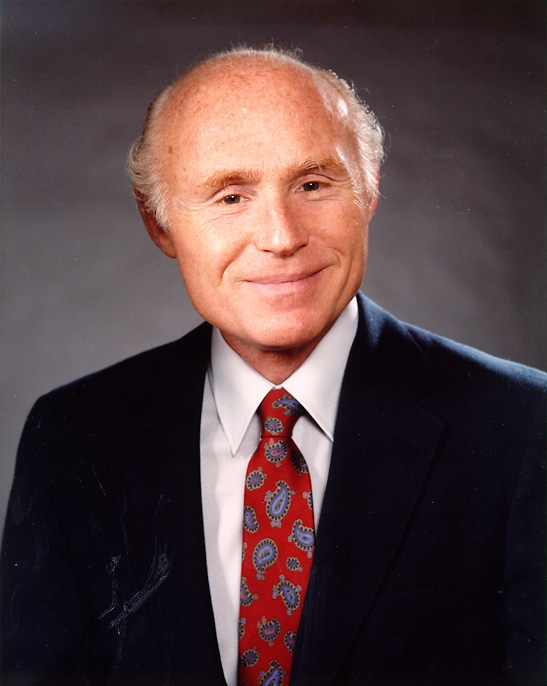

Nominee	Herb Kohl	John Gillespie
Party	Democratic	Republican
Popular vote	1,563,238	940,744
Percentage	61.5%	37.0%
- Kohl: 50–60% 60–70% 70–80% Gillespie: 40–50% 50–60%
U.S. senator before election
Herb Kohl
Democratic
Elected U.S. senator
Herb Kohl
Democratic

Incumbent Democrat Herb Kohl won re-election to a third term.

General election
Party	Candidate	Votes	%	±%
Democratic	Herb Kohl (Incumbent)	1,563,238	61.5	
Republican	John Gillespie	940,744	37.0	
Libertarian	Tim Peterson	21,348	0.8	
Independent	Eugene A. Hem	9,555	0.4	
Constitution	Robert R. Raymond	4,296	0.2	
Independent	Write-ins	902	0.0	
Democratic hold		Swing		

== Wyoming ==
Wyoming election
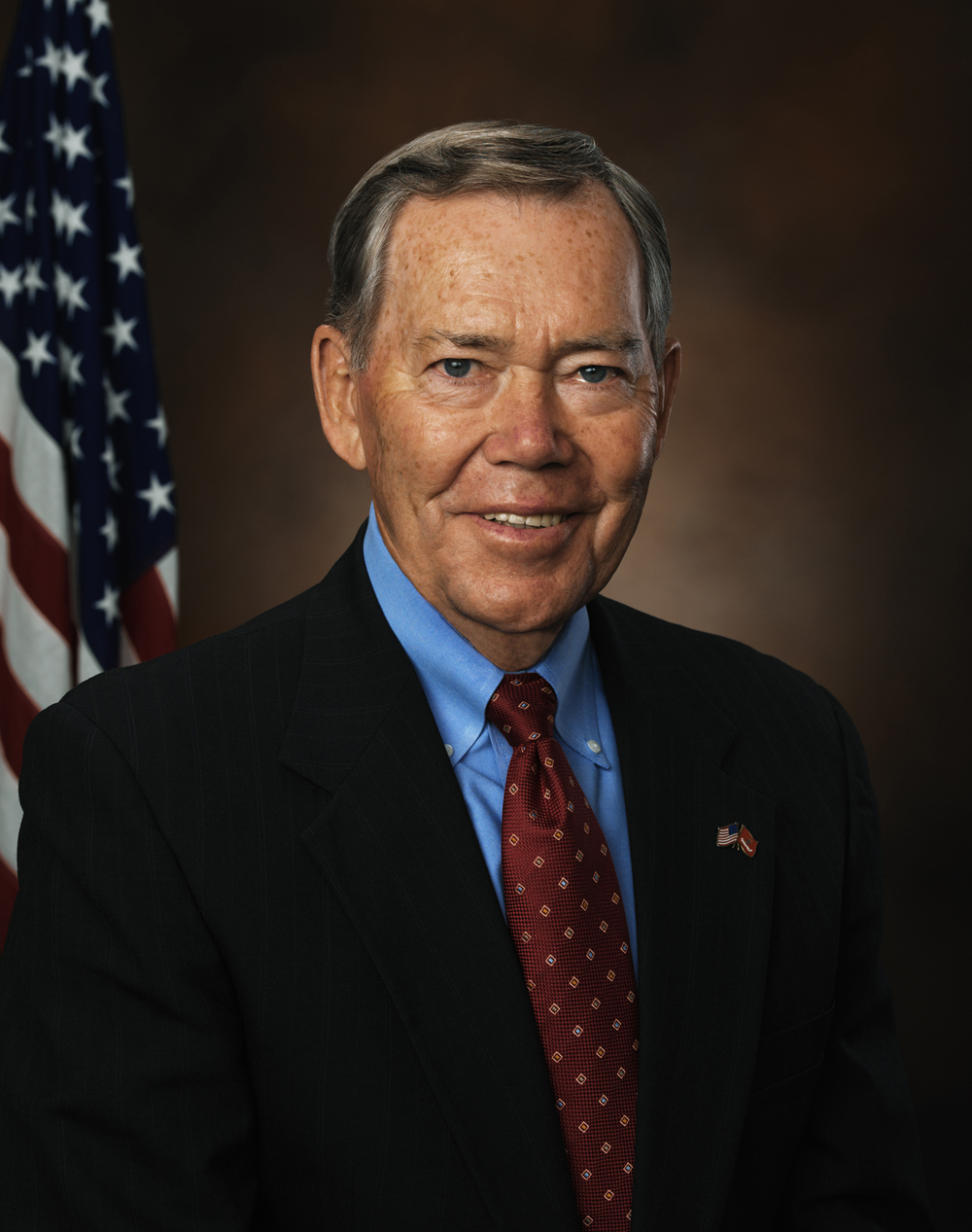

Nominee	Craig L. Thomas	Mel Logan
Party	Republican	Democratic
Popular vote	157,622	47,087
Percentage	73.8%	22.0%
- County results Thomas: 60–70% 70–80% 80–90%
U.S. senator before election
Craig L. Thomas
Republican
Elected U.S. senator
Craig L. Thomas
Republican

Incumbent Republican Craig Thomas won re-election to a second term over Democratic mine worker Mel Logan.

Democratic primary
Party	Candidate	Votes	%
Democratic	Mel Logan	16,530	64.59
Democratic	Sheldon Sumey	9,062	35.41
Total votes		29,612	100.00

Republican primary
Party	Candidate	Votes	%
Republican	Craig Thomas (Incumbent)	68,132	100.00
Total votes		68,132	100.00

General election
Party	Candidate	Votes	%	±%
Republican	Craig Thomas (Incumbent)	157,622	73.77	+14.90%
Democratic	Mel Logan	47,087	22.04	−17.27%
Libertarian	Margaret Dawson	8,950	4.19	+2.37%
Majority		110,535	51.73	+32.17%
Turnout		213,659		
Republican hold		Swing		

== See also ==
- 2000 United States elections
  - 2000 United States gubernatorial elections
  - 2000 United States presidential election
  - 2000 United States House of Representatives elections
- 106th United States Congress
- 107th United States Congress
