= 1994 United States Senate elections =

- November 8, 1994
- Class 1

35 (Note: 33 Class 1 seats, as well as 2 Class 2 seats in special election) of the 100 seats in the United States Senate 51 seats needed for a majority
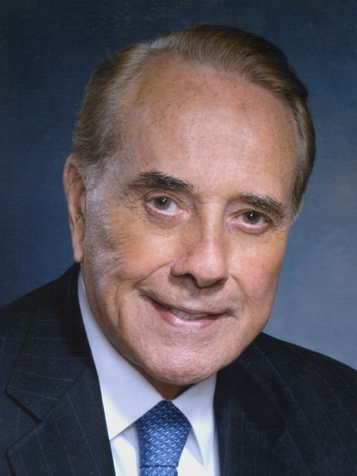

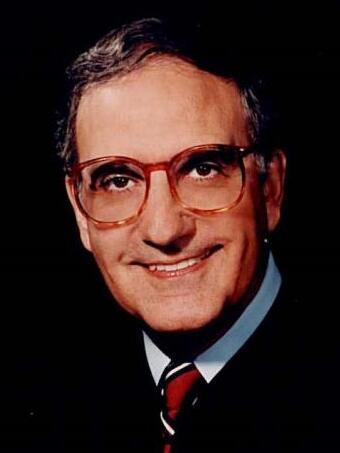
	Majority party	Minority party
Leader	Bob Dole	George Mitchell (retired)
Party	Republican	Democratic
Leader since	January 3, 1985	January 3, 1989
Leader's seat	Kansas	Maine
Seats before	44	56
Seats after	52	48
Seat change	▲8	▼8
Popular vote	29,155,739	25,627,430
Percentage	50.0%	44.0%
Seats up	13	22
Races won	21	14
- Results of the elections: Democratic hold Republican gain Republican hold No election Rectangular inset (Tennessee): both seats up for election
Majority leader before election
George Mitchell
Democratic
Elected Majority leader
Bob Dole
Republican

The 1994 United States Senate elections were held November 8, 1994, with the 33 seats of Class 1 contested in regular elections. Special elections were also held to fill vacancies. The Republican Party took control of the Senate from the Democrats. Like for most other midterm elections, the opposition, this time being the Republicans, held the traditional advantage. The congressional Republicans campaigned against the early presidency of Bill Clinton, including his unsuccessful healthcare plan. Democrats held a 56–44 majority, after having lost a seat in Texas in a 1993 special election. As of 2026, this is the most recent time in which the Republican Party won a majority of Class 1 Senate seats in a regularly scheduled election.

== Events of the election ==
The Republicans successfully defended all of their seats and won 8 from the Democrats by defeating the incumbent Senators Harris Wofford (Pennsylvania) and Jim Sasser (Tennessee), in addition to picking 6 open seats up in Arizona, Maine, Michigan, Ohio, Oklahoma, and Tennessee. Notably, since Sasser's defeat coincided with a Republican victory in the special election to replace Al Gore, Tennessee's Senate delegation switched from entirely Democratic to entirely Republican in a single election. That would not happen again until 2021, when the Democrats flipped Georgia's delegation in the state's regularly-scheduled and special Senate elections.

The elections marked the first time Republicans controlled the Senate since January 1987 and coincided with the first change of control in the House of Representatives since January 1955 and a Republican net gain of 10 governorships. Furthermore, this was the first popular election in which Republicans won all Senate seats based in the Deep South that were up for election. Collectively, the Republican gains are known as the Republican Revolution. Minority leader Robert J. Dole became Majority Leader, and on the Democratic side, Tom Daschle became Minority Leader after the retirement of the previous Democratic leader, George J. Mitchell.

This was the first time since 1980 where the Republicans made net gains in the Senate but also the last time until 2018 where the Republicans also made net gains among Class 1 senators. This was also the first time since 1952 where the Republicans won a majority of the Class 1 seats in a regularly scheduled election and, as of 2025, the most recent time where they have done so.

Initially, the balance was 52–48 in favor of the Republicans, but after the power change, Democrats Richard Shelby and Ben Nighthorse Campbell switched parties and brought the balance to 54–46. Democrat Ron Wyden won a 1996 special election to replace Republican Bob Packwood, which left the balance at 53–47 before the next election cycle. As of 2023, it is the last election cycle in which Republicans won Senate elections in Delaware, Michigan, and Washington. These are also the most recent elections from which none of the first-term senators elected remain serving in the Senate as of 2025.

== Results summary ==
↓
48	52
Democratic	Republican

Parties					Total
Parties	Democratic	Republican	Libertarian	Other	Total
Last elections (1992)	57	43	0	0	100
Before these elections	56	44	0	0	100
Not up	34	31	—	—	65
Up	22	13	—	—	35
Class 1 (1988→1994)	20	13	—	—	33
Special: Class 2	2	—	—	—	2
Incumbent retired	6 (Note: In Oklahoma, David Boren's resignation prompted a special election, while in Tennessee, appointee Harlan Mathews did not seek election to finish the unexpired term.)	3	—	—	9
Held by same party	0	3	—	—	3
Replaced by other party	▼6 Democrats replaced by ▲6 Republicans		—	—	6
Result	0	9	—	—	9
Incumbent ran	16	10	—	—	26
Won re-election	14	10	—	—	24
Lost re-election	▼2 Democrats replaced by ▲2 Republicans		—	—	2
Lost renomination, but held by same party	0	0	—	—	0
Result	14	12	—	—	26
Total elected	14	21	0	0	35
Net gain/loss	▼8	▲8	Steady	Steady	8
Nationwide vote	25,627,430	29,155,739	666,183	2,838,559	58,287,911
Share	43.97%	50.02%	1.14%	4.87%	100%
Result	48	52	—	—	100

Source: Clerk of the U.S. House of Representatives

== Change in composition ==
=== Before the elections ===
D_{1}	D_{2}	D_{3}	D_{4}	D_{5}	D_{6}	D_{7}	D_{8}	D_{9}	D_{10}
D_{20}	D_{19}	D_{18}	D_{17}	D_{16}	D_{15}	D_{14}	D_{13}	D_{12}	D_{11}
D_{21}	D_{22}	D_{23}	D_{24}	D_{25}	D_{26}	D_{27}	D_{28}	D_{29}	D_{30}
D_{40} Md. Ran	D_{39} Maine; Retired	D_{38} Hawaii; Ran	D_{37} Conn. Ran	D_{36} Calif. Ran	D_{35} Ariz. Retired	D_{34}	D_{33}	D_{32}	D_{31}
D_{41} Mass. Ran	D_{42} Mich. Retired	D_{43} Neb. Ran	D_{44} Nev. Ran	D_{45} N.J. Ran	D_{46} N.M. Ran	D_{47} N.Y. Ran	D_{48} N.D. Ran	D_{49} Ohio; Retired	D_{50} Okla. (sp); Resigned
Majority →									D_{51} Pa. Ran
R_{41} Utah; Ran	R_{42} Vt. Ran	R_{43} Wash. Ran	R_{44} Wyo. Retired	D_{56} Wisc. Ran	D_{55} W.Va. Ran	D_{54} Va. Ran	D_{53} Tenn. (sp); Retired	D_{52} Tenn. (reg); Ran	D_{51} Pa. Ran
R_{40} Texas; Ran	R_{39} R.I. Ran	R_{38} Mont. Ran	R_{37} Mo. Retired	R_{36} Miss. Ran	R_{35} Minn. Retired	R_{34} Indiana; Ran	R_{33} Fla. Ran	R_{32} Del. Ran	R_{31}
R_{21}	R_{22}	R_{23}	R_{24}	R_{25}	R_{26}	R_{27}	R_{28}	R_{29}	R_{30}
R_{20}	R_{19}	R_{18}	R_{17}	R_{16}	R_{15}	R_{14}	R_{13}	R_{12}	R_{11}
R_{1}	R_{2}	R_{3}	R_{4}	R_{5}	R_{6}	R_{7}	R_{8}	R_{9}	R_{10}

=== After the elections ===
D_{1}	D_{2}	D_{3}	D_{4}	D_{5}	D_{6}	D_{7}	D_{8}	D_{9}	D_{10}
D_{20}	D_{19}	D_{18}	D_{17}	D_{16}	D_{15}	D_{14}	D_{13}	D_{12}	D_{11}
D_{21}	D_{22}	D_{23}	D_{24}	D_{25}	D_{26}	D_{27}	D_{28}	D_{29}	D_{30}
D_{40} Neb. Re-elected	D_{39} Mass. Re-elected	D_{38} Md. Re-elected	D_{37} Hawaii; Re-elected	D_{36} Conn. Re-elected	D_{35} Calif. Re-elected	D_{34}	D_{33}	D_{32}	D_{31}
D_{41} Nev. Re-elected	D_{42} N.J. Re-elected	D_{43} N.M. Re-elected	D_{44} N.Y. Re-elected	D_{45} N.D. Re-elected	D_{46} Va. Re-elected	D_{47} W.Va. Re-elected	D_{48} Wis. Re-elected	R_{52} Tenn. (sp); Gain	R_{51} Tenn. (reg); Gain
Majority →									R_{51} Tenn. (reg); Gain
R_{41} Utah; Re-elected	R_{42} Vt. Re-elected	R_{43} Wash. Re-elected	R_{44} Wyo. Hold	R_{45} Ariz. Gain	R_{46} Maine; Gain	R_{47} Mich. Gain	R_{48} Ohio; Gain	R_{49} Okla. (sp); Gain	R_{50} Pa. Gain
R_{40} Texas; Re-elected	R_{39} R.I. Re-elected	R_{38} Mont. Re-elected	R_{37} Mo. Hold	R_{36} Miss. Re-elected	R_{35} Minn. Hold	R_{34} Indiana; Re-elected	R_{33} Fla. Re-elected	R_{32} Del. Re-elected	R_{31}
R_{21}	R_{22}	R_{23}	R_{24}	R_{25}	R_{26}	R_{27}	R_{28}	R_{29}	R_{30}
R_{20}	R_{19}	R_{18}	R_{17}	R_{16}	R_{15}	R_{14}	R_{13}	R_{12}	R_{11}
R_{1}	R_{2}	R_{3}	R_{4}	R_{5}	R_{6}	R_{7}	R_{8}	R_{9}	R_{10}

=== Beginning of the next Congress ===
D_{1}	D_{2}	D_{3}	D_{4}	D_{5}	D_{6}	D_{7}	D_{8}	D_{9}	D_{10}
D_{20}	D_{19}	D_{18}	D_{17}	D_{16}	D_{15}	D_{14}	D_{13}	D_{12}	D_{11}
D_{21}	D_{22}	D_{23}	D_{24}	D_{25}	D_{26}	D_{27}	D_{28}	D_{29}	D_{30}
D_{40}	D_{39}	D_{38}	D_{37}	D_{36}	D_{35}	D_{34}	D_{33}	D_{32}	D_{31}
D_{41}	D_{42}	D_{43}	D_{44}	D_{45}	D_{46}	R_{54} Colo. Changed (Note: Richard Shelby, whose seat was not up for election in 1994, left the Democratic Party and became a Republican a couple of days later, after the election but before the swearing in of the next Congress. As a result, 53 Republicans, were in the Senate upon commencement of the 104th United States Congress, on January 3, 1995. Another Democrat, Ben Nighthorse Campbell, joined the Republican Party on March 3, 1995, the increase of Republicans changed to 54.)	R_{53} Ala. Changed	R_{52}	R_{51}
Majority on the onset of Republican Revolution →									R_{51}
R_{41}	R_{42}	R_{43}	R_{44}	R_{45}	R_{46}	R_{47}	R_{48}	R_{49}	R_{50}
R_{40}	R_{39}	R_{38}	R_{37}	R_{36}	R_{35}	R_{34}	R_{33}	R_{32}	R_{31}
R_{21}	R_{22}	R_{23}	R_{24}	R_{25}	R_{26}	R_{27}	R_{28}	R_{29}	R_{30}
R_{20}	R_{19}	R_{18}	R_{17}	R_{16}	R_{15}	R_{14}	R_{13}	R_{12}	R_{11}
R_{1}	R_{2}	R_{3}	R_{4}	R_{5}	R_{6}	R_{7}	R_{8}	R_{9}	R_{10}

Key	D_{#} / Democratic; R_{#} / Republican

== Gains and losses ==
=== Retirements ===
Map of retirements: Republican incumbent Democratic incumbent Democratic incumbent retired or resigned Republican incumbent retired

Three Republicans and four Democrats retired instead of seeking re-election. Additionally, one Democrat also retired instead of finishing the unexpired term.

State	Senator	Age at end of term	Assumed office	Replaced by
Arizona	Dennis DeConcini	57	1977	Jon Kyl
Maine	George J. Mitchell	61	1980 (Note: Appointed to the seat following the resignation of Edmund Muskie.)	Olympia Snowe
Michigan	Donald Riegle	56	1976 (Note: Appointed to the seat following the death of Philip Hart, four days before his term was set to begin at the 95th Congress.)	Spencer Abraham
Minnesota	David Durenberger	56	1978 (Note: Elected in the special election to finish Hubert Humphrey's term.)	Rod Grams
Missouri	John Danforth	58	1976	John Ashcroft
Ohio	Howard Metzenbaum	77	1976 (Note: Metzenbaum previously served as a Senator in 1974.)	Mike DeWine
Tennessee (special)	Harlan Mathews	67	1993 (Note: Appointed to the seat following the resignation of Al Gore.)	Fred Thompson
Wyoming	Malcolm Wallop	61	1977	Craig L. Thomas

=== Resignations ===
One Democrat resigned three years into his six-year term.

State	Senator	Age of resignation	Assumed office	Replaced by
Oklahoma (special)	David Boren	53	1979	Jim Inhofe

=== Defeats ===
Two Democrats sought re-election but lost in the general election.

State	Senator	Assumed office	Replaced by
Pennsylvania	Harris Wofford	1991 (Note: Appointed to the seat following the death of John Heinz.)	Rick Santorum
Tennessee (regular)	Jim Sasser	1977	Bill Frist

=== Post-election changes ===
One Republican resigned on June 11, 1996, was replaced by a Republican appointee. Two Democrats switched to the Republican Party shortly after the election.

State	Senator	Replaced by
Kansas (Class 3)	Bob Dole	Sheila Frahm
Colorado (Class 3)	Ben Nighthorse Campbell	Ben Nighthorse Campbell
Alabama (Class 3)	Richard Shelby	Richard Shelby

== Race summary ==
=== Special elections ===
In these special elections, the winners were elected and seated during 1994.

Elections are sorted by date then state and class.

State	Incumbent			Results	Candidates
State	Senator	Party	Electoral history	Results	Candidates
Oklahoma (Class 2)	David Boren	Democratic	1978; 1984; 1990	Incumbent resigned November 15, 1994. New senator elected November 8, 1994 and seated November 17, 1994. Republican gain.	▌ ✓ Jim Inhofe (Republican) 55.2%; ▌Dave McCurdy (Democratic) 40.0%; ▌Danny Corn (Independent) 4.8%
Tennessee (Class 2)	Harlan Mathews	Democratic	1993 (appointed)	Interim appointee retired. New senator elected November 8, 1994 and seated December 2, 1994. Republican gain.	▌ ✓ Fred Thompson (Republican) 60.4%; ▌Jim Cooper (Democratic) 38.6%

=== Elections leading to the next Congress ===
In these general elections, the winners were elected for the term beginning January 3, 1995; ordered by state.

All of the elections involved the Class 1 seats.

State	Incumbent			Results	Candidates
State	Senator	Party	Electoral history	Results	Candidates
Arizona	Dennis DeConcini	Democratic	1976; 1982; 1988	Incumbent retired. Republican gain.	▌ ✓ Jon Kyl (Republican) 53.7%; ▌Sam Coppersmith (Democratic) 39.5%; ▌Scott Grainger (Libertarian) 6.8%
California	Dianne Feinstein	Democratic	1992 (special)	Incumbent re-elected.	▌ ✓ Dianne Feinstein (Democratic) 46.7%; ▌Michael Huffington (Republican) 44.8%; Others: ▌Elizabeth Barron (Peace and Freedom) 3%; ▌Richard Boddie (Libertarian) 2.1%; ▌Paul Meeuwenberg (American Independent) 1.7%; ▌Barbara Blong (Green) 1.7%
Connecticut	Joe Lieberman	Democratic	1988	Incumbent re-elected.	▌ ✓ Joe Lieberman (Democratic) 67%; ▌Jerry Labriola (Republican) 31%; ▌Gary R. Garneau (Concerned Citizens) 1.9%
Delaware	William Roth	Republican	1970; 1971 (appointed); 1976; 1982; 1988	Incumbent re-elected.	▌ ✓ William Roth (Republican) 55.8%; ▌Charles Oberly (Democratic) 42.5%; ▌John C. Dierick (Libertarian) 1.7%
Florida	Connie Mack III	Republican	1988	Incumbent re-elected.	▌ ✓ Connie Mack III (Republican) 70.5%; ▌Hugh Rodham (Democratic) 30.5%
Hawaii	Daniel Akaka	Democratic	1990 (appointed); 1990 (special)	Incumbent re-elected.	▌ ✓ Daniel Akaka (Democratic) 71.8%; ▌Maria Hustace (Republican) 24.2%; ▌Richard Rowland (Libertarian) 4%
Indiana	Richard Lugar	Republican	1976; 1982; 1988	Incumbent re-elected.	▌ ✓ Richard Lugar (Republican) 67.4%; ▌Jim Jontz (Democratic) 30.5%; Others: ▌Barbara Bourland (Libertarian) 1.1%; ▌Mary Catherine Barton (New Alliance) 1%
Maine	George J. Mitchell	Democratic	1980 (appointed); 1982; 1988	Incumbent retired. Republican gain.	▌ ✓ Olympia Snowe (Republican) 60.2%; ▌Thomas Andrews (Democratic) 36.4%; ▌Plato Truman (Independent) 3.4%
Maryland	Paul Sarbanes	Democratic	1976; 1982; 1988	Incumbent re-elected.	▌ ✓ Paul Sarbanes (Democratic) 59.1%; ▌Bill Brock (Republican) 40.9%
Massachusetts	Ted Kennedy	Democratic	1962 (special); 1964; 1970; 1976; 1982; 1988	Incumbent re-elected.	▌ ✓ Ted Kennedy (Democratic) 58.1%; ▌Mitt Romney (Republican) 41%; Others: ▌Lauraleigh Dozier (Libertarian) 0.7%; ▌William A. Ferguson Jr. (LaRouche Was Right) 0.2%
Michigan	Donald Riegle	Democratic	1976; 1976 (appointed); 1982; 1988	Incumbent retired. Republican gain.	▌ ✓ Spencer Abraham (Republican) 51.9%; ▌Bob Carr (Democratic) 42.7%; ▌Jon Coon (Libertarian) 4.2%; Others: ▌William Roundtree (Workers World) 0.7%; ▌Chris Wege (Natural Law) 0.5%
Minnesota	David Durenberger	Republican	1978 (special); 1982; 1988	Incumbent retired. Republican hold.	▌ ✓ Rod Grams (Republican) 49.1%; ▌Ann Wynia (DFL) 44.1%; ▌Dean Barkley (Reform) 5.4%; Others: ▌Candice E. Sjostrom (Grassroots) 0.9%; ▌Stephen Johnson (Natural Law) 0.3%; ▌Chris Wege (Socialist Workers) 0.1%
Mississippi	Trent Lott	Republican	1988	Incumbent re-elected.	▌ ✓ Trent Lott (Republican) 68.8%; ▌Ken Harper (Democratic) 31.2%
Missouri	John Danforth	Republican	1976; 1976 (appointed); 1982; 1988	Incumbent retired. Republican hold.	▌ ✓ John Ashcroft (Republican) 59.8%; ▌Alan Wheat (Democratic) 35.7%; ▌Bill Johnson (Libertarian) 4.6%
Montana	Conrad Burns	Republican	1988	Incumbent re-elected.	▌ ✓ Conrad Burns (Republican) 62.4%; ▌Jack Mudd (Democratic) 37.6%
Nebraska	Bob Kerrey	Democratic	1988	Incumbent re-elected.	▌ ✓ Bob Kerrey (Democratic) 55%; ▌Jan Stoney (Republican) 45%
Nevada	Richard Bryan	Democratic	1988	Incumbent re-elected.	▌ ✓ Richard Bryan (Democratic) 50.9%; ▌Hal Furman (Republican) 41.0%; Others: ▌Anna Nevenich (Independent) 1.8%; ▌Bob Days (Libertarian) 1.6%; ▌Neal A. Grasteit (Independent American) 1.4%
New Jersey	Frank Lautenberg	Democratic	1982; 1982 (appointed); 1988	Incumbent re-elected.	▌ ✓ Frank Lautenberg (Democratic) 50.4%; ▌Chuck Haytaian (Republican) 47.0%; Others: ▌Michael P. Kelly (Keep America First) 0.7%; ▌Ben Grindlinger (Libertarian) 0.7%; ▌Richard J. Pezzullo (Conservative) 0.4%; ▌Andrea Lippi (Jobs, Property Rights) 0.3%; ▌George Patrick Predham (Damn Drug Dealers) 0.2%; ▌Joanne Kuniansky (Socialist Workers) 0.2%; ▌Arlene Gold (Natural Law) 0.2%
New Mexico	Jeff Bingaman	Democratic	1982; 1988	Incumbent re-elected.	▌ ✓ Jeff Bingaman (Democratic) 54.0%; ▌Colin McMillan (Republican) 46.0%
New York	Daniel Patrick Moynihan	Democratic	1976; 1982; 1988	Incumbent re-elected.	▌ ✓ Daniel Patrick Moynihan (Democratic) 55.3%; ▌Bernadette Castro (Republican) 42.3%; ▌Henry Hewes (Right to Life) 1.8%; Others: ▌Ismael Betancourt Jr. (Independence) 0.5%; ▌Norma Segal (Libertarian) 0.3%; ▌Naomi L. Craine (Socialist Workers) 0.3%
North Dakota	Kent Conrad	Democratic–NPL	1986; 1992 (retired); 1992 (special)	Incumbent re-elected.	▌ ✓ Kent Conrad (Democratic-NPL) 58%; ▌Ben Clayburgh (Republican) 42%
Ohio	Howard Metzenbaum	Democratic	1974 (appointed); 1974 (lost); 1974 (resigned); 1976; 1976 (appointed); 1982; 1988	Incumbent retired. Republican gain.	▌ ✓ Mike DeWine (Republican) 53.4%; ▌Joel Hyatt (Democratic) 39.2%; ▌Joseph Slovenec (Independent) 7.3%
Pennsylvania	Harris Wofford	Democratic	1991 (appointed); 1991 (special)	Incumbent lost re-election. Republican gain.	▌ ✓ Rick Santorum (Republican) 49.4%; ▌Harris Wofford (Democratic) 46.9%; Others: ▌Diane Blough (Patriot) 2.0%; ▌Donald C. Ernsberger (Libertarian) 1.7%
Rhode Island	John Chafee	Republican	1976; 1976 (appointed); 1988	Incumbent re-elected.	▌ ✓ John Chafee (Republican) 64%; ▌Linda Kushner (Democratic) 36%
Tennessee	Jim Sasser	Democratic	1976; 1982; 1988	Incumbent lost re-election. Republican gain.	▌ ✓ Bill Frist (Republican) 56.4%; ▌Jim Sasser (Democratic) 42.1%
Texas	Kay Bailey Hutchison	Republican	1993 (special)	Incumbent re-elected.	▌ ✓ Kay Bailey Hutchison (Republican) 60.8%; ▌Richard W. Fisher (Democratic) 38.3%; ▌Pierre Blondeau (Libertarian) 0.8%
Utah	Orrin Hatch	Republican	1976; 1982; 1988	Incumbent re-elected.	▌ ✓ Orrin Hatch (Republican) 68.8%; ▌Patrick Shea (Democratic) 28.3%; Others: ▌Craig Oliver (Independent) 1.8%; ▌Gary R. Van Horn (American) 0.5%; ▌Nelson Gonzalez (Socialist Workers) 0.3%; ▌Lawrence Rey Topham (Independent American) 0.3%
Vermont	Jim Jeffords	Republican	1988	Incumbent re-elected.	▌ ✓ Jim Jeffords (Republican) 50.3%; ▌Jan Backus (Democratic) 40.6%; ▌Gavin T. Mills (Independent) 5.9%; Others: ▌Matthew S. Mulligan (Independent) 1.4%; ▌Bob Melamede (Grassroots) 0.7%; ▌Jerry Levy (Liberty Union) 0.6%; ▌Joseph Victor Pardo (Natural Law) 0.3%
Virginia	Chuck Robb	Democratic	1988	Incumbent re-elected.	▌ ✓ Chuck Robb (Democratic) 45.6%; ▌Oliver North (Republican) 42.9%; ▌Marshall Coleman (Independent) 11.4%
Washington	Slade Gorton	Republican	1980; 1986 (lost); 1988	Incumbent re-elected.	▌ ✓ Slade Gorton (Republican) 55.75%; ▌Ron Sims (Democratic) 44.25%
West Virginia	Robert Byrd	Democratic	1958; 1964; 1970; 1976; 1982; 1988	Incumbent re-elected.	▌ ✓ Robert Byrd (Democratic) 69.0%; ▌Stanley L. Klos (Republican) 31.0%
Wisconsin	Herb Kohl	Democratic	1988	Incumbent re-elected.	▌ ✓ Herb Kohl (Democratic) 58.3%; ▌Robert Welch (Republican) 40.7%; ▌James Dean (Libertarian) 1.0%
Wyoming	Malcolm Wallop	Republican	1976; 1982; 1988	Incumbent retired. Republican hold.	▌ ✓ Craig L. Thomas (Republican) 58.9%; ▌Mike Sullivan (Democratic) 39.3%; ▌Craig McCune (Libertarian) 1.8%

== Closest races ==
State	Party of winner	Margin
California	Democratic	1.9%
Pennsylvania	Republican (flip)	2.5%
Virginia	Democratic	2.7%
New Jersey	Democratic	3.3%
Minnesota	Republican	5.0% (Note: Minnesota was the "tipping point" state.)
New Mexico	Democratic	8.0%
Michigan	Republican (flip)	9.1%
Vermont	Republican	9.7%
Nebraska	Democratic	9.8%
Nevada	Democratic	9.9%

== Arizona ==
Arizona election
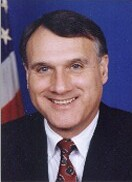

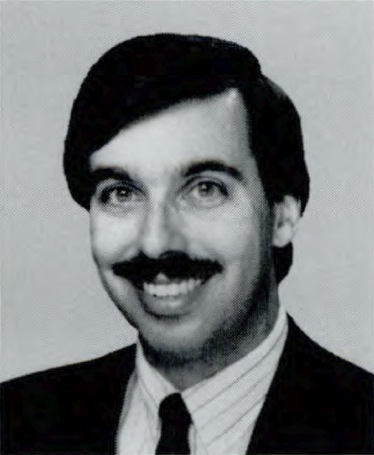
Nominee	Jon Kyl	Sam Coppersmith
Party	Republican	Democratic
Popular vote	600,999	442,510
Percentage	53.7%	39.5%
Nominee	Scott Grainger
Party	Libertarian
Popular vote	75,493
Percentage	6.8%
- County results Kyl: 40–50% 50–60% Coppersmith: 40–50% 50–60% 60–70%
U.S. senator before election
Dennis DeConcini
Democratic
Elected U.S. senator
Jon Kyl
Republican

Three-term Democratic incumbent Dennis DeConcini retired after being a member of the Keating Five Scandal. Republican Congressman Jon Kyl defeated his Democratic opponent, fellow Congressman Sam Coppersmith by a comfortable margin.

Democratic primary election
Party	Candidate	Votes	%
Democratic	Sam Coppersmith	81,995	32.15%
Democratic	Richard Mahoney	81,863	32.10%
Democratic	Cindy Resnick	75,563	29.63%
Democratic	David Moss	15,612	6.12%
Total votes		200,120	100.00%

Republican primary election
Party	Candidate	Votes	%
Republican	Jon Kyl	231,275	99.04%
Republican	Write-ins	2,248	0.96%
Total votes		231,733	100.00%

Libertarian primary election
Party	Candidate	Votes	%
Libertarian	Scott Grainger	5,424	100.00%
Total votes		5,424	100.00%

General election
Party	Candidate	Votes	%	±%
Republican	Jon Kyl	600,999	53.71%	+12.65%
Democratic	Sam Coppersmith	442,510	39.54%	−17.17%
Libertarian	Scott Grainger	75,493	6.75%	+4.96%
Write-ins		58	0.00%	
Majority		158,489	14.16%	−1.50%
Turnout		1,119,060		
Republican gain from Democratic		Swing		

== California ==
California election
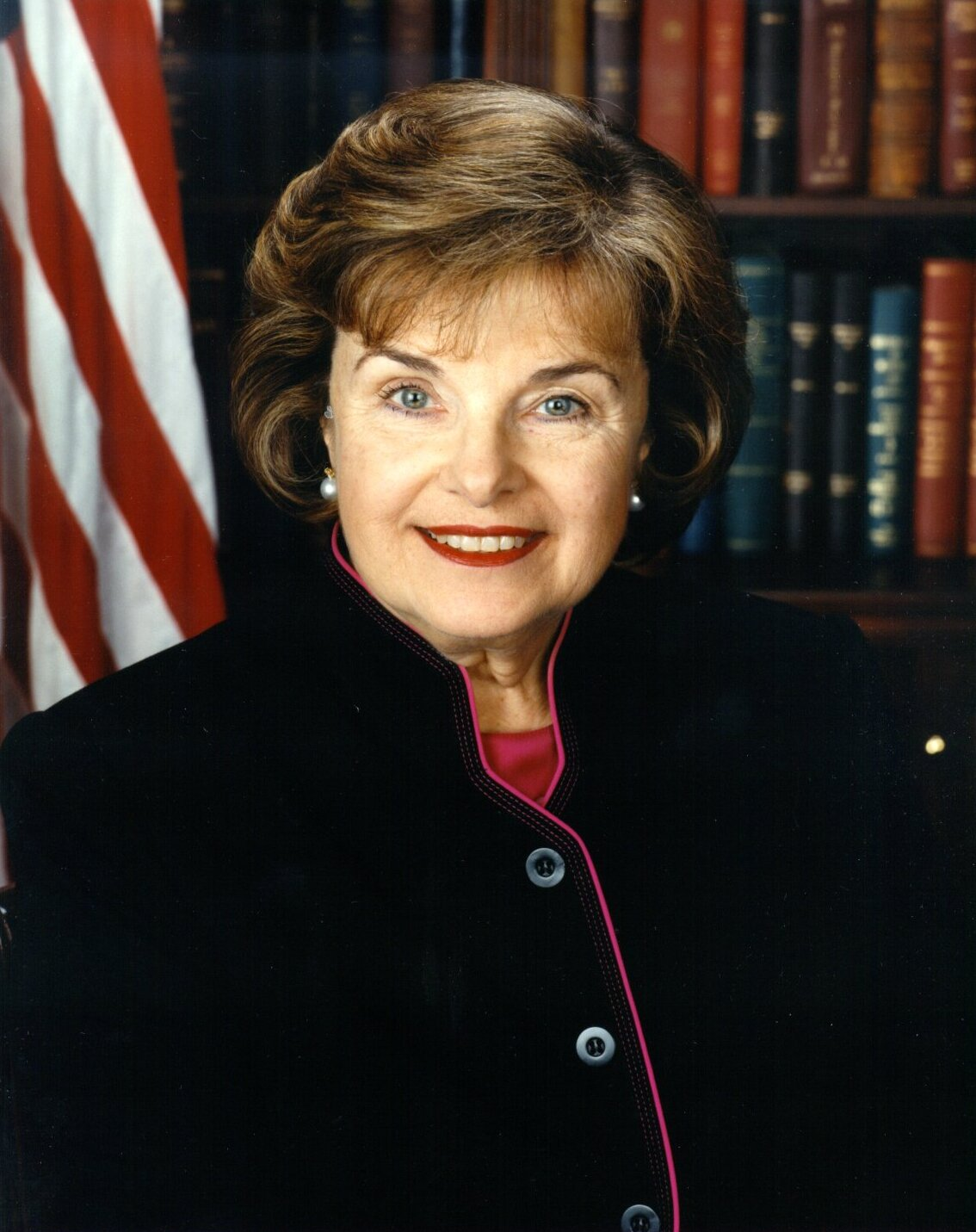

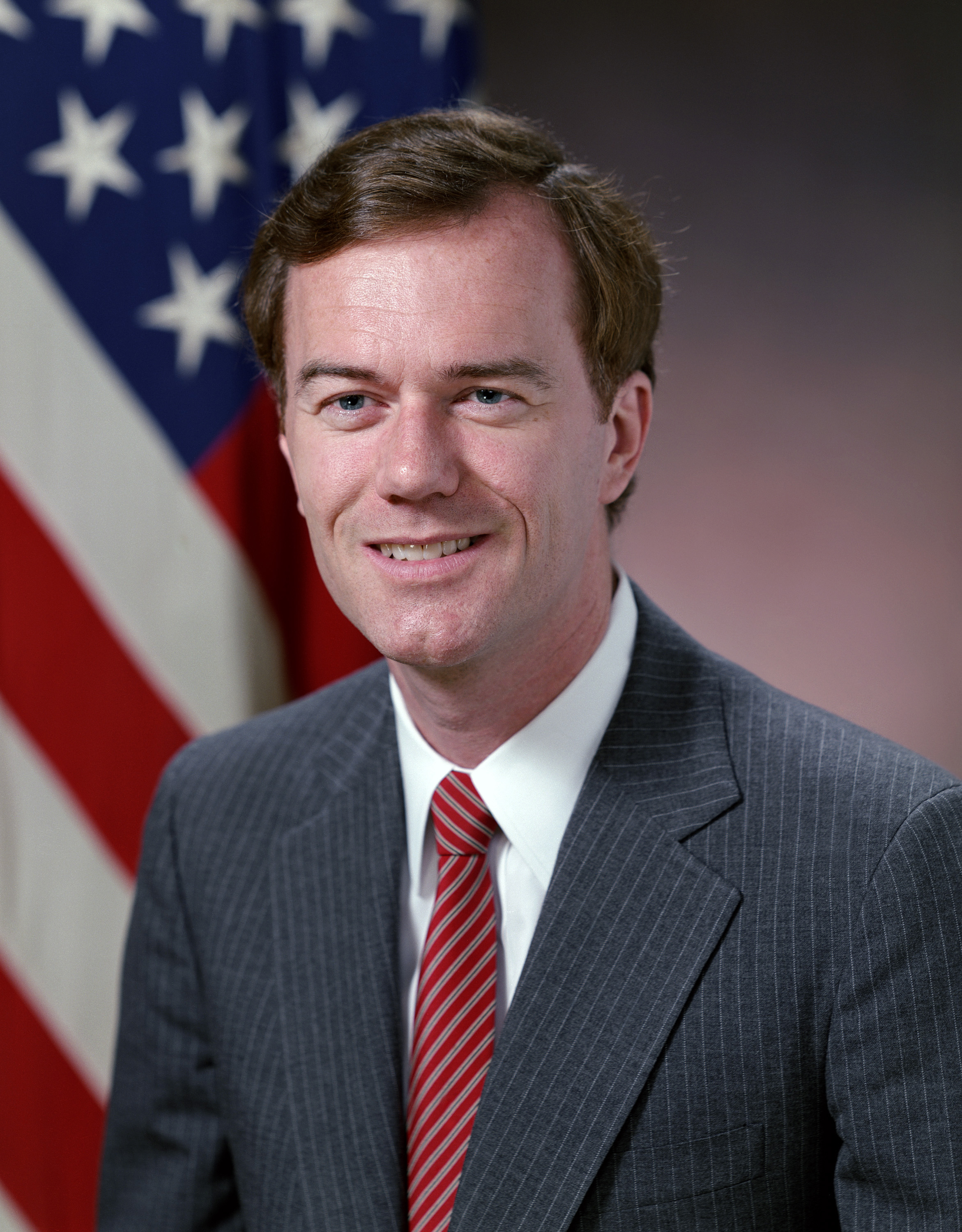
Nominee	Dianne Feinstein	Michael Huffington
Party	Democratic	Republican
Popular vote	3,979,152	3,817,025
Percentage	46.74%	44.83%
- County results Feinstein: 40–50% 50–60% 60–70% 70–80% Huffington: 40–50% 50–60% 60–70%
U.S. senator before election
Dianne Feinstein
Democratic
Elected U.S. senator
Dianne Feinstein
Democratic

Dianne Feinstein won a special election in 1992 to fill the seat of Governor Pete Wilson. She faced wealthy Republican Congressman Michael Huffington in her race for a full term. Feinstein emerged victorious by less than two points.

1994 United States Senate Democratic primary, California
Candidate	Votes	%
Dianne Feinstein (Incumbent)	1,635,837	74.20%
Ted J. Andromedas	297,128	13.48%
Daniel O'Dowd	271,615	12.32%
Total votes	2,204,580	100.00%

1994 United States Senate Republican primary, California
Candidate	Votes	%
Michael Huffington	1,072,358	53.79%
William E. Dannemeyer	565,864	28.38%
Kate Squires	202,950	10.18%
James Peter Gough	58,853	2.95%
Wolf G. Dalichau	58,307	2.92%
John M. Brown	35,212	1.77%
Total votes	1,993,544	100.00%

1994 United States Senate Peace & Freedom primary, California
Candidate	Votes	%
Elizabeth Cervantes Barron	3,487	70.70%
Larry D. Hampshire	1,445	29.30%
Total votes	4,932	100.00%

1994 United States Senate primary, California (Others)
Party	Candidate	Votes	%
Libertarian	Richard Benjamin Boddie	120,622	100.00%
American Independent	Paul Meeuwenberg	13,596	100.00%
Green	Barbara Blong	N/A	100.00%

After one term in the House representing Santa Barbara and San Luis Obispo counties, Huffington spent $8 million by the end of August and a total of $28 million during the entire campaign. He became wealthy off oil and gas. The race saw personal attacks on Huffington's wife, Arianna Huffington, who was very involved in the race (the media dubbed her the "Sir Edmund Hillary of social climbing," according to The Almanac of American Politics).

Huffington was called a hypocrite for supporting Proposition 187 and then breaking the law for employing illegal aliens, a story which came out in the race's final days. $44 million was spent in the election. At the time, it was the most expensive campaign in a non-presidential election in American history. Chris Cillizza of The Washington Post named the election one of the nastiest senate elections in modern history.

On election day it was a very close race, but Feinstein won Los Angeles County, which may have pulled her ahead. Her sizable win in the nine-county San Francisco Bay Area may also be credited to her slim statewide victory.

1994 United States Senate election in California
Party	Candidate	Votes	%
Democratic	Dianne Feinstein (Incumbent)	3,979,152	46.74%
Republican	Michael Huffington	3,817,025	44.83%
Peace and Freedom	Elizabeth Cervantes Barron	255,301	3.00%
Libertarian	Richard Benjamin Boddie	179,100	2.10%
American Independent	Paul Meeuwenberg	142,771	1.68%
Green	Barbara Blong	140,567	1.65%
No party	Write-ins	173	<0.01%
Invalid or blank votes		386,547	4.34% (Note: "Votes not cast" as a percentage of votes cast anywhere statewide, which numbered 8,900,593.)
Majority		162,127	1.90%
Total votes		8,514,089	100.00%
Turnout			44.94% (Note: As a percentage of the voting eligible population (VEP), estimated at 18.946 million.)
Democratic hold			

== Connecticut ==
Connecticut election
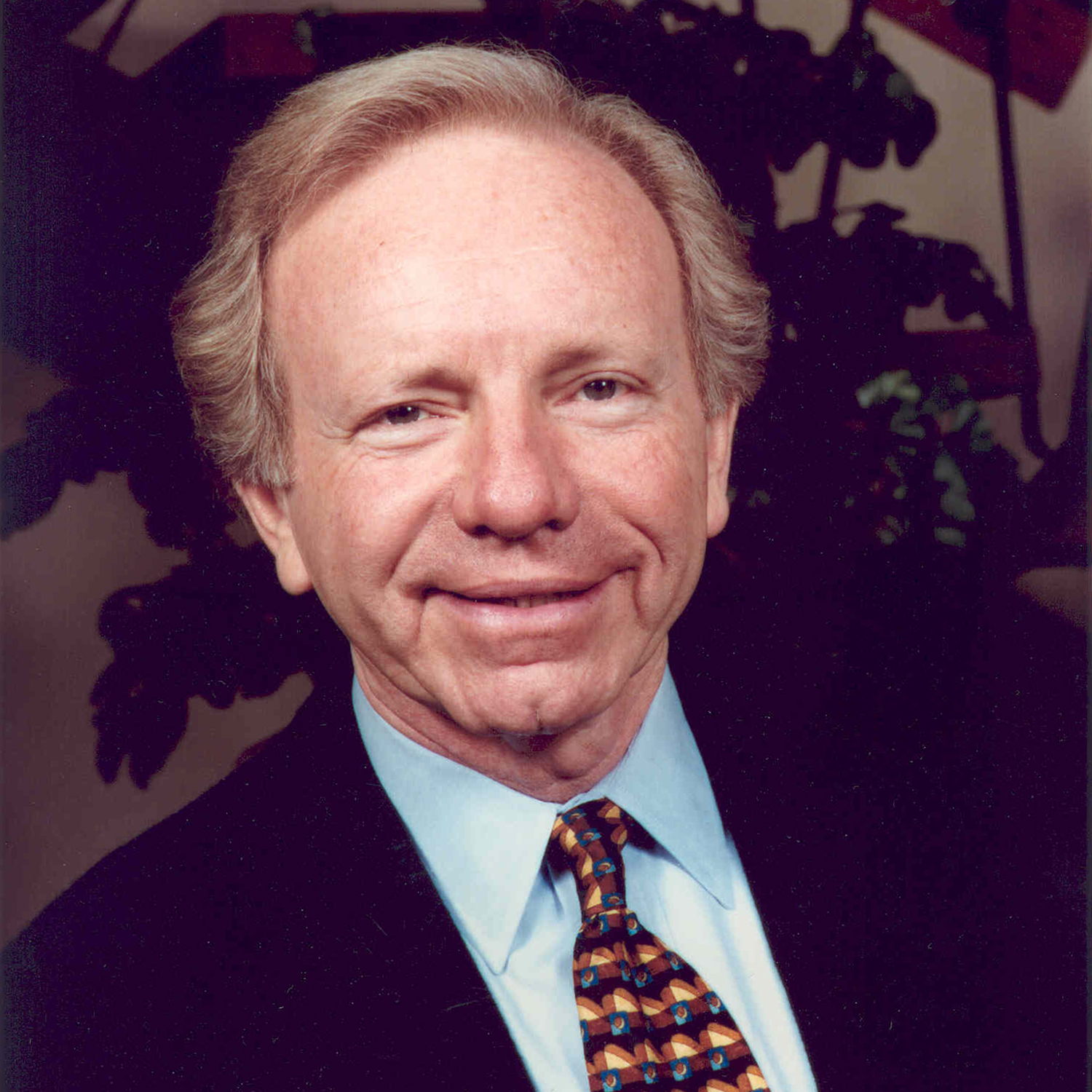

Nominee	Joe Lieberman	Jerry Labriola
Party	Democratic	Republican
Popular vote	723,842	334,833
Percentage	67.0%	31.0%
- Lieberman: 40–50% 50–60% 60–70% 70–80% 80–90% Labriola: 40–50% 50–60%
U.S. senator before election
Joe Lieberman
Democratic
Elected U.S. senator
Joe Lieberman
Democratic

Freshman Democratic incumbent Joseph Lieberman easily won re-election over Republican physician Jerry Labriola.

General election
Party	Candidate	Votes	%
Democratic	Joe Lieberman (Incumbent)	723,842 (Note: Lieberman's votes include 280,049 votes received on the line of A Connecticut Party, which cross-endorsed Lieberman.)	67.0%
Republican	Jerry Labriola	334,833	31.0%
Concerned Citizens	Gary R. Garneau	20,988	1.9%
Write-In	Write-in candidates (3)	103	<0.1%
Total votes		1,079,766	100.0%
Democratic hold			

== Delaware ==
Delaware election
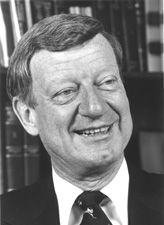

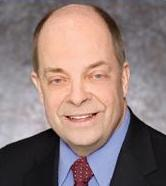
Nominee	William Roth	Charles Oberly
Party	Republican	Democratic
Popular vote	111,074	84,540
Percentage	55.8%	42.5%
- County results Roth: 50–60% 60–70%
U.S. senator before election
William Roth
Republican
Elected U.S. senator
William Roth
Republican

Veteran Republican incumbent William Roth, seeking his fifth term, fended off a challenge from Charles Oberly, the state's three-term Democratic attorney general, beating him by 13 points.

General election
Party	Candidate	Votes	%	±%
Republican	William Roth (Incumbent)	111,074	55.82%	−6.25%
Democratic	Charles Oberly	84,540	42.48%	+4.54%
Libertarian	John Dierickx	3,386	1.70%	
Majority		26,534	13.33%	−10.79%
Turnout		199,000		
Republican hold		Swing		

== Florida ==
Florida election
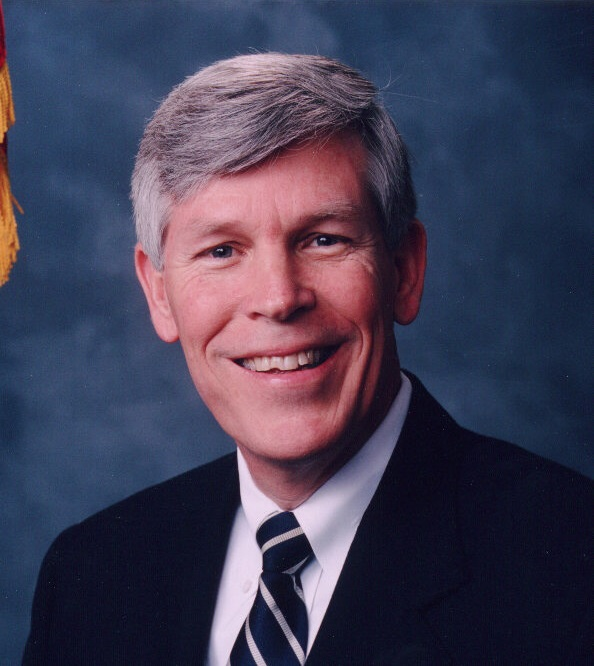

Nominee	Connie Mack III	Hugh Rodham
Party	Republican	Democratic
Popular vote	2,895,200	1,210,577
Percentage	70.5%	29.5%
- County results Mack: 50–60% 60–70% 70–80% 80–90%
U.S. senator before election
Connie Mack III
Republican
Elected U.S. senator
Connie Mack III
Republican

Republican incumbent Connie Mack III won a second term by scoring an easy re-election over attorney Hugh Rodham, brother of First Lady Hillary Rodham Clinton.

Republican primary results
Party	Candidate	Votes	%
Republican	Connie Mack	Unopposed	100.0%

Democratic primary election
Party	Candidate	Votes	%
Democratic	Hugh Rodham	255,605	33.78%
Democratic	Mike Wiley	188,551	24.92%
Democratic	Ellis Rubin	161,386	21.33%
Democratic	A. Perez	151,121	19.97%
Total votes		756,663	100%

Democratic primary runoff
Party	Candidate	Votes	%
Democratic	Hugh Rodham	221,424	58.09%
Democratic	Mike Wiley	159,776	41.91%
Total votes		381,200	100%

Rodham left the public defenders office to run for the United States Senate in Florida in 1994. He won the Democratic Party nomination by defeating Mike Wiley in a runoff election, after earlier finishing first in a four-person primary field with 34 percent. After the first primary, the third-place finisher, Miami lawyer Ellis Rubin joined forces with Rodham as a "senior executive consultant" and hatchet man. In the presence of Rodham at a press conference, Rubin levelled the accusation that Wiley was hiding his Jewish faith by changing his name from his birth name, Michael Schreibman, and that Wiley "changed his name before the campaign to deceive voters about his Jewish religion." Wiley accordingly refused to endorse Rodham after the runoff. Rodham then lost by a 70%–30% margin to incumbent senator Republican Connie Mack III in the general election. Although Bill and Hillary Clinton both campaigned for him, his organization was unable to take advantage of their help, he had few funds, almost no television commercials, and little support from the Florida Democratic party establishment in a year that saw Republican gains everywhere. After the election, Rubin switched allegiance again and charged Rodham with election law violations in the first primary; the Federal Election Commission eventually dismissed the allegations.

General election results
Party	Candidate	Votes	%	±%
Republican	Connie Mack III (incumbent)	2,895,200	70.50%	+20.10%
Democratic	Hugh Rodham	1,210,577	29.48%	−20.12%
Write-in		1,039	0.02%	
Majority		1,684,623	41.02%	+40.22%
Total votes		4,106,816	100.00%	
Republican hold		Swing		

== Hawaii ==
Hawaii election
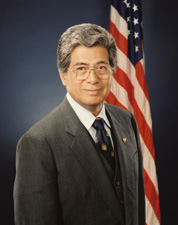

Nominee	Daniel Akaka	Maria Hustace
Party	Democratic	Republican
Popular vote	256,189	86,320
Percentage	71.8%	24.2%
- County results Akaka: 70–80%
U.S. senator before election
Daniel Akaka
Democratic
Elected U.S. senator
Daniel Akaka
Democratic

Democratic incumbent Daniel Akaka was first appointed to this seat April 1990 after the death of senator Spark Matsunaga. He won his first full term by defeating Republican cattle rancher Mary Hustace in a landslide.

1994 Hawaii United States Senate election
Party	Candidate	Votes	%
Democratic	Daniel Akaka (Incumbent)	256,189	71.8%
Republican	Maria Hustace	86,320	24.2%
Libertarian	Richard Rowland	14,393	4.0%
Majority			
Turnout			
Democratic hold			

== Indiana ==
Indiana election
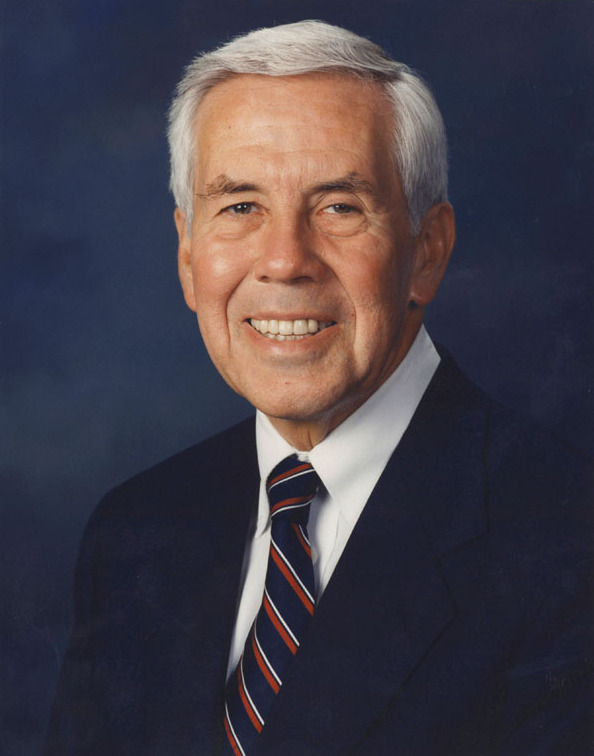

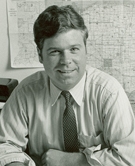
Nominee	Richard Lugar	Jim Jontz
Party	Republican	Democratic
Popular vote	1,039,625	470,799
Percentage	67.4%	30.5%
- County results Lugar: 50-60% 60-70% 70-80% 80-90% Jontz: 50–60%
U.S. senator before election
Richard Lugar
Republican
Elected U.S. senator
Richard Lugar
Republican

Three-term Republican incumbent Richard Lugar scored an overwhelming 37-point win against former Democratic Rep. Jim Jontz, who was attempting a comeback after losing re-election in 1992.

General election
Party	Candidate	Votes	%
Republican	Richard Lugar (Incumbent)	1,039,625	67.4%
Democratic	Jim Jontz	470,799	30.5%
Libertarian	Barbara Bourland	17,343	1.1%
New Alliance	Mary Catherine Barton	15,801	1.0%
Majority		568,826	
Turnout		1,543,568	
Republican hold			

Lugar won 91 of Indiana's 92 counties, Jontz won only the Democratic stronghold of Lake County.

== Maine ==
Maine election
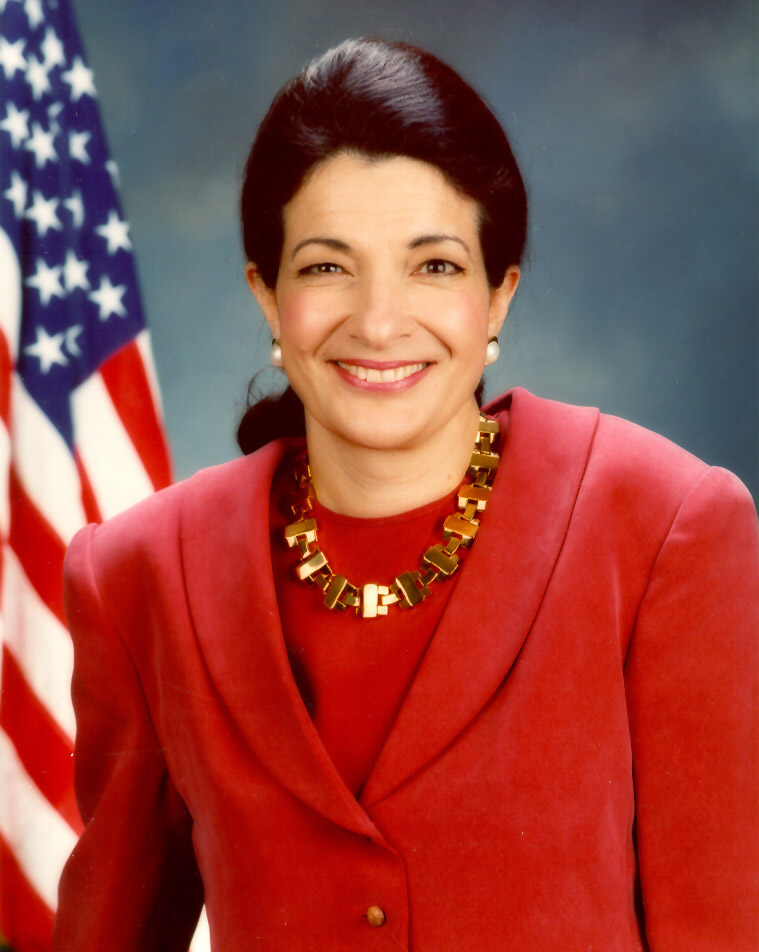

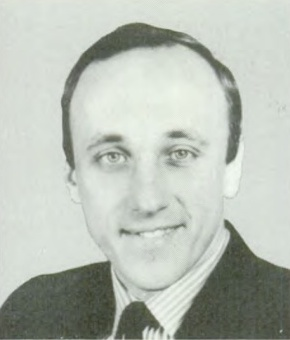
Nominee	Olympia Snowe	Tom Andrews
Party	Republican	Democratic
Popular vote	308,244	186,042
Percentage	60.24%	36.36%
- County results Snowe: 50–60% 60–70% 70–80%
U.S. senator before election
George J. Mitchell
Democratic
Elected U.S. senator
Olympia Snowe
Republican

One of the Republicans' biggest prizes was the seat of retiring Majority Leader George Mitchell. Longtime Congresswoman Olympia Snowe gained the seat in a landslide victory over Democratic Congressman Thomas Andrews, a stark contrast to retiring senator Mitchell's landslide win six years prior.

Democratic primary election
Party	Candidate	Votes	%
Democratic	Tom Andrews	82,339	99.83%
Democratic	Write-ins	140	0.17%
Total votes		82,479	100.00%

Republican primary election
Party	Candidate	Votes	%
Republican	Olympia Snowe	79,953	99.88%
Republican	Write-ins	93	0.12%
Total votes		80,046	100.00%

1994 United States Senate election in Maine
Party	Candidate	Votes	%	±%
Republican	Olympia Snowe	308,244	60.24%	+41.53%
Democratic	Tom Andrews	186,042	36.36%	−44.94%
Independent	Plato Truman	17,205	3.36%	
Write-ins		242	0.05%	
Majority		122,202	23.88%	−38.70%
Turnout		511,733		
Republican gain from Democratic		Swing		

== Maryland ==
Maryland election
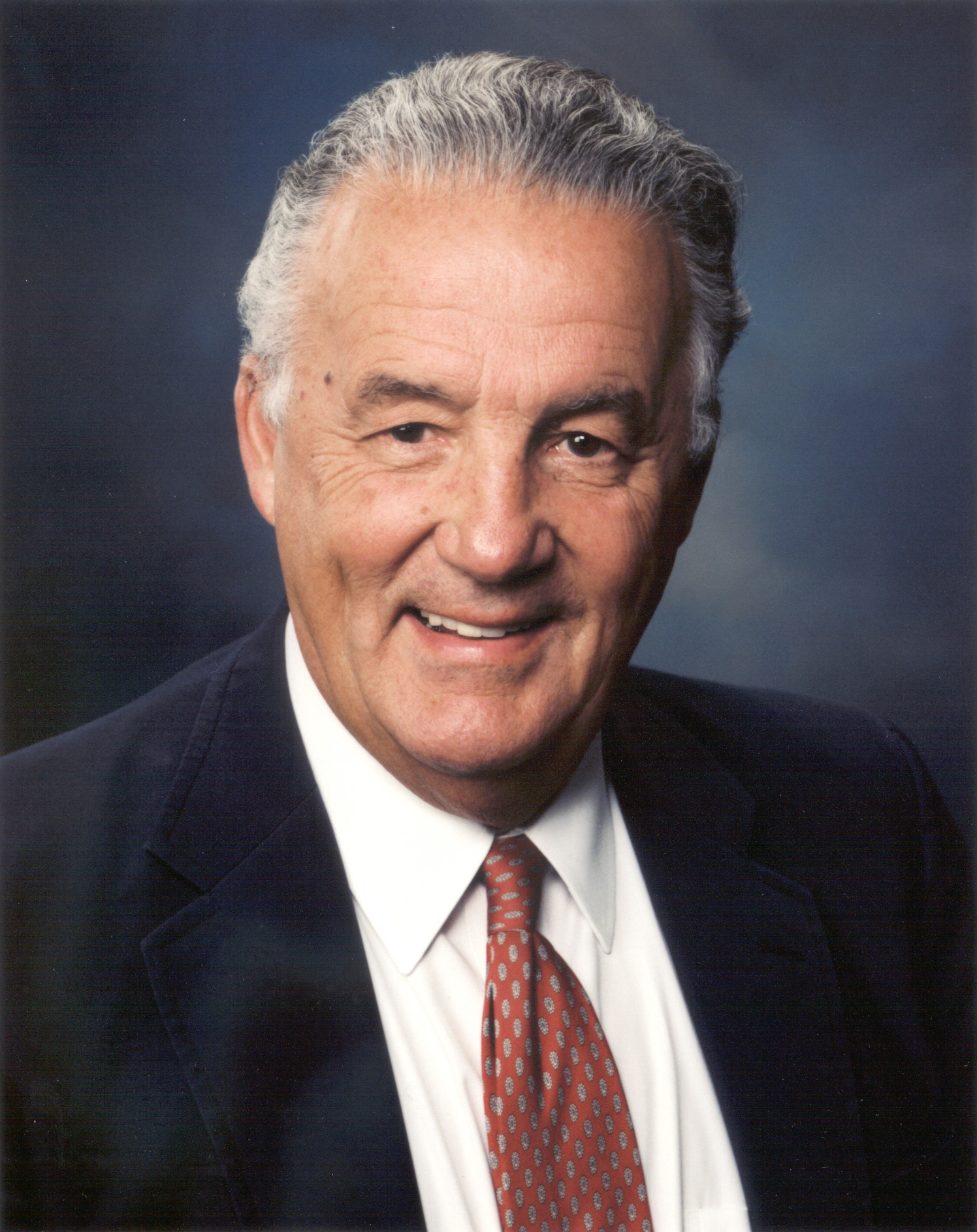

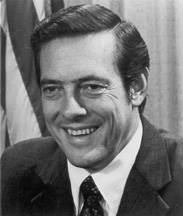
Nominee	Paul Sarbanes	Bill Brock
Party	Democratic	Republican
Popular vote	809,125	559,908
Percentage	59.1%	40.9%
- County results Sarbanes: 50–60% 60–70% 70–80% 80–90% Brock: 50–60%
U.S. senator before election
Paul S. Sarbanes
Democratic
Elected U.S. senator
Paul S. Sarbanes
Democratic

Democratic incumbent Paul Sarbanes won a third term by soundly defeating Republican Bill Brock, a former U.S. senator from Tennessee (1971–77), RNC chairman (1977–81), U.S. Trade Representative (1981–85) and U.S. Secretary of Labor (1985–87).

General election
Party	Candidate	Votes	%
Democratic	Paul Sarbanes (Incumbent)	809,125	59.1%
Republican	Bill Brock	559,908	40.9%
Independent	Terri Tilghman Deakyne (Write In)	71	0.0%
Majority		249,217	18.2%
Total votes		1,369,104	100.00%
Democratic hold			

== Massachusetts ==
Massachusetts election
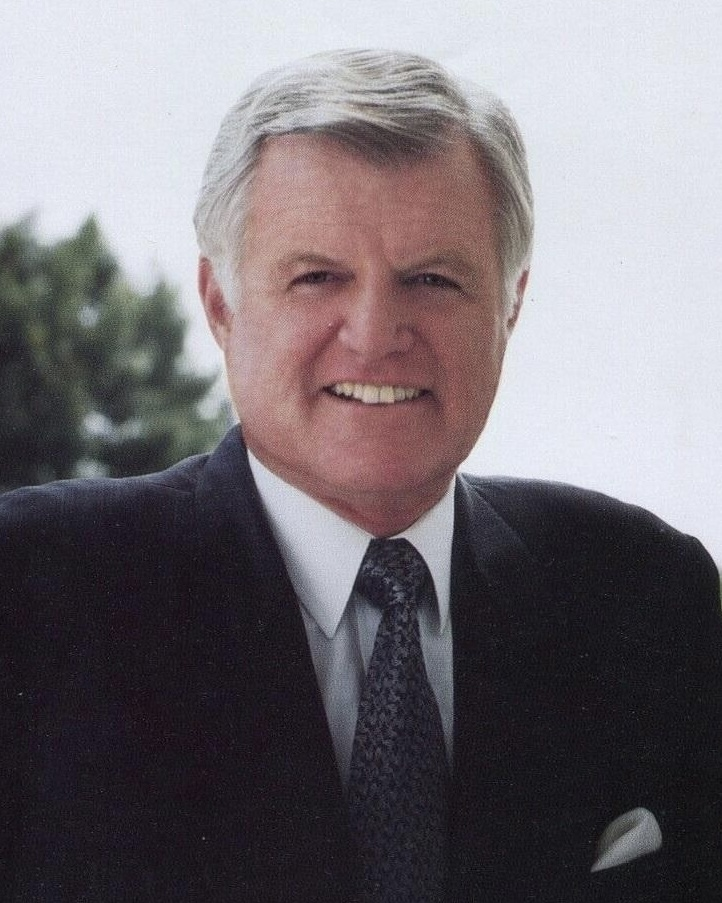

Nominee	Ted Kennedy	Mitt Romney
Party	Democratic	Republican
Popular vote	1,265,997	894,000
Percentage	58.1%	41.0%

Kennedy
40–50%
50–60%
60–70%
70–80%
80–90%
Romney
40–50%
50–60%
60–70%
U.S. senator before election
Ted Kennedy
Democratic
Elected U.S. senator
Ted Kennedy
Democratic

Ted Kennedy usually coasted to re-election, but in this election he faced an unusually tough challenge from Republican businessman Mitt Romney. Though the final result was a 17-point Kennedy victory, it marked the first time since his initial election in 1962 that Kennedy received less than 60% of the vote.

Romney defeated his closest competitor, John Lakian, to win the Republican primary with over 80% of the vote. He campaigned as a political moderate and Washington outsider, and posed the greatest challenge ever made against Kennedy for the Senate seat since he first took office in 1962. Democratic congressmen across the country were struggling to maintain their seats, and Kennedy in particular was damaged by character concerns and an ongoing divorce controversy. The contest became very close.

Kennedy launched ads criticizing Romney's tenure as the leader of the company known as Bain Capital, accusing him of treating workers unfairly and taking away jobs, while also criticizing what were widely considered to be Romney's shifting political views. Romney also performed inadequately in the debates between the two candidates, and made a number of poorly received statements that reduced his standing in the polls.

In the closest Senate election of his career since after 1962, Kennedy won by a reasonably comfortable margin, despite a series of losses for Democrats around the country.

Romney was initially behind businessman John Lakian in the battle to win the Massachusetts Republican Party's nomination for the U.S. Senate. However, after using his personal wealth to advertise heavily on television, he gained overwhelming support at the state party convention.

Romney then defeated Lakian easily in the September 1994 Republican Party primary with over 80 percent of the vote.

Massachusetts United States Senate Republican primary, 1994
Party	Candidate	Votes	%
Republican	Mitt Romney	188,280	82.04%
Republican	John Lakian	40,898	17.82%
	Others	318	0.14%
Total votes		229,496	100%

In the general election, Kennedy faced the first serious re-election challenger of his career in the younger, telegenic, and very well-funded Romney. Romney ran as a successful entrepreneur and Washington outsider with a strong family image and moderate stands on social issues. After two decades out of public view, his father George re-emerged during the campaign. George Romney had urged Mitt to enter the race and moved into his son's house for its duration, serving as an unofficial advisor.

Kennedy was more vulnerable than usual in 1994, in part because of the unpopularity of the Democratic Congress as a whole and also because this was Kennedy's first election since the William Kennedy Smith trial in Florida, in which Kennedy had taken some public relations hits regarding his character. Kennedy was saddled not only with his recent past but the 25th anniversary of the Chappaquiddick incident and his first wife Joan Bennett Kennedy seeking a renegotiated divorce settlement.

Some early polls showed Romney close to Kennedy. By mid-September 1994, polls showed the race to be even. One Boston Herald/WCVB-TV poll taken after the September 20, 1994 primary showed Romney ahead 44 percent to 42 percent, within the poll's sampling margin of error. In another September poll, Romney had a 43 to 42 percent lead. President Bill Clinton traveled to Massachusetts to campaign for Kennedy.

Religion became an issue for a while, after Kennedy's campaign said it was fair to ask Romney about his LDS Church's past policy of not allowing blacks into the priesthood. Romney accused Kennedy of having violated senator John F. Kennedy's famous September 1960 pledge not to allow his own Catholic doctrine to inform policy, made during his ultimately victorious presidential campaign. George Romney forcefully interjected during his son's press conference, "I think it is absolutely wrong to keep hammering on the religious issues. And what Ted is trying to do is bring it into the picture."

After Romney touted his business credentials and his record at creating jobs within his company, Kennedy ran campaign ads showing an Indiana company, Ampad, bought out by Romney's firm, Bain Capital. They showed interviews with its union workers who had been fired and who criticized Romney for the loss of their jobs, with one saying, "I don't think Romney is creating jobs because he took every one of them away." Romney claimed that 10,000 jobs were created because of his work at Bain, but private detectives hired by Kennedy found a factory bought by Bain Capital that had suffered a 350-worker strike after Bain had cut worker pay and benefits. Kennedy's charges were effective, as more voters decided that Romney was interested in profits more than people.

Kennedy's attack ads also focused both on Romney's shifting political views; although both Kennedy and Romney supported the abortion rights established under Roe v. Wade, Kennedy accused Romney of being "multiple choice" on the issue, rather than "pro choice." Romney said his stance dated back to his mother, Lenore Romney, and her position during her 1970 U.S. Senate campaign: "My mother and my family have been committed to the belief that we can believe as we want, but we will not force our beliefs on others on that matter. And you will not see me wavering on that." Nevertheless, women's groups and Democrats viewed Romney's position with suspicion. (In subsequent years, Romney became anti-abortion and opposed Roe.)

Kennedy's campaign ran short on money, and belying his image as endlessly wealthy, he was forced to take out a second mortgage on his Virginia home. Kennedy's new wife Vicki Reggie Kennedy proved to be a strong asset in campaigning.

By early October, Kennedy was ahead by 49 to 44 percent in a poll by The Boston Globe. In their first televised debate, held at Faneuil Hall on October 25, Kennedy came out charging with his aging but still booming voice; regarding the Ampad deal, he said to Romney, "I don't know why you wouldn't meet with the strikers with that flimflam deal of yours out there in Indiana." Romney charged that Kennedy had benefited from a real-estate deal that had been done on a no-bid basis, but Kennedy responded with a rehearsed line: "Mr. Romney, the Kennedys are not in public service to make money. We have paid too high a price in our commitment to the public service of this country." Each candidate was asked to discuss one of their own failings. In a dramatic moment, Kennedy indirectly referred to his personal problems and acknowledged that he was "painfully aware" that on such occasions he had let his supporters down. By contrast, Romney mentioned work for several local charities he was engaged with on a near daily basis. When the moderator reminded him of the question, Romney responded "I guess what I regret is that I'm not able to provide even more help for those less fortunate than myself.... I wish I could do even more." Kennedy won this key debate as he reconnected with his traditional bases of support: two polls of voters conducted afterwards both showed Kennedy as the victor in the debate. One post-debate October general election poll showed Kennedy leading 50 percent to 32, and another by 56 to 36 percent. A second debate, held two days later at Holyoke Community College, focused more on policy details and lacked the intensity of the first one; Romney failed to gain any traction from it.

In the November general election, despite a very bad result for Democrats overall, Kennedy won re-election by a 58 percent to 41 percent margin, the closest re-election race of his career; only his initial victory in the 1962 Senate special election in Massachusetts was closer.

1994 Massachusetts United States Senate election
Party	Candidate	Votes	%	±%
Democratic	Edward M. Kennedy (Incumbent)	1,265,997	58.07%	–6.90%
Republican	Mitt Romney	894,000	41.01%	+7.08%
Libertarian	Lauraleigh Dozier	14,484	0.66%	+0.15%
LaRouche Was Right	William A. Ferguson Jr.	4,776	0.22%	+0.22%
	Others	688	0.03%	+.02%
Total votes		2,179,945	100.00%	
Majority		371,997	17.06%	
Democratic hold		Swing		

== Michigan ==
Michigan election
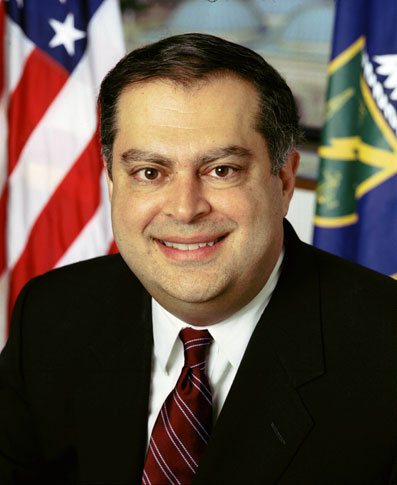

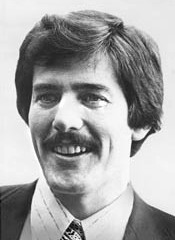
Nominee	Spencer Abraham	Bob Carr
Party	Republican	Democratic
Popular vote	1,578,770	1,300,960
Percentage	51.9%	42.7%
- County results Abraham: 40–50% 50–60% 60–70% 70–80% Carr: 40–50% 50–60%
U.S. senator before election
Don Riegle
Democratic
Elected U.S. senator
Spencer Abraham
Republican

Democratic senator Donald W. Riegle Jr. retired after three terms. Former Michigan Republican Party Chairman Spencer Abraham defeated Democratic Congressman Milton Robert Carr in the race to succeed Riegle.

Riegle, a three-term incumbent, was considered one of the most vulnerable Senate Democrats in the 1994 mid-term elections due to the unpopularity of President Bill Clinton and his being involved as a member of the Keating Five, a group of five senators who were accused of corruption. After months of speculation, Riegle announced he would not seek a 4th term in a speech on the Senate floor.

1994 United States Senate election in Michigan
Party	Candidate	Votes	%
Republican	Spencer Abraham	1,578,770	51.88
Democratic	Bob Carr	1,300,960	42.75
Libertarian	Jon Coon	128,393	4.22
Workers World	William Roundtree	20,010	0.66
Natural Law	Chris Wege	14,746	0.48
No party	Others	506	0.02
Majority		277,810	9.13
Total votes		3,043,385	100.00
Republican gain from Democratic			

== Minnesota ==
Minnesota election

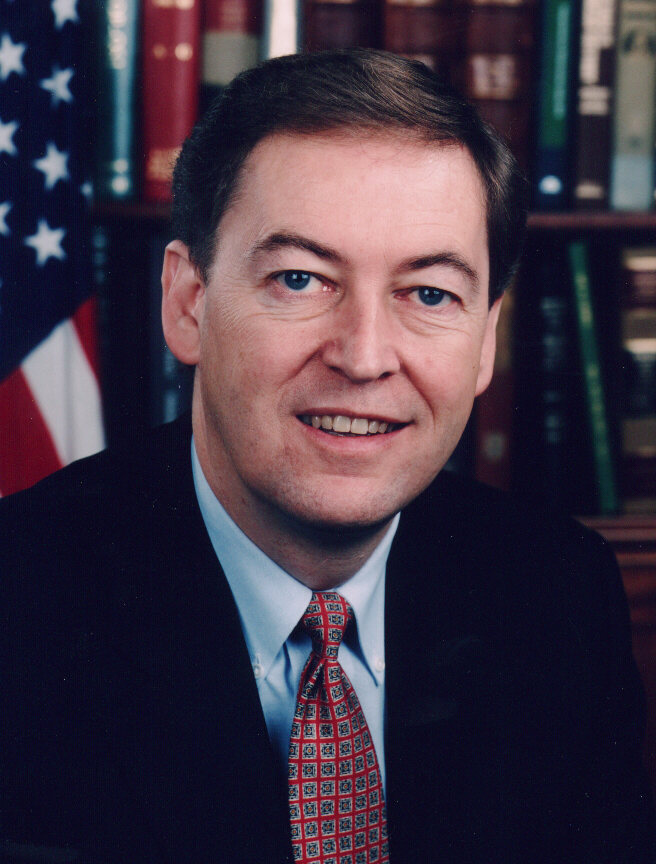

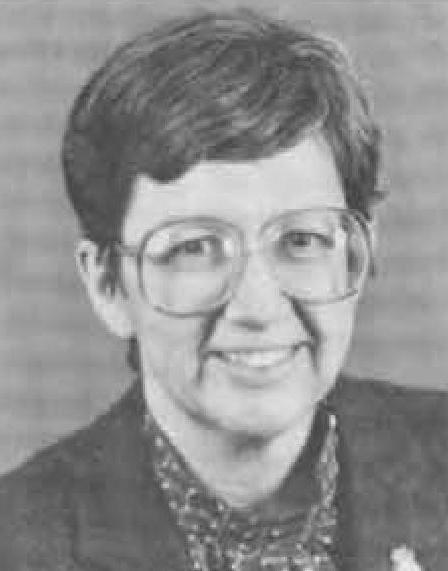

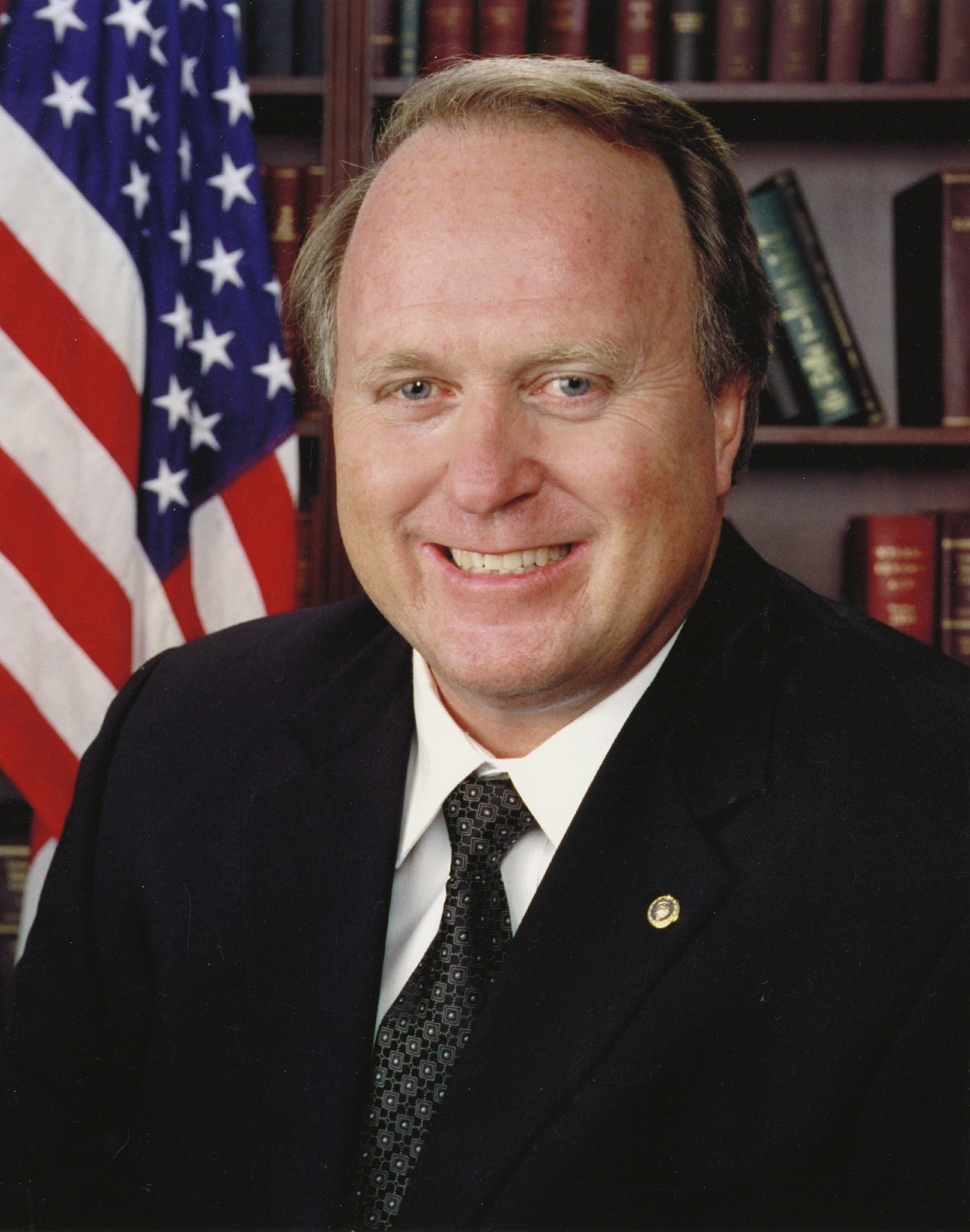
Nominee	Rod Grams	Ann Wynia
Party	Ind.-Republican	Democratic (DFL)
Popular vote	869,653	781,860
Percentage	49.1%	44.1%
Nominee	Dean Barkley
Party	Reform
Popular vote	95,400
Percentage	5.4%
- Grams: 40–50% 50–60% 60–70% Wynia: 40–50% 50–60%
U.S. senator before election
David Durenberger
Ind.-Republican
Elected U.S. senator
Rod Grams
Ind.-Republican

Incumbent Republican David Durenberger decided to retire instead of seeking a third full term. Republican Rod Grams won the open seat. After surviving a messy Republican primary, former TV news anchor and one-term Rep. Rod Grams defeated his Democratic opponent, former state assembly minority leader Ann Wynia by five points for the seat being vacated by incumbent Republican Dave Durenberger.

1994 United States Senate election in Minnesota
Party	Candidate	Votes	%
Republican	Rod Grams	869,653	49.05
Democratic	Ann Wynia	781,860	44.10
Independence	Dean Barkley	95,400	5.38
Independent	Candice E. Sjostrom	15,920	0.90
Natural Law	Stephen Johnson	5,054	0.29
Socialist Workers	Marea Himelgrin	2,428	0.14
No party	Write-ins	2,614	0.15
Majority		87,793	4.95
Total votes		1,772,929	100.00
Republican hold			

== Mississippi ==
Mississippi election
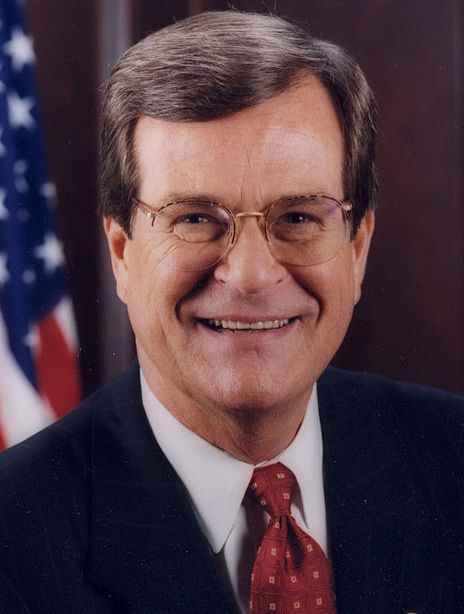

Nominee	Trent Lott	Ken Harper
Party	Republican	Democratic
Popular vote	418,333	189,752
Percentage	68.8%	31.2%
- County results Lott: 50–60% 60–70% 70–80% 80–90% Harper: 50–60% 60–70%
U.S. senator before election
Trent Lott
Republican
Elected U.S. senator
Trent Lott
Republican

Republican incumbent Trent Lott won a second term by easily defeating former Democratic state senator Ken Harper.

General election
Party	Candidate	Votes	%
Republican	Trent Lott (Incumbent)	418,333	68.8%
Democratic	Ken Harper	189,752	31.2%
Majority		228,581	37.6%
Total votes		608,085	100.00%
Republican hold			

== Missouri ==
Missouri election
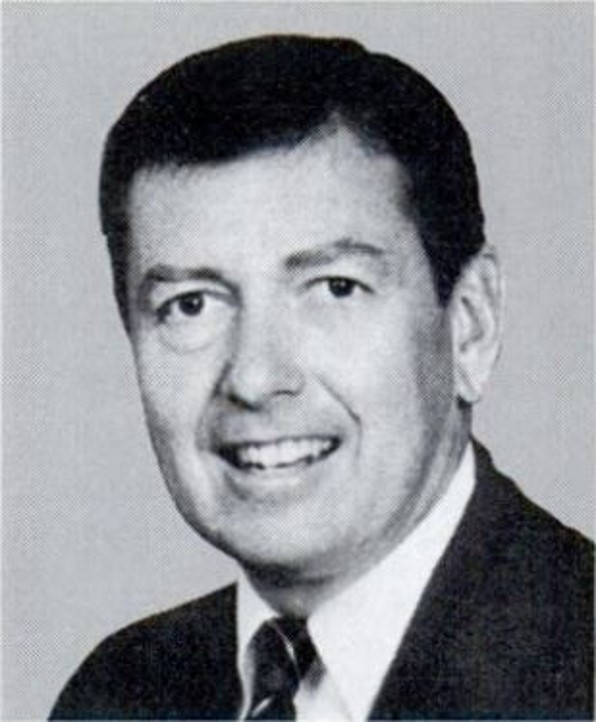

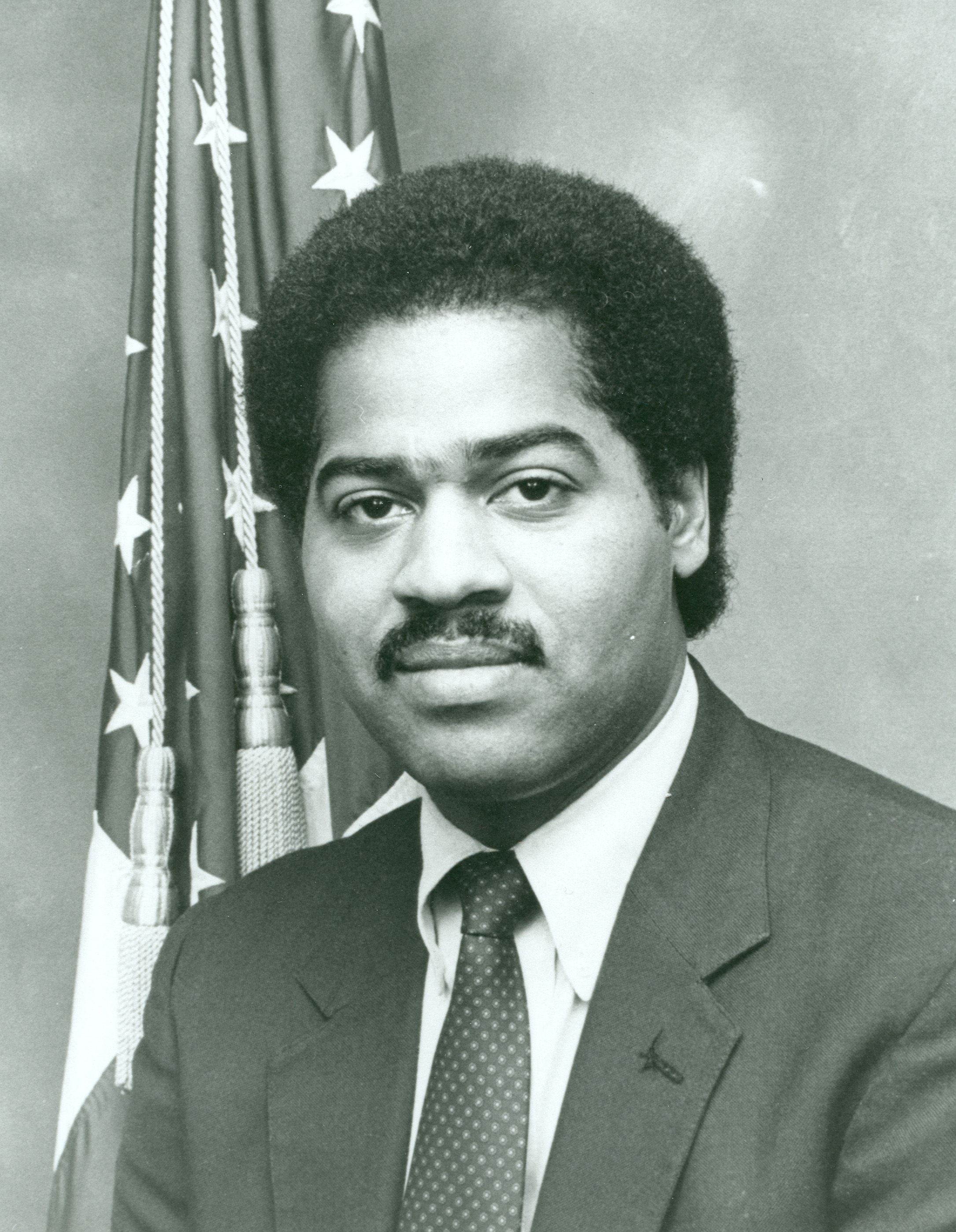
Nominee	John Ashcroft	Alan Wheat
Party	Republican	Democratic
Popular vote	1,060,149	633,697
Percentage	59.7%	35.7%
- County results Ashcroft: 40-50% 50-60% 60-70% 70-80% 80-90% Wheat: 60–70%
U.S. senator before election
John Danforth
Republican
Elected U.S. senator
John Ashcroft
Republican

Republican senator John Danforth retired after three terms. Former Republican Gov. John Ashcroft defeated his Democratic opponent, six-term Rep. Alan Wheat by more than twenty points.

1994 Missouri United States Senate election
Party	Candidate	Votes	%
Republican	John Ashcroft	1,060,149	59.72%
Democratic	Alan Wheat	633,697	35.70%
Libertarian	Bill Johnson	81,264	4.58%
	Write-In Votes	6	0.0%
Majority		426,452	24.02%
Turnout		1,775,116	
Republican hold			

== Montana ==
Montana election
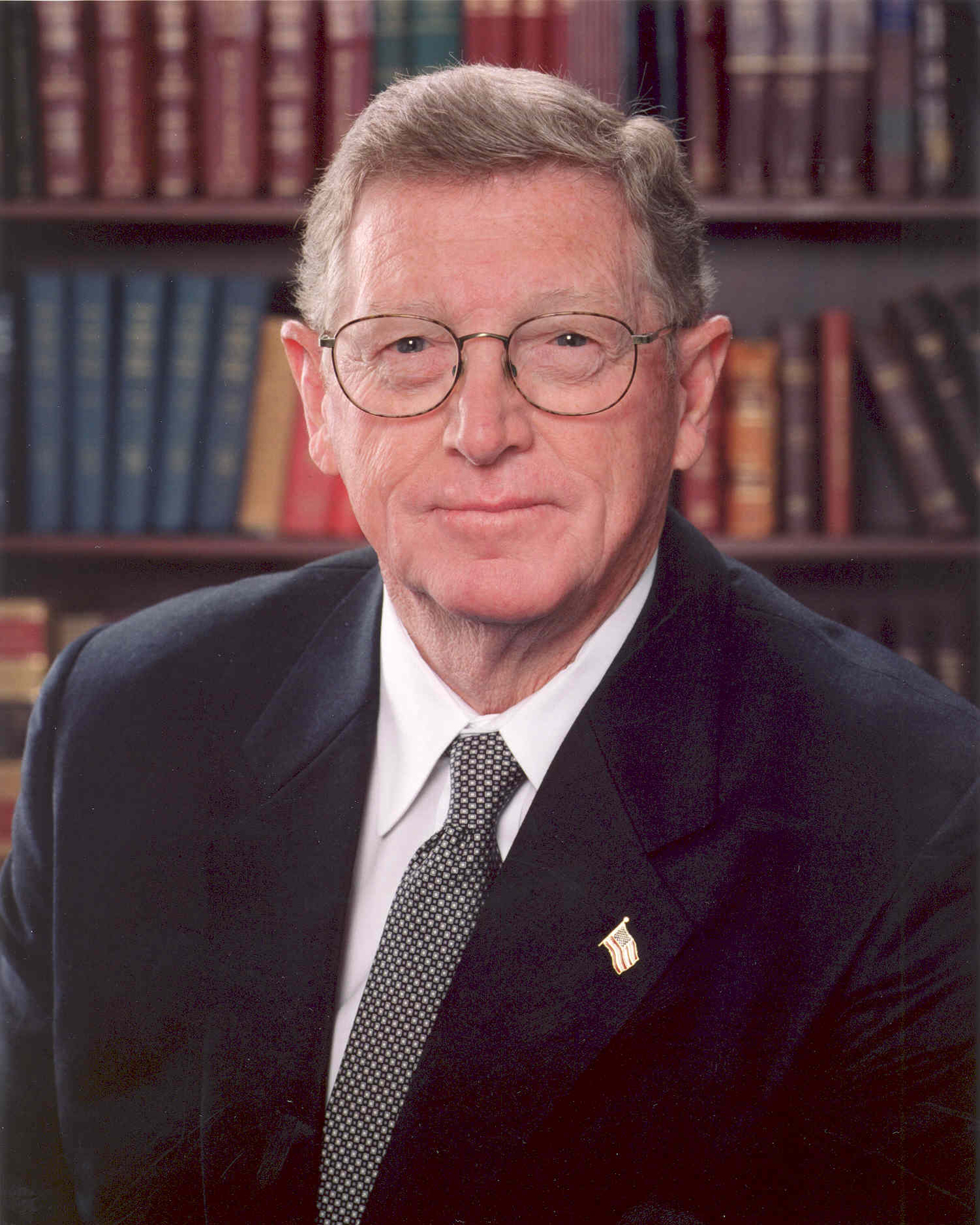

Nominee	Conrad Burns	Jack Mudd
Party	Republican	Democratic
Popular vote	218,542	131,845
Percentage	62.4%	37.6%
- County results Burns: 50–60% 60–70% 70–80% 80–90% >90% Mudd: 50–60%
U.S. senator before election
Conrad Burns
Republican
Elected U.S. senator
Conrad Burns
Republican

Democrat Jack Mudd, former dean of the University of Montana law school, defeated former U.S. senator John Melcher in the Democratic primary and then went on to lose to Republican incumbent Conrad Burns, who was seeking a second term.

Democratic primary election
Party	Candidate	Votes	%
Democratic	Jack Mudd	58,371	47.20%
Democratic	John Melcher	39,607	32.03%
Democratic	Becky Shaw	25,688	20.77%
Total votes		123,666	100.00%

Republican Party primary election
Party	Candidate	Votes	%
Republican	Conrad Burns (Incumbent)	82,827	100.00%
Total votes		82,827	100.00%

General election
Party	Candidate	Votes	%	±%
Republican	Conrad Burns (Incumbent)	218,542	62.37%	+10.50%
Democratic	Jack Mudd	131,845	37.63%	−10.50%
Majority		86,697	24.74%	21.01%
Turnout		350,387		
Republican hold		Swing		

== Nebraska ==
Nebraska election
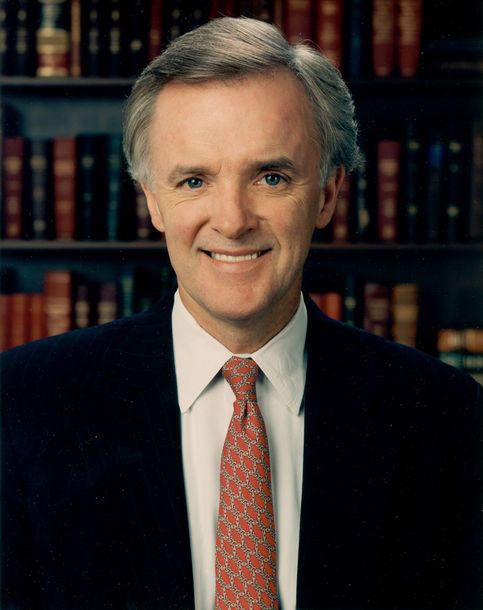

Nominee	Bob Kerrey	Jan Stoney
Party	Democratic	Republican
Popular vote	317,297	260,668
Percentage	54.8%	45.0%
- County results Kerrey: 50–60% 60–70% 70–80% Stoney: 50–60% 60–70% 70–80%
U.S. senator before election
Bob Kerrey
Democratic
Elected U.S. senator
Bob Kerrey
Democratic

Democrat Bob Kerrey won re-election over Republican Jan Stoney, Vice President of Personnel at Northwestern Bell, by ten points.

1994 Nebraska U.S. Senate Election
Party	Candidate	Votes	%
Democratic	Bob Kerrey (Incumbent)	317,297	54.78%
Republican	Jan Stoney	260,668	45.00%
Independent	Write Ins	1,240	0.21%
Majority		56,629	9.78%
Turnout		579,205	
Democratic hold			

== Nevada ==
Nevada election
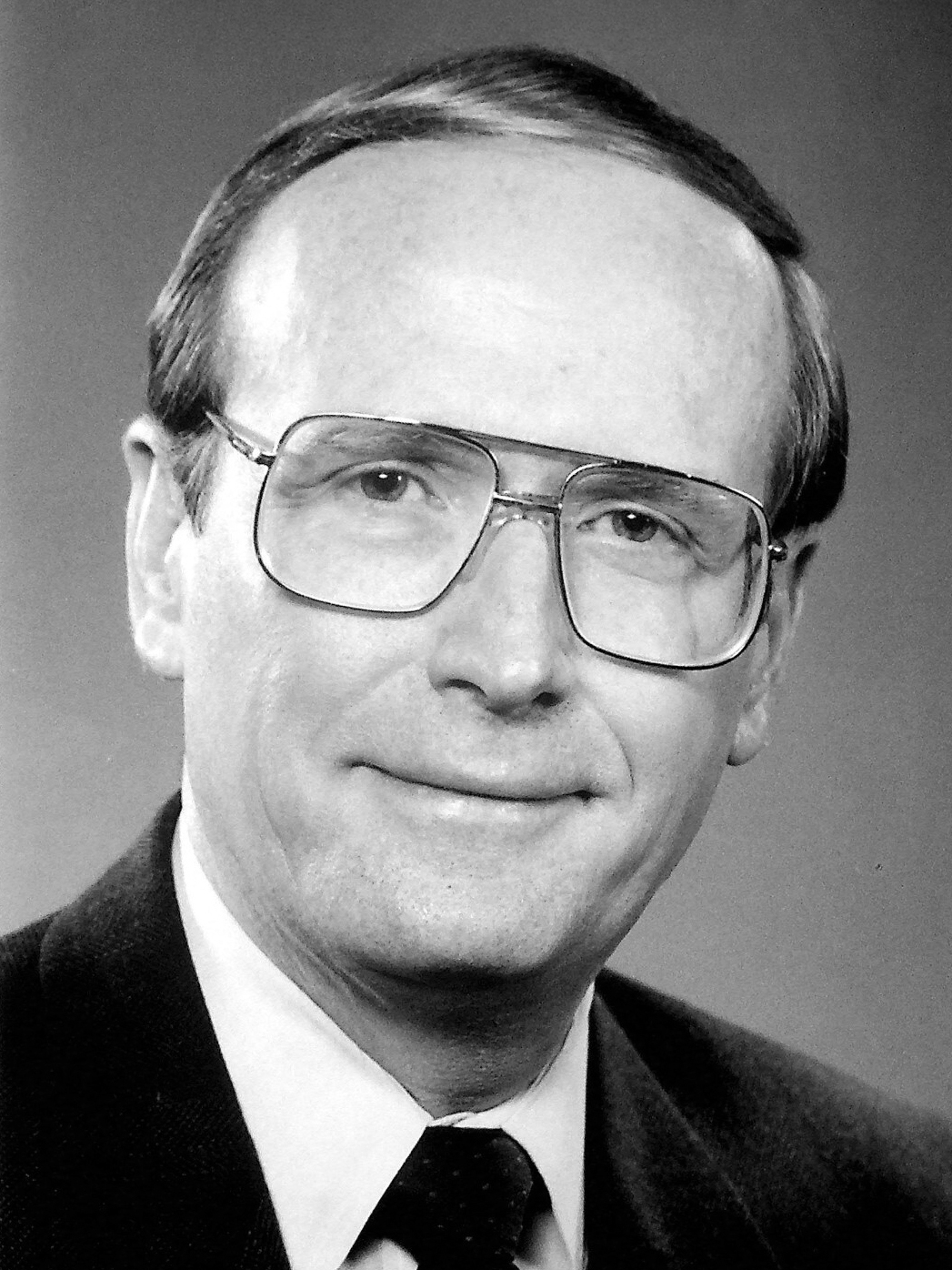

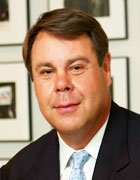
Nominee	Richard Bryan	Hal Furman
Party	Democratic	Republican
Popular vote	193,804	156,020
Percentage	50.9%	41.0%
- County results Bryan: 40–50% 50–60% Furman: 40–50% 50–60% 60–70%
U.S. senator before election
Richard Bryan
Democratic
Elected U.S. senator
Richard Bryan
Democratic

Democratic incumbent Richard H. Bryan scored a ten-point win over Republican Hal Furman, a water policy advisor for the Interior Department.

General election
Party	Candidate	Votes	%
Democratic	Richard Bryan (Incumbent)	193,804	50.9%
Republican	Hal Furman	156,020	41.0%
Independent	None of the Above	12,626	3.3%
Independent	Anna Nevenic	6,666	1.8%
Libertarian	Bob Days	5,964	1.6%
Independent	Neal A. Grasteit	5,450	1.4%
Majority		37,784	9.9%
Total votes		380,530	100.00%
Democratic hold			

== New Jersey ==
New Jersey election
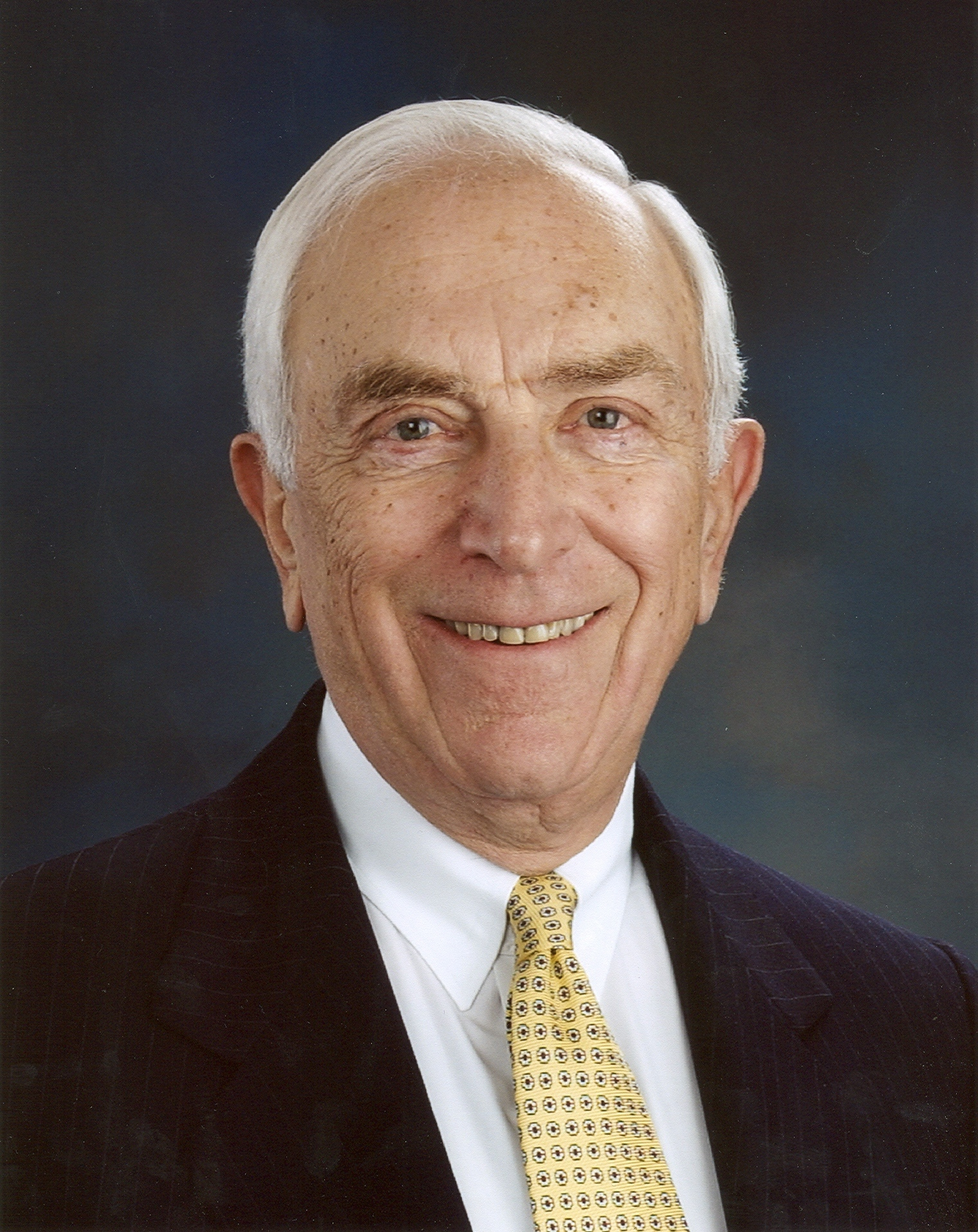

Nominee	Frank Lautenberg	Chuck Haytaian
Party	Democratic	Republican
Popular vote	1,033,487	966,244
Percentage	50.3%	47.0%
- Lautenberg: 40–50% 50–60% 60–70% Haytaian: 40–50% 50–60% 60–70%
U.S. senator before election
Frank Lautenberg
Democratic
Elected U.S. senator
Frank Lautenberg
Democratic

Two-term Democratic incumbent Frank Lautenberg narrowly defeated his Republican opponent, state assembly speaker Chuck Haytaian by three points.

General election results
Party	Candidate	Votes	%
Democratic	Frank Lautenberg (incumbent)	1,033,487	50.29%
Republican	Chuck Haytaian	966,244	47.02%
Independent	Michael P. Kelly	14,343	0.70%
Libertarian	Ben Grindlinger	14,042	0.68%
Conservative	Richard J. Pezzullo	9,387	0.46%
Independent	Andrea Lippi	6,303	0.31%
Independent	George Patrick Predham	4,226	0.21%
Socialist Workers	Joanne Kuniansky	3,606	0.18%
Natural Law	Arlene Gold	3,249	0.16%
Majority		67,243	3.27%
Total votes		2,054,887	100.00%
Democratic hold			

== New Mexico ==
New Mexico election
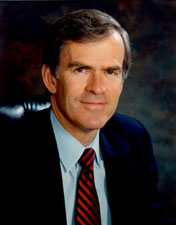

Nominee	Jeff Bingaman	Colin McMillan
Party	Democratic	Republican
Popular vote	249,989	213,025
Percentage	54.0%	46.0%
- County results Bingaman: 50–60% 60–70% 70–80% McMillan: 50–60% 60–70% 70–80%
U.S. senator before election
Jeff Bingaman
Democratic
Elected U.S. senator
Jeff Bingaman
Democratic

Two-term Democratic incumbent Jeff Bingaman defeated his Republican opponent, former George H. W. Bush Assistant Secretary of Defense Colin McMillan by eight points.

Democratic primary election
Party	Candidate	Votes	%
Democratic	Jeff Bingaman (Incumbent)	165,148	100.00%
Total votes		165,148	100.00%

Republican primary election
Party	Candidate	Votes	%
Republican	Colin R. McMillan	65,119	72.57%
Republican	Bill Turner	13,178	14.69%
Republican	Robin Dozier Otten	11,439	12.75%
Total votes		89,736	100.00%

General election
Party	Candidate	Votes	%	±%
Democratic	Jeff Bingaman (Incumbent)	249,989	53.97%	−9.34%
Republican	Colin R. McMillan	213,025	45.99%	+9.31%
Write-ins		182	0.04%	
Majority		36,964	7.98%	−18.64%
Turnout		463,196		
Democratic hold		Swing		

== New York ==
New York election
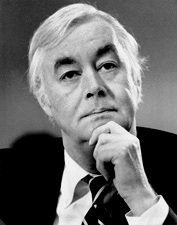

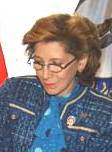
Nominee	Pat Moynihan	Bernadette Castro
Party	Democratic	Republican
Popular vote	2,646,541	1,988,308
Percentage	55.3%	41.5%
- County results Moynihan: 40–50% 50–60% 60–70% 70–80% 80–90% Castro: 40–50% 50–60% 60–70%
U.S. senator before election
Pat Moynihan
Democratic
Elected U.S. senator
Pat Moynihan
Democratic

Veteran Democratic incumbent Daniel Patrick Moynihan easily defeated his Republican opponent, businesswoman Bernadette Castro.

1994 was significant for the Republican Revolution, mostly as a referendum against President Bill Clinton and his health care plan, and was seen as a tough year for Democratic incumbents. Moynihan, however, was New York State's most popular politician at the time, and ran ahead of all other Democrats competing statewide.

Republican Castro was running for office for the first time and had trouble raising funds due to being seen as unlikely to win; at times during the race she trailed by up to 30 percentage points. She portrayed herself as a fiscally conservative, socially moderate Republican in the mold of Governor of New Jersey Christie Todd Whitman, and attempted to portray Moynihan as excessively liberal and prone to government spending. But Moynihan repeated his past strong performance among upstate voters, in addition to the usual Democratic strongholds in New York City.

General election
Party	Candidate	Votes	%
Democratic	Daniel Patrick Moynihan (Incumbent)	2,646,541	55.3%
Republican	Bernadette Castro	1,988,308	41.5%
Right to Life	Henry Hewes	95,954	2.0%
Independence Fusion	Ismael Betancourt Jr.	26,650	0.6%
Libertarian	Norma Segal	17,991	0.4%
Socialist Workers	Naomi Craine	14,892	0.3%
Majority		658,233	13.8%
Total votes		4,790,336	100.00%
Democratic hold			

== North Dakota ==
North Dakota election
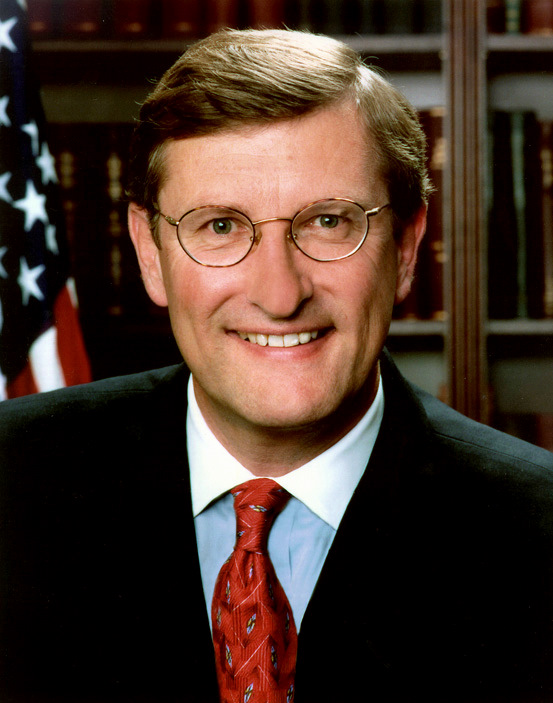

Nominee	Kent Conrad	Ben Clayburgh
Party	Democratic	Republican
Popular vote	137,157	99,390
Percentage	58.0%	42.0%
- County results Conrad: 50–60% 60–70% 70–80% Clayburgh: 50–60%
U.S. senator before election
Kent Conrad
Democratic
Elected U.S. senator
Kent Conrad
Democratic

Incumbent Dem-NPL-er Kent Conrad won re-election to his first full term as senior senator, although technically his second third in the position, having served the end of Quentin Burdick's term after his death. Conrad also had served an additional term as senator, but as junior senator from 1986 to 1992.

General election results
Party	Candidate	Votes	%
Democratic	Kent Conrad (Incumbent)	137,157	57.98%
Republican	Ben Clayburgh	99,390	42.02%
Majority		37,767	15.96%
Total votes		236,547	100.00%
Democratic hold			

== Ohio ==
Ohio election
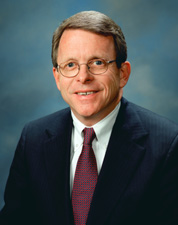

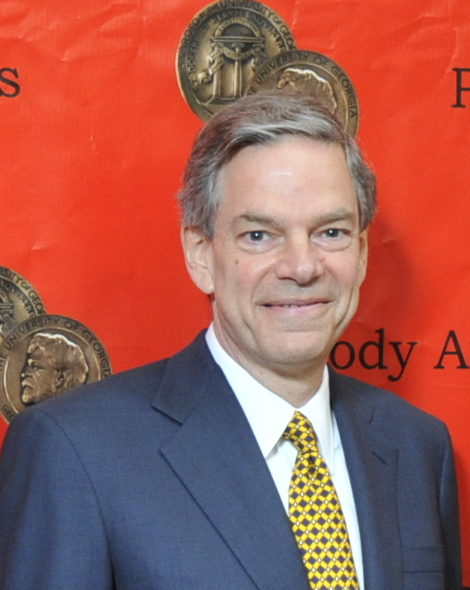
Nominee	Mike DeWine	Joel Hyatt
Party	Republican	Democratic
Popular vote	1,836,556	1,348,213
Percentage	53.4%	39.2%
Nominee	Joseph Slovenec
Party	Independent
Popular vote	252,031
Percentage	7.3%
- County results DeWine: 40–50% 50–60% 60–70% 70–80% Hyatt: 40–50% 50–60% 60–70%
U.S. senator before election
Howard Metzenbaum
Democratic
Elected U.S. senator
Mike DeWine
Republican

Senator Howard Metzenbaum retired and his son-in-law Joel Hyatt received the Democratic nomination to succeed him. Hyatt would go on to be badly defeated by Lieutenant Governor Mike DeWine.

Ohio United States Senate Election, 1994
Party	Candidate	Votes	%	±%
Republican	Mike DeWine	1,836,556	53.4%	+10.1%
Democratic	Joel Hyatt	1,348,213	39.2%	−17.2%
Independent	Joe Slovenec	252,031	7.3%	+0.00%
Majority		488,343	14.2%	
Turnout		3,436,800		
Republican gain from Democratic		Swing		

== Oklahoma (special) ==
1994 United States Senate special election in Oklahoma
- November 8, 1994
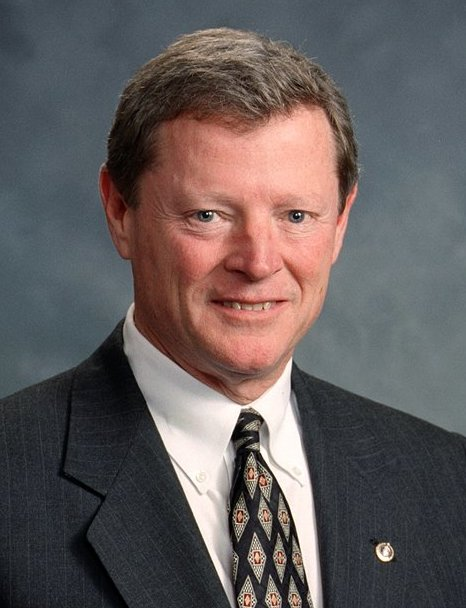

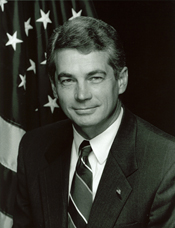
Nominee	Jim Inhofe	Dave McCurdy
Party	Republican	Democratic
Popular vote	542,390	392,488
Percentage	55.2%	40.0%
- County results Inhofe: 40-50% 50-60% 60-70% 70-80% McCurdy: 40–50% 50–60% 60–70%
U.S. senator before election
David L. Boren
Democratic
Elected U.S. senator
Jim Inhofe
Republican

Incumbent Democrat David L. Boren decided to resign his position to accept the position as President of the University of Oklahoma, which prompted a special election. Republican Congressman Jim Inhofe defeated the Democratic Congressman Dave McCurdy.

General election
Party	Candidate	Votes	%
Republican	Jim Inhofe	542,390	55.21%
Democratic	Dave McCurdy	392,488	39.95%
Independent	Danny Corn	47,552	4.84%
Majority		149,902	15.26%
Turnout		982,430	
Republican hold			

== Pennsylvania ==
Pennsylvania election
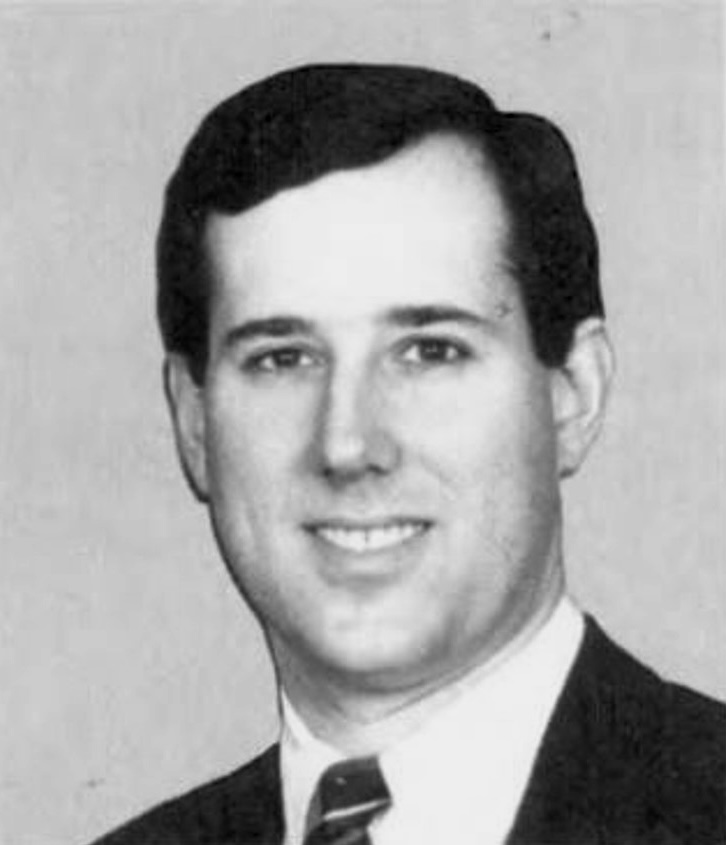

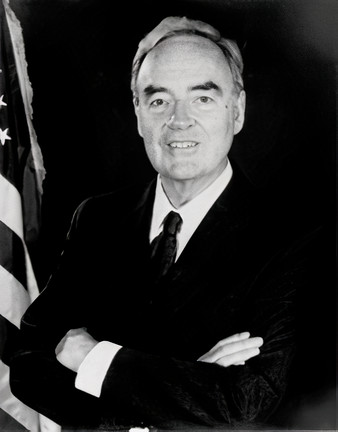
Nominee	Rick Santorum	Harris Wofford
Party	Republican	Democratic
Popular vote	1,735,691	1,648,481
Percentage	49.4%	46.9%
- Santorum: 40–50% 50–60% 60–70% 70–80% 80–90% >90% Wofford: 40–50% 50–60% 60–70% 70–80% 80–90% >90% Tie: 30–40% 40–50% 50% No data
U.S. senator before election
Harris Wofford
Democratic
Elected U.S. senator
Rick Santorum
Republican

Democrat Harris Wofford was appointed to the Senate when three-term Republican H. John Heinz III died in a 1991 plane crash. He won a special election to hold that seat later that year. In his tough re-election against Republican Congressman Rick Santorum, the pro-choice Wofford lost the endorsement of anti-abortion Democratic Governor Robert Casey. This contributed to his loss to Santorum by two percentage points.

Wofford's campaign was hurt from the outset by his strong connection with President Bill Clinton's failed healthcare reform proposals; Wofford had made working toward universal healthcare a crucial issue in his prior campaign and was one of the executive's strongest allies on the issue. After this failure, however, the senator ran a relatively passive campaign. He instead attempted to focus attention on his challenger, an arch-conservative who did not attempt to moderate his views after the primary election. The polarizing Santorum took strong positions against abortion, gay rights, and affirmative action, and he even clashed with some of the traditional fixtures of the state's moderate Republican establishment. Early in the campaign and with little statewide name recognition, Santorum made a critical error by attacking Social Security, and Wofford appeared to be in relatively safe position. However, Santorum ran an effective grassroots campaign and specifically targeted many union Democrats who had reservations about the liberal social values advocated by many of their party's leaders.

In the closing weeks of the campaign, Santorum was greatly helped by strong Republican enthusiasm because of anger over Clinton's failed initiatives. He solidified his status by running a series of positive ads that attempted to define his character strengths and to contrast with Wofford's negative commercials. Santorum eventually received a close victory by performing well (and nearly winning) his home in the suburban Pittsburgh region and through particularly low turnout in Democratic strongholds, such as Philadelphia, Scranton, and Pittsburgh cities.

General election
Party	Candidate	Votes	%	±%
Republican	Rick Santorum	1,735,691	49.40%	+4.41%
Democratic	Harris Wofford (Incumbent)	1,648,481	46.92%	−8.09%
Patriot Party	Diane G. Blough	69,825	1.99%	+1.99%
Libertarian	Donald Ernsberger	59,115	1.68%	+1.68%
N/A	Write-In Votes	249	0.01%	+0.01%
Majority		87,210	2.48%	−7.53%
Total votes		3,513,361		
Republican gain from Democratic		Swing		

== Rhode Island ==
Rhode Island election
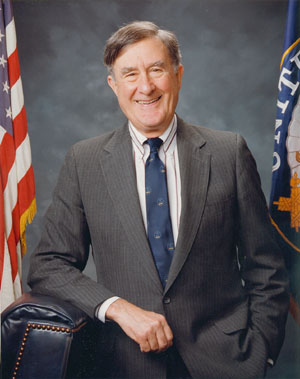

Nominee	John Chafee	Linda Kushner
Party	Republican	Democratic
Popular vote	222,856	122,532
Percentage	64.5%	34.5%
- Chafee: 50–60% 60–70% 70–80%
U.S. senator before election
John Chafee
Republican
Elected U.S. senator
John Chafee
Republican

Moderate Republican incumbent John Chafee, seeking a fourth term, defeated Democratic state representative Linda Kushner by 28-points.

Republican primary election
Party	Candidate	Votes	%
Republican	John Chafee (Incumbent)	27,906	69.03%
Republican	Robert A. Post Jr.	12,517	30.97%
Total votes		40,423	100.00%

General election
Party	Candidate	Votes	%	±%
Republican	John Chafee (Incumbent)	222,856	64.52%	+9.93%
Democratic	Linda Kushner	122,532	35.48%	−9.93%
Majority		100,324	29.05%	+19.86%
Turnout		345,388		
Republican hold		Swing		

== Tennessee ==
Due to the resignation of Al Gore in 1993 to become vice president, there were two senate elections in Tennessee as both seats were up for election.

=== Tennessee (regular) ===
Tennessee general election
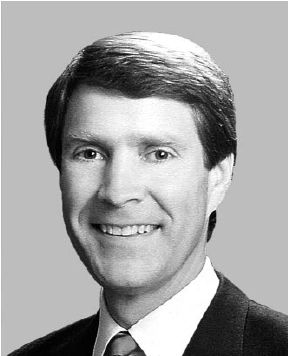

Nominee	Bill Frist	Jim Sasser
Party	Republican	Democratic
Popular vote	834,226	623,164
Percentage	56.4%	42.1%
- County results Frist: 40–50% 50–60% 60–70% 70–80% Sasser: 40–50% 50–60% 60–70%
U.S. senator before election
Jim Sasser
Democratic
Elected U.S. senator
Bill Frist
Republican

One of the biggest upsets of the night was the defeat of three-term Democrat Jim Sasser. Sasser had been the influential Chairman of the Budget Committee and was among the leading candidates to replace Mitchell as Democratic Floor Leader. Sasser, however, would be defeated by prominent Nashville heart surgeon Bill Frist by 14 points.

There were two unforeseen events that affected the campaign. One was the large scale of discontent that the American people seemed to have toward the first two years of the Clinton administration, especially the proposal for a national healthcare system largely put together and advocated by Clinton's wife, Hillary Clinton. The other was the somewhat unexpected nomination of Nashville heart transplant surgeon Bill Frist for the seat by the Republicans.

Frist, who had never voted until he was 36, was a political unknown and a total novice at campaigning, but was from one of Nashville's most prominent and wealthiest medical families, which gave him some name recognition, as well as adequate enough resources to match the campaign war chest built up by the three-term incumbent, a challenge most "insurgent" candidates find to be impossible. A further factor working to Frist's advantage was a simultaneous Republican campaign by actor and attorney Fred Thompson for the other Tennessee Senate seat, which was open due to Al Gore resigning to become Vice President of the United States.

In one of the largest upsets in a night of political upsets in the November 1994 U.S. general elections, Frist defeated the incumbent Sasser by approximately 14 percentage points.

General election results
Party	Candidate	Votes	%
Republican	Bill Frist	834,226	56.35%
Democratic	Jim Sasser (Incumbent)	623,164	42.10%
Independent	John Jay Hooker	13,244	0.90%
Independent	Charles F. Johnson	6,631	0.45%
Independent	Philip Kienlen	3,087	0.21%
	Write-In Candidates	39	0.00%
Majority		211,062	14.26%
Turnout		1,480,391	
Republican gain from Democratic			

=== Tennessee (special) ===
Tennessee special election
- November 8, 1994
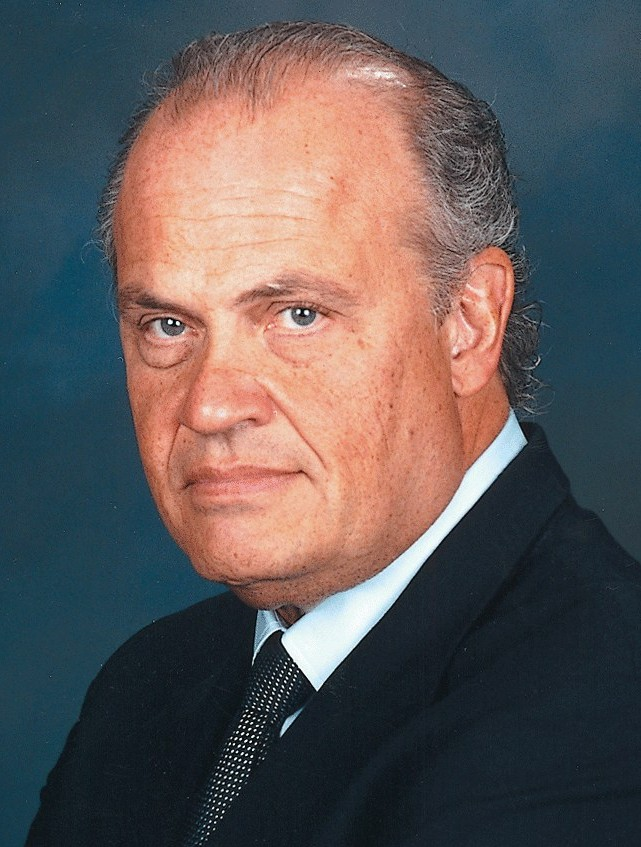

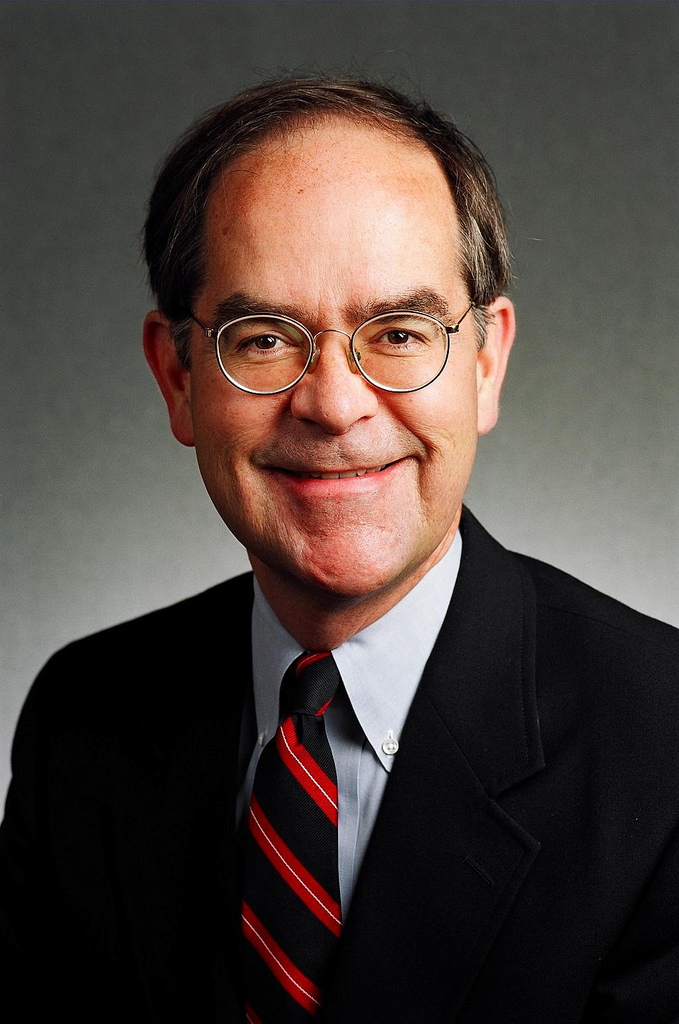
Nominee	Fred Thompson	Jim Cooper
Party	Republican	Democratic
Popular vote	885,998	565,930
Percentage	60.4%	38.6%
- County results Thompson: 40–50% 50–60% 60–70% 70–80% Cooper: 50–60% 60–70%
U.S. senator before election
Harlan Mathews
Democratic
Elected U.S. senator
Fred Thompson
Republican

Less surprising was the Republican victory in the other Tennessee Senate contest. Harlan Matthews had held the seat since Al Gore's resignation to assume the Vice Presidency in 1993, but chose not to seek the Democratic nomination in the special election. The Republican actor and attorney Fred Thompson, defeated six-term Democratic Congressman Jim Cooper in an overwhelming landslide.

General election
Party	Candidate	Votes	%	±%
Republican	Fred Thompson	885,998	60.44%	+30.63%
Democratic	Jim Cooper	565,930	38.61%	−29.12%
Independent	Charles N. Hancock	4,169	0.28%	
Independent	Charles Moore	2,219	0.15%	
Independent	Terry Lytle	1,934	0.13%	
Independent	Kerry Martin	1,719	0.12%	
Independent	Jon Walls	1,532	0.10%	
Independent	Hobart Lumpkin	1,184	0.08%	
Independent	Don Schneller	1,150	0.08%	
Write-ins		27	0.00%	
Majority		320,068	21.83%	−16.08%
Turnout		1,465,862		
Republican gain from Democratic				

== Texas ==
Texas election
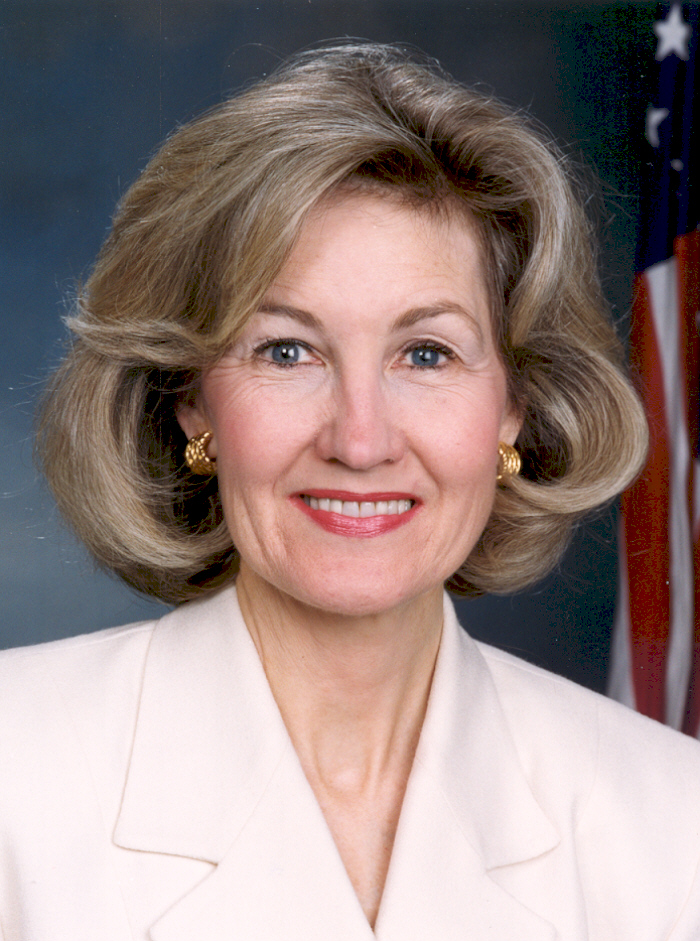

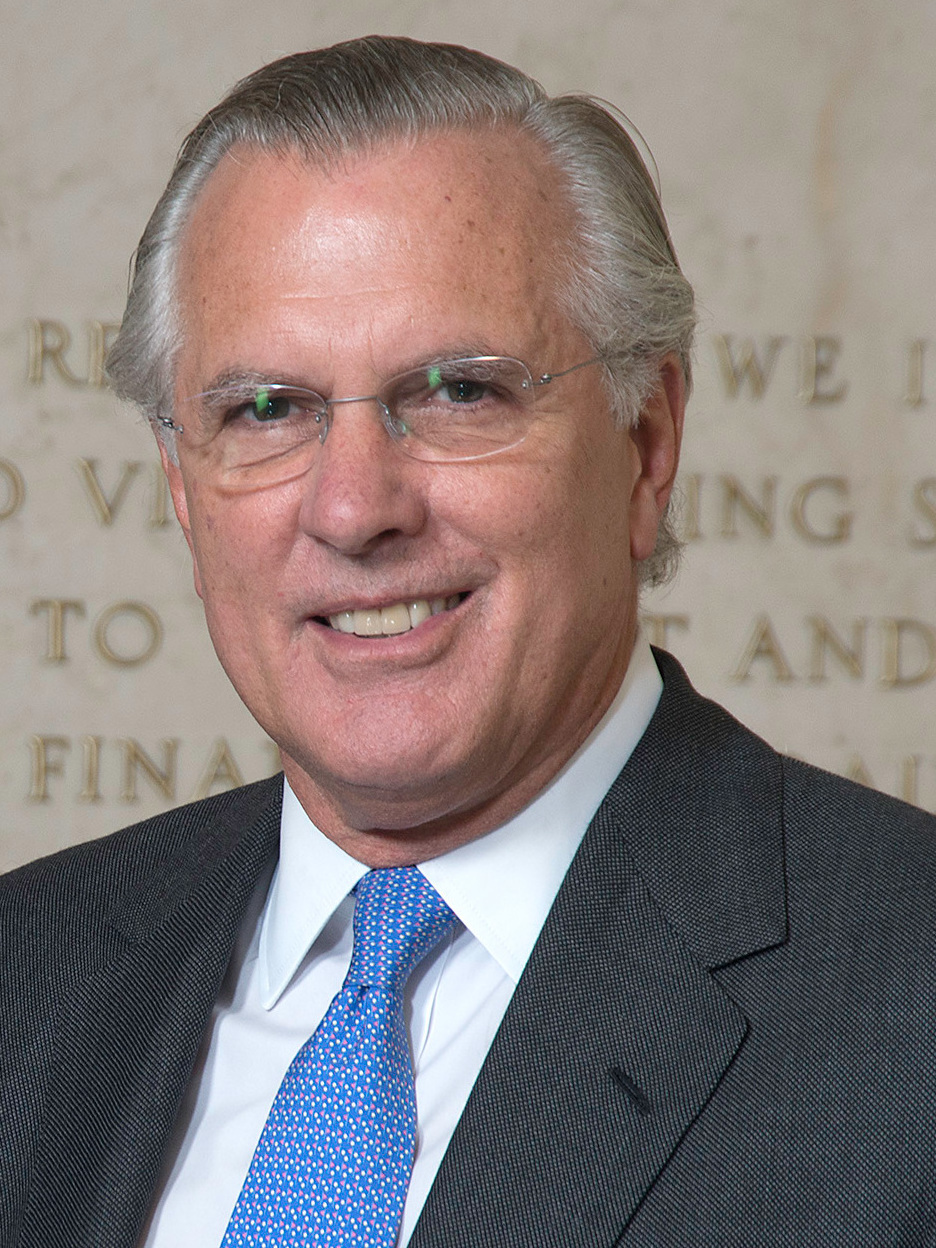
Nominee	Kay Bailey Hutchison	Richard W. Fisher
Party	Republican	Democratic
Popular vote	2,604,218	1,639,615
Percentage	60.8%	38.3%
- County results Hutchison: 40-50% 50–60% 60–70% 70–80% 80–90% >90% Fisher: 40–50% 50–60% 60–70% 70–80% 80–90% Tie: 50–60%
U.S. senator before election
Kay Bailey Hutchison
Republican
Elected U.S. senator
Kay Bailey Hutchison
Republican

Republican Kay Bailey Hutchison, having just won a special election the previous June for the seat vacated by Democrat Lloyd Bentsen, easily defeated Democrat Richard W. Fisher, an investment banker who had defeated for Texas Attorney General Jim Mattox in the Democratic primary.

General election results
Party	Candidate	Votes	%
Republican	Kay Bailey Hutchison (incumbent)	2,604,218	60.85%
Democratic	Richard W. Fisher	1,639,615	38.31%
Libertarian	Pierre Blondeau	36,107	0.84%
Total votes		4,279,940	100.00%
Majority		964,603	22.54%
Republican hold			

== Utah ==
Utah election
- November 8, 1994
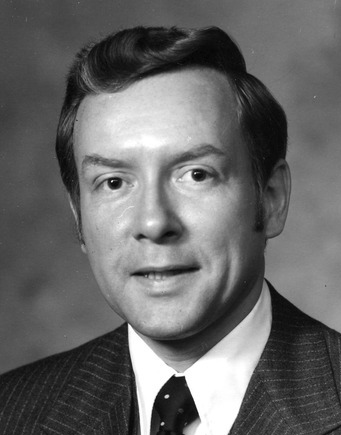

Nominee	Orrin Hatch	Patrick A. Shea
Party	Republican	Democratic
Popular vote	357,297	146,938
Percentage	68.80%	28.30%
- County results Hatch: 50-60% 60-70% 70-80% 80-90% Shea: 50–60%
U.S. senator before election
Orrin Hatch
Republican
Elected U.S. senator
Orrin Hatch
Republican

Veteran Republican incumbent Orrin Hatch delivered a 40-point defeat to his Democratic opponent, attorney Patrick Shea.

General election
Party	Candidate	Votes	%	±%
Republican	Orrin Hatch (Incumbent)	357,297	68.80%	
Democratic	Patrick A. Shea	146,938	28.30%	
Independent	Craig Oliver	9,550	1.84%	
American	Gary Van Horn	2,543	0.49%	
Socialist Workers	Nelson Gonzalez	1,514	0.29%	
Independent American	Lawrence Topham	1,462	0.48%	
Majority		210,359	40.50%	{{{change}}}
Turnout		519,304		{{{change}}}
Republican hold		Swing		

== Vermont ==
Vermont election
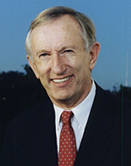

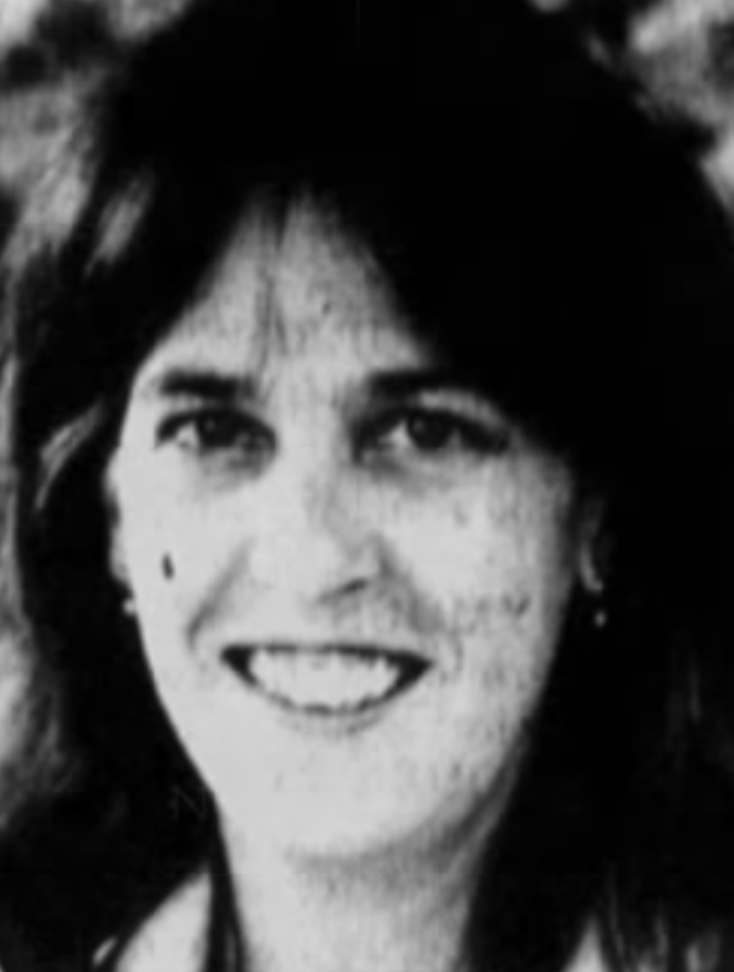
Nominee	Jim Jeffords	Jan Backus
Party	Republican	Democratic
Popular vote	106,505	85,868
Percentage	50.3%	40.6%
Nominee	Gavin T. Mills
Party	Independent
Popular vote	12,465
Percentage	5.9%
- Jeffords: 30–40% 40–50% 50–60% 60–70% 70–80% 80–90% Backus: 40–50% 50–60% 60–70%
U.S. senator before election
Jim Jeffords
Republican
Elected U.S. senator
Jim Jeffords
Independent

Moderate Republican Jim Jeffords won a second term, defeating Democratic state senator Jan Backus and independent Gavin Mills. He won every county in the state.

Democratic primary election
Party	Candidate	Votes	%
Democratic	Jan Backus	16,217	53.65%
Democratic	Doug Costle	13,139	43.46%
Democratic	Write-ins	873	2.89%
Total votes		30,229	100.00%

Republican primary election
Party	Candidate	Votes	%
Republican	Jim Jeffords (Incumbent)	24,795	91.56%
Republican	Write-ins	2,285	8.44%
Total votes		27,080	100.00%

Liberty Union primary election
Party	Candidate	Votes	%
Liberty Union	Jerry Levy	289	90.03%
Liberty Union	Write-ins	32	9.97%
Total votes		321	100.00%

General election
Party	Candidate	Votes	%	±%
Republican	Jim Jeffords (Incumbent)	106,505	50.32%	−17.65%
Democratic	Jan Backus	85,868	40.57%	+10.80%
Independent	Gavin T. Mills	12,465	5.89%	
Independent	Matthew S. Mulligan	3,141	1.48%	
Grassroots	Bob Melamede	1,416	0.67%	
Liberty Union	Jerry Levy	1,376	0.65%	−0.40%
Natural Law	Joseph Victor Pardo	709	0.33%	
Write-ins		192	0.09%	
Majority		20,637	9.75%	−28.45%
Turnout		211,672		
Republican hold		Swing		

== Virginia ==
Virginia election
- Turnout: 43.6% (voting eligible)
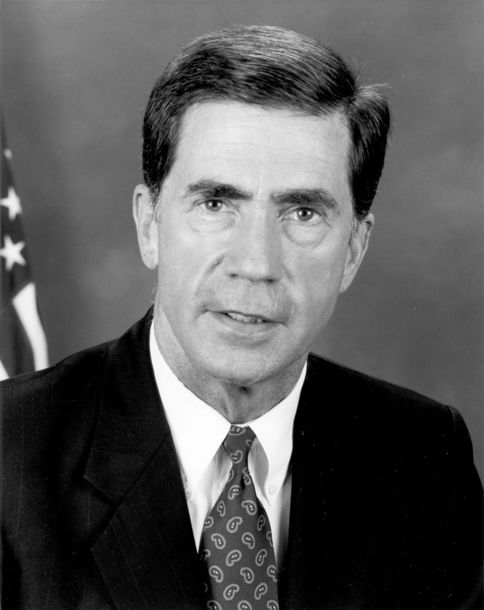

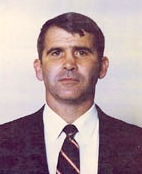

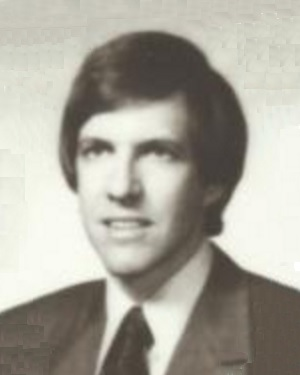
Nominee	Chuck Robb	Oliver North
Party	Democratic	Republican
Popular vote	938,376	882,213
Percentage	45.6%	42.9%
Nominee	J. Marshall Coleman
Party	Independent
Popular vote	235,324
Percentage	11.4%
- County and independent city results Robb: 40-50% 50–60% 60–70% 70–80% North: 40–50% 50–60% 60–70%
U.S. senator before election
Chuck Robb
Democratic
Elected U.S. senator
Chuck Robb
Democratic

Democrat Chuck Robb received over 70% of the vote when first elected in 1988, but struggled to win re-election. Furor over Robb's alleged affair with model Tai Collins provided plenty of momentum for the Republican Iran-Contra figure Oliver North. A factor to Robb's advantage was the independent candidacy of attorney J. Marshall Coleman. North likely lost votes to Coleman especially when Virginia's other senator, Republican John Warner, endorsed Coleman over North. Robb received 46% of the vote to North's 43% with Coleman garnering 11%.

Oliver North was a very controversial figure as he was involved in the Iran-Contra Affair, a scandal during Ronald Reagan's presidency. Marshall Coleman attempted to seize the middle ground between Robb and North. Republican senator John Warner of Virginia endorsed Marshall Coleman. On the eve of the election, former first lady Nancy Reagan told a reporter that North had lied to her husband when discussing Iran-Contra with the former president, effectively eviscerating him. North's candidacy was documented in the 1996 film A Perfect Candidate.

In his failed bid to unseat Robb, North raised $20.3 million in a single year through nationwide direct mail solicitations, telemarketing, fundraising events, and contributions from major donors. About $16 million of that amount was from direct mail alone. This was the biggest accumulation of direct mail funds for a statewide campaign to that date, and it made North the top direct mail political fundraiser in the country in 1994.

Douglas Wilder, the first black Governor of Virginia, who served from 1990 to 1994, originally entered the Senate race as an independent before dropping out.

1994 United States Senate election in Virginia
Party	Candidate	Votes	%	±%
Democratic	Chuck Robb (Incumbent)	938,376	45.61%	−25.64%
Republican	Oliver North	882,213	42.88%	+14.18%
Independent	J. Marshall Coleman	235,324	11.44%	
Independent	L. Douglas Wilder	113	0.01%	
Write-ins		1,437	0.07%	+0.01%
Majority		56,163	2.73%	−39.83%
Turnout		2,057,463		
Democratic hold		Swing		

== Washington ==
Washington election
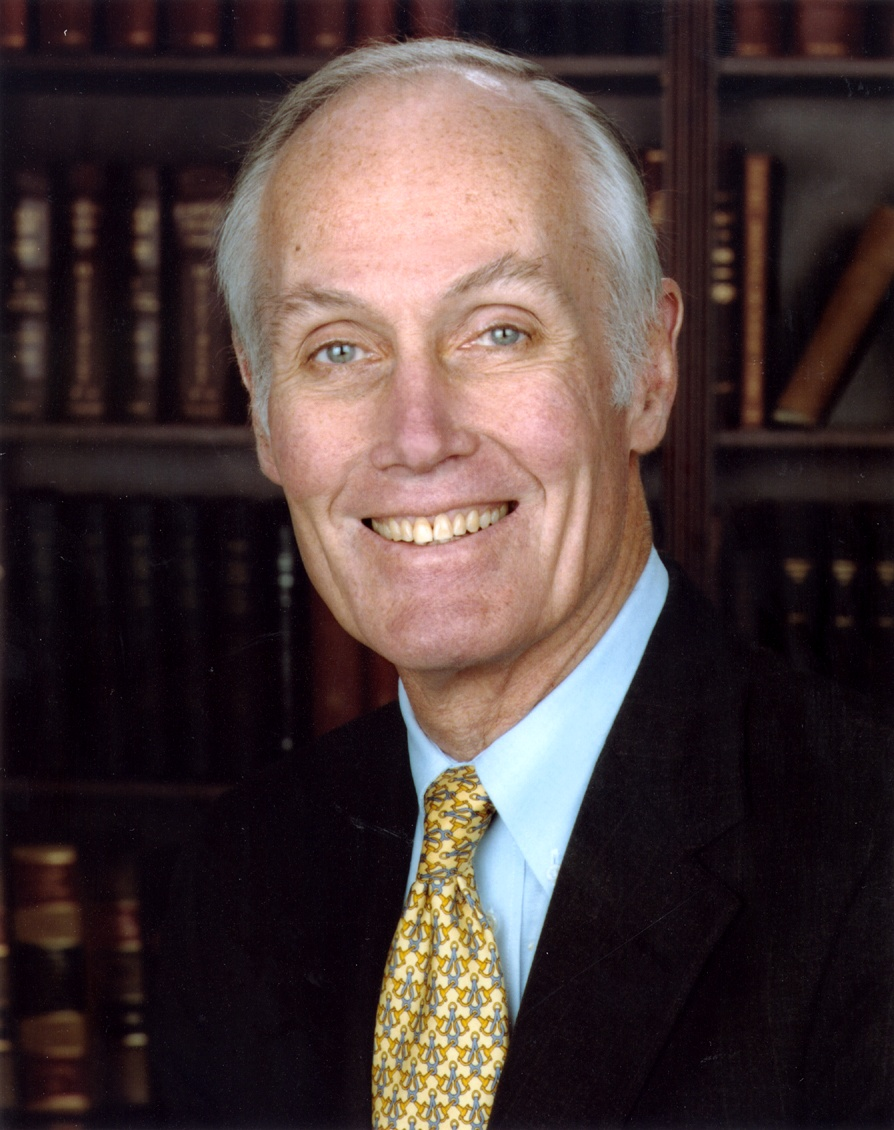

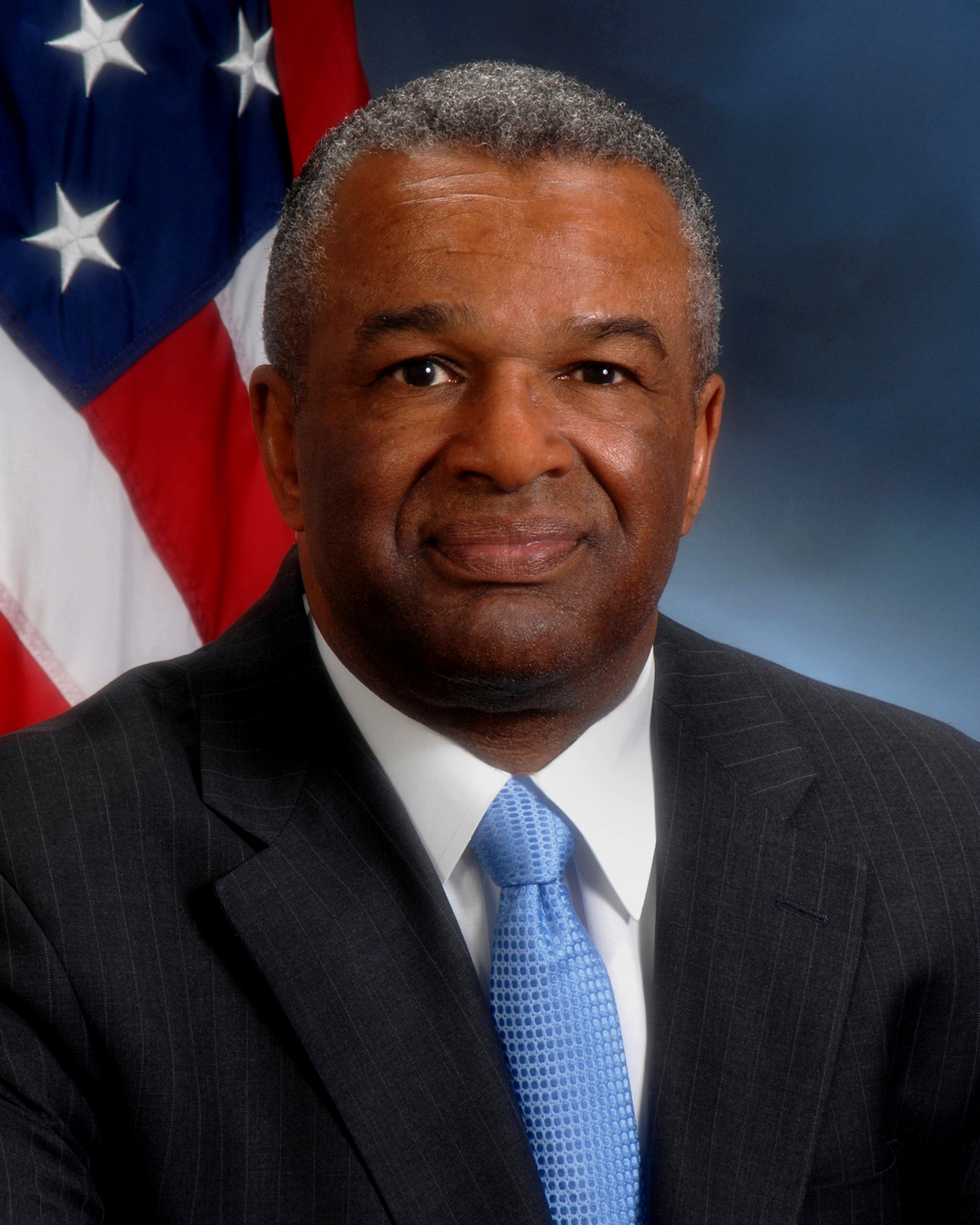
Nominee	Slade Gorton	Ron Sims
Party	Republican	Democratic
Popular vote	947,821	752,352
Percentage	55.8%	44.3%
- County results Gorton: 50-60% 60-70% 70-80% Sims: 50–60%
U.S. senator before election
Slade Gorton
Republican
Elected U.S. senator
Slade Gorton
Republican

Republican incumbent Slade Gorton, seeking his third non-consecutive term, defeated his Democratic opponent, King County Councilman Ron Sims.

General election
Party	Candidate	Votes	%	±%
Republican	Slade Gorton (Incumbent)	947,821	55.8%	+4.71%
Democratic	Ron Sims	752,352	44.3%	−4.61%
Majority		195,469	11.5%	+155,293%
Turnout		1,700,173		−148,369%
Republican hold		Swing		

== West Virginia ==
West Virginia election
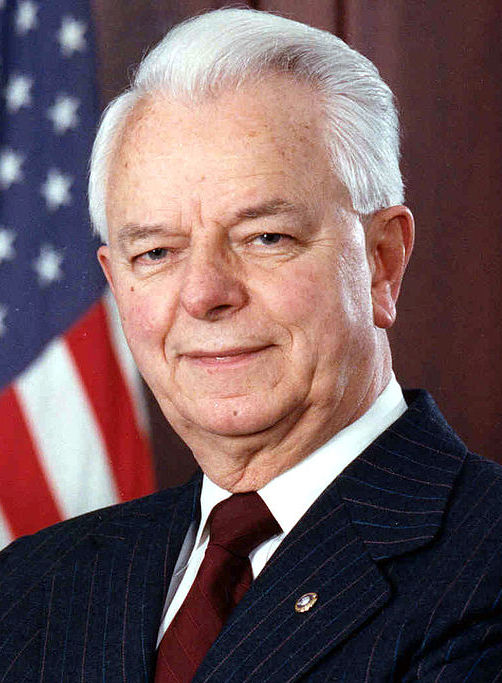

Nominee	Robert Byrd	Stanley Klos
Party	Democratic	Republican
Popular vote	290,495	130,441
Percentage	69.0%	31.0%
- County results Byrd: 50–60% 60–70% 70–80% 80–90%
U.S. senator before election
Robert Byrd
Democratic
Elected U.S. senator
Robert Byrd
Democratic

Democratic incumbent Robert Byrd, first elected in 1958, easily defeated his Republican opponent State Committee Finance Chairman Stanley L. Klos.

Klos campaigned as a "sacrificial lamb" against Robert C. Byrd participating in the Republican U.S. Senatorial Committee's strategy to re-capture a majority in the United States Senate in 1994. Byrd spent $1,550,354 to Klos' $267,165. Additionally the Democratic Party invested over $1 million in that state's campaign to the Republican Party's $15,000. The GOP captured a majority in the U.S. Senate. The highlights of the campaign included the hiring of an actor to play Robert C. Byrd who toured in staged Statewide Debates when the incumbent refused Klos's invitation for a series of formal senate debates. The campaign also organized successful demonstrations against the Bill and Hillary Clinton National Health Care Bus as it traveled through West Virginia in the summer of 1994. Senator Byrd, while the bill was being debated on the Senate floor rose suggesting the brakes be put on approving National Health Care measure while the bus was completing its tour in WV. To Klos's credit, the campaign did not implement the "Death by a Thousand Cuts" plan proposed by strategists which was later acknowledged in speeches given and letters written by U.S. senator Byrd.

General election
Party	Candidate	Votes	%
Democratic	Robert Byrd (Incumbent)	290,495	69.0%
Republican	Stan Klos	130,441	31.0%
Majority		160,054	38.0%
Total votes		420,936	100.00%
Democratic hold			

== Wisconsin ==
Wisconsin election
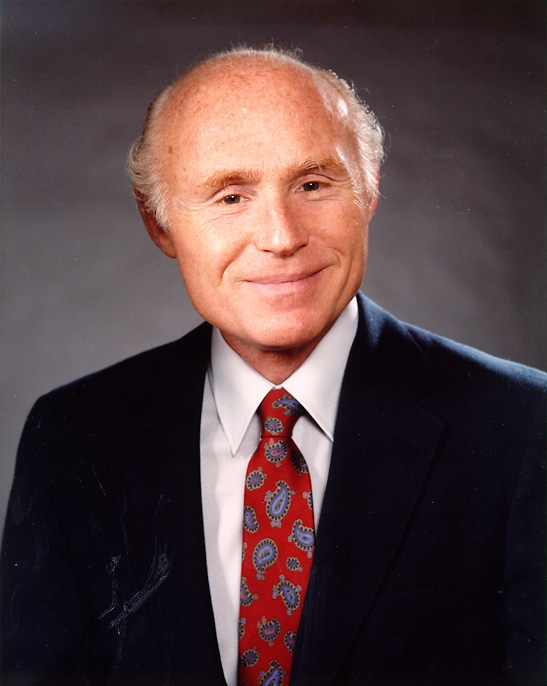

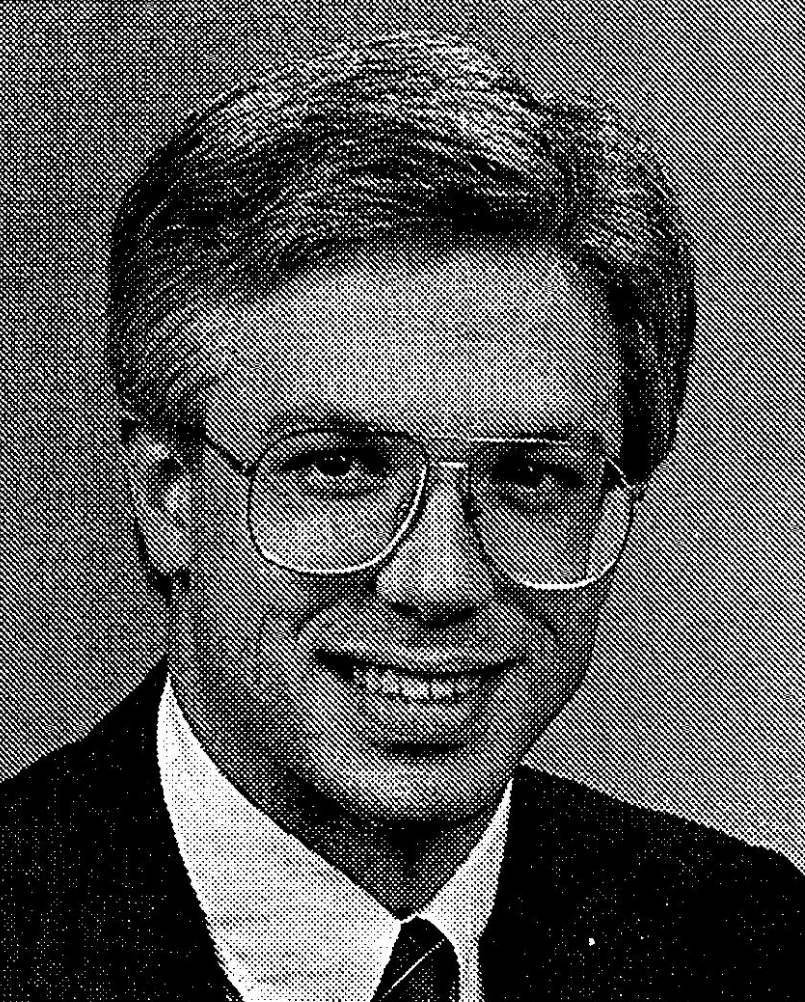
Nominee	Herb Kohl	Bob Welch
Party	Democratic	Republican
Popular vote	912,662	636,989
Percentage	58.3%	40.7%
- Kohl: 40–50% 50–60% 60–70% 70–80% Welch: 50–60% 60–70%
U.S. senator before election
Herb Kohl
Democratic
Elected U.S. senator
Herb Kohl
Democratic

Democratic incumbent Herb Kohl had little trouble winning a second term over former Republican state assemblyman Robert Welch.

General election
Party	Candidate	Votes	%
Democratic	Herb Kohl (Incumbent)	912,662	58.3%
Republican	Robert T. Welch	636,989	40.7%
Libertarian	James R. Dean	15,439	1.0%
Majority		275,673	17.6%
Total votes		1,565,090	100.00%
Democratic hold			

== Wyoming ==
Wyoming election
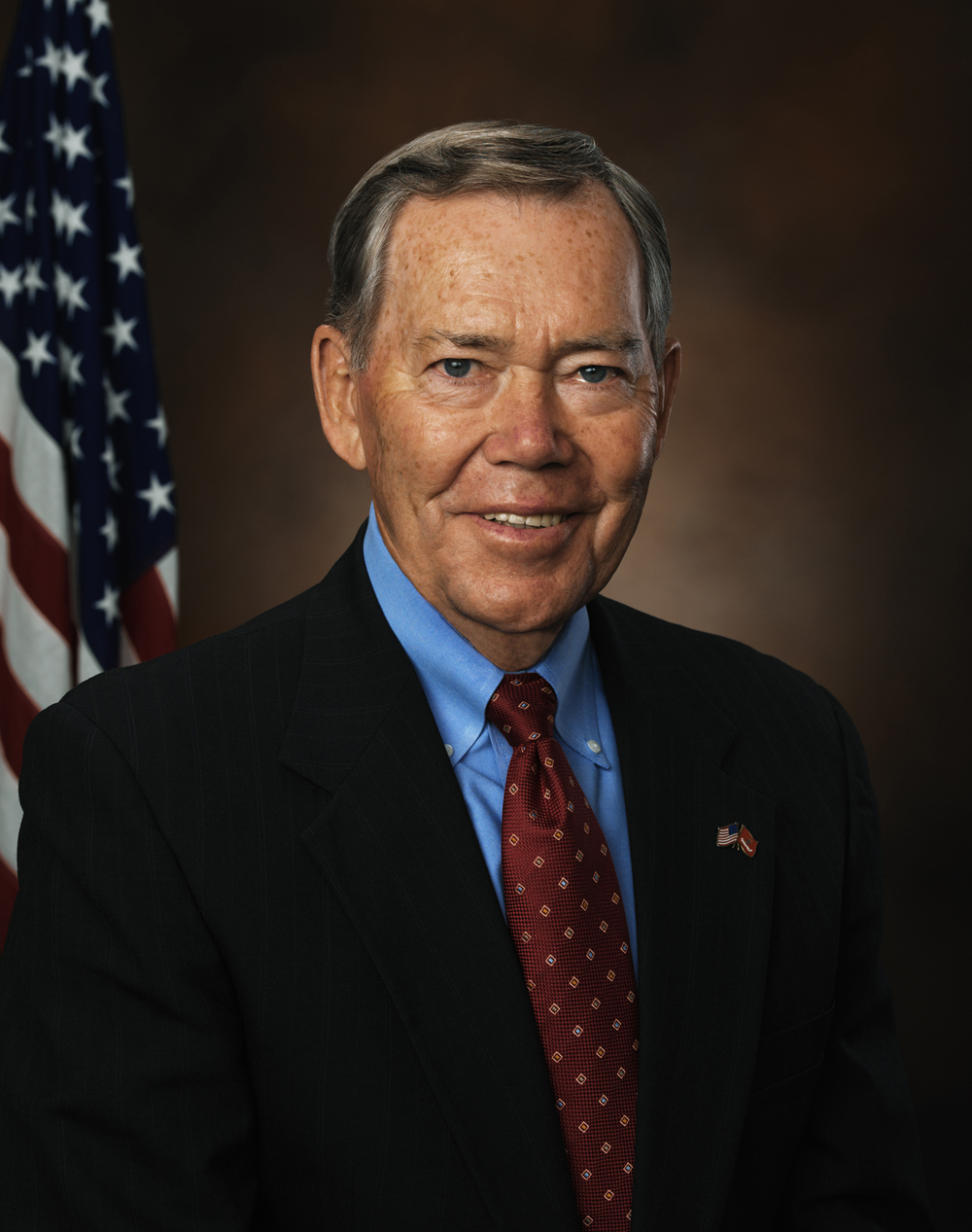

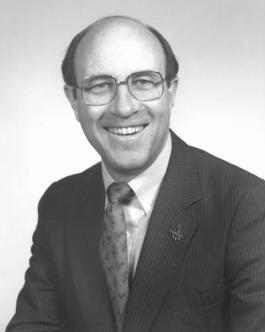
Nominee	Craig L. Thomas	Mike Sullivan
Party	Republican	Democratic
Popular vote	118,754	79,287
Percentage	58.87%	39.31%
- County results Thomas: 50–60% 60–70% 70–80% Sullivan: 40–50%
U.S. senator before election
Malcolm Wallop
Republican
Elected U.S. senator
Craig L. Thomas
Republican

Republican incumbent Malcolm Wallop retired after three terms. Republican Rep. Craig Thomas trounced Mike Sullivan, the state's two-term Democratic governor by twenty points.

General election
Party	Candidate	Votes	%
Republican	Craig L. Thomas	118,754	58.87%
Democratic	Mike Sullivan	79,287	39.31%
Libertarian	Craig Alan McClune	3,669	1.82%
Majority		39,467	19.57%
Turnout		201,710	
Republican hold			

== See also ==
- 1994 United States elections
  - 1994 United States gubernatorial elections
  - 1994 United States House of Representatives elections
- 103rd United States Congress
- 104th United States Congress
