= 1997 New Mexico's 3rd congressional district special election =

- May 13, 1997

New Mexico's 3rd congressional district
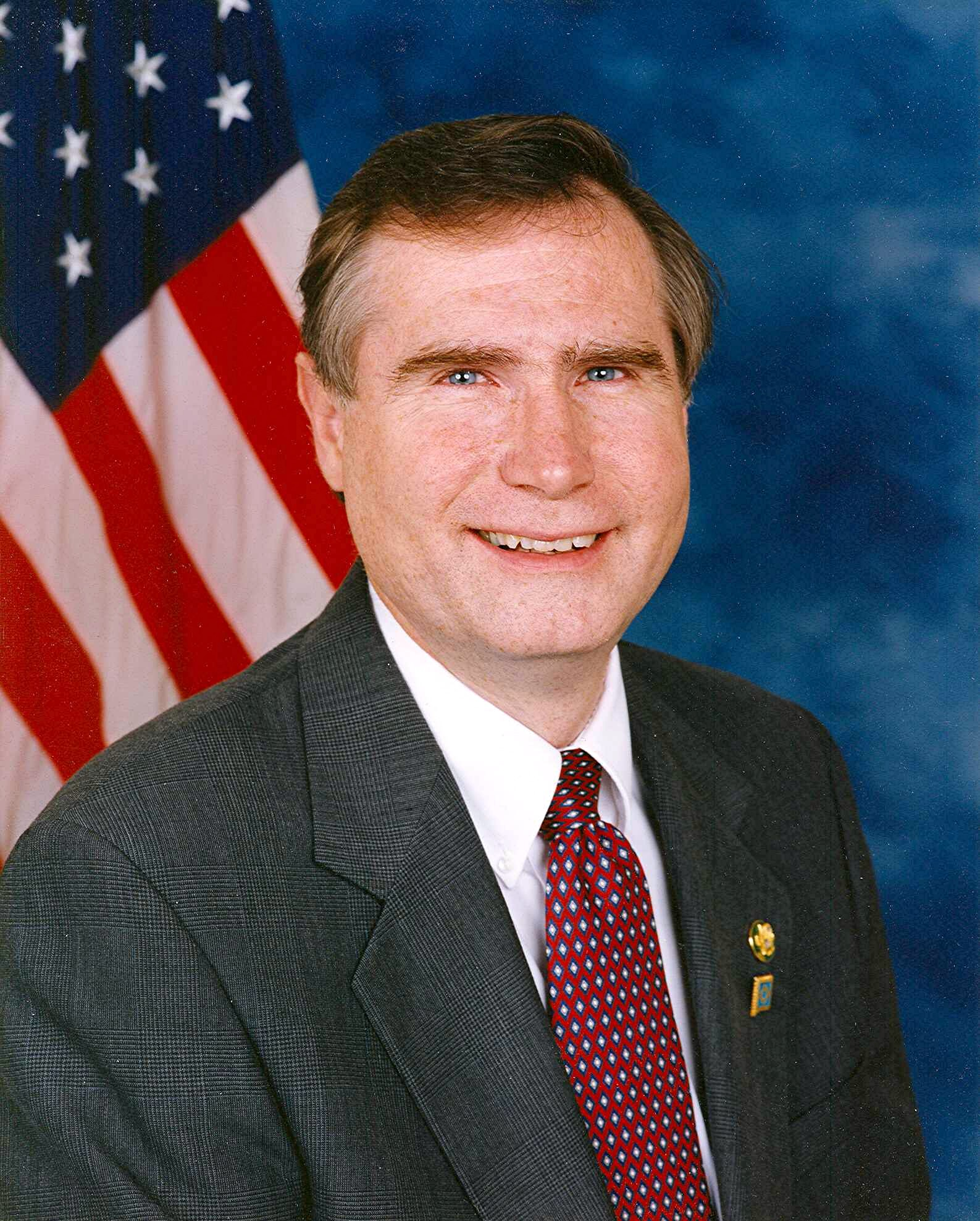

Nominee	Bill Redmond	Eric Serna	Carol Miller
Party	Republican	Democratic	Green
Popular vote	43,559	40,542	17,101
Percentage	42.75%	39.79%	16.78%
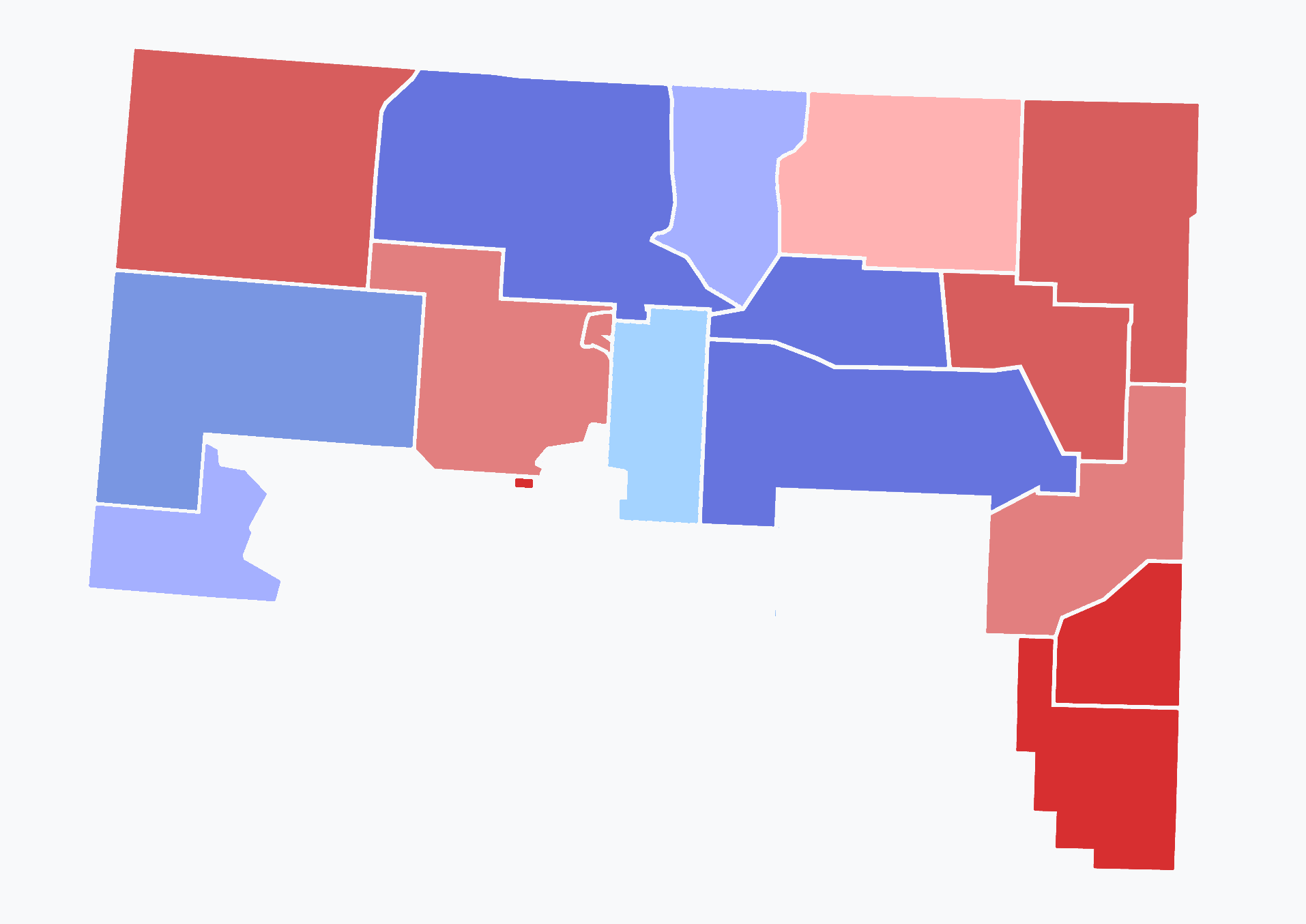
- County results Redmond: 40–50% 50–60% 60–70% 70–80% Serna: 30–40% 40–50% 50–60% 60–70%
U.S. Representative before election
Bill Richardson
Democratic
Elected U.S. Representative
Bill Redmond
Republican

A special election to determine the member of the United States House of Representatives for New Mexico's 3rd congressional district was held on May 13, 1997. Republican Bill Redmond defeated Democrat Eric Serna in a result which flipped this heavily Democratic seat to the Republican column. Redmond replaced Bill Richardson, who resigned from his seat in the House after he was appointed by Bill Clinton to be the United States Ambassador to the United Nations.

New Mexico's state law required the Governor of New Mexico to call for a special election within 10 days of a vacancy in the Congressional delegation to be held 84 to 91 days after the resignation. Governor Gary Johnson set the date of the special election as May 13. The election was held in the backdrop of the 1994 New Mexico gubernatorial election, where a Green Party candidate had taken over 10 percent of the vote and the party as a whole was continuing to grow in strength. All three parties (Democratic, Republican, and Green) held conventions to select their candidates for the special election, and the Democratic Central Committee's selection of Eric Serna proved to be especially controversial due to the "smoke-filled room" selection process it employed. Serna was repeatedly attacked during the campaign by Republicans for ethics complaints against him from his time at the State Corporation Commission, and the campaign was marred by negative campaigning from all sides.

Redmond's victory (by just 3,017 votes) was considered to be a huge upset in the strongly Democratic-leaning district. His win was attributed to the Green Party spoiler effect, the low turnout in the election, and the negative perception of Eric Serna. Redmond would be ousted in the 1998 midterms by future United States Senator Tom Udall, who won by a sizeable margin.

== Background ==
=== District and campaigns ===
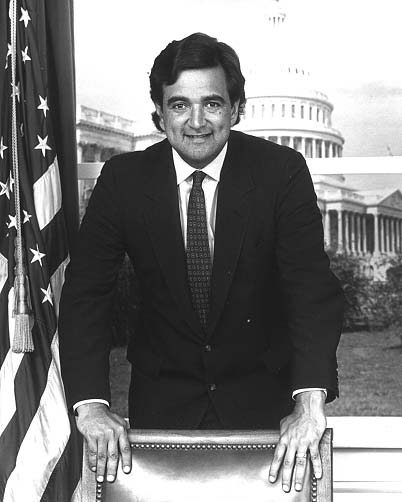
Congressman Bill Richardson held the 3rd congressional district for 8 terms and easily defended his seat in elections since the district's inception.

Democratic Congressman Bill Richardson had held New Mexico's 3rd congressional district since it was first created in redistricting after the 1980 census. After serving 8 terms, Richardson was appointed by President Bill Clinton to be the United States Ambassador to the United Nations. The heavily Democratic 3rd district held a large Democratic voter registration advantage, and was widely seen as a safe Democratic seat. The district breakdown was 59 percent Democratic, 29 percent Republican, 2 percent Green, and 9 percent Independent, giving Democrats a wide support base.

The Green Party of New Mexico had run a strong third party campaign in the 1994 New Mexico gubernatorial election, where former Lieutenant Governor Roberto Mondragón claimed 10 percent of the vote statewide, and was growing in strength in New Mexico at the time of the special election.

=== Nomination process ===
New Mexico's state law required the Governor of New Mexico to call for a special election within 10 days of a vacancy in the Congressional delegation. The law remarks that "... each qualified political party may nominate in the manner provided by the rules of that party." This meant that recognized parties in New Mexico, the Republican Party of New Mexico (GOP), Democratic Party of New Mexico, and the Green Party of New Mexico could nominate candidates through their own independent procedures. Independents were required to collect 4,786 valid petition signatures in order to appear on the ballot.

Pushback against the current nominating rules came from some Democrats in the New Mexico Senate, who worked to get a bill passed that would allow for a primary. Sponsors including Senators Gloria Howes, Dede Feldman, and Pauline Eisenstadt felt that a party primary would "open up" the process. The bill was initially delayed by the Senate Rules Committee because of technical issues with its language. Although it was able to pass this hurdle in committee, Governor Gary Johnson, a Republican, announced that he would veto the legislation, and the bill died before coming to a vote on the floor, leaving the party nomination process unchanged. Johnson cited the potential cost of the a primary ($214,000 to the state and $600,000 to the counties where the special election would be held) as his reason for supporting a veto. When the bill came up for a vote in the State Senate, its defeat was perceived as assured and Senator Ben Altamirano was even quoted as saying, "Is this the dead candidates bill?" The bill to change to a primary system for New Mexico was tabled in the Senate Finance Committee, meaning that even if it were to eventually pass, it would be too late for the May special election.

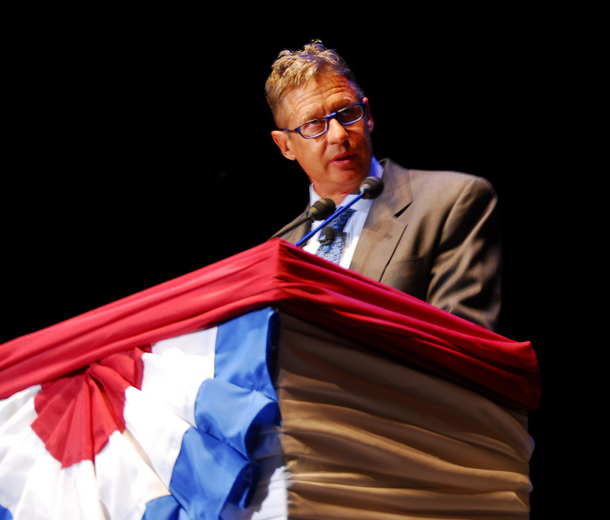
Governor Gary Johnson made a veto threat against a Democratic bill which would mandate primaries for special elections.

Richardson did not resign immediately, and waited until just before being confirmed as U.S. Ambassador to the United Nations to leave his Congressional seat. This delayed Johnson's ability to set a special election date, per state law. Richardson was confirmed to his new position on February 13, and resigned as a Congressman on the same day. Governor Gary Johnson set the date of the special election to May 13. Both the Republican and Democratic parties scheduled their nominating conventions for February 22. Earl Potter, chairman of the State Democratic Party, said "It's ours to lose" and noted the registration advantage Democrats had in the 3rd, while Earl Potter, New Mexico GOP chairman, noted that if the Green Party posted a candidate, it would siphon Democratic vote share. The Santa Fe New Mexican's Editorial Board heavily criticized both the Democrats and Republicans for a nominee selection process that it argued put power in the hands of so few people.

== Candidate selection process ==
=== Democratic Party nomination process ===
Because of the lack of a party primary for the special election, selecting a delegation was up to the Democratic Party of New Mexico's Central Committee. The group consisted of 89 members who would decide the nominee in a small convention together. Initially, there was confusion over the party's rules, where it could be interpreted that the 500 to 600 county central committee members could be the nominating body, but the Democratic Party's Judicial Committee ruled that the party's Central Committee members would nominate a candidate instead.

State Corporation Commissioner Eric Serna became an early favorite in the Democratic Central Committee, as he announced that he had enough support locked in from the 89 Democratic Central Committee members who chose the nominee. Serna met with Democratic leadership to earn their support in Washington, D.C. and to campaign among the delegation there. An early victory for Serna was seen in former Lieutenant Governor Roberto Mondragón's decision not to run for the seat on the Green Party's ticket, and he endorsed Serna. A number of Democrats who considered running for the seat chastised Serna and the Democratic Party for its "back room politics" approach to the nomination, while Serna announced the names of 56 of the 83 member central committee that publicly supported him.

Criticism of the nominating process came from most of the other candidates. A Democratic Party forum was held in Farmington, New Mexico. Gallup Mayor George Galanis vocally called for a primary at the forum but most other candidates focused on different issues instead. Galanis quickly dropped out from the primary, citing a need to focus instead on his own mayoral re-election effort. Galanis noted on dropping out that going through the central committee means "you are dealing with old politicos who are Neanderthals in politics." A group of liberal Democrats, called the "Concerned Democrats of Northern New Mexico", created a 21.5 page questionnaire and announced that they were uncomfortable with the speed at which the nomination was coming forward. Senator Roman Maes, one of the candidates for the Democratic nomination, criticized the process, stating, "Why do you need to raise money for 89 delegates when you don't have to put up any signs or buy any television or radio ads?" Santa Fe County Commissioner Javier Gonzales dropped out, while Dan Sosa Jr., a former New Mexico Supreme Court Justice, considered jumping into the race (he originally came to a forum to ask people about how to get his name on the ballot, but then joined the other candidates on stage). Maes announced that he was considering a general election write-in campaign due to disgust with the selection process, and then decided to drop out altogether instead.

Democratic leaders scheduled their committee meeting to choose a nominee on February 22, the same day as the Republican meeting. The Democrats held their meeting at the Sagebrush Inn in Taos, New Mexico. Sosa gave a speech to committee members before the vote, criticizing members for rushing to endorse Serna in January when other candidates were still considering runs.

==== Candidates ====
- Eric Serna, State Corporation Commissioner
- Ernie Lovato, former Governor of Santo Domingo Pueblo
- Dan Sosa Jr., former New Mexico Supreme Court justice
- Santa Fe Mayor Debbie Jaramillo
- State Senator Roman Maes (dropped out)
- Santa Fe County Commissioner Javier Gonzales (dropped out)
- Gallup Mayor George Galanis (dropped out before convention)
- Santa Fe lawyer Francesca Lobato

==== Results ====
Serna successfully won the Democratic nomination at the meeting, with 67 out of the 81 votes cast. 23 of the votes out of the total of 81 were cast by proxy, meaning that the central committee member did not attend in person. Justice Sosa Jr. received 8, Mayor Jaramillo received 2, former Governor Lovato received 2, and Lobato received 0. At 10AM, three hours before the meeting even started, a large sign announcing Serna as the Democratic nominee appeared outside the hotel the vote was taking place in. Upon receiving the nomination, Serna called for unity between Greens and Democrats at a press conference, reminding voters of the 1994 New Mexico gubernatorial election where the Green Party played spoiler to Democratic gubernatorial ambitions.

=== Republican Party nomination ===
The Republican Party decided to hold a convention with their central committee membership deciding the nominee. Bill Redmond, a pastor for the Santa Fe Christian Church, and State Senator Joe Carraro of Albuquerque both immediately announced their interest as candidates. Another GOP candidate, Rick Lopez, the chief administrative officer for the New Mexico State Engineer Office, in February announced that he was seeking the GOP nomination as well. Thomas Clayton, a Santa Fe lawyer, also sought the GOP nomination. The Republicans held their convention in Santa Fe, New Mexico.

==== Candidates ====
- Bill Redmond, pastor
- State Senator Joe Carraro
- Rick Lopez, chief administrative officer for the state Engineer Office
- Thomas Clayton, lawyer

==== Results ====
Bill Redmond received 70 of 134 votes cast in the GOP central committee meeting, and Redmond received the nomination. Redmond had previously been defeated by Richardson in 1996. Senator Carrarro received 33 votes to finish in second place. Governor Johnson briefly appeared at the Republican convention and called for everyone to rally around Redmond. In a speech after receiving the GOP nomination, Redmond called for it as being the time "to discard the liberal agenda."

=== Green Party nomination ===
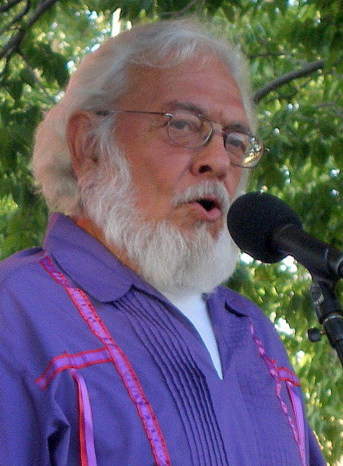
Mondragón, the Green Party nominee in the 1994 gubernatorial election, called unsuccessfully for the Greens to endorse Democrat Eric Serna. He would re-register as a Democrat before the election.

The Green Party was initially unsure of whether it would hold a convention, waiting to see if the Democratic-controlled legislature acted on their priorities, noting that if they did not, they would nominate a candidate in mid-March. Independent Patricia Wolff, the Green Party nominee for state land commissioner in 1994, announced her intention to run for the seat in the upcoming special in January, but then changed her mind. The Green Party decided in February to hold a convention—Santa Fe city councilman Cris Moore immediately expressed interest in the nomination. The Green Party announced plans to hold a convention on March 9 (later changed to March 16) at Northern New Mexico Community College, with Santa Fe City Councilor Cris Moore and Carol Miller of Rio Arriba County announcing runs for the nomination.

At the start of the nominating convention in March, Abraham Gutmann, who ran unsuccessfully as the Green Party candidate against Republican U.S. Senator Pete Domenici, and former Lieutenant Governor Roberto Mondragón, the former Green Party gubernatorial candidate in 1994, debated whether the party should put forward their own candidate (which Gutmann supported), or endorse the Democratic nominee, Serna (which Mondragón supported). Mondragón said, "There's a time to put together a platform of monumental ideas, and there is a time to run for office and lose," he said. Mondragón said Serna's position on "90 percent of the issues closely mirrors our own." Political commentator and author Roger Morris spoke at the convention and criticized Serna for alleged ethical issues during his 16 years on the Corporation Commission, which the Albuquerque Journal noted that "some delegates' sentiments seemed better expressed by Morris".

Some Greens criticized Serna at their convention, claiming that his nomination represented a rightward shift of the Democratic Party to support businesses. Santa Fe councilor Cris Moore said in a speech that Greens would have more support in the general because, "If a Green enters the race, we will have a very strong turnout, because a lot of people are very upset with how Eric Serna was selected."

Carol Miller was elected by the Greens at their convention: of the 63 total delegates, 55 supported Miller, despite Mondragón's urgings to endorse Serna.

=== Other nominees and independents ===
Daniel Pearlman initially announced his intention to run as an independent, but eventually accepted the Reform Party nomination instead. Pearlman stated that he "didn't follow Perot necessarily" but respected him for creating a third party. He received the nomination from the Reform Party because four party officials met and chose Pearlman—one other candidate was scheduled for an interview but didn't show up. The Libertarians selected Ed Nagel, a perennial candidate who had previously run against Richardson as the Libertarian candidate in 1992, 1994, and 1996.

== General election ==
=== Early fighting and campaigning ===
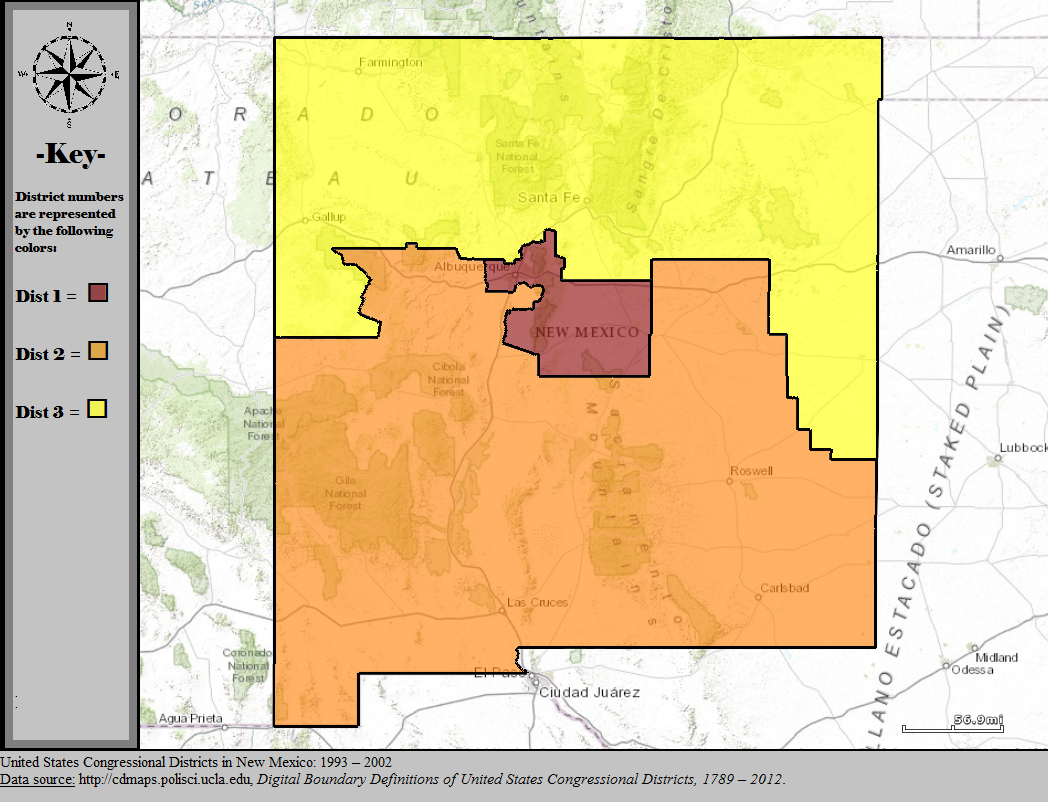
New Mexico's 3rd congressional district represented most of Northern New Mexico. The district as it was during the 1997 special election is seen on this map in yellow.

Before Serna had even secured the Democratic nomination, GOP Chairman John Dendahl attacked Serna on ethics-related grounds and for the Democratic nomination process, which was attracting controversy. The ethics complaint dealt with allegations that Serna had pressured Corporation Commission employees to buy from his family's jewelry store and that he accepted an illegal campaign car from businessmen. Carol Miller, the Green Party candidate, challenged candidates to limit their spending to $100,000 and called on television stations to hold televised debates, while U.S. House Minority Leader Dick Gephardt was slated to headline a fundraiser for Serna in Albuquerque. Serna rejected Miller's spending pledge, with a spokesman for his campaign saying, "This special election is so short and our district is so large, that would limit our ability to get out all the important information we have for the voters." Redmond announced that he would limit his spending to $100,000 if Serna would limit his spending to the same level, and if Serna (who was State Corporation commissioner) promised not to solicit campaign funds from industries regulated by the commission.

Personal attacks abounded as the campaign moved closer to the special election. Democratic Party chairman Earl Potter called Redmond a "Christian Coalition fundamentalist preacher" and said that Redmond "represents the values of Pat Robertson and Jerry Falwell not the values of Northern New Mexico." Redmond claimed that his pro-life position was in line with Catholic communities of Northern New Mexico and compared his stances to that of Pope John Paul II and Mother Teresa. Nancy Ellefson, the Executive Director of NARAL New Mexico, announced her endorsement of Serna at a press conference. When asked about Miller's support of abortion rights, Ellefson said that a vote for Miller would only give Redmond a better chance of winning. Miller said she was "shocked" by Ellefson's statement and said she was a longtime advocate for stripping restrictions on abortion. A member of the Santa Fe Democratic Committee endorsed Redmond because of his pro-life stance, and the Redmond campaign highlighted his endorsement and other endorsements of anti-abortion Democrats. Serna's support of abortion rights caused Archbishop Michael Sheehan of the Santa Fe Archdiocese call Serna personally and criticize his stance.

In mid-April, New Mexico Democrats ramped up attacks on Redmond, holding two press conferences within the span of a week. Democratic State Chairman Earl Potter criticized Redmond for attending GOPAC and for its links to Speaker Newt Gingrich. Redmond criticized Democratic radio ads and said that "Newt Gingrich is not my hero." Redmond held a press conference, calling on Democrats to cease their negative attacks, and said that Democrats were desperate because the race was tightening.

=== Forums and more attacks ===
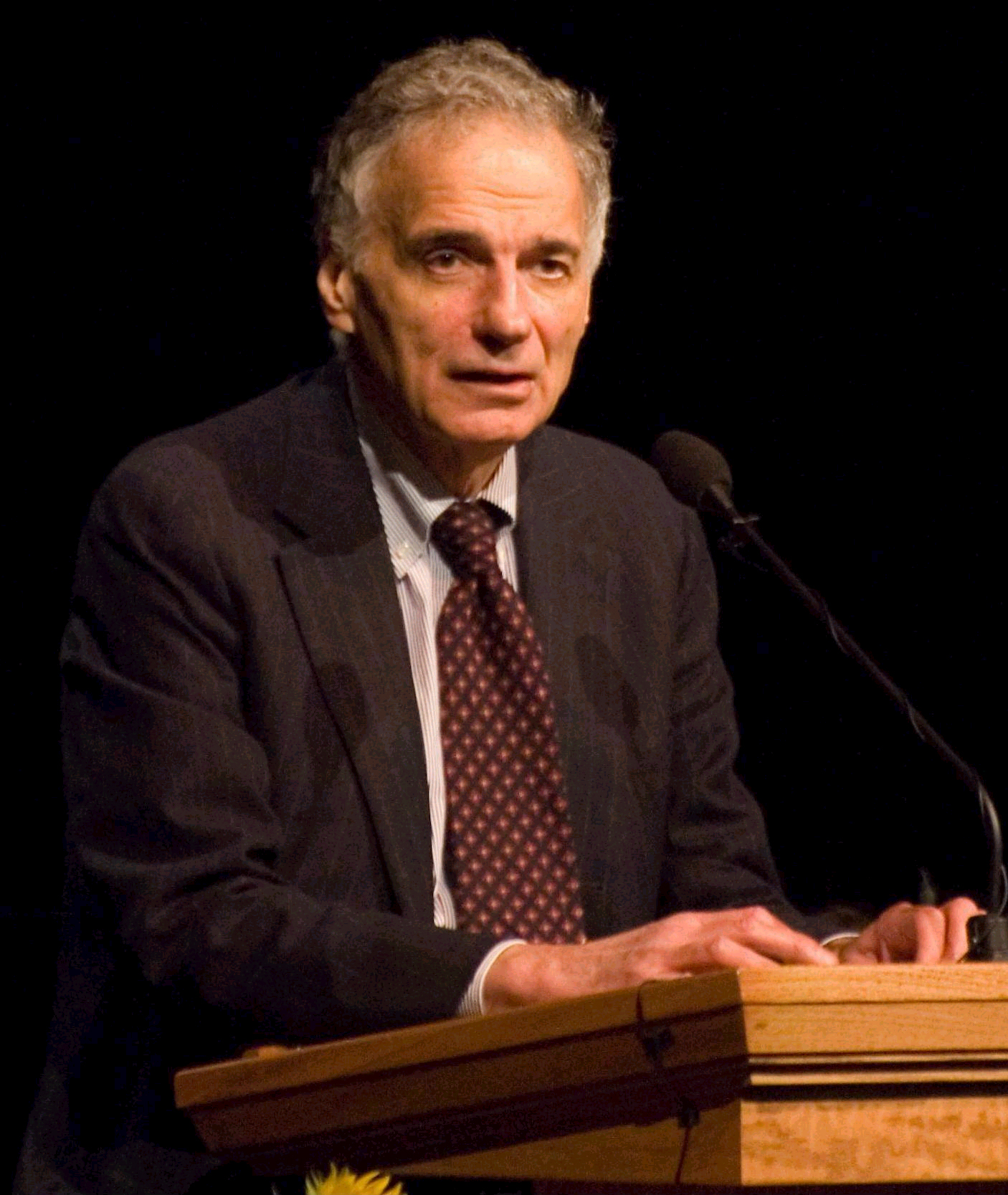
Former Green Party Presidential nominee Ralph Nader toured the district in support of Green Party nominee Carol Miller.

At a forum in Taos that was aired on cable television, Miller, Serna, Redmond, and Pearlman participated, along with write-in candidate Michael Guss. There were 60 people present in the audience. Serna cast himself as supporting businesses that are environmentally sound, and announced support for decent pay for teachers. Miller cast herself as the "hopeful" candidate and announced support for health care for everyone when they needed it. Pearlman announced that the only issue of his Reform Party was the Constitution and allowing people to speak directly to politicians, while Redmond felt that social ills were created by federal taxation from the federal government. The Santa Fe New Mexican's Andrew Stiny called the questions from the moderators "sometimes convoluted", a sentiment which most of the candidates had expressed during the forum.

Attacks between Serna and Redmond continued through April. The Republicans alleged that Serna missed a candidates' forum that he should have attended, releasing a press release saying that a source told the GOP that they had seen Serna eating at a sushi bar and drinking beer, instead of attending a candidates' forum in Paradise Hills, New Mexico. Serna angrily responded that "I don't even like sushi and I wouldn't be drinking a beer in a bar like that. I like American beer, Corona, really," he said, and noted that he was at Democratic county conventions. Radio attack ads included Republican ads against Serna, saying: "Washington is engulfed in money scandals and corruption. Eric Serna would fit right in" and an ad that said, "a corrupt politician with a record of demanding money and favors from the people and companies he regulates." Democratic hits against Redmond included: a radio ad hitting Redmond for being a "radical right-wing preacher who wants to impose his extreme values and social agenda on all of us" and a news release criticizing Redmond for holding a fundraiser with former Vice President Dan Quayle.

Miller criticized Serna for ignoring her campaign, and for buying cardboard signs which were blowing in the wind and creating garbage. The Rio Grande chapter of the Sierra Club endorsed Serna instead of Miller, saying that Serna's environmental policies were the same or better than Miller's, and accused Miller of being a vote splitter to help elect Redmond. Serna also received the endorsement of the Conservation Vote Alliance, a 5,000 member group.

Taxes and personal disclosures became a major issue as well. Serna and Miller both released their full tax returns, but Redmond refused to release his. Serna's campaign manager claimed that Redmond was "the only candidate I've ever heard of who's considered disclosure of information to the public to be a trap that he needs to avoid." At a League of Women Voters forum, all four candidates (Pearlman, Serna, Redmond, and Miller all participated while Attila Csanyi, past state Libertarian Party chair, spoke on behalf of their candidate) supported balancing the federal budget within five years, but only Redmond supported a Constitutional Amendment to codify it. Redmond attacked Serna for criticizing him for refusing to disclose his finances, calling it a "smokescreen" and saying he had followed Federal regulations. Serna said that "we should have nothing to hide from the people we hope to represent". Pearlman got laughs at the forum for admitting that he wasn't taking any fundraising money and that he threw away the FEC (Federal Election Commission) disclosure in the trash because he was going to raise and spend less than $5,000.

The National Federation of Independent Business (NFIB) endorsed Redmond, and criticized Serna for his support from unions. They rolled out two ads attacking Serna, which said that Serna was getting "thousands from union bosses" to support his candidacy. In Roll Call, the National Republican Congressional Committee (NRCC) admitted that it "wasn't doing much" for Redmond. To support Miller, Ralph Nader planned a 20-hour whirlwind tour of the 3rd district. Nader, at one of the campaign appearances, called both Serna and Redmond, "two of the most undistinguished candidates that you and I have ever seen."

=== Home stretch ===
On May 1, fundraising reports came out, and Serna raised the most money of any candidate by over $300,000. Experts in the runup to the election considered the race to be much closer than anyone expected between Serna and Miller. GOP leaders began to contend that Redmond could be in place for an upset victory, while a New Mexico political scientist said, "I become less confident every day" about a Serna victory. A poll a week out from the election from the Santa Fe New Mexican found Serna with an 8-point lead over Redmond, but with 15 percent of the electorate undecided. Specifically, the poll found that Serna was at 39 percent, Redmond at 31 percent, Miller at 12 percent, and 15 percent were undecided. F. Chris Garcia, a political scientist at the University of New Mexico, noted that if turnout was low and voters considered the corruption allegations against Serna heavily, there would be a chance for an upset in the heavily Democratic 3rd district.

Miller publicly accused Serna of running an "unfair campaign" and planned to file a complaint with New Mexico's Secretary of State about Serna's "election irregularities". Serna's campaign said that it was Miller's "last gasp" because she was desperately behind Serna in the polls. In the run-up to the election, an analysis of the campaigns' websites found that Serna had the highest quality and most polished site, that Miller's page had dedicated information on the Green platform, but that Redmond hosted his website on a free GeoCities page which was criticized for containing little material. Redmond promised that if he were elected to Congress, he would buy a modem for himself.

Negative campaigning continued to be widespread from all sides. Due to the acrimonious nature of the election, Redmond and Miller announced their intentions to send observers to make sure election laws were being followed at polling places, while supporters of Serna announced that they were requesting the U.S. Department of Justice to monitor Republican observers. A spokesperson for Miller's campaign said they were sending observers to anywhere ballots were being counted by hand, citing "real concerns about voter fraud." Serna received late endorsements from President Bill Clinton, Vice President Al Gore, and New Mexico Senator Jeff Bingaman. The GOP attacked Serna, calling him the "poster child for corrupt politicians." Bingaman released a statement, saying that Redmond was "one of the very few 3rd District residents who 'strongly opposes' what Bill Richardson stands for." The Republican Chairman Dendahl filed an FEC complaint against the state Democratic Party over $40,000 they had spent. Dendahl also complained that a PAC-affiliated commercial that was airing later in the week was against FEC guidelines. Both Republicans and Democrats blanketed mailboxes with applications to request an absentee ballot to try and drive up turnout from their voters, while Serna was the subject of a negative mailer from New Mexico Republicans, which had black and white headlines from newspapers about Serna's alleged conflicts of interest and stories about the national Democratic Party's campaign contribution scandals. Democrats lodged an FEC complaint regarding Redmond's missing identification requirements that they alleged he failed to file.

The state's two largest newspapers, The Albuquerque Tribune and the Albuquerque Journal, both endorsed Green Party candidate Carol Miller instead of Serna in a surprise. Miller was widely considered to have run the most visible Green Party campaign since the governor's race in 1994. A Corporation Commission employee (where Serna worked) was seen taking flyers off of cars supporting Redmond in the parking lot near their office, adding to allegations of Serna misusing his government office staff.

A last debate, hosted by KNME-TV, took place a day before the primary. During the debate, Redmond stated that he never wanted to get rid of the United States Department of Education, which ran counter to speeches he repeatedly gave on the campaign trail. All of the candidates agreed that the Los Alamos National Laboratory (located in the district) should stop work on developing nuclear weapons. Serna fought back hard against the allegations he faced, while Redmond said that while the allegations may not be illegal, they were unethical. On Election Day itself, polling clerks reported generally light crowds of voters in the morning. Early and absentee voting was "generally good". The clerk for Santa Fe County noted that some voters who had requested absentee ballots were still arriving at polling places, causing some confusion.

=== Results ===
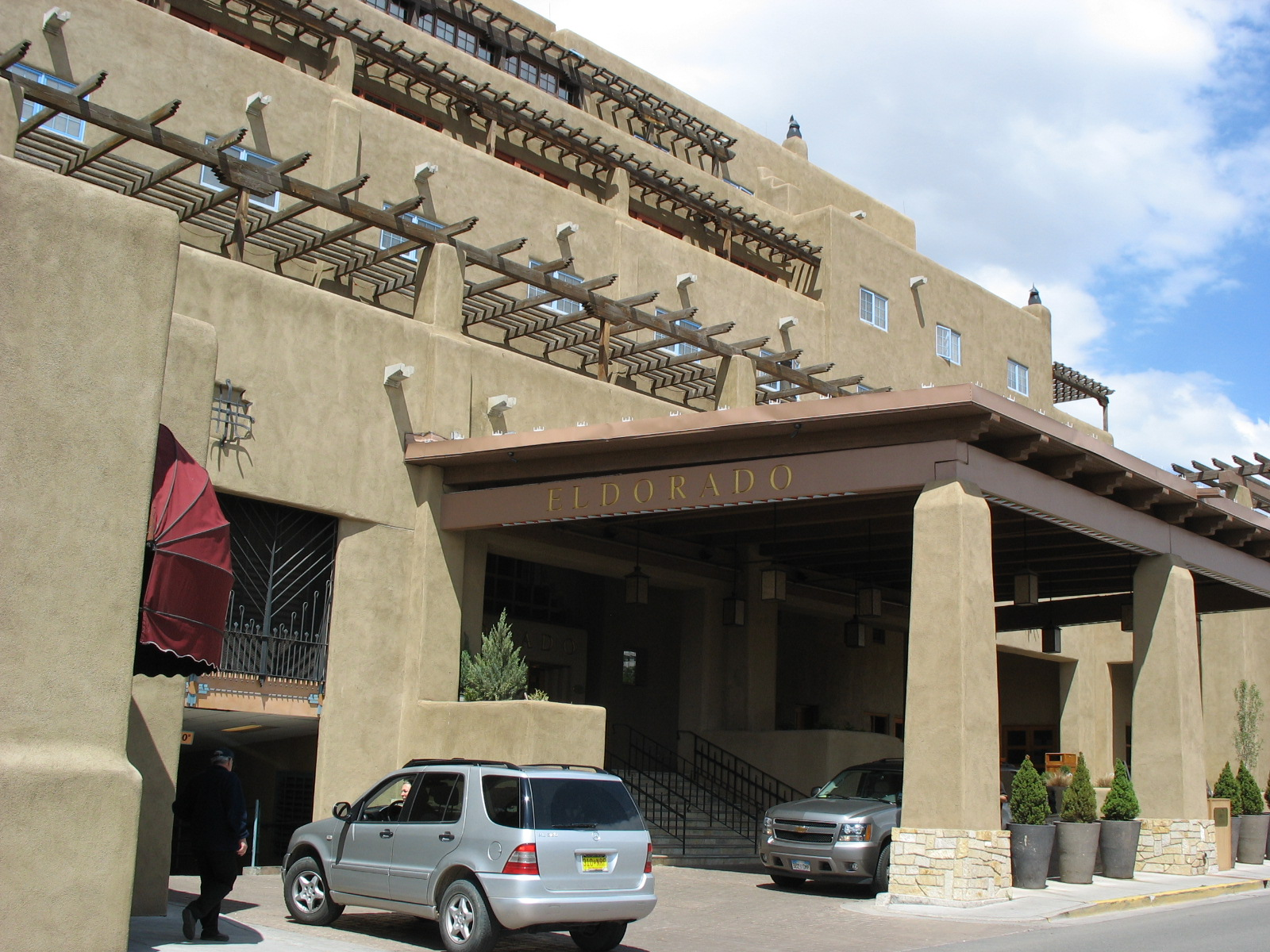
On Election Night, Serna and the Democrats gathered at the Eldorado Hotel in Santa Fe, where Serna refused to immediately concede.

In an upset, Redmond won by a margin of 3,017 votes. On Election Night, Redmond said, "This was a race that people said was unwinnable. We did it today." Redmond's election night watch party was at an "out of the way" Holiday Inn, while a stunned Serna was at the Eldorado Hotel, a "swanky" location according to The Albuquerque Tribune. Serna initially refused to concede on election night, saying the numbers could still change enough for him to win, but he conceded the following morning.

For the first time since its creation in 1982, New Mexico's 3rd district was controlled by Republicans. All of New Mexico's U.S. House seats were also controlled by Republicans. Political scientists who studied New Mexico politics were stunned by the victory of Redmond, while The Santa Fe New Mexican called the results, "one of the biggest upsets in New Mexico political history." Serna had outspent Redmond by over two to one, and Redmond had just lost less than a year previously to Richardson by 67% to 30%. Redmond proclaimed, "They called it mission impossible, I call it mission accomplished."

Political scientist F. Chris Garcia of the University of New Mexico felt that Democrats were "just caught by surprise" at the result and the strength of Redmond, considering Redmond's previous loss. Attorney General Tom Udall said "this is a very sad day for the Democratic Party." Ray Sena, the new Democratic Party chairman who was elected two weeks before the special, blamed the loss on the race's negative tone, low turnout, and vote-splitting because of the Green Party. The Albuquerque Tribune noted that Richardson was prohibited from campaigning in the district due to his new role as a Diplomat, stopping the popular incumbent from stumping for Serna. Thomas Mann from the Brookings Institution contended that Carol Miller and the Green Party vote share were entirely responsible for Serna's loss, while Gilbert St. Clair, a University of New Mexico political scientist, attributed that low voter turnout (35 percent) was the reason for the stunning defeat. Republican U.S. Senator Pete Domenici attributed Serna's loss for going negative too early. Colorado Governor Roy Romer, who became the head of the DNC (Democratic National Committee), noted a month after the election that "people are talking about how they cost us that seat in New Mexico. I'll tell you something: they got a lot of Democrats angry." Dr. David Magleby found in his book that Redmond won for three reasons: a weak Democratic candidate in Eric Serna (who was thought to have manipulated the nomination procedures for his gain), low voter turnout, and the spoiler effect of Carol Miller. Democratic activists after this election began to clamor for Democratic-Green fusion tickets to be allowed to avoid splitting the vote like this in the future.

Redmond would be defeated in his bid for re-election in 1998 by future United States Senator Tom Udall, who won by 10%.

1997 New Mexico's 3rd congressional district special election
Party	Candidate	Votes	%
Republican	Bill Redmond	43,559	42.75%
Democratic	Eric P. Serna	40,542	39.79%
Green	Carol Miller	17,101	16.78%
Libertarian	Ed Nagel	393	0.39%
Reform	Daniel Pearlman	304	0.30%
Total votes		101,899	100%
Republican gain from Democratic			

==== By county ====
County	Teresa Leger Fernandez Democratic		Sharon Clahchischilliage Republican		Carol Miller Green		All others		Margin		Total votes cast
County	#	%	#	%	#	%	#	%	#	%	Total votes cast
Bernalillo (part)	1,206	71.6%	296	17.6%	173	10.3%	10	0.6%	910	54.0%	1,685
Cibola (part)	150	38.1%	195	49.5%	39	9.9%	10	2.5%	-45	-11.4%	394
Colfax	1,360	46.8%	1,203	41.4%	325	11.2%	15	0.5%	157	5.4%	2,903
Curry	3,840	72.8%	1,249	23.7%	167	3.2%	21	0.4%	2,591	49.1%	5,277
Harding	218	64.5%	114	33.7%	6	1.8%	0	0.0%	104	30.8%	338
Los Alamos	3,433	53.4%	1,696	26.4%	1,210	18.8%	93	1.4%	1,737	27.0%	6,432
McKinley	2,779	32.4%	4,953	57.8%	769	9.0%	71	0.8%	-2,174	-25.4%	8,572
Mora	321	23.8%	944	70.0%	80	5.9%	4	0.2%	-623	-46.2%	1,349
Quay	1,298	59.1%	816	37.1%	75	3.4%	8	0.3%	482	22.0%	2,197
Rio Arriba	1,650	22.3%	4,897	66.1%	841	11.4%	21	0.3%	-3,247	-43.8%	7,409
Roosevelt	1,756	71.2%	584	23.7%	119	4.8%	8	0.4%	1,172	47.5%	2,467
San Juan	10,858	66.2%	4,511	27.5%	919	5.6%	122	0.7%	6,347	38.7%	16,410
San Miguel	1,034	21.0%	3,193	64.8%	678	13.8%	22	0.5%	-2,159	-43.8%	4,927
Sandoval (part)	5,401	53.1%	3,095	30.4%	1,588	15.6%	96	1.0%	2,306	22.7%	10,180
Santa Fe (part)	6,623	25.9%	10,073	39.4%	8,697	34.0%	165	0.6%	-1,376	-5.4%	25,558
Taos	1,114	22.1%	2,463	48.9%	1,394	27.7%	68	1.4%	-1,069	21.2%	5,039
Union	518	64.3%	260	32.3%	21	2.6%	6	0.8%	258	32.0%	805
Totals	43,559	42.7%	40,542	39.8%	17,101	16.8%	393	0.4%	3,017	2.9%	101,942
