= 1976 United States Senate election in New Mexico =

- November 2, 1976
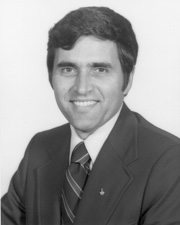

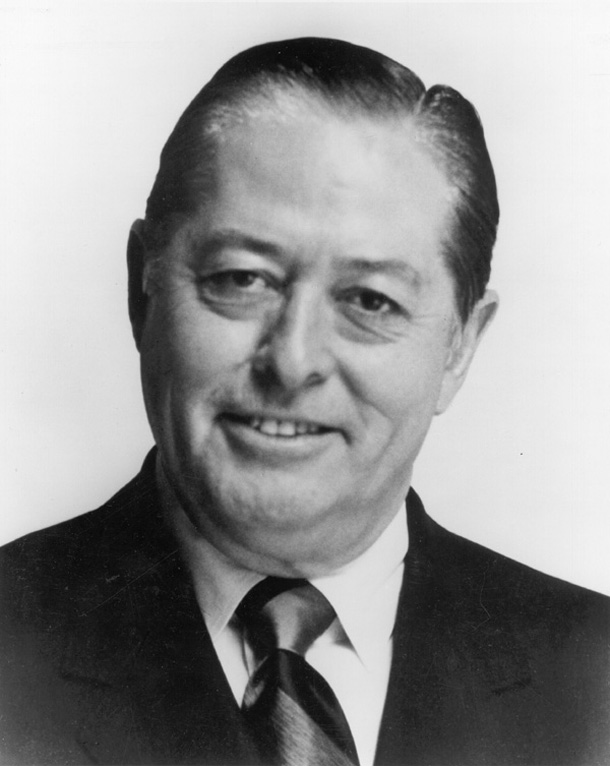
Nominee	Harrison Schmitt	Joseph Montoya
Party	Republican	Democratic
Popular vote	234,681	176,382
Percentage	56.82%	42.70%
- County results Schmitt: 50–60% 60–70% Montoya: 50–60% 60–70%
U.S. senator before election
Joseph Montoya
Democratic
Elected U.S. Senator
Harrison Schmitt
Republican

The 1976 United States Senate election in New Mexico took place on November 2, 1976. Incumbent Democratic U.S. Senator Joseph Montoya ran for re-election to a third term, but was defeated by Republican Harrison Schmitt. As of 2026, this is the last time that the Republicans have won the Class 1 Senate seat in New Mexico.

Harrison Schmitt's inauguration marked the first time since 1917 when both Senate seats were held by Republicans. Schmitt was the first non-Hispanic to have won this seat since Bronson Murray Cutting in 1934. This is also the last time a Democratic senator from New Mexico lost re-election.

Schmitt won the election in a decisive victory. Montoya congratulated Schmitt on his victory, saying, "The people have spoken and I accept their verdict."

== Republican primary ==
=== Candidates ===
- Eugene W. Peirce Jr., businessman and former state legislator
- Harrison Schmitt, former astronaut

==== Eliminated at convention ====
- Arthur Lavine

=== Campaign ===
In the pre-primary convention held on March 27, 1976, Schmitt received 73.7% of the votes and businessman Peirce received 21%, allowing both to qualify for the primary ballot. Lavine received 5.3% of the votes, not enough to be placed on the primary ballot.

=== Results ===
In the June 1 primary election, Schmitt defeated Peirce and became the Republican nominee.

== General election ==
=== Candidates ===
- Joseph Montoya, incumbent U.S. Senator (Democratic)
- Harrison Schmitt, former astronaut (Republican)

=== Campaign ===
Schmitt campaigned for 14 months, running a forward-looking campaign critical of Montoya's ethical issues. His slogan was "Honesty for a change." On the campaign trail, Schmitt, who was twenty years younger than Montoya, frequently said, "I have time for the future; Senator Montoya does not."

On the campaign trail in October, Montoya repeatedly ridiculed Schmitt's experience as an astronaut by comparing him to a little monkey ("changito"), who could be trained to travel in space.

=== Results ===
General election results
Party	Candidate	Votes	%	±%
Republican	Harrison Schmitt	234,681	56.82%	▲9.69
Democratic	Joseph Montoya (incumbent)	176,382	42.70%	▼10.17
La Raza Unida	Ernesto B. Borunda	1,087	0.26%	N/A
American Independent	Matt Dillion	906	0.22%	N/A
Majority		58,299	14.11%	+8.36%
Turnout		413,056		
Republican gain from Democratic		Swing		

== See also ==
- 1976 United States Senate elections
