= Harrison Schmitt =

American politician, astronaut and lunar explorer (born 1935)

Jack Schmitt
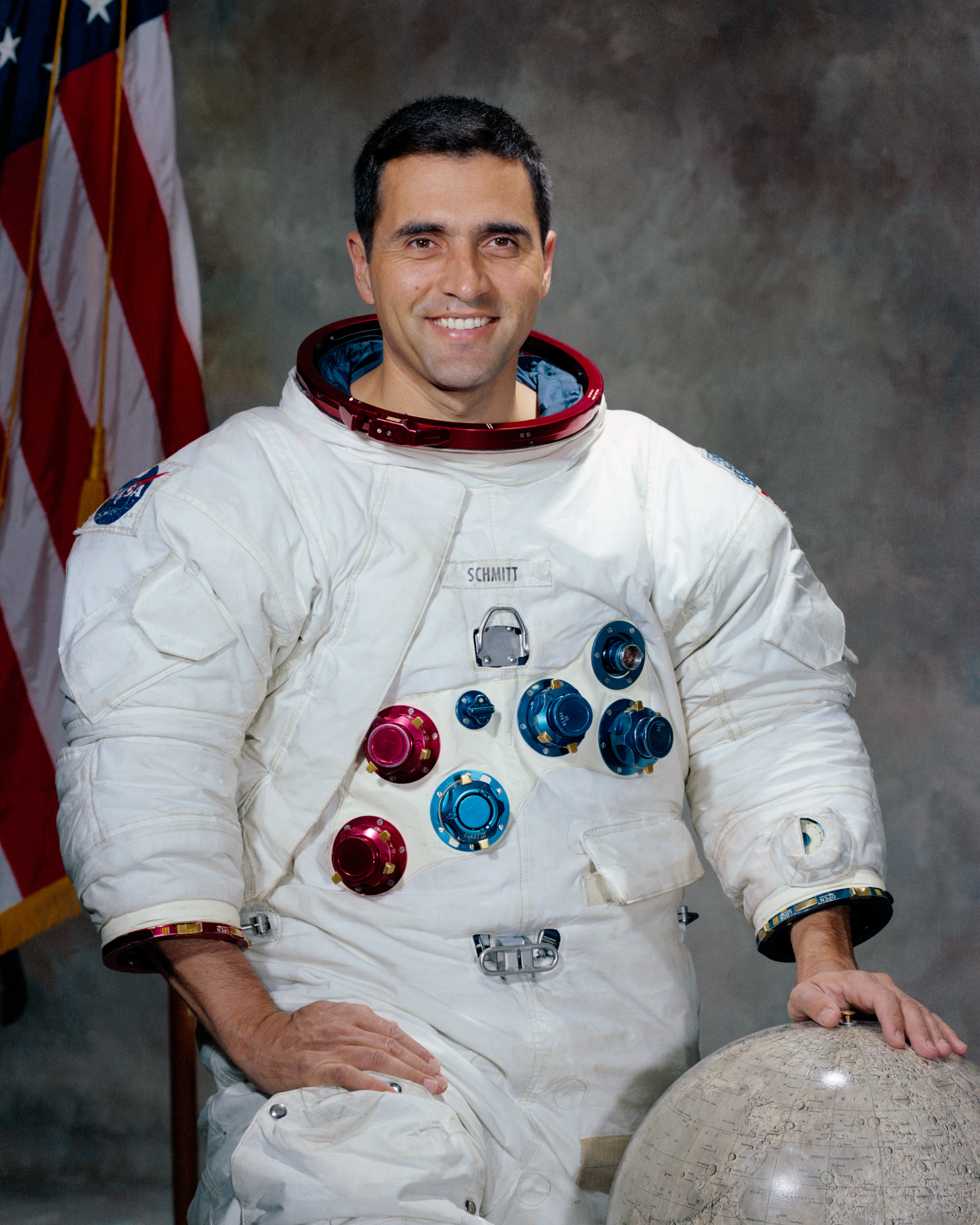
- Schmitt in 1971

United States Senator from New Mexico
- In office January 3, 1977 – January 3, 1983
- Preceded by: Joseph Montoya
- Succeeded by: Jeff Bingaman

Personal details
- Born: Harrison Hagan Schmitt; July 3, 1935 (age 91) Santa Rita, New Mexico, U.S.
- Party: Republican
- Spouse: Teresa Fitzgibbon
- Education: California Institute of Technology (BS); University of Oslo (attended); Harvard University (MS, PhD)
- Awards: NASA Distinguished Service Medal; G. K. Gilbert Award (1988)
- Space career

NASA astronaut
- Time in space: 12d 13h 52m
- Selection: NASA Group 4 (1965)
- Total EVAs: 3 on the lunar surface
- Total EVA time: 22h 3m
- Mission: Apollo 17
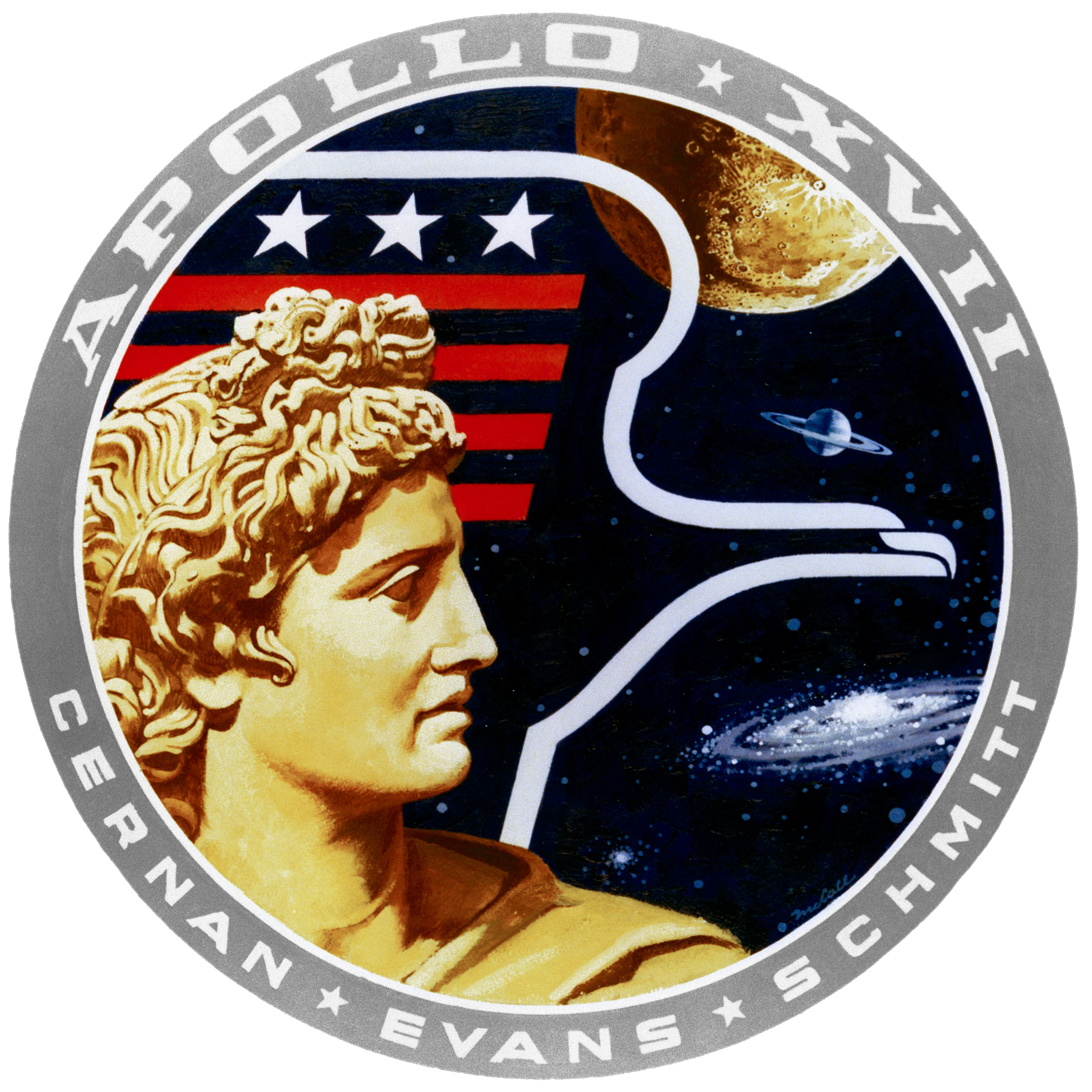
- Mission insignia
- Retired: August 30, 1975
- Scientific career
- Fields: Geology
- Workplaces: U.S. Geological Survey; University of Wisconsin, Madison
- Thesis: Petrology and Structure of the Eiksundsdal Eclogite Complex, Hareidland, Sunnmøre, Norway (1964)

Harrison Hagan "Jack" Schmitt (born July 3, 1935) is an American geologist, former NASA astronaut, university professor, and former U.S. senator from New Mexico. He is the most recent living person—and only person without a background in military aviation—to have walked on the Moon.

In December 1972, as a crewmember of Apollo 17, Schmitt became the first member of NASA's first scientist-astronaut group to fly in space. As Apollo 17 was the last of the Apollo missions, he became the twelfth and second-youngest person to walk on the Moon and the second-to-last person to step off the Moon (he boarded the Lunar Module shortly before commander Eugene Cernan). Schmitt remains the only professional scientist to have landed on the Moon. Before training for Apollo 17, he was influential in the geology field for supporting the Apollo program and had helped train Apollo astronauts chosen to visit the lunar surface.

Schmitt resigned from NASA in August 1975 to run for election to the United States Senate as a member from New Mexico. As the Republican candidate in the 1976 election, he defeated Democratic incumbent Joseph Montoya. In the 1982 election, Schmitt was defeated by Democrat Jeff Bingaman.

== Biography ==
=== Early life and education ===
Born July 3, 1935, in Santa Rita, New Mexico, Schmitt grew up in nearby Silver City, and is a graduate of the Western High School (Class of 1953). He received a Bachelor of Science degree with special field in geology from the California Institute of Technology in 1957 and then spent a year studying geology at the University of Oslo in Norway, as a Fulbright Scholar. He received a Doctor of Philosophy in geology from Harvard University in 1964, based on his geological field studies in Norway.

=== NASA career ===
Before joining NASA as a member of the first group of scientist-astronauts in June 1965, Schmitt worked at the U.S. Geological Survey's Astrogeology Center at Flagstaff, Arizona, developing geological field techniques that would be used by the Apollo crews. Following his selection, Schmitt spent his first year at Air Force UPT learning to become a jet pilot. Upon his return to the astronaut corps in Houston, he played a key role in training Apollo crews to be geologic observers when they were in lunar orbit and competent geologic field workers when they were on the lunar surface. After each of the landing missions, he participated in the examination and evaluation of the returned lunar samples and helped the crews with the scientific aspects of their mission reports.

Schmitt spent considerable time becoming proficient in the CSM and LM systems. In March 1970 he became the first of the scientist-astronauts to be assigned to space flight, joining Richard F. Gordon Jr. (Commander) and Vance Brand (Command Module Pilot) on the Apollo 15 backup crew. The flight rotation put these three in line to fly as prime crew on the third following mission, Apollo 18. When Apollo 18 and Apollo 19 were canceled in September 1970, the community of lunar geologists supporting Apollo felt so strongly about the need to land a professional geologist on the Moon, that they pressured NASA to reassign Schmitt to a remaining flight. As a result, Schmitt was assigned in August 1971 to fly on Apollo 17, replacing Joe Engle as Lunar Module Pilot. Schmitt landed on the Moon with commander Gene Cernan in December 1972.

Schmitt claims to have taken the photograph of the Earth known as The Blue Marble, one of the most widely distributed photographic images in existence. His Apollo 17 crewmates, Gene Cernan (Mission Commander) and Ronald Evans (Command Module Pilot), have made the same claim, and NASA's official position is to credit all three together.

"Perhaps the hardest thing to get used to on the Moon is that the sky is completely black. There's no blue at all."

— Harrison Schmitt (2022-09-12)

While on the Moon's surface, Schmitt—the only geologist in the astronaut corps—collected the rock sample designated Troctolite 76535, which has been called "without doubt the most interesting sample returned from the Moon". Among other distinctions, it is the central piece of evidence suggesting that the Moon once possessed an active magnetic field.

As he returned to the Lunar Module before Cernan, Schmitt is the next-to-last person to have walked on the Moon's surface. Since the death of Cernan in 2017, Schmitt is the most recent person to have walked on the Moon who is still alive. After the completion of the Apollo 17 mission, Schmitt played an active role in documenting the Apollo geologic results and also took on the task of organizing NASA's Energy Program Office.

On April 29, 2018, the Schmitt Space Communicator SC-1x named in his honor was carried aboard the Blue Origin New Shepard crew capsule in a project partly funded by NASA. It launched the first commercial two-way data and Wi-Fi hotspot service in space and sent the first commercial Twitter message from space. The three-pound (1.4 kg) device was developed by Solstar, which Schmitt had joined as an advisor, and launched 66 miles (106 km) above the Earth's surface, just past the edge of space, as a technology demonstration. The device was admitted to the Smithsonian National Air and Space Museum.

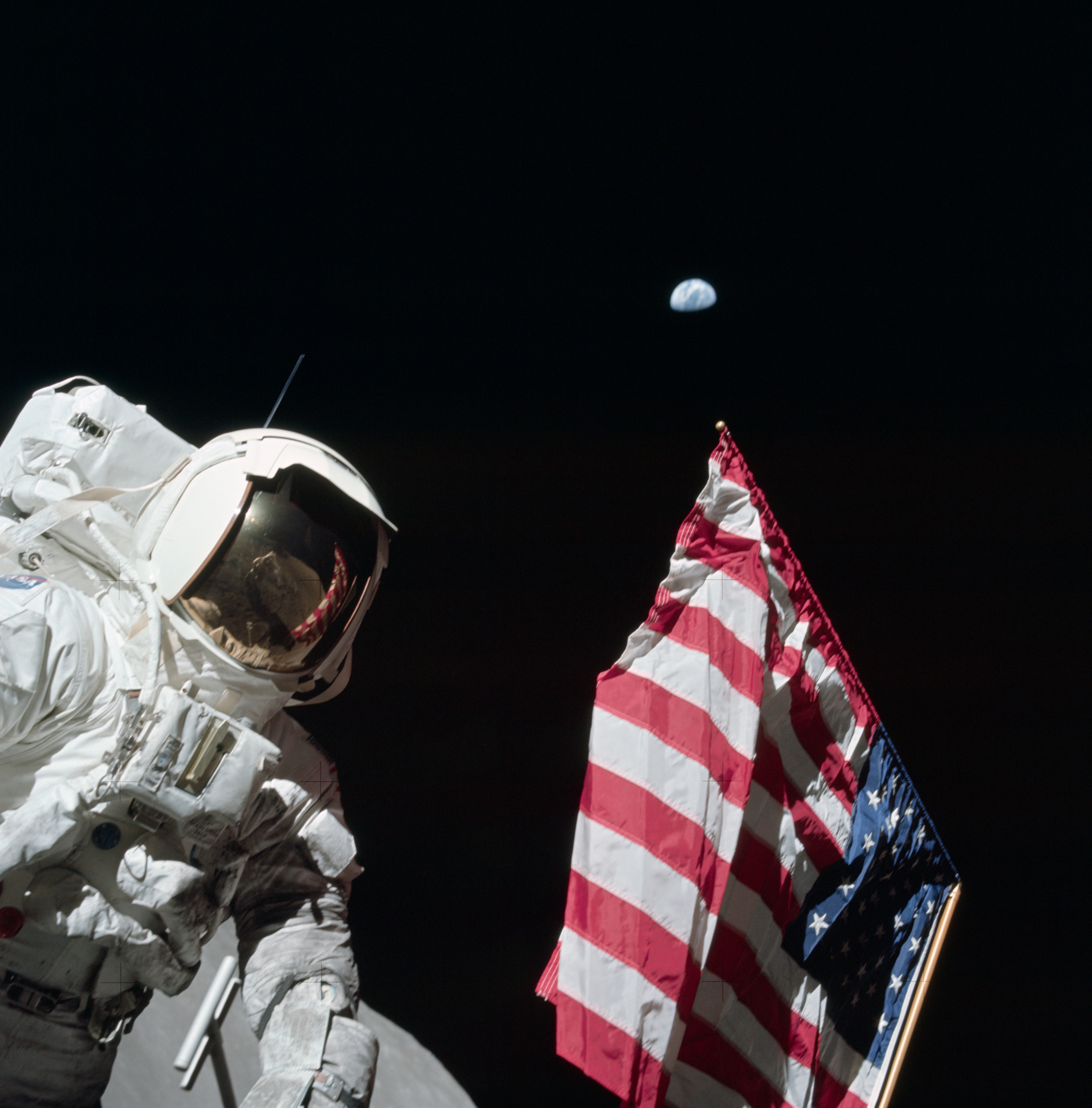
Schmitt poses by the American flag, with Earth in the background, during Apollo 17's first EVA.

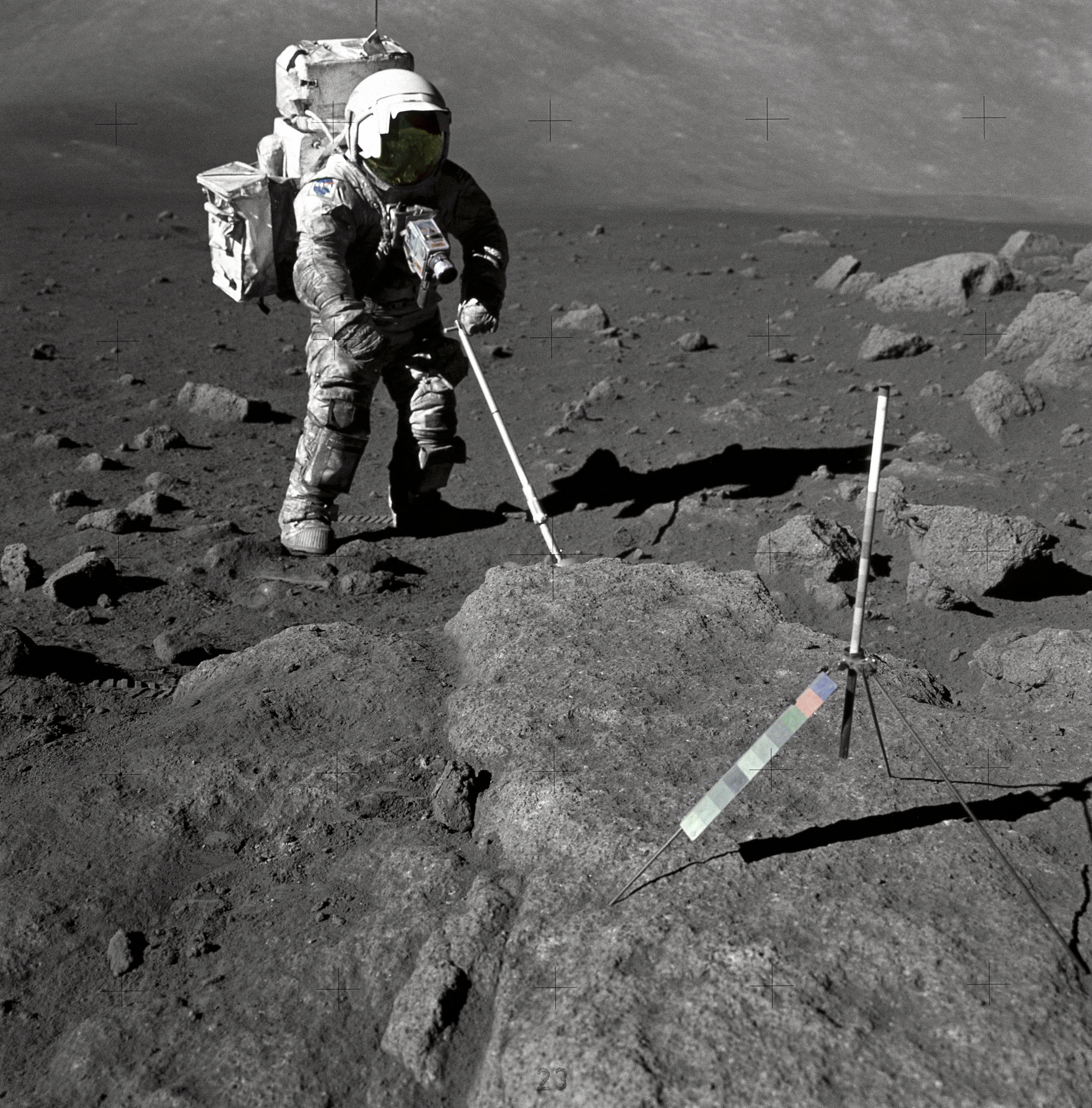
Schmitt collects lunar specimens during the Apollo 17 mission.

Schmitt falls while on a Moonwalk.

Astronauts Harrison Schmitt and Eugene Cernan singing "While Strolling Through the Park One Day" on the Moon during the Apollo 17 mission

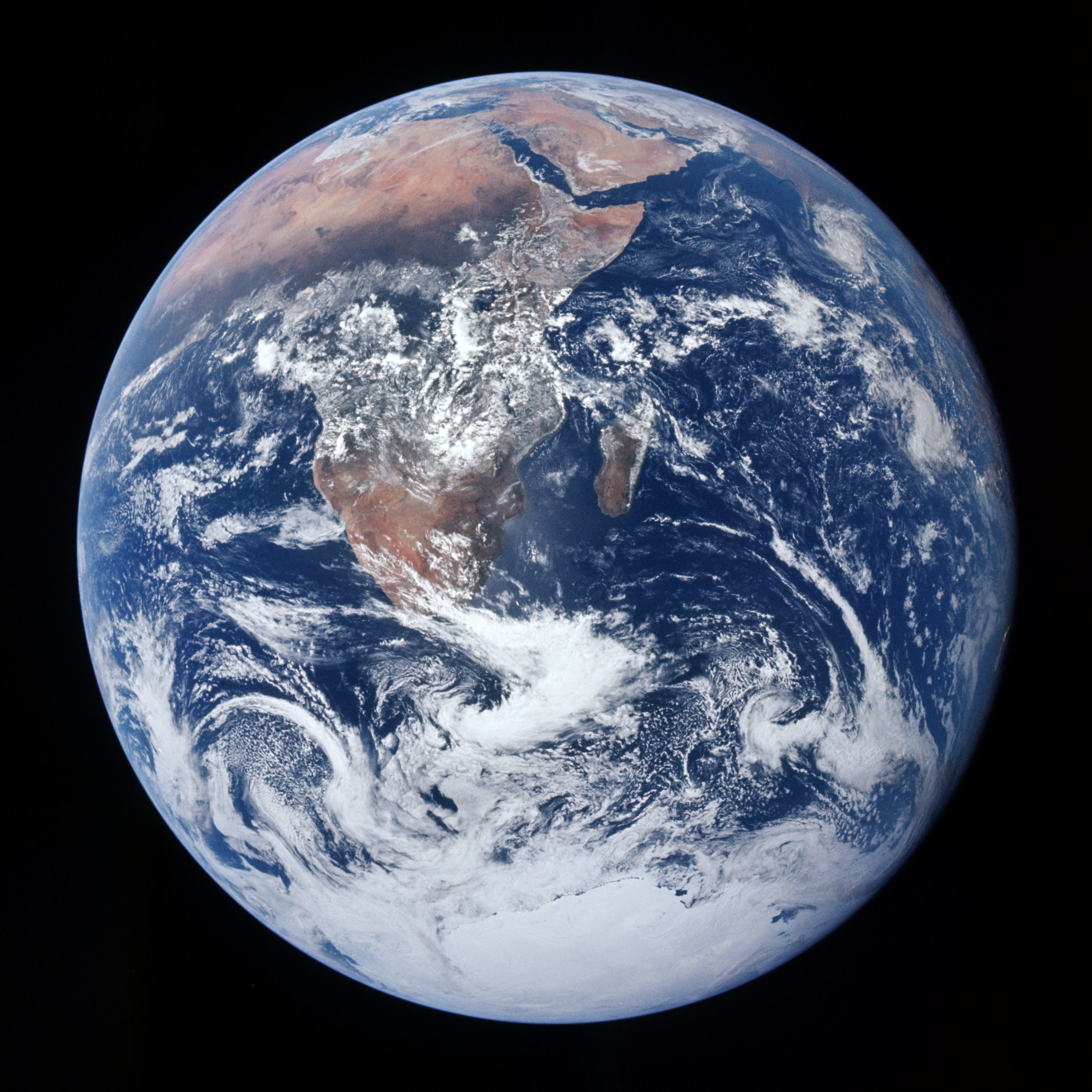
The Blue Marble, an iconic photograph of Earth, is credited to the three crewmen of Apollo 17

=== Senate career ===
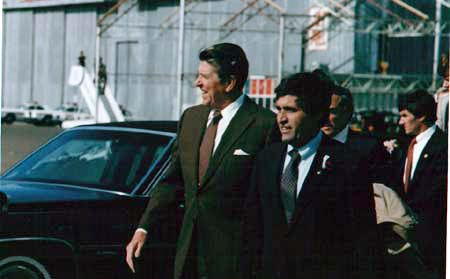
Senator Schmitt with President Ronald Reagan in Roswell, New Mexico, October 1982

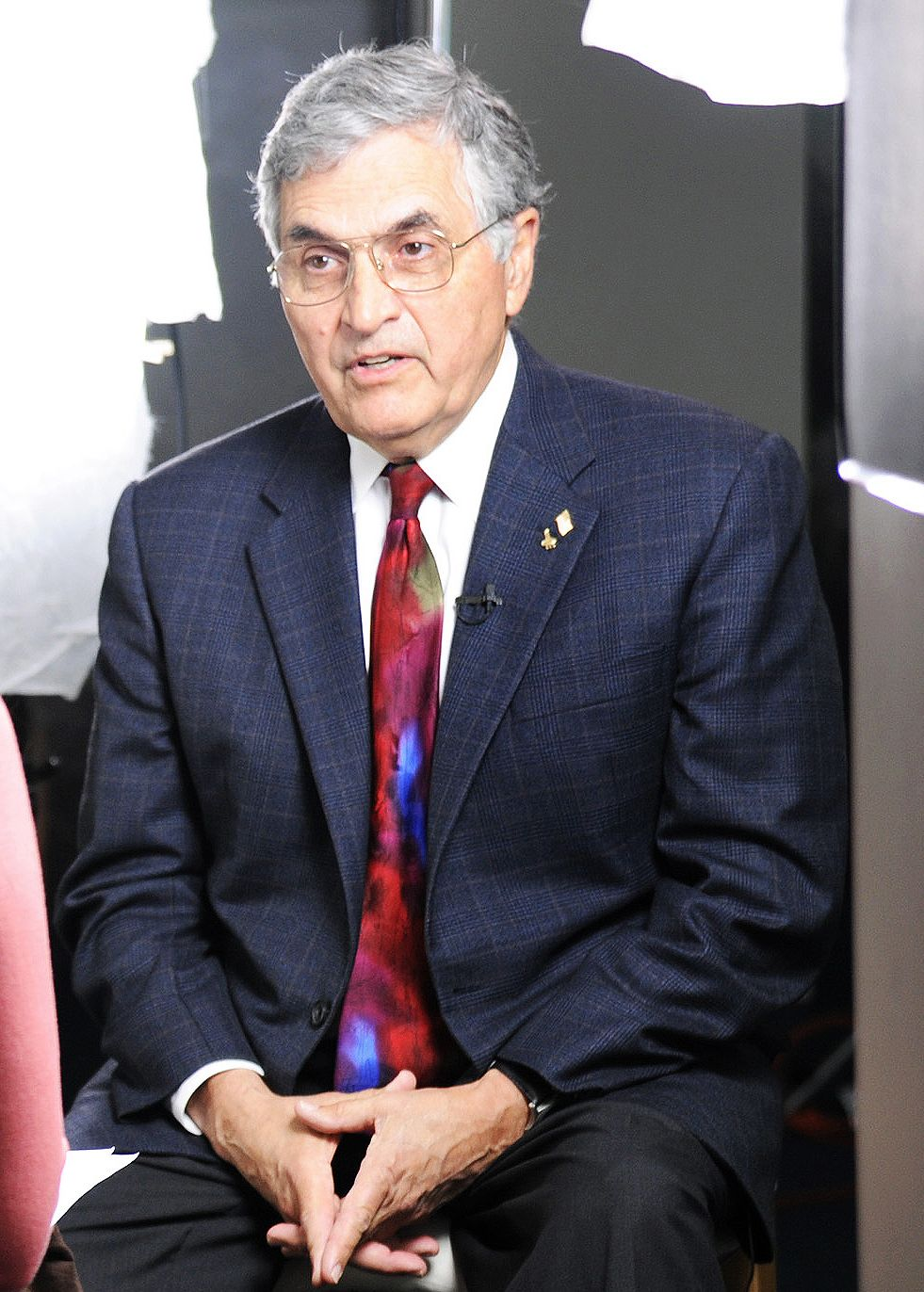
Schmitt in 2009

On August 30, 1975, Schmitt retired from NASA to seek election as a Republican to the United States Senate representing New Mexico in the 1976 election. The astronaut-politician campaigned for fourteen months, and his campaign focused on the future. In the Republican primary, held on June 1, 1976, Schmitt defeated the unknown Eugene Peirce. In the election, Schmitt opposed two-term Democratic incumbent Joseph Montoya. He defeated Montoya 57% to 43%.

Schmitt served one term and, notably, was the chairman of the Science, Technology, and Space Subcommittee of the United States Senate Committee on Commerce. He sought a second term in 1982, facing state Attorney General Jeff Bingaman. Bingaman criticized Schmitt for not paying enough attention to local matters; his campaign slogan asked, "What on Earth has he done for you lately?" This, combined with the deep recession, proved too much for Schmitt to overcome; he was defeated, 54% to 46%.

=== Post-Senate career ===
Following his Senate term, Schmitt has been a consultant in business, geology, space, and public policy. Schmitt is an adjunct professor of engineering physics at the University of Wisconsin–Madison, and has long been a proponent of lunar resource utilization. In 1997 he proposed the Interlune InterMars Initiative, listing among its goals the advancement of private-sector acquisition and use of lunar resources, particularly lunar helium-3 as a fuel for notional nuclear fusion reactors.

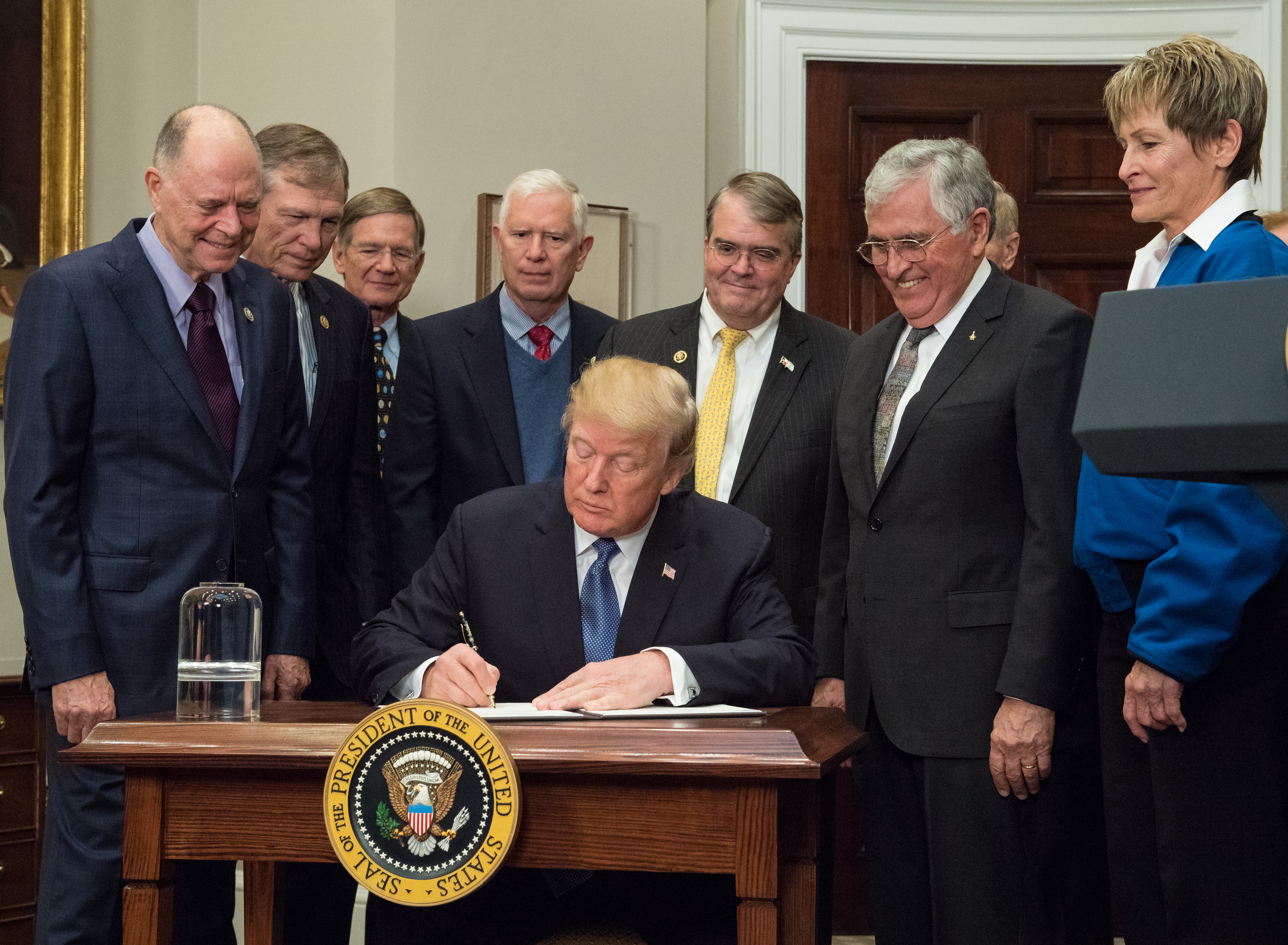
Schmitt (second from right) attends President Donald Trump's signing of Space Policy Directive-1, directing NASA to resume human flight to the Moon and beyond

Schmitt was chair of the NASA Advisory Council, whose mandate is to provide technical advice to the NASA Administrator, from November 2005 until his abrupt resignation on October 16, 2008. In November 2008, he quit the Planetary Society over policy advocacy differences, citing the organization's statements on "focusing on Mars as the driving goal of human spaceflight" (Schmitt said that going back to the Moon would speed progress toward a crewed Mars mission), on "accelerating research into global climate change through more comprehensive Earth observations" (Schmitt voiced objections to the notion of a present "scientific consensus" on climate change as any policy guide), and on international cooperation (which he felt would retard rather than accelerate progress), among other points of divergence.

Schmitt also serves as a visiting senior research scientist at the Florida Institute for Human & Machine Cognition.

In January 2011, he was appointed as secretary of the New Mexico Energy, Minerals and Natural Resources Department in the cabinet of Governor Susana Martinez, but was forced to give up the appointment the following month after refusing to submit to a required background investigation. El Paso Times called him the "most celebrated" candidate for New Mexico energy secretary.

Schmitt wrote a book entitled Return to the Moon: Exploration, Enterprise, and Energy in the Human Settlement of Space in 2006. Schmitt is also involved in several civic projects, including the improvement of the Senator Harrison H. Schmitt Big Sky Hang Glider Park in Albuquerque, New Mexico.

== Views on climate change ==
Schmitt has rejected the scientific consensus on climate change, which states that climate change is real, progressing, dangerous, and primarily human-caused. He has claimed that climate change is predominantly caused by natural factors, as opposed to human activity. Schmitt has argued that the risks posed by climate change are overstated and has instead supported the notion that climate change is a "tool" used to advocate for the expansion of the government.

Schmitt resigned from the Planetary Society due to disagreements over their "Roadmap to Space Exploration", which recommended prioritizing earlier human missions to Mars over U.S. lunar expeditions. He believed lunar exploration was crucial for Mars missions, stating, "The fastest way to get to Mars is by way of the Moon." Additionally, Schmitt criticized the society's stance on global warming, writing in his resignation letter that the "'global warming scare' is being used as a political tool to increase government control over American lives, incomes and decision making," asserting it should not be part of the Society's activities. Schmitt spoke at the March 2009 International Conference on Climate Change, an anthropogenic climate change denier event hosted by the conservative Heartland Institute, where he said that climate change was a "stalking horse for National Socialism." He appeared in December that year on the Fox Business Network, saying that "[t]he CO_{2} scare is a red herring".

In a 2009 interview with radio host Alex Jones, Schmitt asserted a link between the collapse of the Soviet Union and the American environmental movement: "I think the whole trend really began with the fall of the Soviet Union. Because the great champion of the opponents of liberty, namely communism, had to find some other place to go and they basically went into the environmental movement."

In 2013, Schmitt co-authored an opinion column in The Wall Street Journal with William Happer, contending that increasing levels of carbon dioxide in the atmosphere are not significantly correlated with global warming, attributing the "single-minded demonization of this natural and essential atmospheric gas" to advocates of government control of energy production. Noting a positive relationship between crop resistance to drought and increasing carbon dioxide levels, the authors argued, "Contrary to what some would have us believe, increased carbon dioxide in the atmosphere will benefit the increasing population on the planet by increasing agricultural productivity."

== In popular culture ==
- Schmitt was portrayed by Tom Amandes in the 1998 miniseries From the Earth to the Moon.
- Schmitt appeared in a 1993 episode of Bill Nye the Science Guy.
- Comedian Norm Macdonald mentioned Schmitt in his stand-up routine from at least 2015 until shortly before his death, joking about Schmitt's relative obscurity despite being one of only a few people to ever walk on the Moon.
- Schmitt was mentioned in the King of the Hill episode "Maid in Arlen". He was shown as a cardboard model.

== Awards and honors ==
- NASA Distinguished Service Medal (1973)
- He was made an honorary fellow of the Geological Society of America for his efforts in geoscience in 1984.
- 1989 Recipient of the G. K. Gilbert Award
- One of the elementary schools in Schmitt's hometown of Silver City, New Mexico was named in his honor in the mid-1970s. An image of the astronaut riding a rocket through space is displayed on the front of Harrison Schmitt Elementary School.
- AAPG's Special Award has been changed to the Harrison Schmitt Award in 2011. It recognizes individuals or organizations that, for a variety of reasons, do not qualify for other Association honors or awards. Schmitt received the award in 1973 for his contribution as the first geologist to land on the Moon and study its geology.
- 2015 Recipient of the Leif Erikson Exploration Award, awarded by The Exploration Museum, for his scientific work on the surface of the Moon in 1972, and for his part in the geology training of all the astronauts that walked on the Moon before him.

Schmitt was one of five inductees into the International Space Hall of Fame in 1977. He was one of 24 Apollo astronauts who were inducted into the U.S. Astronaut Hall of Fame in 1997.

He was present and honored during President Donald Trump's America 250 speech on the National Mall on July 4, 2026, along with the crew of the Artemis II lunar flyby that took place that April.

== Media ==
Schmitt is one of the astronauts featured in the 2007 documentary In the Shadow of the Moon. He also contributed to the 2006 book NASA's Scientist-Astronauts by David Shayler and Colin Burgess.

== Electoral history ==
1976 U.S. Senate election in New Mexico
| Party | Candidate | Votes | % | ±% |
|---|---|---|---|---|
| Republican | Harrison Schmitt | 234,681 | 56.82 | +10.25% |
| Democratic | Joseph Montoya (incumbent) | 176,382 | 42.7 | −9.56% |
| Raza Unida | Ernesto B. Borunda | 1,087 | 0.26 | N/A |
| American Independent | Malcolm "Matt" Dillon | 906 | 0.22 | N/A |
| Total votes | | 413,056 | 100.0 | N/A |
| Republican gain from Democratic | | | | |

1982 U.S. Senate election in New Mexico
| Party | Candidate | Votes | % | ±% |
|---|---|---|---|---|
| Democratic | Jeff Bingaman | 217,682 | 53.77 | +11.07% |
| Republican | Harrison Schmitt (incumbent) | 187,128 | 46.23 | −10.59% |
| Total votes | | 404,810 | 100.0 | N/A |
| Democratic gain from Republican | | | | |

== See also ==
- The Astronaut Monument

Party political offices
| Preceded by Anderson Carter | Republican nominee for U.S. Senator from New Mexico (Class 1); 1976, 1982 | Succeeded by Bill Valentine |
U.S. Senate
| Preceded by Joseph Montoya | U.S. Senator (Class 1) from New Mexico; 1977–1983; Served alongside: Pete Domenici | Succeeded by Jeff Bingaman |
U.S. order of precedence (ceremonial)
| Preceded by Mitt Romney as Former U.S. Senator | Order of precedence of the United States | Succeeded by Jeff Flake as Former U.S. Senator |
