= 1982 United States Senate election in New Mexico =

- November 2, 1982
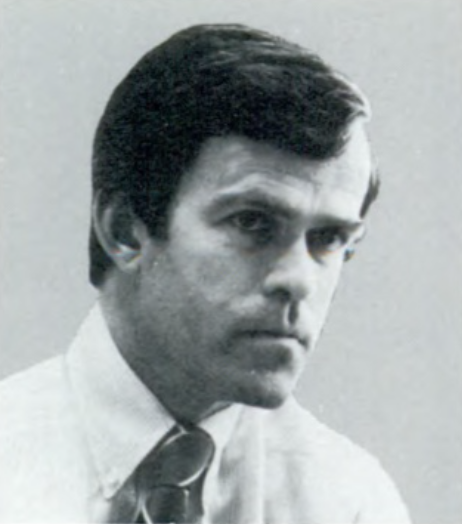

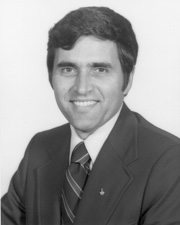
Nominee	Jeff Bingaman	Harrison Schmitt
Party	Democratic	Republican
Popular vote	217,682	187,128
Percentage	53.77%	46.23%
- County results Bingaman: 50–60% 60–70% 70–80% Schmitt: 50–60% 60–70%
U.S. senator before election
Harrison Schmitt
Republican
Elected U.S. Senator
Jeff Bingaman
Democratic

The 1982 United States Senate election in New Mexico took place on November 2, 1982. Incumbent Republican U.S. Senator Harrison Schmitt was running for re-election to a second term, but lost to Democratic state attorney general Jeff Bingaman. As of 2026, this is the last time an incumbent senator lost re-election in New Mexico.

== Democratic primary ==
=== Candidates ===
- Jeff Bingaman, Attorney General of New Mexico
- Jerry Apodaca, former Governor of New Mexico
- Virginia Keehan

=== Results ===
Democratic primary results
Party	Candidate	Votes	%
Democratic	Jeff Bingaman	91,780	54.36
Democratic	Jerry Apodaca	66,598	39.44
Democratic	Virginia Keehan	10,466	6.20
Total votes		168,844	100.00

== General election ==
=== Candidates ===
- Jeff Bingaman, Attorney General of New Mexico (Democratic)
- Harrison Schmitt, incumbent U.S. Senator first elected in 1976 and former astronaut (Republican)

=== Campaign ===
Bingaman ran advertisements that criticized Schmitt's views on a minimum Social Security and mining on federally protected land. Schmitt countered these ads by criticizing Bingaman's work as attorney general, citing the handling of the 1980 state prison riot and asking the governor to pardon an inmate that was on the FBI's 10 Most Wanted List. Another ad that Bingaman ran asked, "What on Earth has he done for you lately?"

The two negative ads that Schmitt ran were received poorly and later pulled.

=== Results ===
The turnout was approximately 70%.

United States Senate election in New Mexico, 1982
Party	Candidate	Votes	%	±%
Democratic	Jeff Bingaman	217,682	53.77%	+11.07%
Republican	Harrison Schmitt (incumbent)	187,128	46.23%	−10.59%
Majority		30,554	7.55%	−6.57%
Turnout		404,810		
Democratic gain from Republican		Swing		

== Aftermath ==
Schmitt thought the media was biased against him during the campaign.

== See also ==
- 1982 United States Senate elections
