= 2006 United States Senate election in New Mexico =

- November 7, 2006
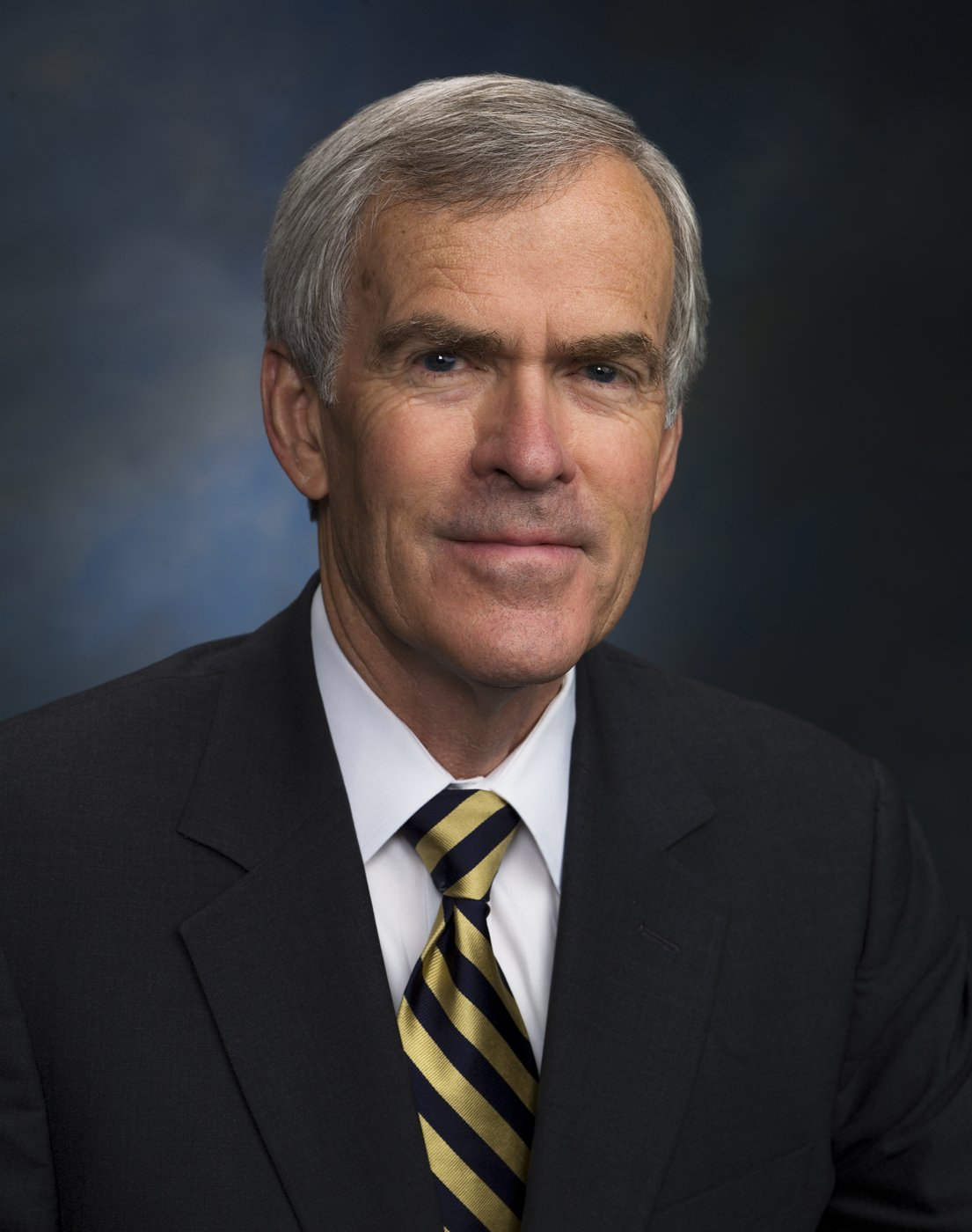

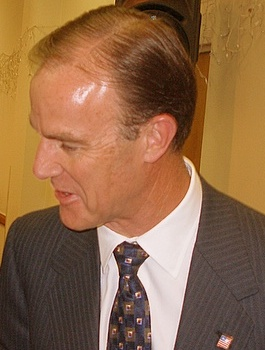
Nominee	Jeff Bingaman	Allen McCulloch
Party	Democratic	Republican
Popular vote	394,217	163,761
Percentage	70.60%	29.33%
- County results Bingaman: 50–60% 60–70% 70–80% 80–90%
U.S. senator before election
Jeff Bingaman
Democratic
Elected U.S. Senator
Jeff Bingaman
Democratic

The 2006 United States Senate election in New Mexico took place on November 7, 2006. The primaries were held June 6, 2006. Incumbent Democrat Jeff Bingaman won re-election to a fifth term in a landslide. This was one of five Democratic-held Senate seats up for election in a state that George W. Bush won in the 2004 presidential election.

As of 2026, this was the last time a Democratic Senate candidate, as well as any candidate in New Mexico, has won all 33 of New Mexico's counties.

== Democratic primary ==
=== Candidates ===
- Jeff Bingaman, incumbent U.S. Senator

=== Results ===
Democratic primary results
Party	Candidate	Votes	%
Democratic	Jeff Bingaman (incumbent)	115,198	100.00
Total votes		115,198	100.00

== Republican primary ==
=== Candidates ===
- Joe Carraro, State Senator
- Allen McCulloch, physician
- David Pfeffer, Santa Fe City Councilman

=== Campaign ===
Pfeffer announced on August 23, 2005, that he would be entering the primary. A former Democrat, he supported George W. Bush in 2004 and became a Republican in 2005. In his campaign announcement, Pfeffer focused mainly on border controls with Mexico. He criticised Bingaman in comparison to his own support for reform of the Social Security system and the Iraq War as well as U.S. relations with China, saying "With all due respect, I do not believe the present occupier of the junior seat from New Mexico is doing all that can and should be done on these fronts," he said of Bingaman. "I believe I can do a better job..." Pfeffer also commented that he would have a hard time raising an amount equivalent to Senator Bingaman, a problem faced by any of the latter's potential challengers.

=== Results ===
Republican primary results
Party	Candidate	Votes	%
Republican	Allen McCulloch	29,592	51.04
Republican	Joseph J. Carraro	18,312	31.59
Republican	David Pfeffer	10,070	17.37
Total votes		57,974	100.00

== General election ==
=== Candidates ===
- Jeff Bingaman (D), incumbent U.S. Senator
- Allen McCulloch (R), physician

=== Campaign ===
Bingaman had a 60% approval rating in one poll. He faced no primary opposition. There had been speculation that Bingaman would give up the chance to run for another term to pursue a lobbyists' job in Washington.

=== Debates ===
- Complete video of debate, October 26, 2006

=== Predictions ===
Source	Ranking	As of
The Cook Political Report	Solid D	November 6, 2006
Sabato's Crystal Ball	Safe D	November 6, 2006
Rothenberg Political Report	Safe D	November 6, 2006
Real Clear Politics	Safe D	November 6, 2006

=== Polling ===
Source	Date	Jeff Bingaman (D)	Allen McCulloch (R)
Zogby	March 22, 2006	53%	29%
Rasmussen	June 30, 2006	59%	33%
Albuquerque Journal/Research & Polling	August 31, 2006	62%	23%
Rasmussen	September 7, 2006	61%	26%
Albuquerque Journal/Research & Polling	October 3, 2006	65%	19%

=== Results ===
United States Senate election in New Mexico, 2006
Party	Candidate	Votes	%	±%
Democratic	Jeff Bingaman (incumbent)	394,217	70.60%	+8.89%
Republican	Allen McCulloch	163,761	29.33%	−8.92%
Write-in		364	0.06%	
Majority		230,426	41.27%	+17.83%
Turnout		558,342		
Democratic hold		Swing		

==== Counties that flipped from Republican to Democratic ====
- Curry (largest village: Clovis)
- Lincoln (largest city: Roidoso)
- Roosevelt (largest city: Portales)
- San Juan (largest city: Farmington)
- Union (largest city: Clayton)
- Catron (largest city: Reserve)

== See also ==
- 2006 United States Senate elections
