= 1988 United States Senate election in New Mexico =

- November 8, 1988
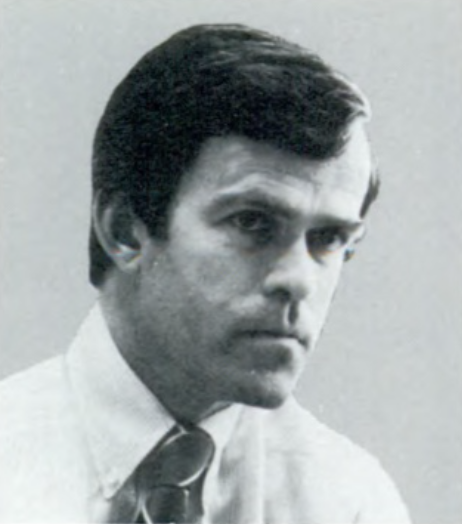

Nominee	Jeff Bingaman	Bill Valentine
Party	Democratic	Republican
Popular vote	321,983	186,579
Percentage	63.31%	36.68%
- County results Bingaman: 50–60% 60–70% 70–80% 80–90% Valentine: 50–60%
U.S. senator before election
Jeff Bingaman
Democratic
Elected U.S. Senator
Jeff Bingaman
Democratic

The 1988 United States Senate election in New Mexico took place on November 8, 1988. Incumbent Democrat Jeff Bingaman won re-election to a second term against Bill Valentine despite Republican presidential nominee George H.W. Bush winning New Mexico over Michael Dukakis in the concurrent presidential election.

== General election ==
=== Candidates ===
- Jeff Bingaman (D), incumbent U.S. Senator first elected in 1982
- Bill Valentine (R), New Mexico State Senator

=== Results ===
General election results
Party	Candidate	Votes	%	±%
Democratic	Jeff Bingaman (Incumbent)	321,983	63.31%	+9.53%
Republican	Bill Valentine	186,579	36.68%	−9.54%
Write-ins		36	0.01%	
Majority		135,404	26.62%	+19.08%
Turnout		508,598		
Democratic hold		Swing		

== See also ==
- 1988 United States Senate elections
