= Jeff Bingaman =

American politician (born 1943)

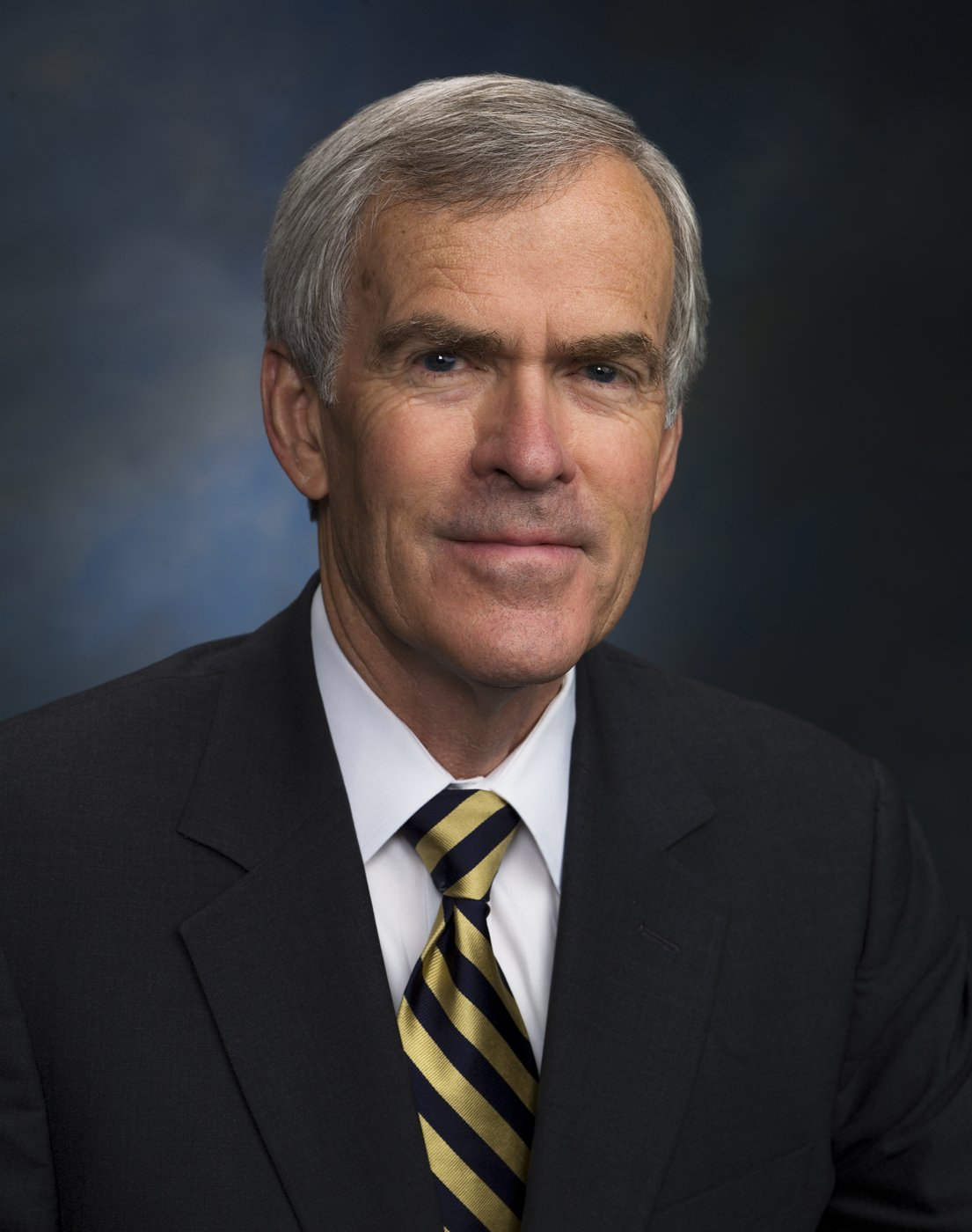
- Official portrait, 2008

Chair of the Senate Energy Committee
- In office January 3, 2007 – January 3, 2013
- Preceded by: Pete Domenici
- Succeeded by: Ron Wyden
- In office June 6, 2001 – January 3, 2003
- Preceded by: Frank Murkowski
- Succeeded by: Pete Domenici
- In office January 3, 2001 – January 20, 2001
- Preceded by: Frank Murkowski
- Succeeded by: Frank Murkowski

United States Senator from New Mexico
- In office January 3, 1983 – January 3, 2013
- Preceded by: Harrison Schmitt
- Succeeded by: Martin Heinrich

25th Attorney General of New Mexico
- In office January 1, 1979 – January 1, 1983
- Governor: Bruce King
- Preceded by: Toney Anaya
- Succeeded by: Paul Bardacke

Personal details
- Born: Jesse Francis Bingaman Jr. October 3, 1943 (age 83) El Paso, Texas, U.S.
- Party: Democratic
- Spouse: Anne Kovacovich
- Children: 1 son
- Education: Harvard University (BA); Stanford University (JD)

Military service
- Branch/service: United States Army
- Years of service: 1968–1974
- Unit: United States Army Reserve
- Bingaman's voice Bingaman on the partial shutdown of the Federal Aviation Administration. Recorded July 28, 2011

Jesse Francis "Jeff" Bingaman Jr. (born October 3, 1943) is an American retired politician who served as a United States senator from New Mexico from 1983 to 2013. A member of the Democratic Party, he previously served as the 25th Attorney General of New Mexico from 1979 to 1983. During his time in the Senate, Bingaman served as Chairman of Committee Outreach for the Senate Democratic Caucus and was the longtime chair of the Senate Energy Committee.

Bingaman worked on Congressional committees on Armed Services; Energy and Natural Resources (Chairman); Finance; Health, Education Labor & Pensions; Joint Economic Committee; among others. He advocated environmental issues such as for clean energy policies and protection of wildlife and public lands. Bingaman took positions favoring immigration reform with increased border enforcement coupled with a guest worker program.

After he left the Senate, he returned to his alma mater Stanford Law School as a fellow of its Steyer–Taylor Center for Energy Policy and Finance.

== Early life ==
Bingaman was born in El Paso, Texas, the son of Frances Bethia (née Ball) and Jesse Francis Bingaman. He grew up in Silver City, New Mexico. His father taught at Western New Mexico University and his mother taught in the public schools system. At age 15, he earned the rank of Eagle Scout.

After graduating from Silver High School in 1961, Bingaman went on to earn a Bachelor of Arts degree in government from Harvard University in 1965. He then entered Stanford Law School, graduating with a Juris Doctor in 1968.

After his admission to the bar, Bingaman commenced work as a private practice attorney alongside his wife. He also served as counsel to the New Mexico Constitutional Convention of 1969. From 1968 to 1974, Bingaman was a member of the U.S. Army Reserve. He attended basic training at Fort Dix, New Jersey, as a private and graduated from the chaplain enlisted assistant technician course at the Army Chaplain School, Fort Hamilton, New Jersey in April 1969.

== State Attorney General ==
Bingaman worked briefly in the state attorney general's office. He then ran for the leadership position of this office in 1978 and was elected. Environmental and antitrust issues were some of his biggest concerns while in this position.

== U.S. Senate ==
=== Committee assignments ===
- Committee on Armed Services
  - Subcommittee on Emerging Threats and Capabilities
  - Subcommittee on Personnel
  - Subcommittee on Strategic Forces
- Committee on Energy and Natural Resources (Chairman)
- Committee on Finance
  - Subcommittee on Health Care
  - Subcommittee on Energy, Natural Resources, and Infrastructure (Chairman)
  - Subcommittee on International Trade, Customs, and Global Competitiveness
  - Subcommittee on Fiscal Responsibility and Economic Growth
- Committee on Health, Education, Labor, and Pensions
  - Subcommittee on Children and Families
  - Subcommittee on Primary Health and Aging
- Joint Economic Committee

=== Caucus memberships ===
- Congressional Competitiveness Caucus (Co-Chair)
- International Conservation Caucus
- Senate Diabetes Caucus

=== Tenure ===
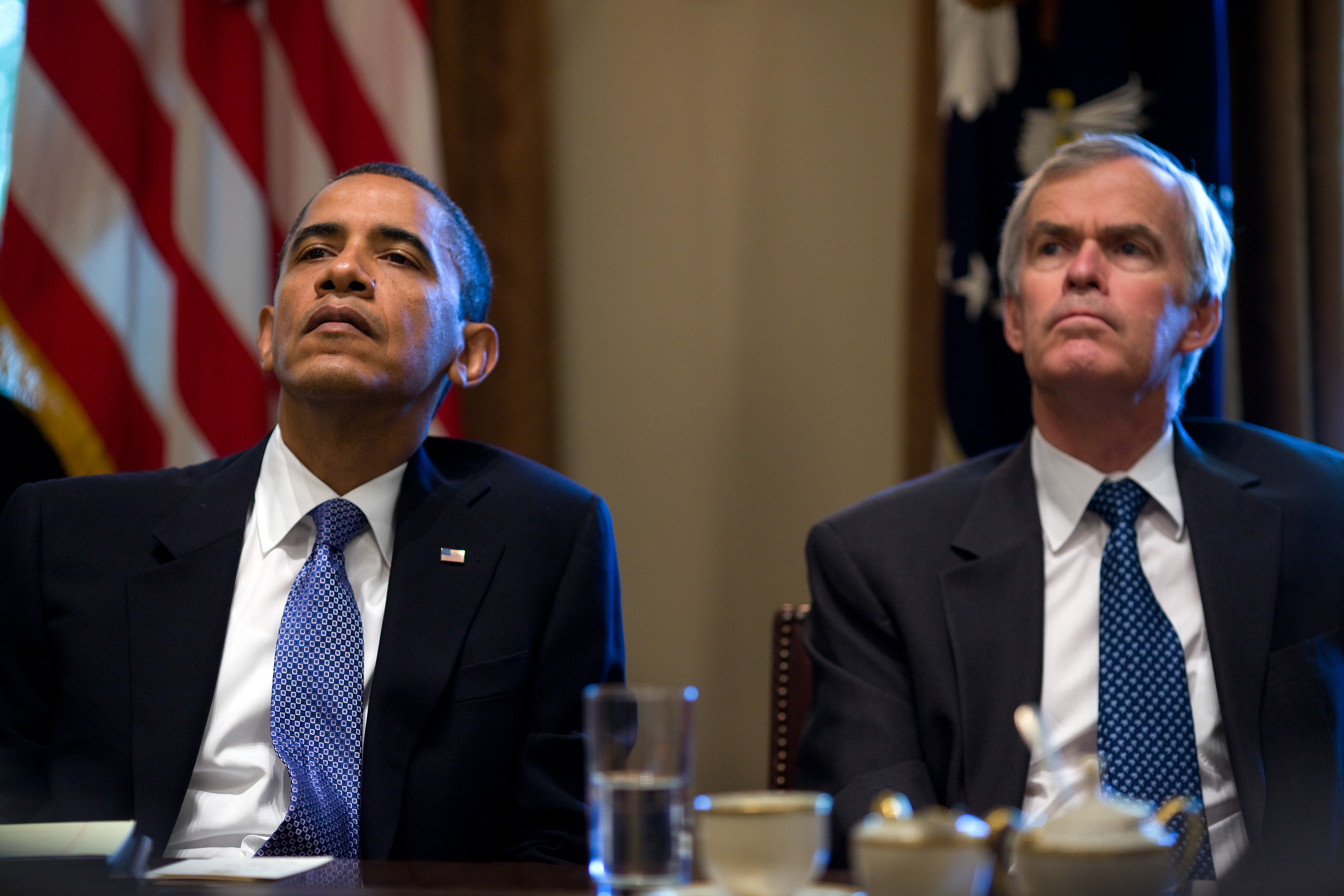
Bingaman with President Obama in 2010

Limited to seek other statewide office by the state constitution, Bingaman announced on January 14, 1981, his candidacy for the U.S. Senate, the first to do so. In 1982, Bingaman was elected to the Senate, defeating one-term Republican incumbent Harrison Schmitt. Bingaman accused Schmitt of not paying enough attention to local matters; his campaign slogan was "What on Earth has he done for you lately?"—a jab at Schmitt's previous service as an astronaut who had walked on the Moon. He was reelected four times.

Bingaman was Chairman of the Energy and Natural Resources Committee and a member of the Finance Committee; Health, Education, Labor, and Pensions Committee; and Joint Committee on the Economy.

Generally, Bingaman kept a fairly low national profile, even though he was the ninth most senior member of the Senate at the time of his retirement. He was very popular in New Mexico, facing substantive opposition only once, in 1994.

Bingaman and his Senate colleague Pete Domenici were the longest-serving duo among senators in the 110th United States Congress (2007–2009). In second place were Ted Kennedy and John Kerry of Massachusetts. Due to serving alongside Domenici, the longest-serving Senator in New Mexico's history, Bingaman spent 26 years as New Mexico's junior Senator, though ironically he had more seniority than all but a few of his colleagues. He was the most-senior junior senator in the 110th United States Congress.

On April 28, 2008, Bingaman endorsed Senator Barack Obama for the 2008 Democratic presidential nomination.

On February 18, 2011, Bingaman announced that he would not seek reelection in 2012. He formally retired on January 3, 2013, ending the second-longest Senate tenure in the state's history, behind only Domenici.

In his 2022 book "Breakdown: Lessons for a Congress in Crisis", Bingaman discusses the erosion of congressional norms, outlines five governing obstacles for Congress members, evaluates their impact on eight major legislative actions during his term, and suggests improvements for Congress.

== Political positions ==
=== Immigration ===
Being from a border state with Mexico, Bingaman was highly involved in the debate over illegal immigration. He believed in increased enforcement of borders to stem the flow of illegal immigrants, including more patrol agents and the use of surveillance cameras. However, he also believed that the U.S. should enact a guest worker program so that immigrants looking for honest work could arrive legally. Bingaman voted against the Secure Fence Act in 2006. He also voted against declaring English to be the official language of the U.S. government and voted in favor of continuing federal funds to self-declared "sanctuary cities".

=== Energy and the environment ===
Throughout his political career, Bingaman had a pro-environmental record. He worked consistently to protect wildlife and public lands. He spoke publicly about the necessity of the Clean Energy Act of 2007, citing the importance of developing clean technology and green jobs. He stated his support for the bill's principle of eliminating tax breaks on gas and oil companies.

Starting in 2006, Bingaman worked unsuccessfully to pass a bill that would have reduced greenhouse gas emissions via a "cap and trade" system. He stated his hope of reducing emissions to 1990 levels by 2030. His bill would also have increased federal funding for research and development of green technologies.

=== Social issues ===
Bingaman voted in line with the majority of his party on abortion, and he received a 100% rating from the pro-choice NARAL. He supported reinstating the fairness doctrine. Even though he voted for the Defense of Marriage Act in 1996, he voted against a proposed constitutional amendment to ban gay marriage, and was ranked favorably by gay rights groups (such as 89% from the Human Rights Campaign). He also voted twice against a proposed amendment to ban flag desecration, and supported affirmative action.

=== Iraq War ===
On October 11, 2002, Jeff Bingaman was among 23 senators who voted against authorizing the Iraq War.

=== Crime and torture ===
Bingaman had a generally pro-rehabilitation stance on crime, supporting more programs to prevent youth crime, lower high school dropout rates, and stop drug use. Bingaman was an outspoken critic of the Guantanamo Bay detention camp. He cited the need for due process of law for detainees by saying:

The current practice of holding detainees or prisoners indefinitely, without affording them basic due process rights, has been widely criticized in this country and throughout the world. For a country such as ours that has consistently advocated for the rule of law, the policies of the current administration are nothing short of a major embarrassment ... How we handle prisoners can have a dramatic impact on how our own men and women are treated in the event they are themselves taken prisoner.

=== Health care reform ===
Bingaman supported President Barack Obama's health reform legislation; he voted for the Affordable Care Act (also known as Obamacare) in December 2009, and he voted for the Health Care and Education Reconciliation Act of 2010.

=== STOCK Act ===
Bingaman was one of only three senators who voted against the STOCK Act of 2012, which prohibits members of congress and other government employees from using non-public information for private profit, including trading stock.

== Electoral history ==
1982 U.S. Senate election in New Mexico
Primary election
Party	Candidate	Votes	%
Democratic	Jeff Bingaman	91,780	54.36
Democratic	Jerry Apodaca	66,598	39.44
Democratic	Virginia Keehan	10,466	6.2
Total votes		168,844	100.00
General election
Democratic	Jeff Bingaman	217,682	53.77
Republican	Harrison Schmitt (incumbent)	187,128	46.23
Total votes		404,810	100.00
Democratic gain from Republican			

1988 U.S. Senate election in New Mexico
Primary election
Party	Candidate	Votes	%
General election
Democratic	Jeff Bingaman (incumbent)	321,983	63.31
Republican	Bill Valentine	186,579	36.68
Write-in		36	0.01
Total votes		508,598	100.00
Democratic hold			

1994 U.S. Senate election in New Mexico
Primary election
Party	Candidate	Votes	%
Democratic	Jeff Bingaman (incumbent)	165,148	100.00
Total votes		165,148	100.00
General election
Democratic	Jeff Bingaman (incumbent)	249,989	53.97
Republican	Colin R. McMillan	213,025	45.99
Write-in		182	0.04
Total votes		463,196	100.00
Democratic hold			

2000 U.S. Senate election in New Mexico
Primary election
Party	Candidate	Votes	%
Democratic	Jeff Bingaman (incumbent)	128,887	100.00
Total votes		128,887	100.00
General election
Democratic	Jeff Bingaman (incumbent)	363,744	61.7
Republican	Bill Redmond	225,517	38.25
Write-in		265	0.04
Total votes		589,525	100.00
Democratic hold			

2006 U.S. Senate election in New Mexico
Primary election
Party	Candidate	Votes	%
Democratic	Jeff Bingaman (incumbent)	115,198	100.00
Total votes		115,198	100.00
General election
Democratic	Jeff Bingaman (incumbent)	394,365	70.61
Republican	Allen McCulloch	163,826	29.33
Write-in		376	0.06
Total votes		558,567	100.00
Democratic hold			

== Personal life ==
Bingaman met his wife Anne Kovacovich when both were attending Stanford Law School. They have one son, John, who served as the chief of staff for New Mexico Governor Michelle Lujan Grisham (2019–2020).

== Awards and honors ==
On December 13, 2008, Bingaman was awarded an honorary Doctor of Letters degree from New Mexico State University at the university's Fall 2008 commencement ceremony.

He received the Distinguished Eagle Scout Award from the Boy Scouts of America.

== Footnotes ==
Legal offices
Preceded by Toney Anaya	Attorney General of New Mexico; 1979–1983	Succeeded by Paul Bardacke
Party political offices
Preceded by Joseph Montoya	Democratic nominee for U.S. Senator from New Mexico (Class 1); 1982, 1988, 1994, 2000, 2006	Succeeded by Martin Heinrich
U.S. Senate
Preceded by Harrison Schmitt	U.S. Senator (Class 1) New Mexico; 1983–2013; Served alongside: Pete Domenici, Tom Udall	Succeeded by Martin Heinrich
Preceded by Dale Bumpers	Ranking Member of the Senate Energy Committee; 1999–2001	Succeeded by Frank Murkowski
Preceded by Frank Murkowski	Chair of the Senate Energy Committee; 2001	Succeeded by Frank Murkowski
Preceded by Frank Murkowski	Ranking Member of the Senate Energy Committee; 2001	Succeeded by Frank Murkowski
Preceded by Frank Murkowski	Chair of the Senate Energy Committee; 2001–2003	Succeeded by Pete Domenici
Preceded by Frank Murkowski	Ranking Member of the Senate Energy Committee; 2003–2007	Succeeded by Pete Domenici
Preceded by Pete Domenici	Chair of the Senate Energy Committee; 2007–2013	Succeeded by Ron Wyden
U.S. order of precedence (ceremonial)
Preceded by Tom Harkin as Former U.S. Senator	Order of precedence of the United States as Former U.S. Senator	Succeeded by Kent Conrad as Former U.S. Senator
