= 1994 United States Senate election in New Mexico =

1994 election in New Mexico, United States

- November 8, 1994
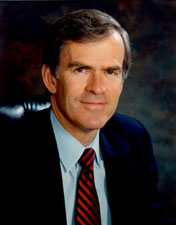

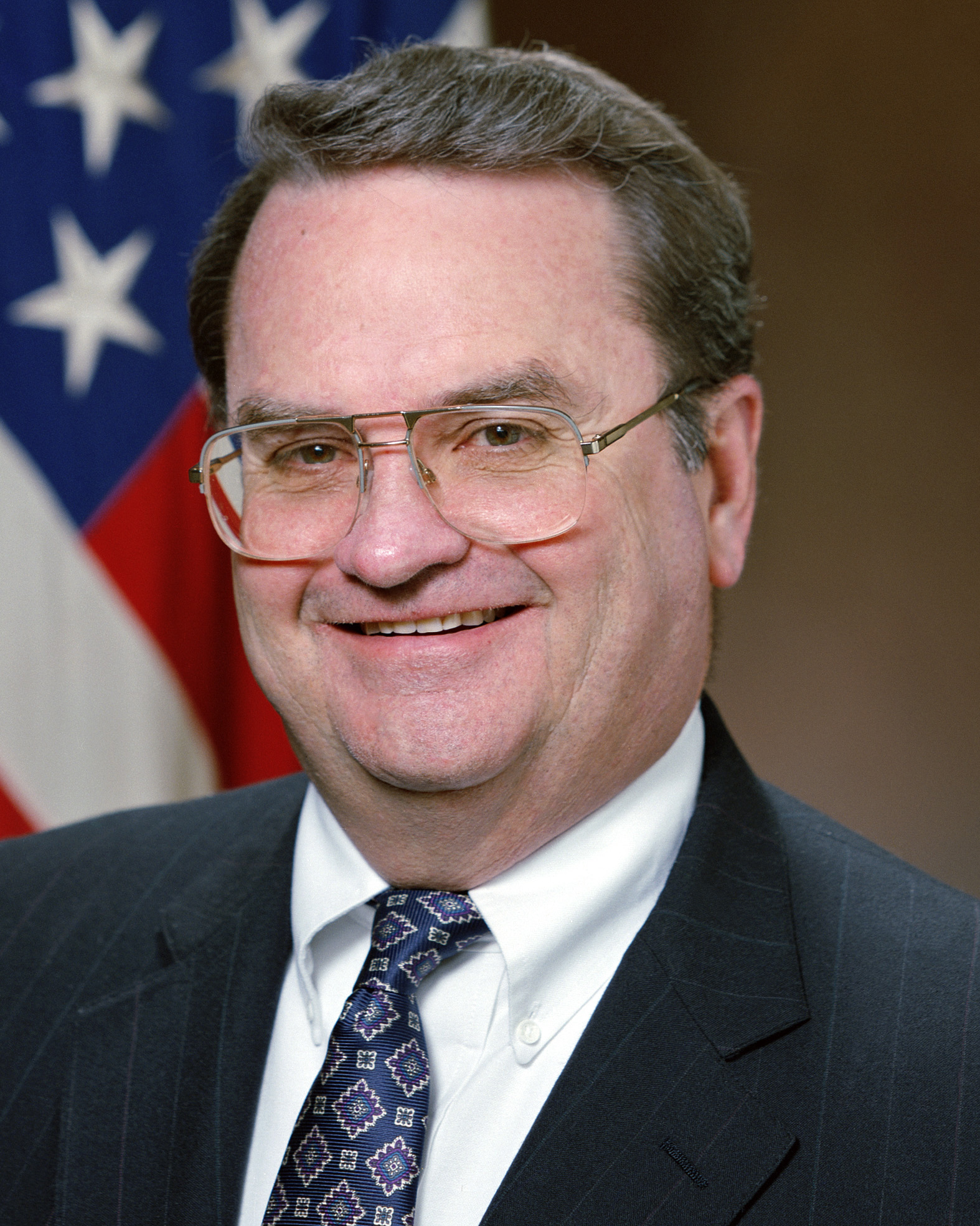
Nominee	Jeff Bingaman	Colin McMillan
Party	Democratic	Republican
Popular vote	249,989	213,025
Percentage	53.97%	45.99%
- County results Bingaman: 50–60% 60–70% 70–80% McMillan: 50–60% 60–70% 70–80%
U.S. senator before election
Jeff Bingaman
Democratic
Elected U.S. Senator
Jeff Bingaman
Democratic

The 1994 United States Senate election in New Mexico was held November 8, 1994. Incumbent Democrat Jeff Bingaman won re-election to a third term.

== Democratic primary ==
=== Candidates ===
- Jeff Bingaman, incumbent U.S. Senator

=== Results ===
Democratic primary results
Party	Candidate	Votes	%
Democratic	Jeff Bingaman (Incumbent)	165,148	100.00
Total votes		165,148	100.00

== Republican primary ==
=== Candidates ===
- Colin R. McMillan, businessman and former State Representative
- Bill Turner, water broker
- Robin Dozier Otten

=== Results ===
Republican primary results
Party	Candidate	Votes	%
Republican	Colin R. McMillan	65,119	72.57
Republican	Bill Turner	13,178	14.69
Republican	Robin Dozier Otten	11,439	12.75
Total votes		89,736	100.00

== General election ==
=== Candidates ===
- Jeff Bingaman (D), incumbent U.S. Senator
- Colin R. McMillan (R), businessman and former State Representative

=== Results ===
General election results
Party	Candidate	Votes	%	±%
Democratic	Jeff Bingaman (Incumbent)	249,989	53.97%	−9.34%
Republican	Colin R. McMillan	213,025	45.99%	+9.31%
Write-ins		182	0.04%	
Majority		36,964	7.98%	−18.64%
Turnout		463,196		
Democratic hold		Swing		

== See also ==
- 1994 United States Senate elections
