= Colin R. McMillan =

American politician (1935–2003)

Colin McMillan
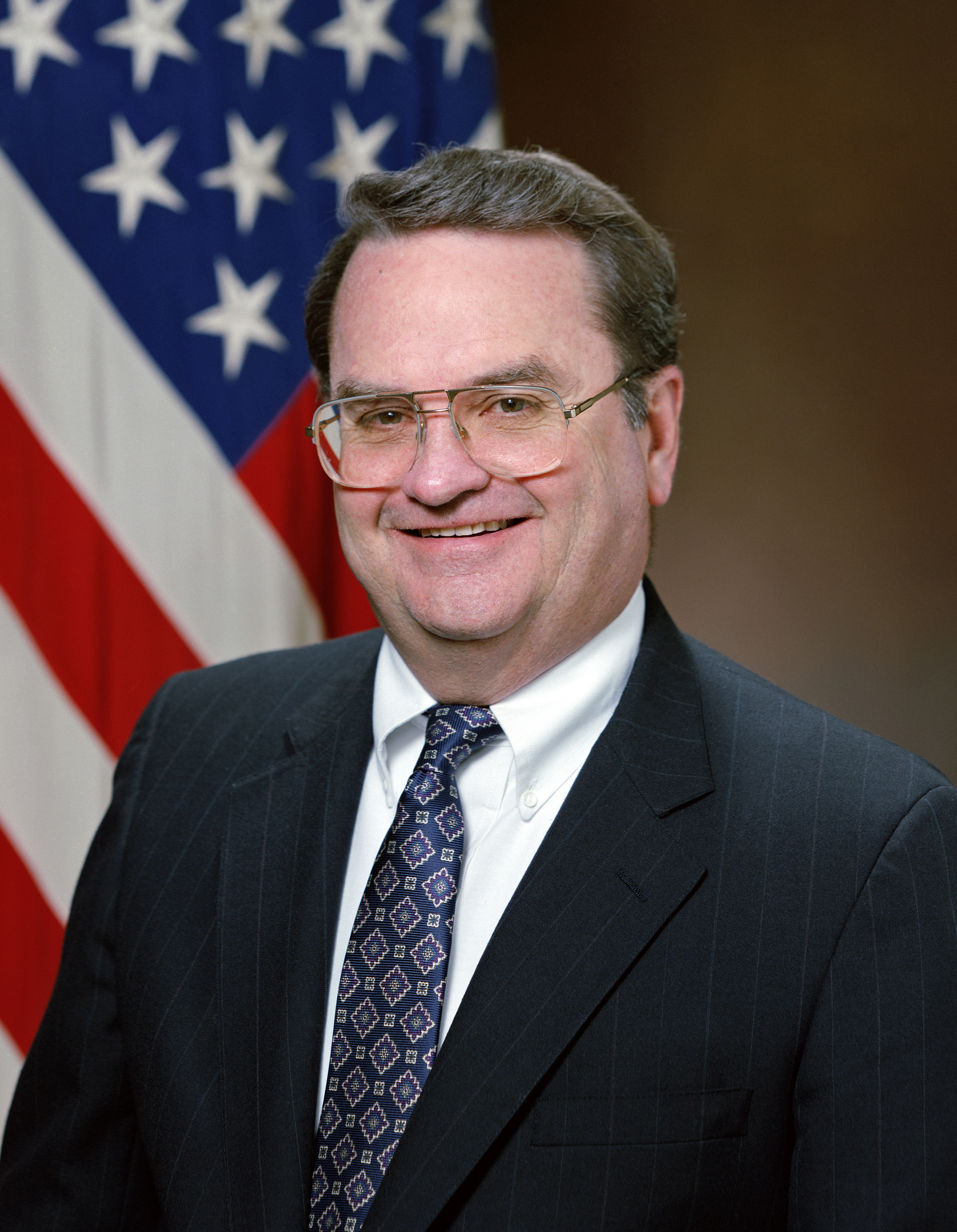

Assistant Secretary of Defense for Productions and Logistics
- In office March 5, 1990 – December 11, 1992
- President: George H. W. Bush
- Preceded by: Jack Katzen
- Succeeded by: Roger Kallock (Deputy Under Secretary of Defense for Logistics and Materiel Readiness, 2000)

Member of the New Mexico House of Representatives
- In office 1971–1982

Personal details
- Born: Colin Riley McMillan; July 27, 1935 Houston, Texas, U.S.
- Died: July 24, 2003 (aged 67) Three Rivers, New Mexico, U.S.
- Party: Republican
- Education: University of North Carolina, Chapel Hill (BS)

Military service
- Branch/service: United States Marine Corps
- Years of service: 1957–1960 (active); 1960–1972 (reserve)
- Rank: Major

Colin Riley McMillan (July 27, 1935 – July 24, 2003) was a United States Assistant Secretary of Defense under President George H. W. Bush during the Gulf War. He was awaiting confirmation as United States Secretary of the Navy in 2003 when he died from an apparently self-inflicted gunshot wound at his New Mexico ranch.

McMillan was the chairman and CEO of Permian Exploration Corporation, an oil exploration company, the chairman of the First Federal Savings Bank in Roswell, New Mexico, and the founder and CEO of McMillan Production Company. He was appointed in 2001 to be the chairman of the Sallie Mae Corporation by President George W. Bush.

McMillan earned his bachelor's degree in geology from the University of North Carolina in 1957. He served in the United States Marine Corps from 1957 to 1960 and in the Marine Corps Reserve from 1960 to 1972, attaining the rank of major.

McMillan served in the New Mexico House of Representatives from 1971 to 1982. In 1982, he was the GOP nominee for Lieutenant Governor, and in 1986 was an unsuccessful candidate for Governor in the Republican primary. McMillan was the Republican nominee for the United States Senate seat in New Mexico in 1994, but lost to incumbent Democrat Jeff Bingaman by a 54% to 46% margin. In 2000, McMillan was the New Mexico state chairman of George W. Bush's presidential campaign.

McMillan was survived by his wife, Kay, four children, and eight grandchildren.

Political offices
Preceded by Jack Katzen	Assistant Secretary of Defense for Productions and Logistics; 1990–1992	Vacant Title next held by Roger Kallock; 2000 as Deputy Under Secretary of Defense for Logistics and Materiel Readiness
Party political offices
Preceded by Bill Valentine	Republican nominee for U.S. Senator from New Mexico (Class 1); 1994	Succeeded by Bill Redmond
