= Bill Redmond =

American politician (born 1954)

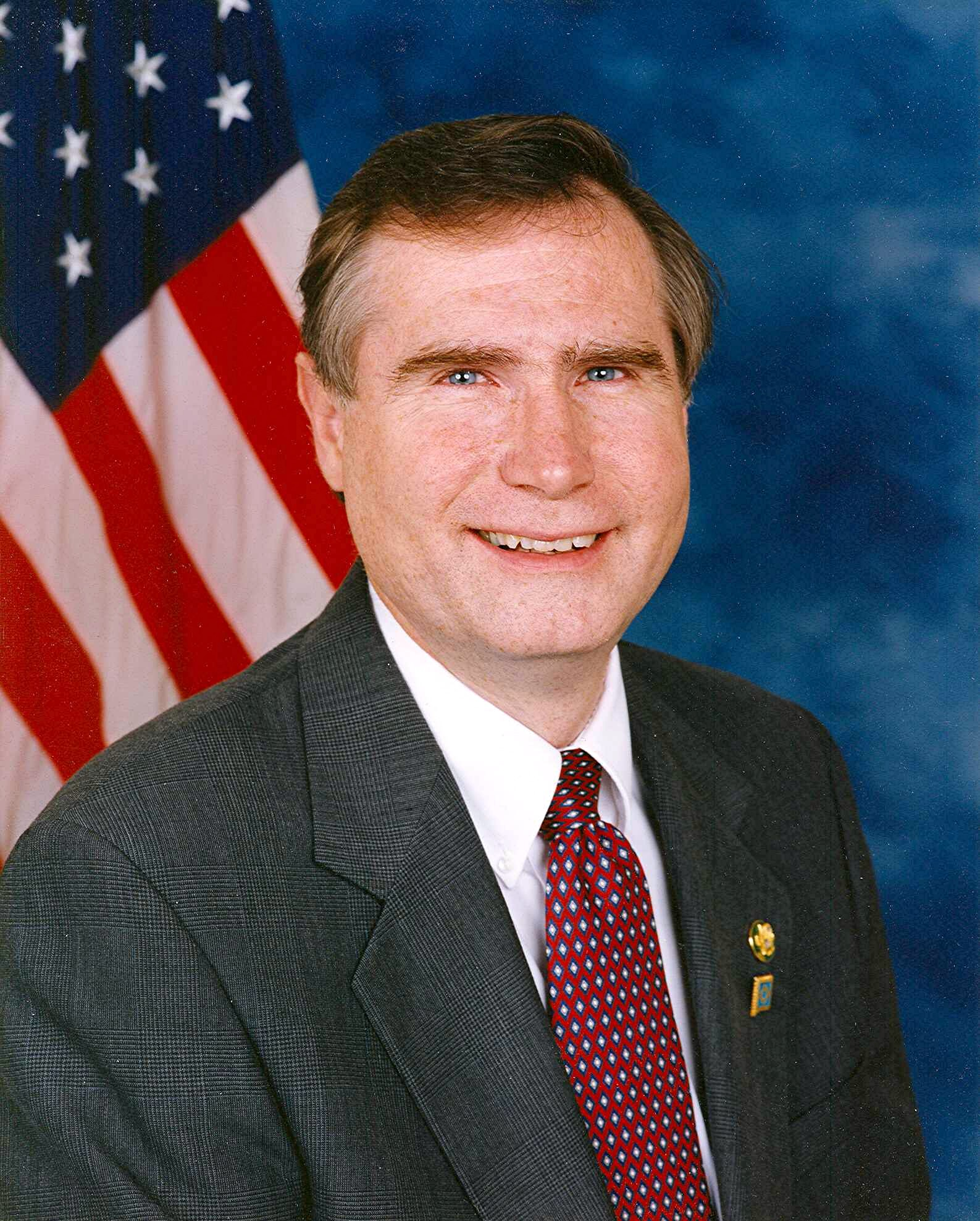

Member of the U.S. House of Representatives from New Mexico's 3rd district
- In office May 13, 1997 – January 3, 1999 (Note: Redmond's official service begins on the date of the special election, while he was not sworn in until May 20, 1997.)
- Preceded by: Bill Richardson
- Succeeded by: Tom Udall

Personal details
- Born: William Thomas Redmond; January 28, 1954 (age 72) Chicago, Illinois, U.S.
- Party: Republican
- Education: Lincoln Christian Seminary (BA, MDiv); Murray State University (MEd)

William Thomas Redmond (born January 28, 1954) is an American politician and minister who served as a Republican member of the United States House of Representatives from New Mexico. He is the only Republican to have ever represented New Mexico's 3rd congressional district.

== Early life and education ==
Redmond was born in Chicago. He graduated from Lincoln Christian College in 1979 and was ordained as an independent Christian Church minister. Prior to attending Lincoln Christian College and Seminary, Redmond attended Murray State University, where he majored in political science and accounting. In 1988, Redmond graduated with a Masters of Divinity (MDiv.) in theology and philosophy from Lincoln Christian Seminary then moved to New Mexico.

== Career ==
He served in the United States Army Reserve from 1985 until 1993 as part of an Army chaplain candidate program. Redmond was a minister for the Santa Fe Christian Church and worked as a teacher at University of New Mexico–Los Alamos.

=== United States Representative and Senate campaign ===
He ran for Congress in 1996 and was defeated by the district's longtime Democratic incumbent, Bill Richardson. Three months later, Richardson resigned to become United States Ambassador to the United Nations. Redmond was a candidate in the special election for the balance of Richardson's term. He was initially considered an underdog, but won by 3,017 votes. Green Party candidate Carol Miller took 17% of the vote, running as a more progressive alternative to Democrat Eric Serna. Miller's surprisingly strong campaign may have benefited Redmond by attracting potential Serna voters. Miller received 17,101 votes, vastly exceeding the 3,017 vote margin Redmond held over Serna.

Despite representing a Democratic district, Redmond had a solidly-conservative voting record. He ran for a full term in 1998 but lost to state Attorney General Tom Udall, 53% to 43%. Proving just how heavily-Democratic this district was, no Republican has made a serious bid for the 3rd since Redmond left Congress.

In October 1998, Democrats for Redmond described him as "truly an activist congressman" and "a man of integrity and a man who keeps his word". Reasons expressed for Democratic support for Redmond included "accomplishing more on the Land Grant issue in 16 months than any other elected official in 150 years" and introducing an amendment to the Radiation Exposure Compensation Act in order to bring justice to the affected uranium miners of New Mexico. He was also endorsed by the All Indian Pueblo Council for fighting for the rights of Native Americans.

He won the Republican nomination for the U.S. Senate in 2000 and lost to Democratic incumbent Jeff Bingaman by 138,227 votes.

U.S. House of Representatives
Preceded by Bill Richardson	Member of the U.S. House of Representatives from New Mexico's 3rd congressional district 1997–1999	Succeeded by Tom Udall
Party political offices
Preceded by Colin R. McMillan	Republican nominee for U.S. Senator from New Mexico (Class 1); 2000	Succeeded by Allen McCulloch
U.S. order of precedence (ceremonial)
Preceded by John E. Cunningham as Former U.S. Representative	Order of precedence of the United States as Former U.S. Representative	Succeeded by Charles Djou as Former U.S. Representative
