= 2000 United States Senate election in New Mexico =

- November 7, 2000
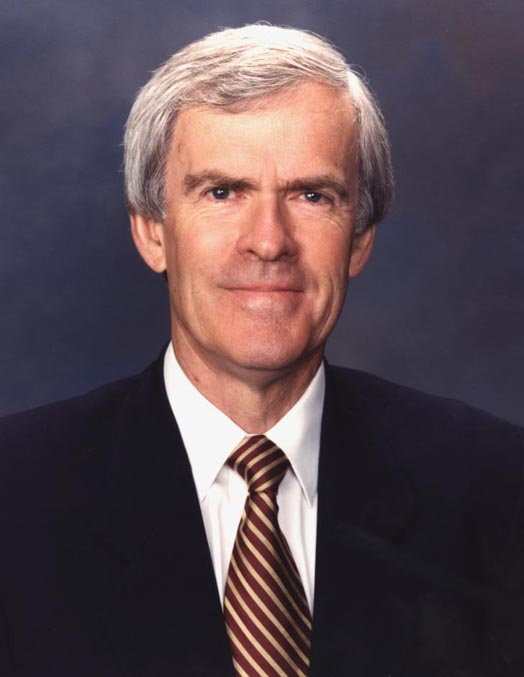

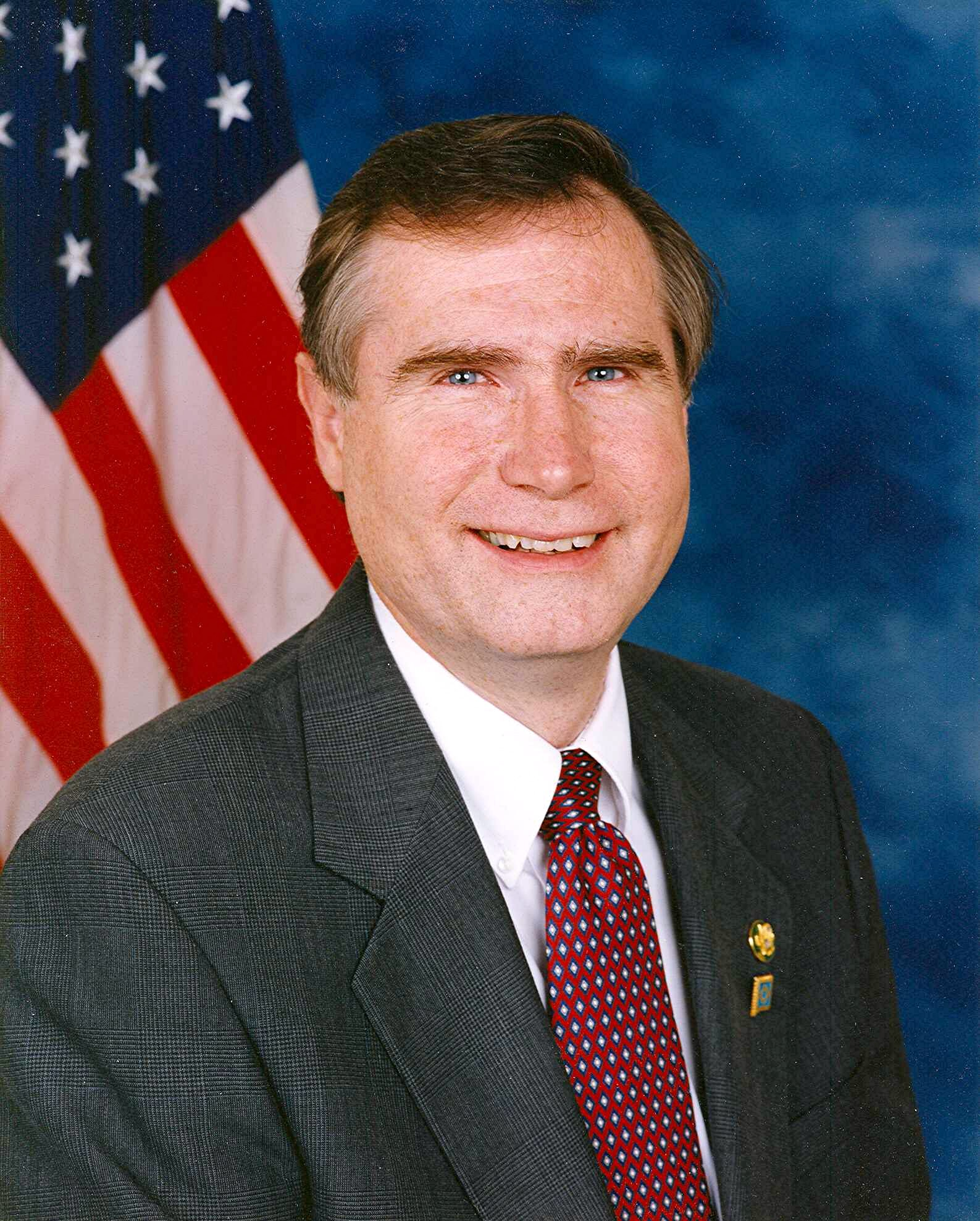
Nominee	Jeff Bingaman	Bill Redmond
Party	Democratic	Republican
Popular vote	363,744	225,517
Percentage	61.70%	38.25%
- County results Bingaman: 50–60% 60–70% 70–80% 80–90% Redmond: 50–60%
U.S. senator before election
Jeff Bingaman
Democratic
Elected U.S. Senator
Jeff Bingaman
Democratic

The 2000 United States Senate election in New Mexico took place on November 7, 2000. Democratic incumbent Jeff Bingaman was re-elected to a fourth term in a landslide against Republican former congressman Bill Redmond.

== Democratic primary ==
=== Candidates ===
- Jeff Bingaman, incumbent U.S. senator since 1983

=== Results ===
Democratic primary results
Party	Candidate	Votes	%
Democratic	Jeff Bingaman (incumbent)	124,887	100.00
Total votes		124,887	100.00

== Republican primary ==
=== Candidates ===
- Bill Redmond, former U.S. representative from Santa Fe
- Steve Pearce, state representative from Hobbs
- William Davis, former state senator

=== Results ===
Republican primary results
Party	Candidate	Votes	%
Republican	Bill Redmond	43,780	60.39
Republican	Steve Pearce	15,628	21.56
Republican	William F. Davis	13,083	18.05
Total votes		72,491	100.00

== General election ==
=== Candidates ===
- Jeff Bingaman, incumbent U.S. senator since 1983 (Democratic)
- Bill Redmond, former U.S. representative from Santa Fe (Republican)

=== Polling ===
Poll source	Date(s)	Sample size	Margin of error	Jeff Bingaman (D)	Bill Redmond (R)	Other / undecided (Note: Calculated by taking the difference of 100% and all other candidates combined.)
Harris Insights & Analytics	November 3, 2000	1,656	—	61%	35%	4%
Mason-Dixon Polling & Strategy	November 2, 2000	425	—	60%	30%	10%

=== Results ===
General election results
Party	Candidate	Votes	%	±%
Democratic	Jeff Bingaman (incumbent)	363,744	61.70%	+7.73%
Republican	Bill Redmond	225,517	38.25%	−7.74%
Write-ins		265	0.04%	
Majority		138,227	23.45%	+15.47%
Turnout		589,526		
Democratic hold		Swing		

==== Counties that flipped from Republican to Democratic ====
- Quay (largest city: Tucumcari)
- Luna (largest city: Deming)
- Hidalgo (largest city: Lordsburg)
- Sierra (largest city: Truth or Consequences)
- Doña Ana (largest city: Las Cruces)
- Otero (largest city: Alamogordo)
- Chaves (largest village: Roswell)
- Eddy (largest city: Carlsbad)
- Lea (largest city: Hobbs)

== See also ==
- 2000 United States Senate elections
