= United States Senate Democratic Chairman of Committee Outreach =

The Chairman of Committee Outreach is a Democratic United States Senator and member of the party leadership of the United States Senate responsible for representing the views of United States Senate committee chairs to the chamber's Democratic leadership. An independent who caucuses with the Democrats, Bernie Sanders has been the chair since 2016.
