= Eugene W. Peirce Jr. =

American politician

Member of the New Mexico House of Representatives
- In office 1965–1970

Personal details
- Born: March 20, 1931 Oak Park, Illinois, U.S.
- Died: April 20, 2015 (aged 84)
- Party: Republican
- Education: Junior College; University of New Mexico

Eugene W. Peirce Jr. (March 20, 1931 – April 20, 2015) was an American politician. He served as a Republican member of the New Mexico House of Representatives.

== Life and career ==
Peirce was born March 20, 1931, in Oak Park, Illinois. He attended Lyons Township High School, Junior College and the University of New Mexico.

Peirce served in the New Mexico House of Representatives from 1965 to 1970.

Peirce died on April 20, 2015, at the age of 84.
