= Green Party of New Mexico =

Political party in New Mexico

- Headquarters: P. O. Box 40033; Albuquerque, New Mexico 87196
- Membership (2026): ▲4,667
- Ideology: Green politics
- Political position: Left-wing
- National affiliation: Green Party
- Colors: Green
- U.S. Senate: 0 / 2
- U.S. House: 0 / 3
- Statewide offices: 0 / 6
- Senate: 0 / 42
- House of Representatives: 0 / 70

Website
- greenpartyofnm.org

The Green Party of New Mexico (GPNM) is the state party organization of the Green Party of the United States for New Mexico. It is currently qualified as a minor party and is noted for its solid following.

== See also ==
- History of New Mexico
